= Irving School =

Irving School may refer to:

- Irving School (Mesa, Arizona), listed on the National Register of Historic Places in Maricopa County, Arizona
- Irving School (Duluth, Minnesota), listed on the National Register of Historic Places in St. Louis County, Minnesota
- Irving High School, Irving, Texas

== See also ==
- Washington Irving High School (disambiguation)
