= National Register of Historic Places listings in St. Louis County, Minnesota =

Location of Saint Louis County in Minnesota

This is a list of the National Register of Historic Places listings in Saint Louis County, Minnesota. It is intended to be a complete list of the properties and districts on the National Register of Historic Places in Saint Louis County, Minnesota, United States. The locations of National Register properties and districts for which the latitude and longitude coordinates are included below, may be seen in an online map.

There are 136 properties and districts listed on the National Register in the county, including three National Historic Landmarks. A supplementary list includes three additional sites that were formerly on the National Register.

Many of Saint Louis County's listings are associated with the city of Duluth's role as the westernmost port on the Great Lakes, shared with Superior, Wisconsin. The iron ore of the Mesabi Range and the Vermilion Range led to the development of the cities of Chisholm, Hibbing, Virginia, and Ely. Three of the iron mines are National Historic Landmarks: Hull–Rust–Mahoning Open Pit Iron Mine, Mountain Iron Mine, and the underground Soudan Iron Mine.

This National Park Service list is complete through NPS recent listings posted November 6, 2026.

== Current listings ==
	Name on the Register	Image	Date listed	Location	City or town	Description
1	Aerial Lift Bridge	Aerial Lift Bridge	May 22, 1973 (#73002174)	Lake Ave. 46°46′44″N 92°05′34″W	Duluth	Iconic bridge serving as the western gateway to the Great Lakes, originating in 1905 as a rare transporter bridge but modified 1929–30 into a vertical-lift bridge by C.A.P. Turner.
2	Elias and Lisi Aho Historic Farmstead	Elias and Lisi Aho Historic Farmstead	April 9, 1990 (#90000499)	7410 Skarp Rd. 47°39′06″N 92°09′35″W	Embarrass vicinity	Farmstead with six contributing properties built 1902–07, reflecting the successful cultivation of northeastern Minnesota's cutover forests by Finnish American settlers and their use of traditional log architecture.
3	Alango School	Alango School	July 17, 1980 (#80004338)	9076 Highway 25; 47°46′25″N 92°47′35″W	Cook vicinity	Large and well-preserved example of northern Minnesota's rural schools, built in 1927 with faculty living quarters owing to its remoteness.
4	Andrew G. Anderson House	Andrew G. Anderson House	December 4, 1980 (#80004348)	1001 E. Howard St. 47°25′40″N 92°55′46″W	Hibbing	1920 Colonial/Spanish Revival house built for a pioneer in the intercity bus transportation industry.
5	Androy Hotel	Androy Hotel	June 13, 1986 (#86001290)	502 E. Howard St. 47°25′38″N 92°56′10″W	Hibbing	Prominent Renaissance Revival hotel built in 1921 by the Oliver Iron Mining Company. Also a contributing property to the East Howard Street Commercial Historic District.
6	Archaeological Site No. 21SL82	Archaeological Site No. 21SL82	February 17, 1988 (#88000067)	Address restricted	Voyageurs National Park	Campsite used c. 3000 BCE–1900 CE.
7	Archeological Site 21SL35	Archeological Site 21SL35	December 29, 1987 (#87002165)	Address restricted	Voyageurs National Park	Large beach site exclusively occupied by the Laurel complex of the early Woodland period, with what may be the earliest evidence of wild rice use in Minnesota. Also known as the Clyde Creek Site.
8	Archeological Site 21SL55	Archeological Site 21SL55	July 8, 1988 (#88000989)	Address restricted	Voyageurs National Park	Island site exclusively occupied by the Blackduck culture of the late Woodland period, with a possible ricing jig and other subsurface features.
9	Archeological Site 21SL141	Archeological Site 21SL141	December 31, 1987 (#87002164)	Address restricted	Voyageurs National Park	Habitation site occupied c. 300–1900 CE.
10	Archeological Site No. 21SL73	Archeological Site No. 21SL73	January 16, 1989 (#88003130)	Address restricted	Voyageurs National Park	Seasonal campsite used 100 BCE–1500 CE.
11	B'nai Abraham Synagogue	B'nai Abraham Synagogue	August 18, 1980 (#80004356)	328 S. 5th St. 47°31′07″N 92°32′11″W	Virginia	1909 synagogue, attesting both to the ethnic diversity of the Iron Range and to the commonality of its immigrant groups maintaining cohesion around religious centers.
12	W. Bailey House	W. Bailey House	August 27, 1980 (#80004347)	705 Pierce St. 47°27′47″N 92°32′04″W	Eveleth	1905 house noted as Eveleth's leading example of Queen Anne architecture.
13	W.T. Bailey House	W.T. Bailey House	December 4, 1980 (#80004357)	816 S. 5th Ave. 47°30′59″N 92°32′17″W	Virginia	Distinctive Spanish Colonial Revival house built circa 1921 for the wealthy founder of Virginia's second largest lumber company.
14	Bridge No. 5757	Bridge No. 5757	June 26, 1998 (#98000720)	MN 23 over Mission Creek; 46°39′38″N 92°16′32″W	Duluth	Well-crafted 1937 arch bridge with a modular metal substructure, masonry veneer, and Gothic Revival detailing. Removed in 2019.
15	Bridge No. L-6007	Bridge No. L-6007	November 6, 1989 (#89001826)	Skyline Parkway over Stewart Creek; 46°42′13″N 92°13′41″W	Duluth	Circa-1925 stone arch bridge singled out for its highly picturesque design and setting in a city park.
16	Bridge No. L6113	Bridge No. L6113	December 20, 2016 (#16000872)	East 4th St. over Tischer Creek in Congdon Park; 46°49′10″N 92°03′48″W	Duluth	Striking example of Neoclassical and rustic architecture applied to a bridge, built in 1925 with a reinforced concrete substructure and a veneer of local gabbro masonry to complement its park setting.
17	Bridge No. L8515	Bridge No. L8515	December 20, 2016 (#16000873)	Lewis St. over Tischer Creek; 46°49′46″N 92°04′21″W	Duluth	Striking example of rustic architecture applied to a bridge, built in 1922 with a reinforced concrete substructure and a veneer of local gabbro masonry to complement its park-like setting.
18	Bruce Mine Headframe	Bruce Mine Headframe	November 28, 1978 (#78003124)	Off U.S. Highway 169; 47°28′38″N 92°51′54″W	Chisholm	The last surviving example of the Mesabi Range's once numerous headframes, built 1925–26 when underground mining rather than open-pit mining was still the norm.
19	Buhl Public Library	Buhl Public Library	February 10, 1983 (#83004605)	400 Jones Ave. 47°29′45″N 92°46′34″W	Buhl	1917 public library financed by local mining revenue to serve the educational and cultural needs of a multi-ethnic company town.
20	Buhl Village Hall	Buhl Village Hall	February 10, 1983 (#83000944)	300 Jones Ave. 47°29′44″N 92°46′40″W	Buhl	Well preserved early-20th-century Beaux-Arts municipal hall—built in 1913—and Buhl's long-serving seat of government.
21	Bull-of-the-Woods Logging Scow	Bull-of-the-Woods Logging Scow	February 12, 1999 (#99000189)	Hoist Bay, Burntside Lake; 47°53′45″N 92°01′33″W	Morse Township	Wreck of a circa-1893 timber rafting scow, the only known example of a distinctive and little-documented vessel type instrumental to the northern Minnesota logging industry.
22	Burntside Lodge Historic District	Burntside Lodge Historic District	June 23, 1988 (#88000896)	2755 Burntside Lodge Rd. 47°55′28″N 91°57′08″W	Ely	Northern St. Louis County's first full-scale commercial resort and finest collection of log resort buildings, with 19 contributing properties built from 1914 to the mid-1930s.
23	Emmett Butler House	Emmett Butler House	December 4, 1980 (#80004349)	2530 3rd Ave. W. 47°25′14″N 92°56′39″W	Hibbing	1916 house noted for its Colonial Revival architecture and association with Emmett Butler, a local leader and an executive in Minnesota's influential Butler Brothers Construction Company.
24	Chester Terrace	Chester Terrace	November 19, 1980 (#80004341)	1210–1232 E. 1st St. 46°47′58″N 92°05′00″W	Duluth	Outstanding local example of a Romanesque Revival rowhouse, designed by Oliver G. Traphagen and Francis W. Fitzpatrick and constructed in 1890.
25	Chisholm Commercial Historic District	Chisholm Commercial Historic District	August 4, 2016 (#16000512)	W. Lake St. between Central Ave. & 4th Ave., east side of Central Ave between 1st St. NE. & 1st St. SE. 47°29′21″N 92°52′55″W	Chisholm	Four-block commercial district associated with the development of Chisholm as an economic and social hub on the Mesabi Range, with 55 contributing properties built 1908–1925.
26	Church of St. John the Baptist (Catholic)	Church of St. John the Baptist (Catholic)	August 27, 1980 (#80004362)	309 S. 3rd Ave. 47°31′15″N 92°32′09″W	Virginia	1924 church that anchored Virginia's Polish American community. Demolished in 2018.
27	Church of St. Joseph (Catholic)	Church of St. Joseph (Catholic)	September 6, 2002 (#02000940)	7897 Elmer Rd. 47°05′01″N 92°46′37″W	Elmer	1913 church and adjacent cemetery associated with corporate efforts to settle northern Minnesota once it had been cleared of valuable timber.
28	Church of the Holy Family (Catholic)	Church of the Holy Family (Catholic)	August 27, 1980 (#80004345)	307 Adams Ave. 47°27′45″N 92°32′18″W	Eveleth	1909 church that anchored a Slovene American congregation, one of Eveleth's major ethnic groups.
29	Civilian Conservation Corps Camp S-52	Civilian Conservation Corps Camp S-52	March 2, 1989 (#89000158)	Off U.S. Highway 53; 48°06′05″N 92°50′39″W	Cusson	Four workshops constructed around 1933 for a Civilian Conservation Corps forestry camp, the only surviving buildings in the area built for the agency.
30	Coates House	Coates House	August 18, 1980 (#80004358)	817 S. 5th Ave. 47°30′58″N 92°32′20″W	Virginia	Lavish house built circa 1912, telegraphing the social status of the succession of lumber industry elites who resided in it.
31	Chester and Clara Congdon Estate	Chester and Clara Congdon Estate	August 15, 1991 (#91001057)	3300 London Rd. 46°48′55″N 92°03′06″W	Duluth	Duluth's finest mansion and grounds, better known as Glensheen Historic Estate; built 1905–1920 in Jacobethan style by Clarence H. Johnston Sr. with landscape architecture by Charles Wellford Leavitt. Now a museum.
32	Delvic Building	Delvic Building	July 17, 1980 (#80004350)	102 E. Howard St. 47°25′38″N 92°56′30″W	Hibbing	1922 commercial building originating from the Oliver Iron Mining Company's unusual step of designing the business as well as the residential districts of a company town. Also a contributing property to the East Howard Street Commercial Historic District.
33	DeWitt-Seitz Building	DeWitt-Seitz Building	September 5, 1985 (#85001999)	394 Lake Ave. S. 46°46′55″N 92°05′40″W	Duluth	Rare surviving example of the manufacturing and jobbing factories that once populated Duluth's early-20th-century waterfront, built in 1909 in exemplary Chicago School style.
34	Duluth and Iron Range Railroad Company Passenger Station	Duluth and Iron Range Railroad Company Passenger Station	June 14, 2013 (#13000380)	404 Pine St. 47°48′16″N 92°16′45″W	Tower	1915 railway station that spurred the resort and tourism industry on Lake Vermilion in the decades before highway access. Nomination includes a section of rail and several train cars. Now a museum.
35	Duluth Armory	Duluth Armory	June 1, 2011 (#11000324)	1301–1305 London Rd. 46°47′56″N 92°04′50″W	Duluth	1915 National Guard and naval militia armory, home base of a critical port's peacekeeping and disaster response forces, as well as Duluth's largest cultural event venue until 1966.
36	Duluth Central High School	Duluth Central High School	November 9, 1972 (#72001488)	215 N. 1st Ave. E. 46°47′21″N 92°06′01″W	Duluth	1892 school building with a prominent clock tower, a major Duluth landmark and one of Minnesota's finest examples of Richardsonian Romanesque architecture.
37	Duluth Civic Center Historic District	Duluth Civic Center Historic District	November 6, 1986 (#86003097)	5th Ave. W. and 1st St. 46°47′00″N 92°06′23″W	Duluth	Government complex associated with architect and urban designer Daniel Burnham and the City Beautiful movement, with five contributing properties built 1909–1929.
38	Duluth Commercial Historic District	Duluth Commercial Historic District	May 31, 2006 (#06000455)	Superior and 1st Sts. between 4th Ave. W. and 4th Ave. E. 46°47′14″N 92°05′56″W	Duluth	Business district nine blocks long and two wide, representing Duluth's commercial development and popular architectural styles at the turn of the 20th century, with 87 contributing properties built 1872–1929.
39	Duluth Harbor North Pier Light	Duluth Harbor North Pier Light	June 7, 2016 (#16000340)	East end of Duluth Ship Canal North Pier; 46°46′51″N 92°05′18″W	Duluth	1910 lighthouse, associated with federal efforts to establish nationwide navigational aids, and characteristic of the early-20th-century pier and breakwater lights built around the Great Lakes.
40	Duluth Harbor South Breakwater Outer Light	Duluth Harbor South Breakwater Outer Light	June 7, 2016 (#16000341)	East end of Duluth Ship Canal South Breakwater; 46°46′48″N 92°05′16″W	Duluth	1901 lighthouse, associated with federal efforts to establish nationwide navigational aids, and characteristic of early-20th-century harbor breakwater lights built around the Great Lakes.
41	Duluth Masonic Temple	Duluth Masonic Temple	May 11, 2015 (#15000215)	4 W. 2nd St. 46°47′17″N 92°06′01″W	Duluth	1905 Masonic Temple, the longstanding focal point of Duluth's most influential fraternal organization. Further noted for containing Minnesota's largest operable collection of hand-painted stage backdrops.
42	Duluth Missabe and Iron Range Depot (Endion)	Duluth Missabe and Iron Range Depot (Endion)	April 16, 1975 (#75002088)	100 Lake Pl. 46°47′11″N 92°05′42″W	Duluth	1899 Richardsonian Romanesque train station, one of Duluth's few surviving small passenger depots and a seminal work of local architect I. Vernon Hill. Moved to Canal Park in 1986.
43	Duluth Public Library	Duluth Public Library	May 5, 1978 (#78003125)	101 W. 2nd St. 46°47′14″N 92°06′08″W	Duluth	Duluth's first purpose-built library, constructed in 1902 with Carnegie funds; noted for its Neoclassical architecture and association with early community education efforts.
44	Duluth South Breakwater Inner (Duluth Range Rear) Lighthouse	Duluth South Breakwater Inner (Duluth Range Rear) Lighthouse	August 4, 1983 (#83000945)	South Breakwater; 46°46′43″N 92°05′31″W	Duluth	Lighthouse built 1900–1901, one of the federal navigation aids essential to the development of the Great Lakes as the nation's most important transportation system in the 19th and early 20th centuries.
45	Duluth State Normal School Historic District	Duluth State Normal School Historic District	November 8, 1985 (#85002757)	E. 5th St. 46°48′45″N 92°04′35″W	Duluth	Nominated as Minnesota's most intact state normal school campus, with four contributing properties built 1898–1926. Now part of the University of Minnesota Duluth. The Beaux-Arts Old Main was reduced to freestanding remnants after a 1993 fire.
46	Duluth Union Depot	Duluth Union Depot	December 9, 1971 (#71001028)	506 W. Michigan St. 46°46′53″N 92°06′15″W	Duluth	1892 Châteauesque train station designed by Peabody and Stearns, a unique example of the era's large railroad terminals and the connection they provided to the rest of the nation. Now houses a variety of cultural institutions.
47	Duluth, Winnipeg, and Pacific Depot	Duluth, Winnipeg, and Pacific Depot	August 18, 1980 (#80004364)	600 Chestnut St. 47°31′23″N 92°32′28″W	Virginia	Distinctive 1913 train station, symbolizing Virginia's importance as a major entry point to the Mesabi Range and its dependence on rail transport to deliver goods and workers and ship out ore.
48	East Howard Street Commercial Historic District	East Howard Street Commercial Historic District	April 1, 1993 (#93000255)	101–510 E. Howard St. 47°25′39″N 92°56′21″W	Hibbing	Four-block business district with 34 contributing properties built 1919–1925, planned and executed by the Oliver Iron Mining Company upon relocating Hibbing to expand its operations.
49	Ely Community Center	Ely Community Center	May 23, 2016 (#16000280)	30 S. 1st Ave. E. 47°54′06″N 91°51′55″W	Ely	1938 multi-purpose public building, a long-serving municipal and social venue exemplifying local partnerships with the Public Works Administration and PWA Moderne architecture.
50	Ely State Theater	Ely State Theater	July 21, 2015 (#15000440)	234 E. Sheridan St. 47°54′11″N 91°51′46″W	Ely	1936 Streamline Moderne theater, epitomizing the small-town commissions of leading regional theater designers Liebenberg & Kaplan.
51	Endion School	Endion School	February 10, 1983 (#83000946)	1801 E. 1st St. 46°48′19″N 92°04′37″W	Duluth	Duluth's most architecturally significant surviving Late Victorian school, built in Richardsonian Romanesque style in 1890.
52	Engine House No. 1	Engine House No. 1	May 12, 1975 (#75002089)	101 E. 3rd St. 46°47′25″N 92°06′01″W	Duluth	1889 example of Duluth's late-19th-century fire stations and a symbol of the transition from a volunteer fire department to a professional municipal agency. Boundary expanded to include the adjacent 1889 stable/shop building.
53	Eveleth Recreation Building	Eveleth Recreation Building	November 25, 1980 (#80004344)	Garfield St. and Adams Ave. 47°27′59″N 92°32′20″W	Eveleth	Building constructed in 1918 as a municipal gymnasium serving male mine workers, but converted in 1947 into a shirt factory as the female population increased and women sought employment.
54	Finnish Apostolic Lutheran Church of Embarrass	Finnish Apostolic Lutheran Church of Embarrass	October 23, 2023 (#100009477)	5103 Highway 21; 47°39′32″N 92°13′26″W	Embarrass	One of the Iron Range's few surviving early Apostolic Lutheran churches, built in 1907 and enlarged 1930–1950. Also associated with the founding, commerce, and cultural retention of Embarrass's Finnish American settlers.
55	Finnish Sauna	Finnish Sauna	August 26, 1980 (#80004360)	105 S. 1st St. 47°31′21″N 92°31′54″W	Virginia	Commercial Finnish sauna built circa 1912, representing the impact of and services developed for Finnish Americans populating the Iron Range cities.
56	First National Bank of Gilbert	First National Bank of Gilbert	July 17, 2012 (#12000415)	2 N. Broadway; 47°29′15″N 92°28′00″W	Gilbert	1920 bank noted for its prominent Neoclassical architecture and commercial impact, particularly on the local agricultural sector.
57	Fitger Brewing Company	Fitger Brewing Company	February 9, 1984 (#84001690)	600 E. Superior St. 46°47′33″N 92°05′26″W	Duluth	Complex of Duluth's oldest continually operated brewery, active 1859–1974, with ten contributing properties built 1886–1920 representing Duluth's late-19th/early-20th-century industrial architecture.
58	Flint Creek Farm Historic District	Flint Creek Farm Historic District	March 2, 1989 (#89000139)	State Highway 1; 47°51′45″N 92°48′36″W	Cook vicinity	One of only two known surviving Minnesota farmsteads established to supply a major lumber company with provisions for its workers and livestock, with four contributing properties built circa 1910–1915.
59	Jun Fujita Cabin	Jun Fujita Cabin	December 2, 1996 (#96001351)	Wendt Island, Rainy Lake; 48°32′59″N 92°52′11″W	Voyageurs National Park	1928 lake cabin of Japanese American photographer and poet Jun Fujita (1888–1963). Also a rare surviving example of the early recreational development of the Boundary Waters.
60	Gregorius and Mary Hanka Historic Farmstead	Gregorius and Mary Hanka Historic Farmstead	April 9, 1990 (#90000500)	7938 Pylka Rd. 47°41′24″N 92°12′10″W	Embarrass Township	Farmstead with six contributing properties built circa 1910–1915, reflecting the agricultural efforts and traditional log architecture of the area's Finnish American settlers.
61	Hartley Building	Hartley Building	December 15, 1989 (#89002127)	740 E. Superior St. 46°47′39″N 92°05′18″W	Duluth	1914 Tudor Revival office building designed by Bertram Goodhue, the only nationally recognized architect to complete multiple commissions in early Duluth.
62	Height of Land Portage	Height of Land Portage	July 23, 1992 (#92000842)	Off County Rd. 138 in Embarrass, White, and Pike Townships; 47°36′49″N 92°18′06″W	Embarrass vicinity	4.6-mile (7.4 km) portage route over the Laurentian Divide with potential archaeological resources, associated with the fur trade and European expansion from the 1630s to the 1870s.
63	Hibbing City Hall	Hibbing City Hall	February 12, 1981 (#81000683)	401 E. 21st St. 47°25′36″N 92°56′14″W	Hibbing	1922 Colonial Revival city hall, one of northern Minnesota's most architecturally distinctive public buildings and the longstanding seat of government for a major Iron Range community.
64	Hibbing Disposal Plant	Hibbing Disposal Plant	August 9, 1991 (#91001022)	1300 E. 23rd St. 47°25′30″N 92°54′56″W	Hibbing	Sewage treatment plant built 1938–39, one of northern Minnesota's largest PWA projects and an example of the modern sanitation facilities funded by the New Deal.
65	Hibbing High School	Hibbing High School	August 11, 1980 (#80004351)	800 E. 21st St. 47°25′32″N 92°55′57″W	Hibbing	School built 1919–1924, noted for its lavish Jacobethan architecture and association with the mutual desire by corporations and residents for improved public education as the mining industry mechanized.
66	Matt and Emma Hill Historic Farmstead		April 9, 1990 (#90000768)	6206 Honkola Rd. 47°39′21″N 92°19′56″W	Embarrass vicinity	Farmstead with eight contributing properties built circa-1897–1903, reflecting the pivot of St. Louis County's Finnish immigrants from industrial labor to agriculture, and their use of traditional log architecture.
67	Hotel Glode	Hotel Glode	November 25, 1980 (#80004346)	222 Adams Ave. 47°27′44″N 92°32′16″W	Eveleth	Leading 1904 hotel which served as a major depot on the Mesaba Railway, active 1912–1927 as the first interurban mass transit system developed on the Iron Range.
68	Hull–Rust–Mahoning Open Pit Iron Mine	Hull–Rust–Mahoning Open Pit Iron Mine	November 13, 1966 (#66000904)	3rd Ave. E. 47°27′10″N 92°57′40″W	Hibbing	World's largest iron mine and one of its first open-pits, whose prodigious output since its 1895 establishment made Minnesota the nation's largest iron ore producer and the U.S. the largest steel manufacturer.
69	William Ingersoll Estate	William Ingersoll Estate	June 15, 2011 (#11000360)	Ingersoll's Island, Crane Lake; 48°21′16″N 92°28′23″W	Voyageurs National Park	1920s island summer home complex, whose 1928 main cabin was a rare surviving E. F. Hodgson Company prefabricated kit house. Collapsed in 2014 and subsequently removed.
70	Irving School	Irving School	November 20, 1992 (#92001611)	101 N. 56th Ave. W. 46°44′07″N 92°10′07″W	Duluth	Well-preserved 1895 school noted for its early Renaissance Revival design by Palmer, Hall, & Hunt and its association with the expansion and evolution of the Duluth school system.
71	Jukola Boardinghouse	Jukola Boardinghouse	March 10, 1982 (#82004710)	201 N. 3rd Ave. 47°31′29″N 92°32′05″W	Virginia	1912 boarding house, a well-preserved example of the many such facilities built to accommodate the influx of unmarried men to work the Iron Range mines.
72	Kabetogama Ranger Station District	Kabetogama Ranger Station District	June 18, 1993 (#93000479)	Southwestern shore of Kabetogama Lake in Voyageurs National Park; 48°26′43″N 93°01′44″W	Kabetogama	Complex built 1933–1941 for the Minnesota Division of Forestry by the Civilian Conservation Corps, an example of federal work relief projects during the Great Depression and National Park Service rustic architecture.
73	Kettle Falls Historic District	Kettle Falls Historic District	July 17, 1978 (#78000376)	Kettle Channel; 48°30′05″N 92°38′25″W	Voyageurs National Park	Dam, two log buildings, and hotel built circa-1910–1914 at a key portage on the Canada–United States border, an isolated nexus of industry and tourism in the Boundary Waters wilderness.
74	Kettle Falls Hotel	Kettle Falls Hotel	January 11, 1976 (#76000210)	Kettle Channel; 48°30′11″N 92°38′24″W	Voyageurs National Park	1913 hotel built to provide lodging and meals to commercial fishermen, lumberjacks, buyers, and tourists at a key portage deep in a roadless area.
75	Kitchi Gammi Club	Kitchi Gammi Club	April 16, 1975 (#75002090)	831 E. Superior St. 46°47′43″N 92°05′16″W	Duluth	1912 clubhouse noted for its fine Georgian/Gothic Revival design by Bertram Goodhue and its superlative craftsmanship.
76	LaSalle Apartments	LaSalle Apartments	November 27, 2017 (#100001845)	201 N 5th Ave. 47°31′27″N 92°32′18″W	Virginia	1924 apartment building exemplifying the emergence of multi-unit housing for middle-class urbanites in the early 20th century.
77	LeMoine Building	LeMoine Building	March 2, 1989 (#89000140)	Taft St. 47°58′06″N 92°48′37″W	Gheen	One of northern Minnesota's few surviving examples of the once-common false-fronted commercial building—constructed in 1913—and the most intact historic building in the lumber-era townsite of Gheen.
78	Charles Lenont House	Charles Lenont House	August 18, 1980 (#80004359)	202 N. 5th Ave. 47°31′27″N 92°32′21″W	Virginia	Large 1900 house, Virginia's best-preserved example of Queen Anne architecture and a manifestation of the class distinctions telegraphed by housing type on the early Iron Range.
79	Lester River Bridge-Bridge No. 5772	Lester River Bridge-Bridge No. 5772	September 6, 2002 (#02000934)	London Rd. over the Lester River; 46°50′12″N 92°00′22″W	Duluth	Concrete arch bridge built 1924–25, significant for its Neoclassical architecture, impressive 103.5-foot (31.5 m) span, and association with the opening of the highway along the scenic North Shore.
80	Adolph Levin Cottage	Adolph Levin Cottage	June 15, 2011 (#11000361)	Kabetogama Narrows near Ash River Maintenance Dock; 48°26′05″N 92°51′22″W	Voyageurs National Park	Representative early-20th-century lake retreat with a 1937 log cabin noted for its rustic architecture and traditional Finnish construction.
81	Lincoln Branch Library	Lincoln Branch Library	January 14, 2013 (#12001175)	2229 W. 2nd St. 46°46′00″N 92°07′44″W	Duluth	1917 Carnegie library reflecting the evolving emphasis of the Carnegie Foundation and Duluth Public Library on branch libraries and providing services in working-class neighborhoods.
82	Lincoln Park	Lincoln Park	May 1, 2026 (#100012952)	25th Ave. W. and 5th St. 46°46′05″N 92°08′21″W	Duluth	Rugged creekside park—a long-serving amenity established 1889–1896 for Duluth's traditionally working-class neighborhood, with eight contributing properties including a New Deal pavilion and four bridges.
83	Lincoln School Building	Lincoln School Building	November 28, 1978 (#78003130)	225 1st St. N. 47°31′28″N 92°32′04″W	Virginia	Highly intact 1922 school exemplifying the Jacobean Revival architecture favored for educational buildings in the early 20th century.
84	Listening Point	Listening Point	December 26, 2007 (#07001316)	3128 Van Vac Rd. 47°54′11″N 92°01′01″W	Ely vicinity	Lake retreat of nationally renowned wilderness conservation advocate Sigurd F. Olson (1899–1982), with a cabin, sauna, and three other contributing properties.
85	E.J. Longyear First Diamond Drill Site	E.J. Longyear First Diamond Drill Site	July 20, 1977 (#77001526)	6500 County Rd. 666; 47°33′27″N 92°07′00″W	Hoyt Lakes	1890 site of the very first exploration diamond drilling on the Mesabi Range, the beginning of a mining industry pivotal to the history of Minnesota and the United States. Now an Iron Range Historical Society park with replica equipment.
86	Mike and Mary Matson Historic Farmstead		April 9, 1990 (#90000769)	7776 Hanka Nevala Rd. 47°40′42″N 92°12′16″W	Embarrass Township	1900 farmstead with seven contributing properties, embodying the traditional log architecture and successful conversion of cutover woodland by the area's Finnish American settlers.
87	May Flower (shipwreck)		August 28, 2012 (#12000560)	2.25 miles south of Lester River in Lake Superior; 46°48′12″N 92°00′40″W	Lester Park vicinity	Wreck of an 1887 scow schooner lost in 1891, an important example of a fairly common but little documented type of Great Lakes merchant vessel.
88	Mesaba Co-operative Park	Mesaba Co-operative Park	May 28, 2019 (#100003961)	3827 Mesaba Park Rd. 47°23′41″N 92°47′47″W	Hibbing vicinity	160-acre (65 ha) park established as a cooperative retreat for Finnish Americans in 1928, with 17 contributing properties built 1928–1959. Also significant as a center of radical politics and the Minnesota Farmer–Labor Party, and a target of the Red Scare.
89	Minnesota Point Lighthouse	Minnesota Point Lighthouse	December 27, 1974 (#74002206)	Minnesota Point; 46°42′36″N 92°01′33″W	Duluth	Ruins of the first high-powered lighthouse on Lake Superior, active 1858–1878, and the zero-point for all original surveys of the lake.
90	Mitchell-Tappan House	Mitchell-Tappan House	December 2, 1980 (#80004352)	2145 4th Ave. 47°25′31″N 92°56′18″W	Hibbing	Large 1905 house built as a residence for Oliver Iron Mining Company executives, reflecting the sumptuous lifestyle enjoyed by an elite few in the early mining era. Now a bed and breakfast.
91	Bergetta Moe Bakery	Bergetta Moe Bakery	June 3, 1976 (#76002175)	716 E. Superior St. 46°47′36″N 92°05′22″W	Duluth	One of Duluth's oldest standing buildings, constructed circa 1875 in the simple wood-frame, gabled style that exemplified the city's first-generation architecture.
92	Monson's Hoist Bay Resort	Monson's Hoist Bay Resort	June 15, 2011 (#11000362)	Hoist Bay, Namakan Lake; 48°25′05″N 92°44′55″W	Voyageurs National Park	Family-owned resort established in 1939 to serve the growing phenomenon of middle-class tourists, with nine contributing properties built 1941–1968.
93	Mountain Iron Mine	Mountain Iron Mine	November 24, 1968 (#68000052)	North of Mountain Iron; 47°32′20″N 92°37′25″W	Mountain Iron	Open-pit mine active 1892–1956, the first mine opened on the Mesabi Range—the world's largest known iron ore deposit, which helped make Minnesota the nation's largest iron producer and the United States the largest steel manufacturer.
94	Munger Terrace	Munger Terrace	December 12, 1976 (#76002176)	405 Mesaba Ave. 46°47′08″N 92°06′33″W	Duluth	One of Duluth's most architecturally significant apartment buildings, designed in Châteauesque style by Oliver G. Traphagen and Francis W. Fitzpatrick and constructed 1891–92.
95	Erick and Kristina Nelimark Sauna	Erick and Kristina Nelimark Sauna	April 9, 1990 (#90000770)	4839 Salo Rd. 47°39′46″N 92°11′45″W	Embarrass	Finnish sauna built circa 1930, reflecting the area's settlement by Finnish American farmers and their use of traditional log construction. Part of the Nelimark Homestead Museum.
96	Alice Nettell Tower		July 23, 2026 (#100013282)	550 N. 3rd Ave. 47°31′39″N 92°32′07″W	Virginia	14-story apartment building and parking lot constructed in 1977; the Iron Range's largest senior housing project funded by the Minnesota Housing Finance Agency.
97	Northland	Northland	July 31, 1978 (#78003129)	Based at the Duluth Depot; 46°46′53″N 92°06′15″W	Duluth	Nominated as one of the last operating private business railcars, built in 1916 for the Duluth, Missabe and Northern Railway to transport managers and important guests. Acquired by the Lake Superior Railroad Museum in 2003.
98	Olcott Park Electric Fountain and Rock Garden	Olcott Park Electric Fountain and Rock Garden	June 5, 2017 (#100001026)	NW. quadrant of Olcott Park, 9th St. N. & 9th Ave. N. 47°31′47″N 92°33′05″W	Virginia	1937 fountain and landscaping, significant as a unique and popular amenity produced by the Works Progress Administration and for its novel colored light display from General Electric.
99	Sigurd F. Olson Writing Shack	Sigurd F. Olson Writing Shack	June 3, 2020 (#100005249)	106 E. Wilson St. 47°53′44″N 91°51′54″W	Ely	One-room writing studio and rustic grounds of conservationist Sigurd F. Olson from 1937 until his death in 1982. Preserved as a museum by the Listening Point Foundation.
100	Ordean Building	Ordean Building	November 10, 2025 (#100012387)	424 W. Superior St. 46°46′56″N 92°06′13″W	Duluth	Headquarters and multi-tenant social services center built in 1974 by the Ordean Foundation to modernize its influential philanthropic work in Duluth and northeastern Minnesota. Listing includes a 1971 plaza.
101	Orr Roadside Parking Area	Orr Roadside Parking Area	September 6, 2002 (#02000937)	4573 U.S. Route 53; 48°03′33″N 92°49′50″W	Orr	Exemplary early wayside rest developed 1935–38 by the Minnesota Department of Highways in collaboration with New Deal agencies. Also noted for its National Park Service rustic design by landscape architect Arthur R. Nichols.
102	Pioneer Mine Buildings and "A" Headframe	Pioneer Mine Buildings and "A" Headframe	November 28, 1978 (#78003127)	401 N. Pioneer Rd. 47°54′43″N 91°51′38″W	Ely	One of only two surviving examples of the Vermilion Range's numerous underground mine complexes, in operation 1889–1967. Now the Ely Arts & Heritage Center.
103	Anna and Mikko Pyhala Farm	Anna and Mikko Pyhala Farm	June 12, 2003 (#03000521)	4745 Salo Rd. 47°39′46″N 92°11′11″W	Embarrass	Highly intact farm with eight contributing properties built circa-1895–1931, reflecting the agricultural efforts and traditional log architecture of the area's Finnish American settlers. Now a visitor attraction.
104	Robert Wallace (bulk carrier) shipwreck site	Robert Wallace (bulk carrier) shipwreck site	October 14, 2009 (#09000828)	7 miles south of Knife River; 46°50′50″N 91°43′44″W	Palmers vicinity	Largely untouched wreck of an 1882 iron-reinforced wooden steam barge sunk in 1902, with significant research potential on the formative design and shipboard life of the first lake freighters.
105	Sacred Heart Cathedral, Sacred Heart School and Christian Brothers Home	Sacred Heart Cathedral, Sacred Heart School and Christian Brothers Home	June 26, 1986 (#86001382)	206 and 211 W. 4th St., 315 N. 2nd Ave. W. 46°47′15″N 92°06′19″W	Duluth	Prominent Gothic Revival church—seat of the Roman Catholic Diocese of Duluth from 1896 to 1957—plus a 1904 school and (from boundary increase #05000446, listed May 19, 2005) a 1907 monastic faculty residence attesting to its educational efforts.
106	St. George Serbian Orthodox Church	St. George Serbian Orthodox Church	April 4, 2024 (#100010193)	1216 104th Ave. W. 46°40′11″N 92°13′51″W	Duluth	Church built 1923–24, with a 1972 addition and 1950 parish house, noted for its Neo-Byzantine architecture and longstanding importance to a Serbian American congregation.
107	St. Louis County 4-H Club Camp	St. Louis County 4-H Club Camp	March 4, 1985 (#85000456)	100 Pine Ln. 47°28′25″N 92°20′48″W	Biwabik Township	1934 camp complex noted for its exemplary log construction and unique origin, built with the prize money from a nationwide competition for the county with the best 4-H program. Now Camp Esquagama.
108	St. Louis County District Courthouse	St. Louis County District Courthouse	June 18, 1992 (#92000798)	300 S. 5th Ave. 47°31′15″N 92°32′16″W	Virginia	1910 Beaux-Arts courthouse expanded in 1921, long-serving home of county government on the Iron Range following the creation of a separate judicial district on account of its distance from Duluth.
109	St. Mark's African Methodist Episcopal Church	St. Mark's African Methodist Episcopal Church	April 16, 1991 (#91000439)	530 N. 5th Ave. E. 46°47′45″N 92°05′53″W	Duluth	Church serving as a religious and social center for Duluth's African-American community, completed in 1913 as the city's only building constructed by and for African Americans.
110	Saints Peter and Paul Church-Ukrainian Catholic	Saints Peter and Paul Church-Ukrainian Catholic	August 27, 1980 (#80004340)	530 Central Ave. 47°29′01″N 92°52′44″W	Chisholm	Onion-domed 1916 church that anchored a Ukrainian American community, the final arrivals of the Iron Range's turn-of-the-20th-century immigration influx.
111	Alex Seitaniemi Housebarn	Alex Seitaniemi Housebarn	April 9, 1990 (#90000771)	8162 Comet Rd. 47°42′25″N 92°08′16″W	Embarrass vicinity	Rare example of a housebarn, built circa 1907–1913; also noted for embodying the settlement and traditional log architecture of rural St. Louis County's Finnish American farmers.
112	Site 21SL1107	Site 21SL1107	September 18, 2026 (#100013415)	Address restricted	Tower vicinity	
113	Sons of Italy Hall	Sons of Italy Hall	November 25, 1980 (#80004353)	704 E. Howard St. 47°25′39″N 92°56′01″W	Hibbing	1930 hall of an Italian American fraternal society, reflecting the diversity of the Iron Range immigrant population and the unique way Hibbing's Italian community organized around clubs rather than churches.
114	Soudan Iron Mine	Soudan Iron Mine	November 13, 1966 (#66000905)	Soudan Underground Mine State Park; 47°49′10″N 92°14′32″W	Tower	The state's oldest and deepest iron mine, active 1884–1962, ushering in Minnesota's importance in iron ore production. Now a state park.
115	I.W. Stevens Lakeside Cottage	I.W. Stevens Lakeside Cottage	June 15, 2011 (#11000363)	Stevens Island, Namakan Lake; 48°26′30″N 92°44′50″W	Voyageurs National Park	Largely intact lake cabin complex established in 1932, with seven contributing properties; used as a year-round residence and a small-scale resort.
116	Stuntz Bay Boathouse Historic District	Stuntz Bay Boathouse Historic District	May 24, 2007 (#07000460)	At the northern end of Stuntz Bay Rd. 47°49′34″N 92°14′11″W	Tower vicinity	Row of 145 boathouses mostly built 1900–1950 by Soudan Iron Mine employees, illustrating the personal lives of the miners and vernacular metal architecture.
117	Tanner's Hospital	Tanner's Hospital	July 28, 1980 (#80004342)	204 E. Camp St. 47°54′14″N 91°51′49″W	Ely	1901 commercial hospital built to capitalize on the high disease rate of the early Iron Range due to the mining boomtowns' low investment in sanitation infrastructure.
118	Waino Tanttari Field Hay Barn	Waino Tanttari Field Hay Barn	April 9, 1990 (#90000773)	8261 Wilen Rd. 47°42′38″N 92°09′43″W	Embarrass vicinity	Isolated 1935 log barn reflecting the conversion of northeastern Minnesota's cutover forests into farmland by late-19th and early-20th-century Finnish American settlers.
119	Thomas Wilson (Whaleback Freighter) Shipwreck	Thomas Wilson (Whaleback Freighter) Shipwreck	July 23, 1992 (#92000844)	7/8 of a mile outside the Duluth Harbor entrance 46°47′00″N 92°04′10″W	Duluth vicinity	1892 freight steamer sunk in Duluth Harbor in 1902. Wreck is one of the best surviving examples of whaleback design.
120	Tower Fire Hall	Tower Fire Hall	July 17, 1980 (#80004355)	Main St. 47°48′18″N 92°16′30″W	Tower	Oldest surviving fire station in the Iron Range cities, built circa 1895, reflecting the region's serious danger of and response to fires.
121	Oliver G. Traphagen House	Oliver G. Traphagen House	April 4, 1975 (#75002091)	1509–1511 E. Superior St. 46°48′06″N 92°04′46″W	Duluth	1892 duplex designed and inhabited by Oliver G. Traphagen (1854–1932), recognized together with his business partner Francis W. Fitzpatrick as Duluth's leading architects of the late 19th century.
122	United Protestant Church	United Protestant Church	August 1, 2024 (#100010635)	830 88th Ave. W. 46°41′41″N 92°12′42″W	Duluth	1922 Gothic Revival church built with concrete blocks, uniquely juxtaposing a mass-produced building material with an architectural style meant to evoke an artisanal, preindustrial past.
123	United States Army Corps of Engineers Duluth Vessel Yard	United States Army Corps of Engineers Duluth Vessel Yard	October 23, 1995 (#95001163)	901 Minnesota Ave. 46°46′32″N 92°05′34″W	Duluth	Federal facility instrumental in developing and maintaining the harbor that underpins the Twin Ports economy, with 10 contributing properties largely intact since the 1940s.
124	US Fisheries Station, Duluth	US Fisheries Station, Duluth	November 28, 1978 (#78003126)	6008 London Rd. 46°50′10″N 92°00′26″W	Duluth	Four-building fish hatchery complex exemplifying the Shingle and Stick styles popular during its 1880s construction; converted to a University of Minnesota Duluth research station in the 1950s.
125	USS Essex Shipwreck Site	USS Essex Shipwreck Site	April 14, 1994 (#94000342)	Lake Superior; 46°42′46″N 92°01′43″W	Duluth	Remains of a U.S Navy steam sloop active 1876–1903, scrapped and burned to the waterline in 1931. Only surviving remnants of a vessel by influential shipbuilder Donald McKay.
126	Valon Tuote Raittiusseura	Valon Tuote Raittiusseura	August 24, 1979 (#79003199)	125 3rd St. N. 47°31′34″N 92°31′58″W	Virginia	Long-serving meeting hall used by various Finnish American organizations, built around 1906 by a temperance society.
127	Virginia Brewery	Virginia Brewery	August 27, 1980 (#80004363)	305 S. 7th Ave. 47°31′16″N 92°32′34″W	Virginia	Distinctive 1905 example of the local breweries that contributed to the Iron Range's economic and (through athletic sponsorships) social life prior to Prohibition and competition from larger brands.
128	Virginia City Hall	Virginia City Hall	May 26, 2004 (#04000539)	327 1st St. S. 47°31′21″N 92°32′11″W	Virginia	1923 city hall, the long-serving seat of Virginia's municipal government.
129	Virginia Commercial Historic District	Virginia Commercial Historic District	January 31, 1997 (#97000020)	Chestnut St. between 1st and 6th Aves. 47°31′23″N 92°32′09″W	Virginia	Representative early-20th-century business district and an artifact of Virginia's development as a mining boomtown and tourism gateway, with 78 contributing properties built 1900–1941.
130	Virginia-Rainy Lake Lumber Company Manager's Residence	Virginia-Rainy Lake Lumber Company Manager's Residence	August 18, 1980 (#80004361)	402 and 404 S. 5th Ave. 47°31′13″N 92°32′18″W	Virginia	Well-appointed manager's residence built in 1910 by the area's largest lumber company, reflecting the social distance enforced between industry elites and laborers.
131	Virginia-Rainy Lake Lumber Company Office	Virginia-Rainy Lake Lumber Company Office	August 26, 1980 (#80004365)	731 3rd St. S. 47°31′14″N 92°32′38″W	Virginia	Circa-1907 headquarters of the region's largest lumber company, one of the Iron Range's few major industries aside from mining.
132	Virginia Recreation Building	Virginia Recreation Building	February 4, 1982 (#82004711)	305 1st St. S. 47°31′21″N 92°32′08″W	Virginia	Public sports facility built in 1923 to provide physical development opportunities for miners, converted to a shirt factory in 1947 to create jobs for women and diversify the local economy.
133	Western Bohemian Fraternal Union Hall	Western Bohemian Fraternal Union Hall	July 31, 1986 (#86002123)	County Rd. 29; 47°02′53″N 92°44′46″W	Meadowlands vicinity	1925 Western Bohemian Fraternal Association meeting hall, a long-serving rural venue for the preservation of Czech American culture and heritage.
134	William A. Irvin (freighter)	William A. Irvin (freighter)	July 13, 1989 (#89000858)	Minnesota Slip in Duluth Harbor; 46°46′58″N 92°05′50″W	Duluth	U.S. Steel's flagship lake freighter, in service 1938–1978; significant for its role in Great Lakes maritime commerce and its innovative design features. Now a museum ship.
135	Wirth Building	Wirth Building	July 25, 1991 (#91000896)	13 W. Superior St. 46°47′12″N 92°05′56″W	Duluth	Duluth's first Richardsonian Romanesque building—constructed in 1886—and a key early work of prominent local architect Oliver G. Traphagen. Also a contributing property to the Duluth Commercial Historic District.
136	YWCA of Duluth	YWCA of Duluth	June 1, 2011 (#11000325)	202 W. 2nd St. 46°47′10″N 92°06′10″W	Duluth	1908 headquarters of the Duluth YWCA, associated with local civic development through its social welfare efforts.

== Former listings ==
	Name on the Register	Image	Date listed	Date removed	Location	City or town	Description
1	Eveleth Manual Training School	Eveleth Manual Training School	August 18, 1980 (#80004343)	March 28, 2024	Roosevelt Ave. 47°27′51″N 92°32′00″W	Eveleth	Minnesota's first vocational school, built in 1914 to prepare local workers for the increasing mechanization of the mining industry. Also noted for its Modern architecture.
2	John Harris Hearding Grammar and High School and John A. Johnson Grammar School		January 16, 1997 (#96001593)	June 11, 2003	4th Ave. N. and 1st St. W.	Aurora	1912 and 1914 public schools. Demolished in 2001.
3	Otto Johnson House		November 25, 1980 (#80004354)	October 2, 1998	202 3rd Ave.	Mountain Iron	Whimsical 1912 cottage, statuary, and landscaping of folk artist Otto Johnson. Fell into disrepair and demolished by later owner in 1997.

== See also ==
- List of National Historic Landmarks in Minnesota
- National Register of Historic Places listings in Minnesota
- National Register of Historic Places listings in Voyageurs National Park
