= LeMoine Building =

- U.S. National Register of Historic Places
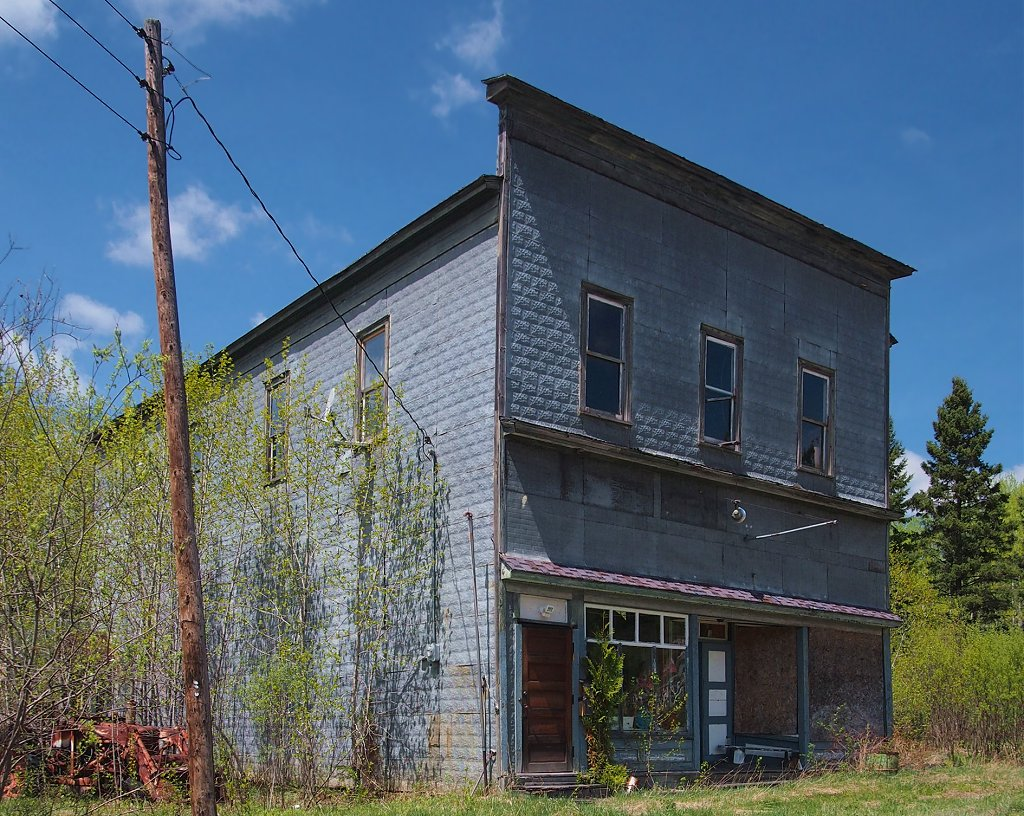
- The LeMoine Building viewed from the southeast

- Location within Minnesota Location within the United States
- Location: Taft Street, Gheen, Minnesota
- Coordinates: 47°58′6″N 92°48′37″W
- Area: Less than one acre
- Built: 1913
- NRHP reference No.: 89000140
- Added to NRHP: March 2, 1989

The LeMoine Building is a historic commercial building in the unincorporated community of Gheen, Minnesota, United States. It was built in 1913. In 1989 it was listed on the National Register of Historic Places for its local significance in the theme of commerce. It was nominated for being one of northern Minnesota's few surviving examples of the once-common false-fronted commercial building and the most intact historic building in the lumber-era townsite of Gheen.

== See also ==
- National Register of Historic Places listings in St. Louis County, Minnesota
