= Chisholm Commercial Historic District =

Historic downtown of Chisholm, Minnesota

- U.S. National Register of Historic Places
- U.S. Historic district
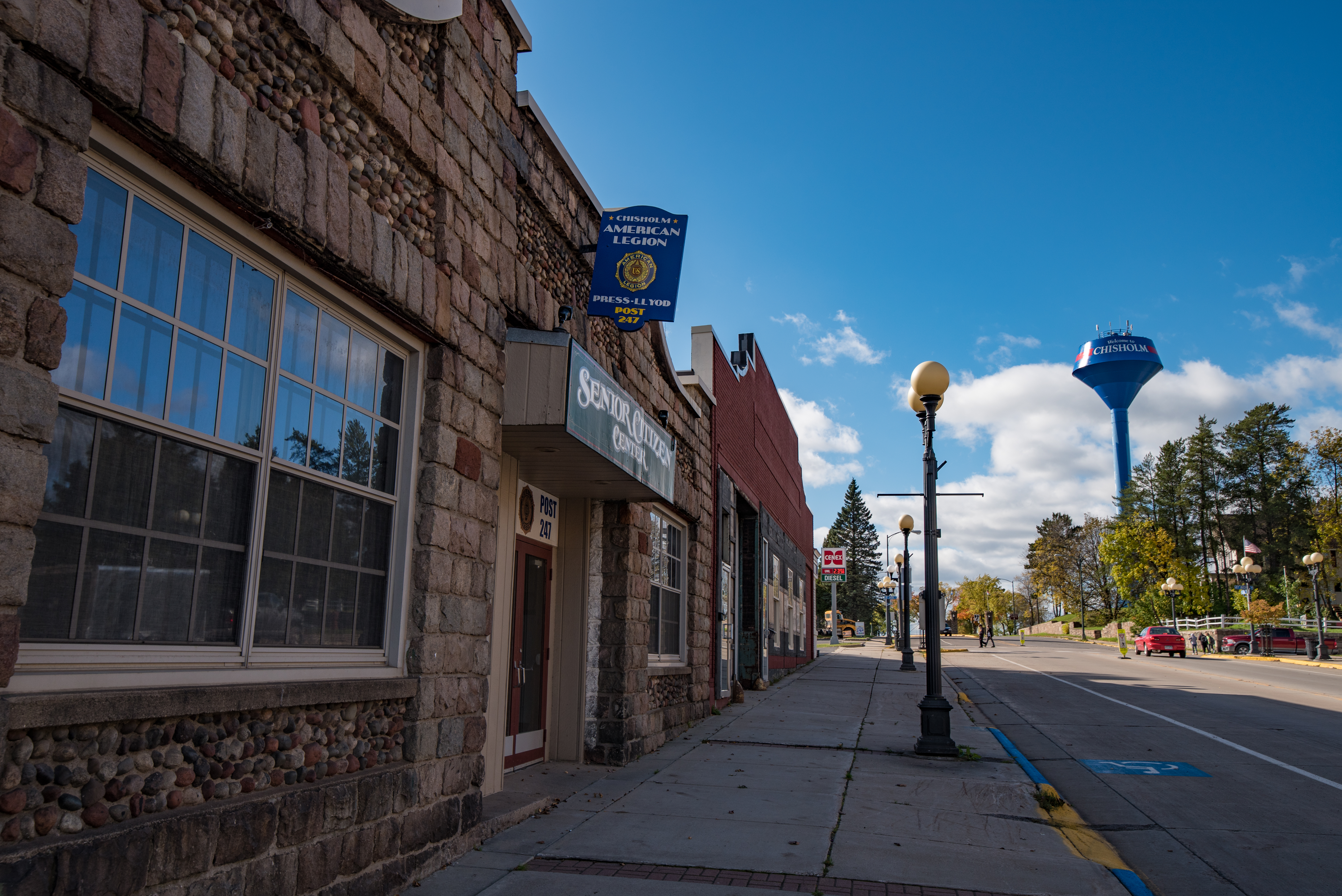
- The 300 block of W. Lake Street looking west

- Location within Minnesota Location within the United States
- Location: W. Lake Street between Central Ave. & 4th Ave., east side of Central Ave between 1st St. NE & 1st St. SE, and 6–8 1st Ave. SW, Chisholm, Minnesota
- Coordinates: 47°29′21″N 92°52′55″W
- Area: 19.2 acres (7.8 ha)
- Built: 1908–1929
- Architect: Multiple
- Architectural style: Neoclassical, Renaissance Revival, Romanesque Revival
- NRHP reference No.: 16000512
- Added to NRHP: August 4, 2016

The Chisholm Commercial Historic District is the historic business district of Chisholm, Minnesota, United States. It consists of one and two-story commercial buildings as well as some civic buildings and a park, all constructed after a fire on September 5, 1908, destroyed the community's original downtown and before the Wall Street Crash of 1929 put an end to Chisholm's early-20th-century heyday. The district comprises both sides of Lake Street West between Central Avenue and 4th Avenue West, as well as some properties on the east sides of Central Avenue and 1st Avenue. It was listed on the National Register of Historic Places in 2016 for its local significance in the themes of commerce, entertainment/recreation, and social history. The district was nominated for its association with the establishment of Chisholm as an economic, social, and civic hub on the Mesabi Range.

At the time of its National Register nomination, the historic district consisted of 55 contributing properties. There were also 31 non-contributing properties, either constructed after 1929 or altered in ways that compromised their historical character.

== See also ==
- National Register of Historic Places listings in St. Louis County, Minnesota
