= Hibbing Disposal Plant =

- U.S. National Register of Historic Places
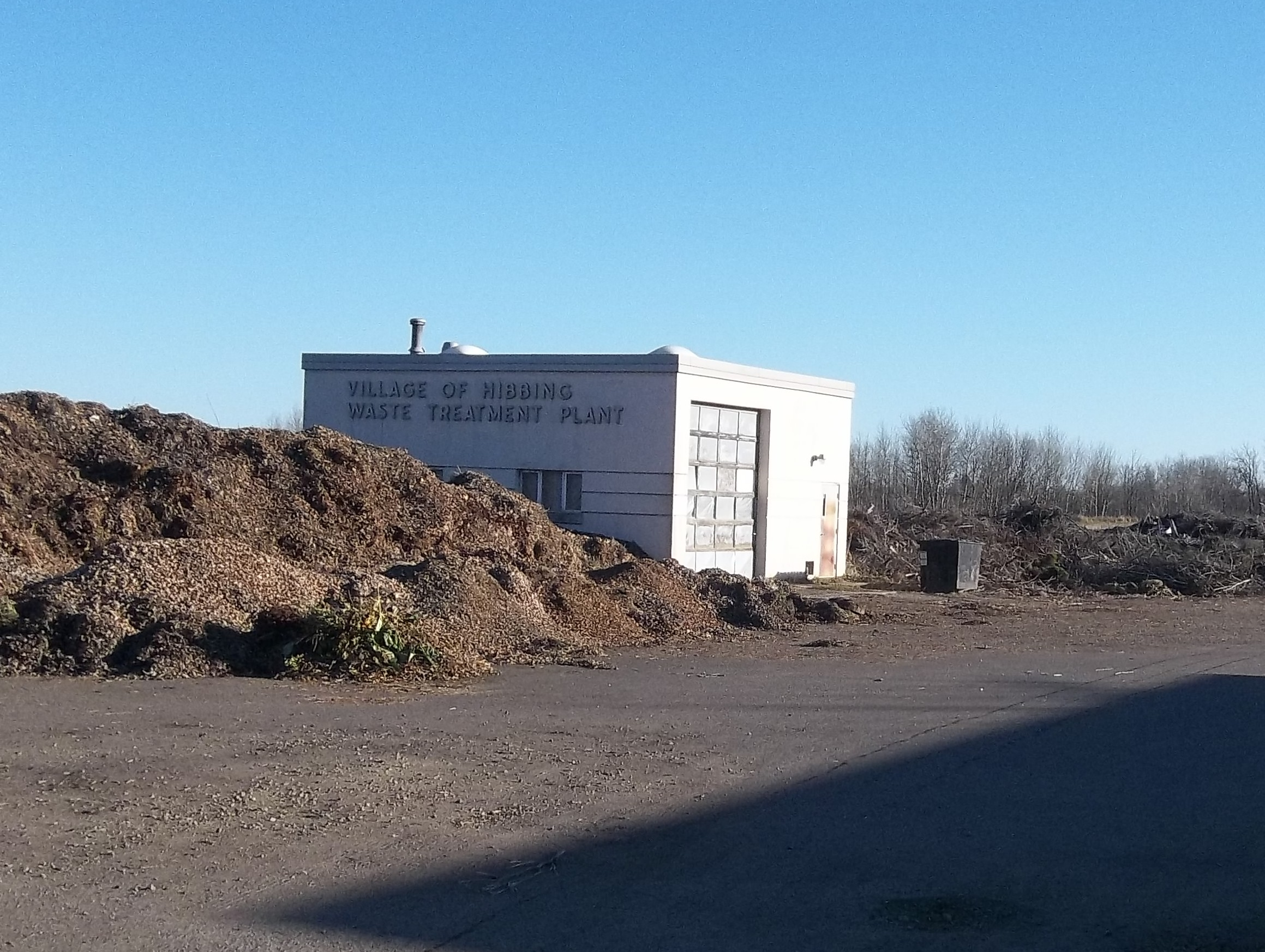
- The 1970 Grit House at the Hibbing Disposal Plant

- Location within Minnesota Location within the United States
- Location: 1300 East 23rd Street, Hibbing, Minnesota
- Coordinates: 47°25′30″N 92°54′58″W
- Area: 12 acres (4.9 ha)
- Built: 1938–39
- Built by: Roberts and Schaefer Company
- Architect: J.C. Taylor, Public Works Administration, Charles Foster
- Architectural style: Moderne
- MPS: Federal Relief Construction in Minnesota, 1933–1941
- NRHP reference No.: 91001022
- Added to NRHP: August 9, 1991

The Hibbing Disposal Plant, later known as the North Wastewater Treatment Plant, was a sewage treatment plant in Hibbing, Minnesota, United States. It was built from 1938 to 1939 as a Public Works Administration (PWA) project during the Great Depression, and contained two of the world's largest self-supporting reinforced concrete domes. The plant was listed on the National Register of Historic Places in 1991 for its local significance in the themes of engineering, health/medicine, and social history. It was nominated for being an example of the modern sanitation facilities provided to many communities for the first time through the New Deal. It was also significant as one of the largest PWA projects in northern Minnesota, for its impact on sanitation in Hibbing, and for the engineering of its trickling filter domes.

The city of Hibbing phased out operations of the disposal plant in the early 21st century and by 2012 had secured a grant to raze the property. As of 2018 the only remaining buildings on site are non-historic additions from later in the 20th century.

== See also ==
- National Register of Historic Places listings in St. Louis County, Minnesota
