= Civilian Conservation Corps Camp S-52 =

Historic buildings in Cusson, Minnesota

- U.S. National Register of Historic Places
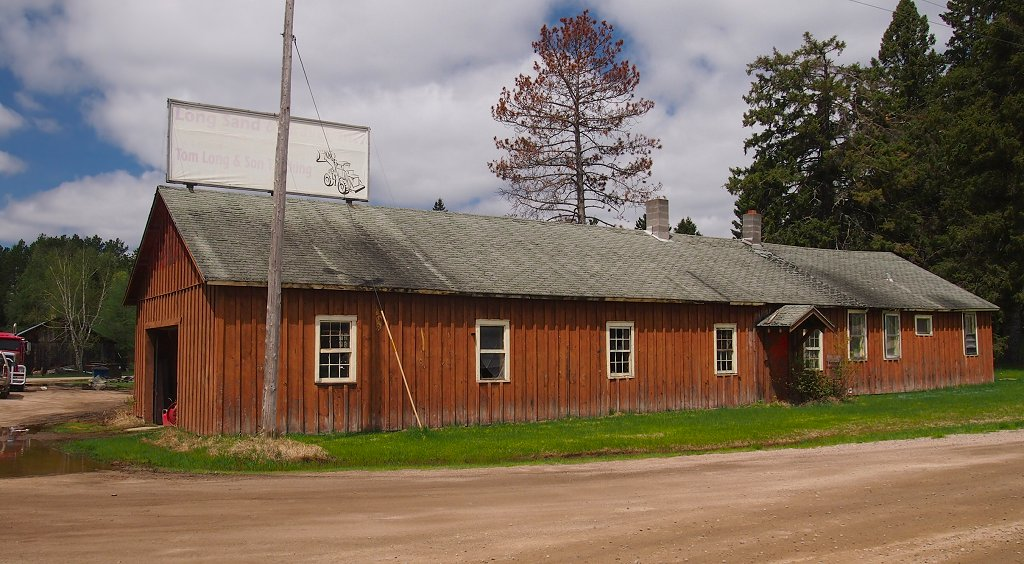
- Civilian Conservation Corps Camp S-52 from the southeast

- Location within Minnesota Location within the United States
- Location: Cusson Loop Road, Cusson, Minnesota
- Coordinates: 48°6′5″N 92°50′39″W
- Area: 1.75 acres (0.71 ha)
- Built: Circa 1933
- Architect: Civilian Conservation Corps
- NRHP reference No.: 89000158
- Added to NRHP: March 2, 1989

Civilian Conservation Corps Camp S-52 is a former forestry camp of the Civilian Conservation Corps (CCC) in the unincorporated community of Cusson, Minnesota, United States. Four workshops built around 1933 survive from the time of the camp, which was one of the 25 original CCC camps established in Minnesota in the first year of the program. The buildings were listed on the National Register of Historic Places in 1989 for their local significance in the theme of politics/government. They were nominated for being the area's only known surviving CCC buildings. Civilian Conservation Corps camps were typically populated with simple utilitarian structures only intended for temporary use, and thus few survive to the present day.

== See also ==
- National Register of Historic Places listings in St. Louis County, Minnesota
