= Hotel Glode =

- U.S. National Register of Historic Places
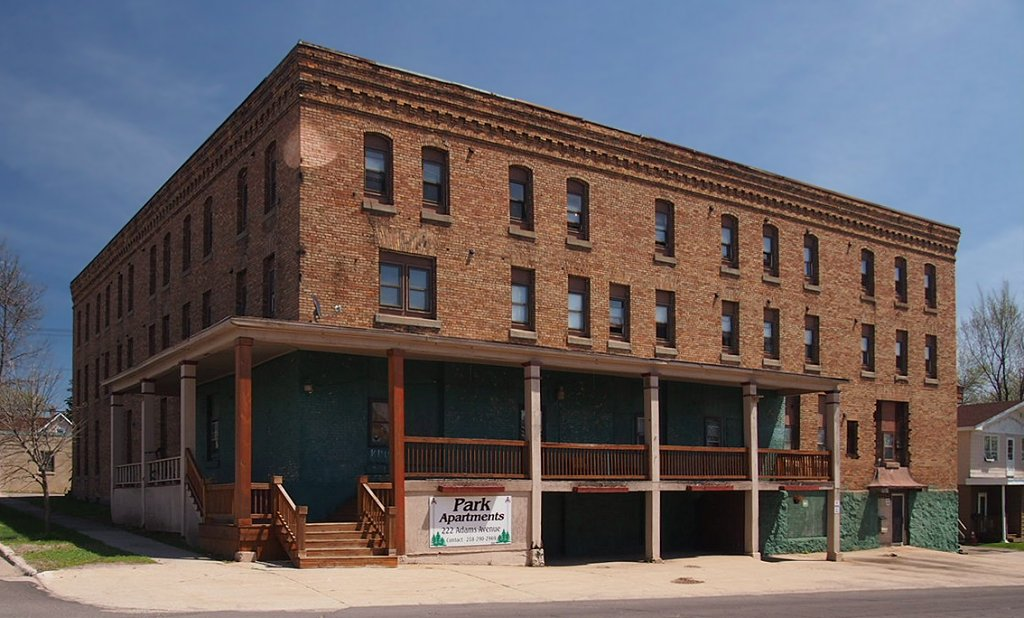
- The Hotel Glode viewed from the northwest

- Location within Minnesota Location within the United States
- Location: 222 Adams Avenue, Eveleth, Minnesota
- Coordinates: 47°27′44″N 92°32′15.5″W
- Area: Less than one acre
- Built: 1904
- NRHP reference No.: 80004346
- Added to NRHP: November 25, 1980

The Hotel Glode is a former hotel building in Eveleth, Minnesota, United States. It also served as a depot on the Mesaba Railway, active 1912–1927 as the first interurban mass transit system on the Iron Range. The Hotel Glode was listed on the National Register of Historic Places in 1980 for its local significance in the themes of commerce and transportation. It was nominated for its role as both an important local hotel and a stop on an early mass transit system.

== See also ==
- National Register of Historic Places listings in St. Louis County, Minnesota
