= Alango School =

Historic school building in northern Minnesota

- U.S. National Register of Historic Places
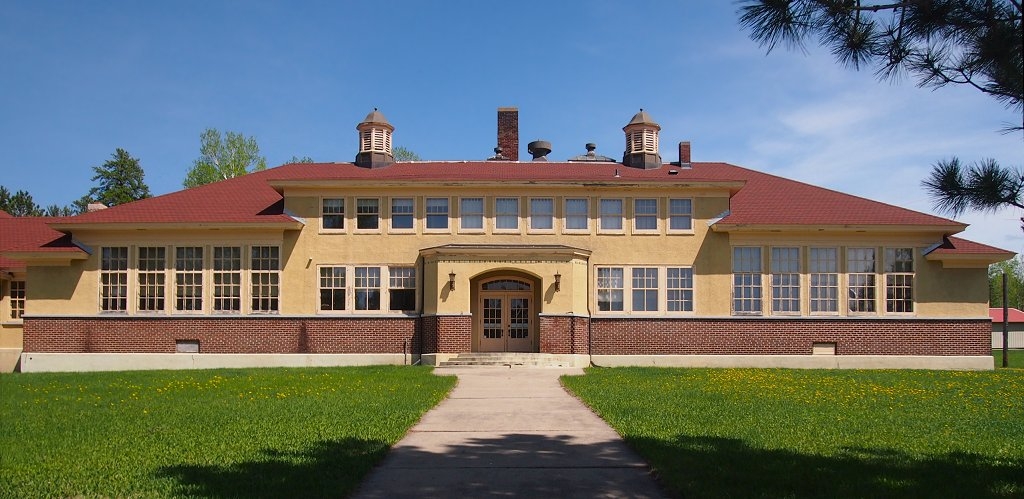
- Alango School viewed from the west

- Location within Minnesota Location within the United States
- Location: 9076 Highway 25, Alango Township, Minnesota
- Coordinates: 47°46′25″N 92°47′35″W
- Area: 10 acres (4.0 ha)
- Built: 1927
- Architect: Elwin H. Berg
- NRHP reference No.: 80004338
- Added to NRHP: July 17, 1980

Alango School is a former school building in Alango Township, Minnesota, United States. It was built in 1927 in a sparsely populated area of northern Minnesota that was still in the early stages of being homesteaded and settled by Euro-Americans. Owing to its remoteness, the school was provided with living quarters for the principal and faculty. Alango School was listed on the National Register of Historic Places in 1980 for its local significance in the theme of education. It was nominated for being a large and well-preserved example of northern Minnesota's rural schools.

== History ==
Alango Township's earlier two-room school burned down in 1926, forcing high school classes to move into a local private home until this facility was completed the following year. At the time the area still lacked good roads and public utilities, so the school was designed with its own state-of-the-art electric generating plant, wood-fired furnace, and indoor plumbing. The second floor served as a teacherage, with school-year living quarters for up to six faculty members and a shared cooking and dining area. A one-room schoolhouse was moved nearby from Bear River, Minnesota, to house the principal and his family.

A gymnasium/auditorium with additional classroom space and locker rooms was built onto the north side of the school from 1937 to 1938 with federal funding from the Public Works Administration and Works Progress Administration. At the same time the principal's house—which had been a half mile away—was moved onto the rear of the school property and renovated.

Alango School had to close for "Mud Week" in the 1930s and 1940s when the spring thaw made area roads impassable. The building graduated its final high school class in 1963. Alango School continued to host elementary grades and early childhood education until closing for good on February 9, 1988.

The non-profit Alango School Project formed in 2004 to preserve and interpret the building.

== See also ==
- National Register of Historic Places listings in St. Louis County, Minnesota
