= W. T. Bailey House =

House in Virginia, Minnesota

- W.T. Bailey House
- U.S. National Register of Historic Places
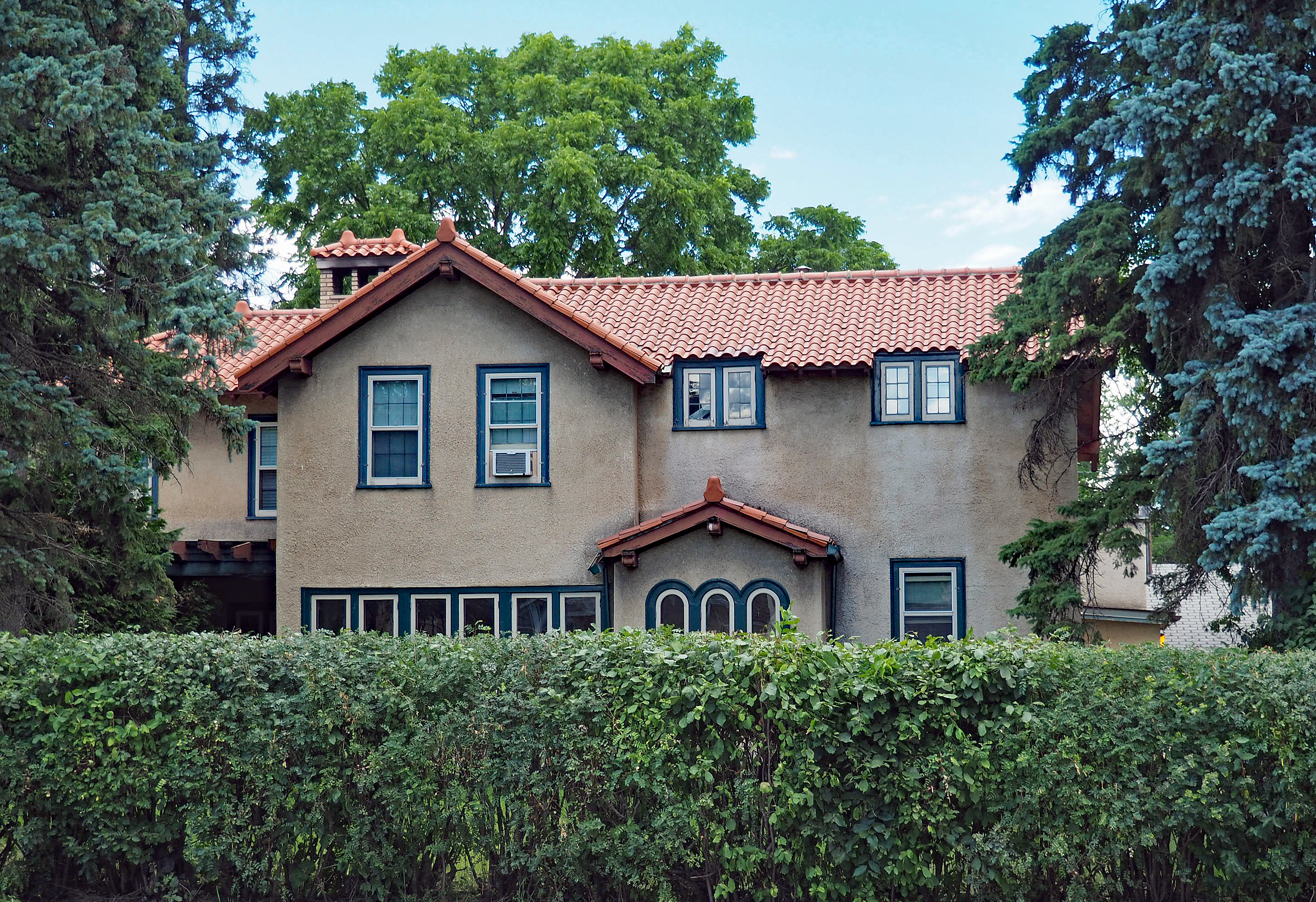
- The W.T. Bailey House viewed from the south

- Location within Minnesota Location within the United States
- Location: 816 S. 5th Avenue, Virginia, Minnesota
- Coordinates: 47°30′58.7″N 92°32′17″W
- Area: Less than one acre
- Built: Circa 1921
- Architectural style: Spanish Colonial Revival
- NRHP reference No.: 80004357
- Added to NRHP: December 4, 1980

The W. T. Bailey House is a historic house in Virginia, Minnesota, United States. It was built around 1921 in Spanish Colonial Revival style for the founder of Bailey Lumber Mill, the city's second-largest lumber company. The house was listed on the National Register of Historic Places in 1980 for its local significance in the themes of architecture, commerce, and industry. It was nominated for its association with a prominent businessman in one of Virginia's primary industries, and for illustrating the correlation between "wealth and prominence in the mining and lumbering regions and large and architecturally distinctive residences".

== See also ==
- National Register of Historic Places listings in St. Louis County, Minnesota
