= Tower Fire Hall =

- U.S. National Register of Historic Places
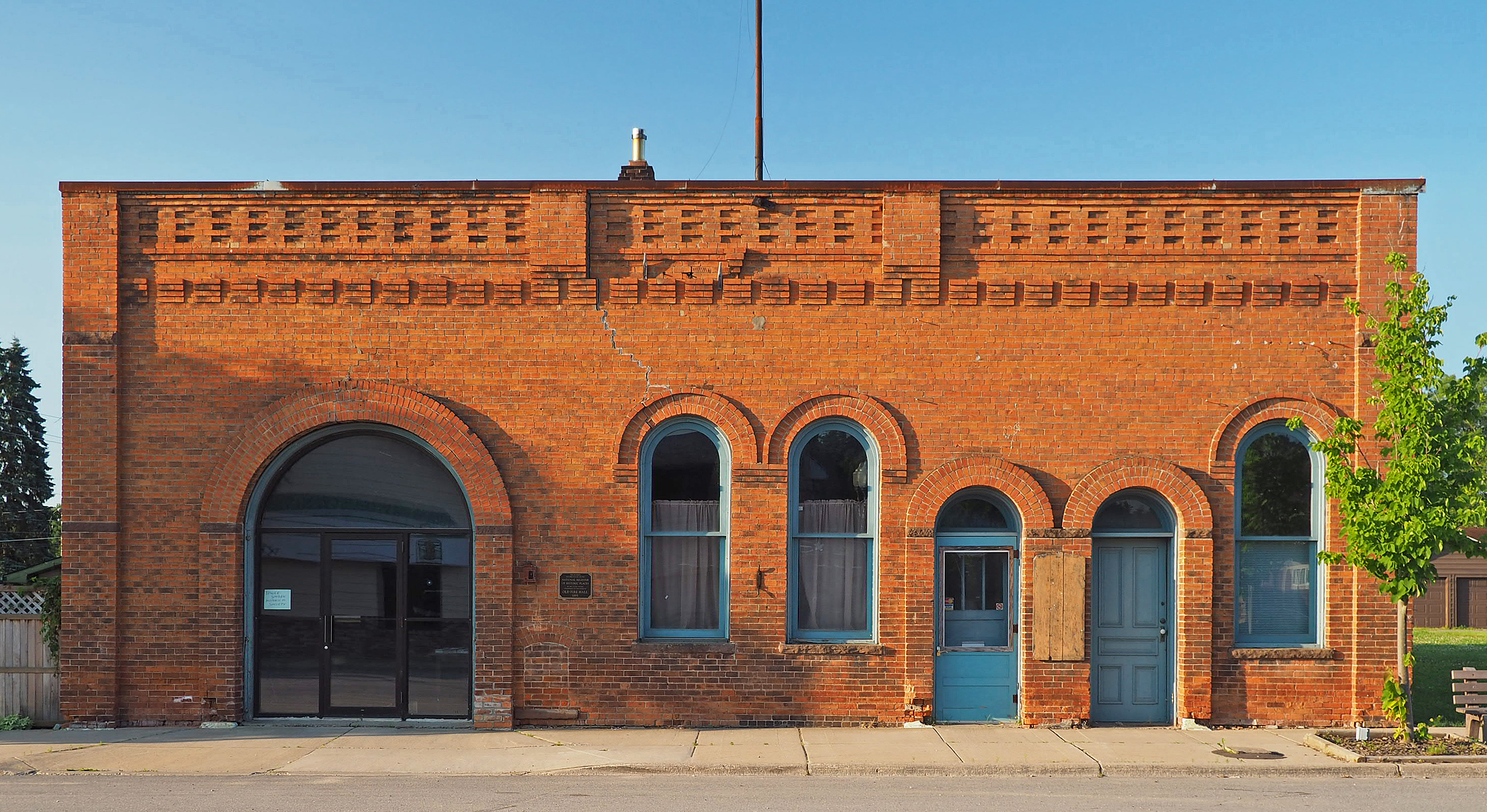
- Tower Fire Hall viewed from the north

- Location within Minnesota Location within the United States
- Location: Main Street, Tower, Minnesota
- Coordinates: 47°48′18.5″N 92°16′29.5″W
- Area: Less than one acre
- Built: c. 1895
- Architectural style: Commercial Queen Anne
- NRHP reference No.: 80004355
- Added to NRHP: July 17, 1980

Tower Fire Hall is a former fire station in Tower, Minnesota, United States. It was built around 1895 as the first fire station on the Iron Range, when the wooden construction, crowded lots, and inadequate plumbing infrastructure of the early mining boomtowns made fire a particular danger. Tower Fire Hall was listed on the National Register of Historic Places in 1980 for its local significance in the theme of social history. It was nominated for reflecting the region's serious danger of and response to fires.

== See also ==
- List of fire stations
- National Register of Historic Places listings in St. Louis County, Minnesota
