= Duluth Masonic Center =

Masonic temple

- Duluth Masonic Temple
- U.S. National Register of Historic Places
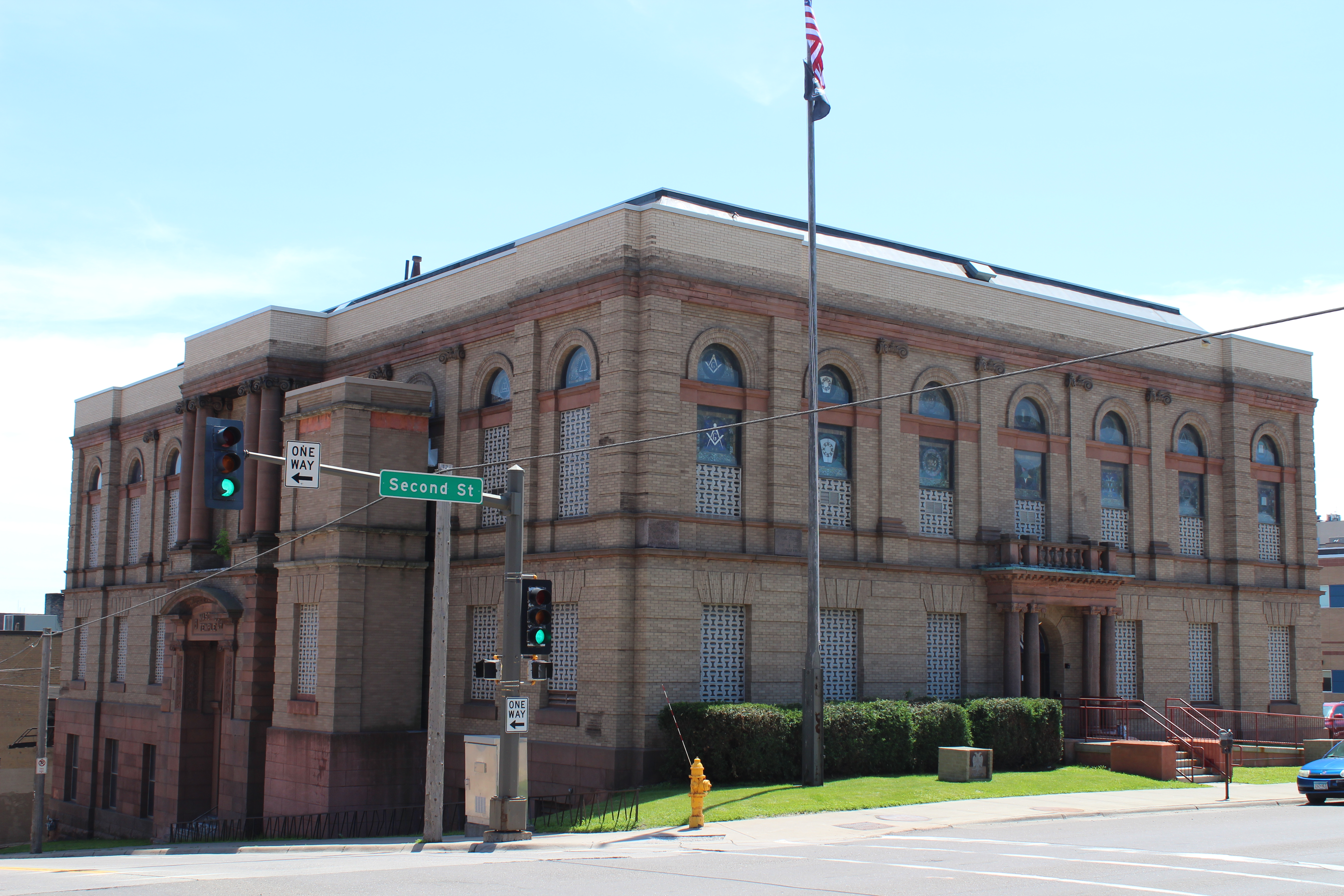
- Duluth Masonic Center viewed from the north

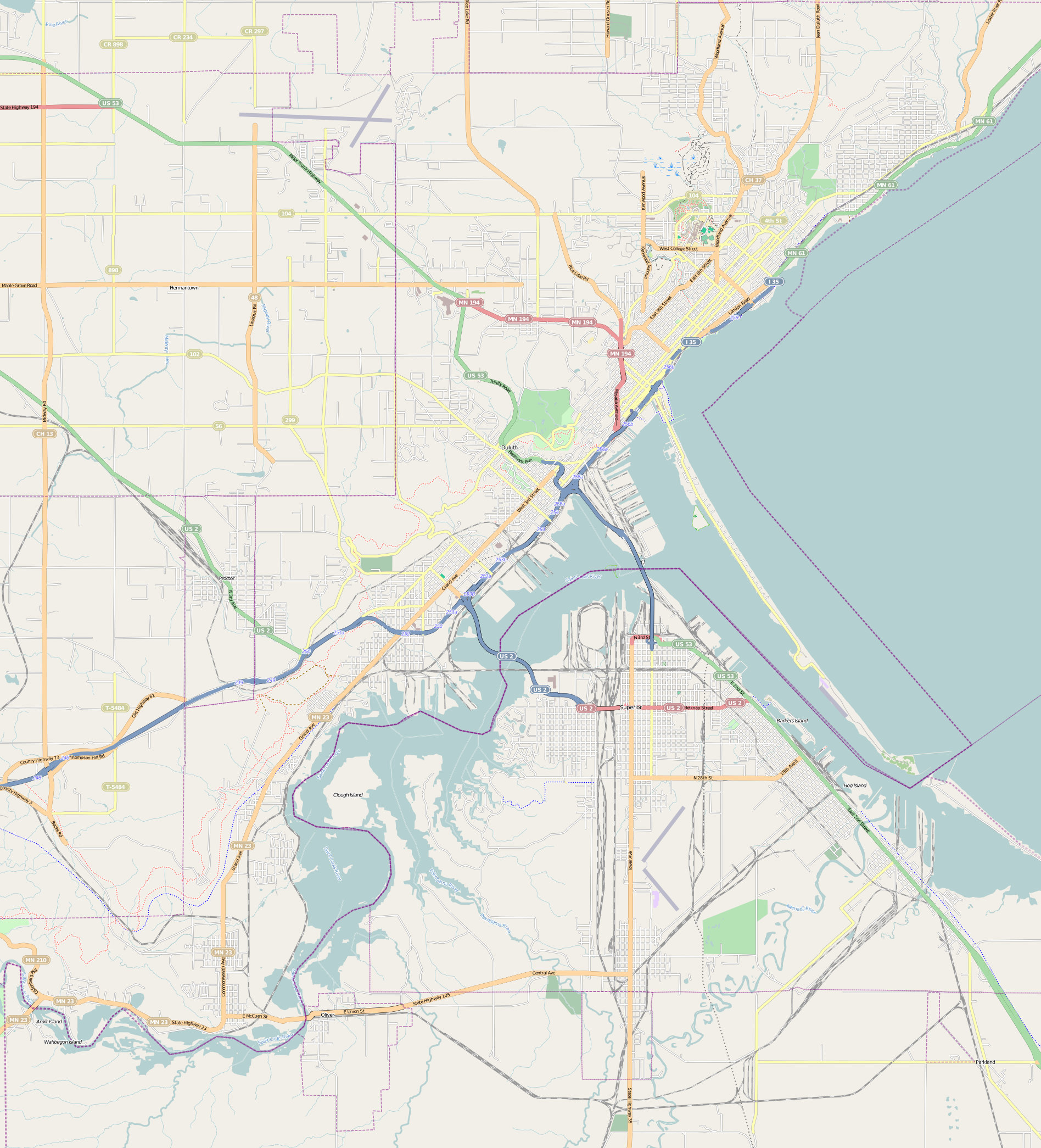
- Location within Duluth Location within Minnesota Location within the United States
- Location: 4 W. 2nd Street, Duluth, Minnesota
- Coordinates: 46°47′16.5″N 92°6′1″W
- Area: Less than one acre
- Built: 1905
- Built by: George Lounsberry
- Architect: John J. Wangenstein
- Architectural style: Beaux-Arts
- MPS: Duluth's Central Business District, MPS
- NRHP reference No.: 15000215
- Added to NRHP: May 11, 2015

The Duluth Masonic Center is a historic Masonic Temple in Duluth, Minnesota, United States. It was built in 1905 and continues to be Duluth's primary venue for Freemasonry. The building was listed on the National Register of Historic Places in 2015 under the name Duluth Masonic Temple for its significance in the themes of art and social history. It was nominated for being the longstanding focal point of Duluth's most influential fraternal organization. It was also nominated for the Egyptian-style frieze and 80 hand-painted stage backdrops (the largest operable collection still in Minnesota) contained in its Scottish Rite auditorium.

== See also ==
- List of Masonic buildings in the United States
- National Register of Historic Places listings in St. Louis County, Minnesota
