= Sons of Italy Hall =

- U.S. National Register of Historic Places
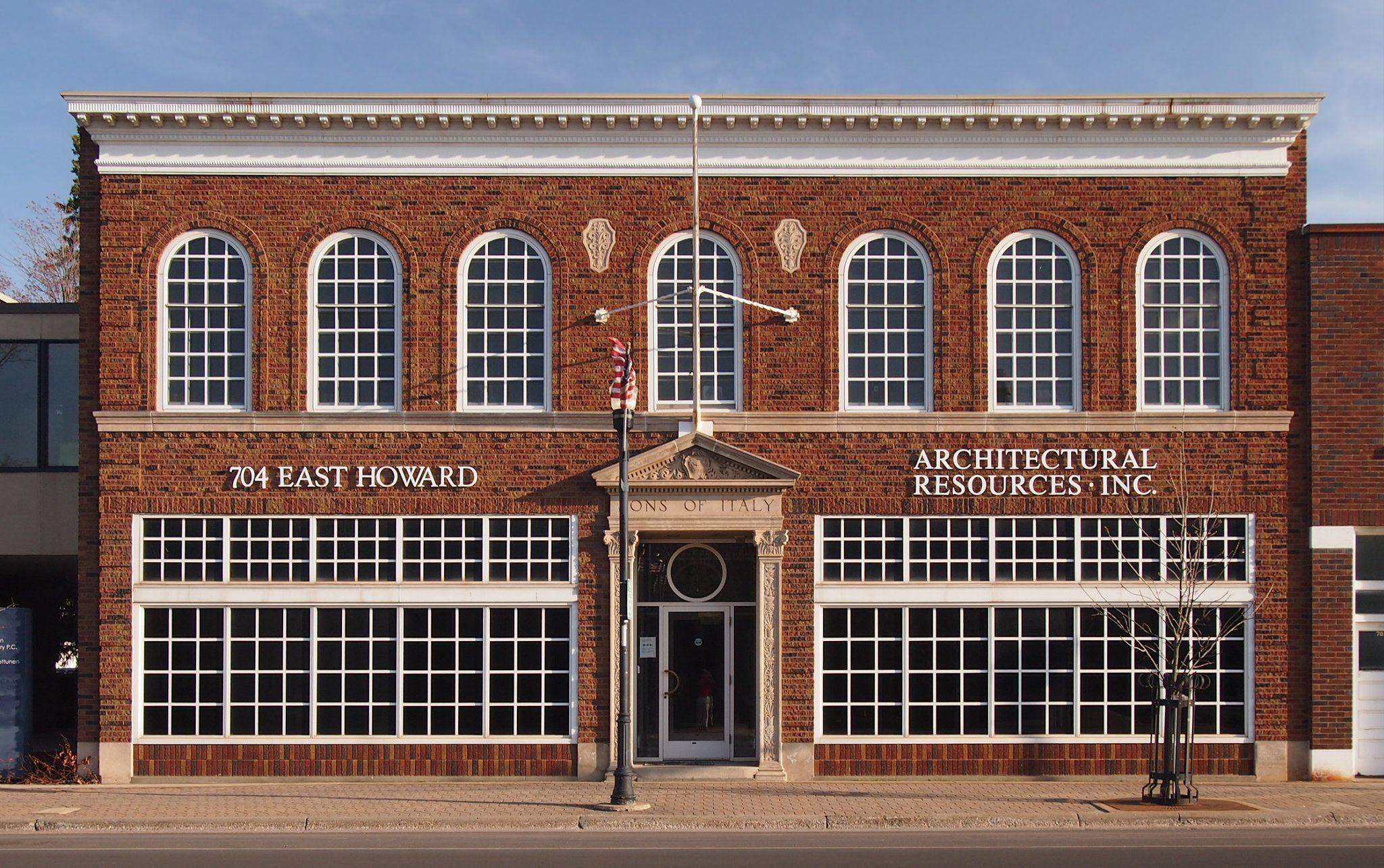
- The Sons of Italy Hall viewed from the north

- Location within Minnesota Location within the United States
- Location: 704 E. Howard Street, Hibbing, Minnesota
- Coordinates: 47°25′38.5″N 92°56′0.7″W
- Area: Less than one acre
- Built: 1930
- Architect: J.C. Taylor
- Architectural style: Renaissance Revival
- NRHP reference No.: 80004353
- Added to NRHP: November 25, 1980

The Sons of Italy Hall is the former clubhouse of an Italian-American fraternal organization in Hibbing, Minnesota, United States. It was built in 1930 and stayed active until 1968. The hall was listed on the National Register of Historic Places in 1980 for its local significance in the theme of social history. It was nominated for reflecting the diversity of the Iron Range immigrant population and the unique way Hibbing's Italian community organized around clubs rather than churches.

== See also ==
- National Register of Historic Places listings in St. Louis County, Minnesota
