= Mike and Mary Matson Farmstead =

- Mike and Mary Matson Historic Farmstead
- U.S. National Register of Historic Places
- U.S. Historic district
- Location within Minnesota Location within the United States
- Location: 7776 Hanka Nevala Road, Embarrass Township, Minnesota
- Coordinates: 47°40′42″N 92°12′16″W
- Area: 160 acres (65 ha)
- Built: c. 1900
- Architect: Gregorius Hanka
- Architectural style: Log
- MPS: Rural Finnish Log Buildings of St. Louis County, Minnesota, 1890–1930s MPS
- NRHP reference No.: 90000769
- Added to NRHP: April 9, 1990

The Mike and Mary Matson Farmstead is a historic farmstead in Embarrass Township, Minnesota, United States. It was established by a Finnish immigrant family around 1900 and includes five surviving buildings constructed with traditional Finnish log architecture. The farm was listed as a historic district on the National Register of Historic Places in 1990 for its state-level significance in the themes of agriculture, architecture, and European ethnic heritage. It was nominated for its association with the Finnish settlement and conversion of St. Louis County's cutover woodland into productive farmland, and for exhibiting their use of traditional log architecture.

== Description ==
The historic district consists of seven contributing properties, all dating to around the year 1900. Five are log buildings: a cattle barn, a hay barn, a cattle and hay barn, a stable, and a smoke sauna. All five were constructed by the Matsons' neighbor Gregorius Hanka. Rounding out the inventory of historic properties are the farm's well and agricultural fields.

== See also ==
- National Register of Historic Places listings in St. Louis County, Minnesota
