= Camp Esquagama =

Summer camp in Minnesota, United States

- St. Louis County 4-H Club Camp
- U.S. National Register of Historic Places
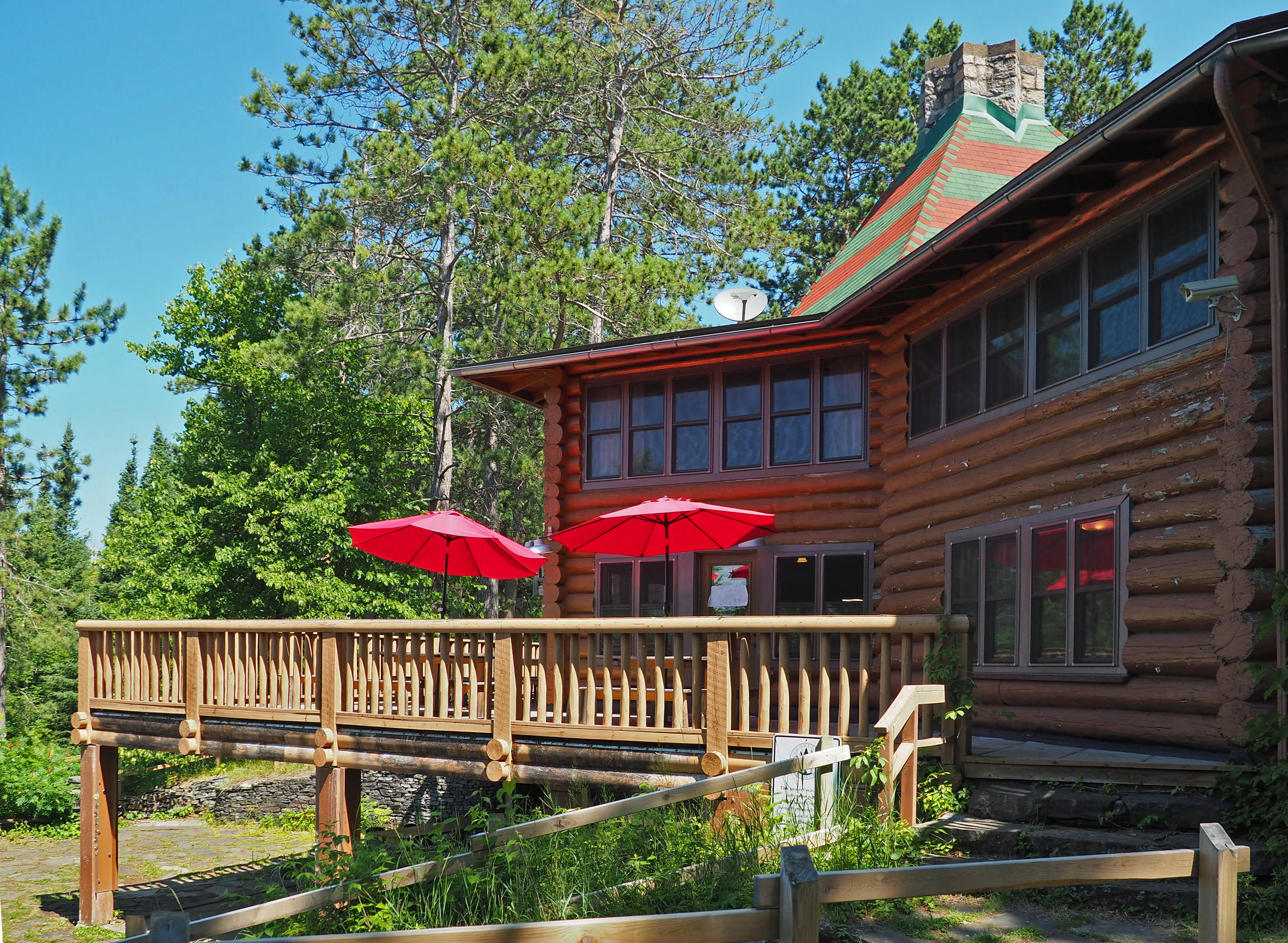
- The Camp Esquagama Lodge from the south

- Location within Minnesota Location within the United States
- Location: 4913 Pine Lane, Biwabik Township, Minnesota
- Coordinates: 47°28′26″N 92°20′48″W
- Area: 8.7 acres (3.5 ha)
- Built: 1934
- Built by: Simonson
- Architectural style: Rustic
- NRHP reference No.: 85000456
- Added to NRHP: March 4, 1985

Camp Esquagama, formerly the St. Louis County 4-H Club Camp, is a summer camp in Biwabik Township, Minnesota, United States. It was established on the east shore of Esquagama Lake in 1934 with the first place prize money from a contest to name the best county 4-H program in the nation. The logs were donated by the Oliver Iron Mining Company and labor furnished by local Civilian Conservation Corps and Works Progress Administration companies. The camp was listed on the National Register of Historic Places in 1985 for its local significance in the themes of architecture, entertainment/recreation, and social history. It was nominated for its exemplary log construction and unique origin.

Some of the activities in camp Esquagama include swimming, rock climbing, and archery, along with many more, with some being added and removed from year to year.

In 2020 the camp was closed due to COVID-19, but has since reopened.

== See also ==
- National Register of Historic Places listings in St. Louis County, Minnesota
