= Charles Lenont House =

Historic house in Minnesota, United States

- U.S. National Register of Historic Places
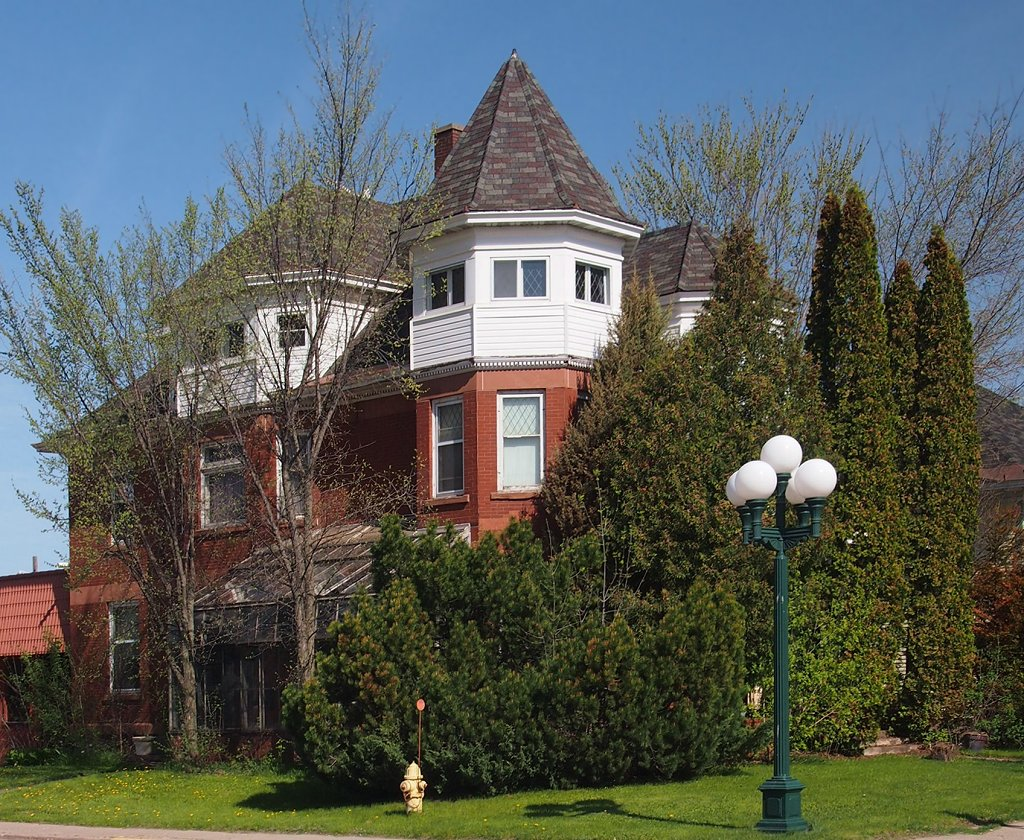
- The Charles Lenont House viewed from the southeast

- Location within Minnesota Location within the United States
- Location: 202 N. 5th Avenue, Virginia, Minnesota
- Coordinates: 47°31′27″N 92°32′20.5″W
- Area: Less than one acre
- Built: 1900
- Architectural style: Queen Anne
- NRHP reference No.: 80004359
- Added to NRHP: August 18, 1980

The Charles Lenont House is a historic house in Virginia, Minnesota, United States. It was built in 1900 for Virginia's first mayor, Marcus Fay, then sold to Dr. Charles Lenont, who resided there until 1979. In 1980 the house was listed on the National Register of Historic Places for its local significance in the themes of architecture and social history. It was nominated for being the city's best-preserved example of Queen Anne architecture and a manifestation of the class distinctions telegraphed by housing type on the early Iron Range.

== See also ==
- National Register of Historic Places listings in St. Louis County, Minnesota
