= Coates House (Virginia, Minnesota) =

House in Virginia, Minnesota, U.S.

- U.S. National Register of Historic Places
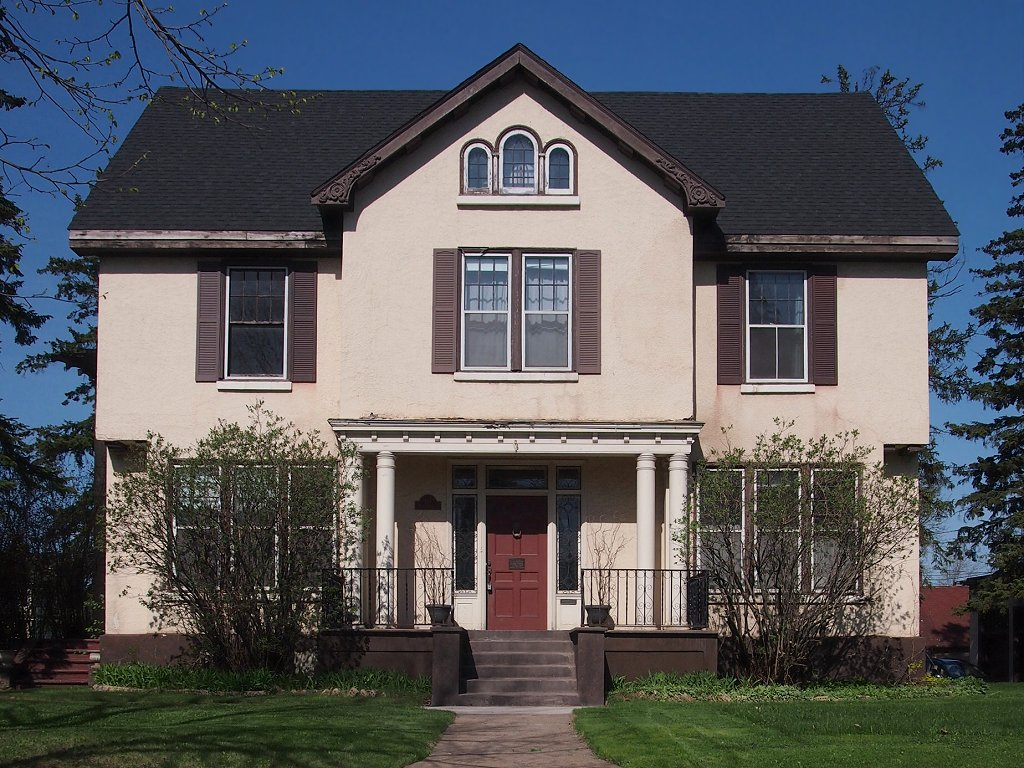
- The Coates House viewed from the east

- Location within Minnesota Location within the United States
- Location: 817 S. 5th Avenue, Virginia, Minnesota
- Coordinates: 47°30′58.5″N 92°32′19.7″W
- Area: Less than one acre
- Built: Circa 1912
- NRHP reference No.: 80004358
- Added to NRHP: August 18, 1980

The Coates House is a historic house in Virginia, Minnesota, United States. It was built around 1912 as one of the city's larger and finer residences. A succession of prominent people in the local lumber industry lived in it. The house was listed on the National Register of Historic Places in 1980 for its local significance in the themes of architecture and social history. It was nominated for demonstrating the class distinctions telegraphed by housing stock on the Iron Range at the turn of the 20th century. Large houses for the managerial class provided a sharp contrast to the boarding houses and small cottages into which the period's working class population was crowded.

== See also ==
- National Register of Historic Places listings in St. Louis County, Minnesota
