= Eveleth Manual Training School =

- Formerly listed on the U.S. National Register of Historic Places
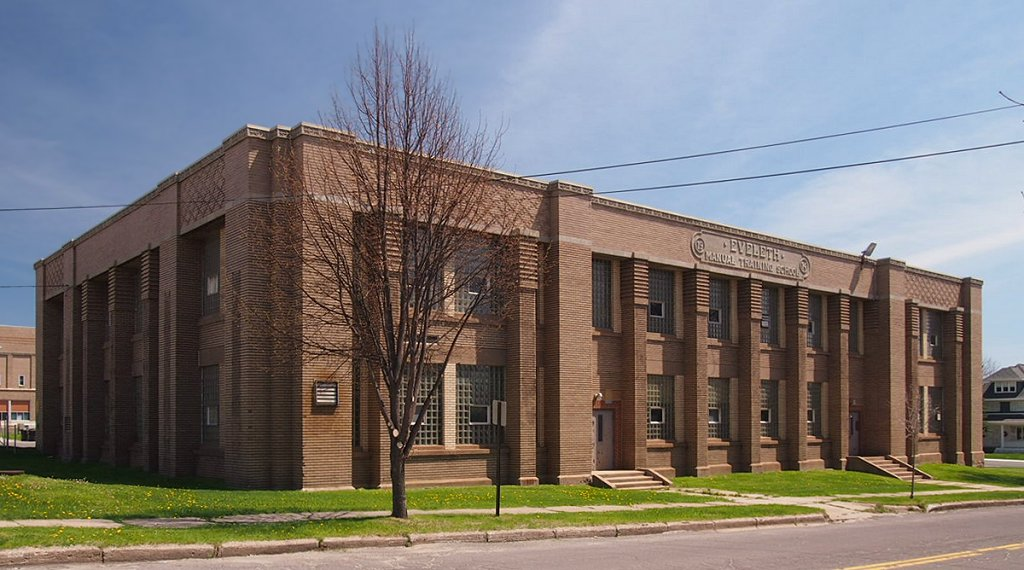
- The Eveleth Manual Training School from the northwest

- Location within Minnesota Location within the United States
- Location: Roosevelt Avenue, Eveleth, Minnesota
- Coordinates: 47°27′51″N 92°32′0″W
- Area: Less than one acre
- Built: 1914
- Architect: Bray & Nystrom
- Architectural style: Prairie School
- NRHP reference No.: 80004343

Significant dates
- Added to NRHP: August 18, 1980
- Removed from NRHP: March 28, 2024

The Eveleth Manual Training School was the first vocational school in the U.S. state of Minnesota, built in the city of Eveleth in 1914. It was a publicly funded school established to prepare workers for the increasing mechanization of the local mining industry. The school offered a two-year program for high school and adult males. Initial courses covered sheet metal work, forging, and engine repair. Within a few years classes had expanded to cover woodworking, cabinetry, plumbing, printing, mechanical drafting, and electrical work. In the 1960s and 1970s, the building was used by the Eveleth Independent School District as the "Industrial Arts Building" for 9th through 12th grade students, teaching the skills already noted.

The building was listed on the National Register of Historic Places in 1980 for its local significance in the themes of architecture, education, and industry. It was nominated as a pivotal emblem of the Progressive Era response to mass production and betterment of the working class. It was demolished in 2022 and delisted in 2024.

== See also ==
- National Register of Historic Places listings in St. Louis County, Minnesota
