= Mitchell–Tappan House =

Historic house in Minnesota, United States

- Mitchell-Tappan House
- U.S. National Register of Historic Places
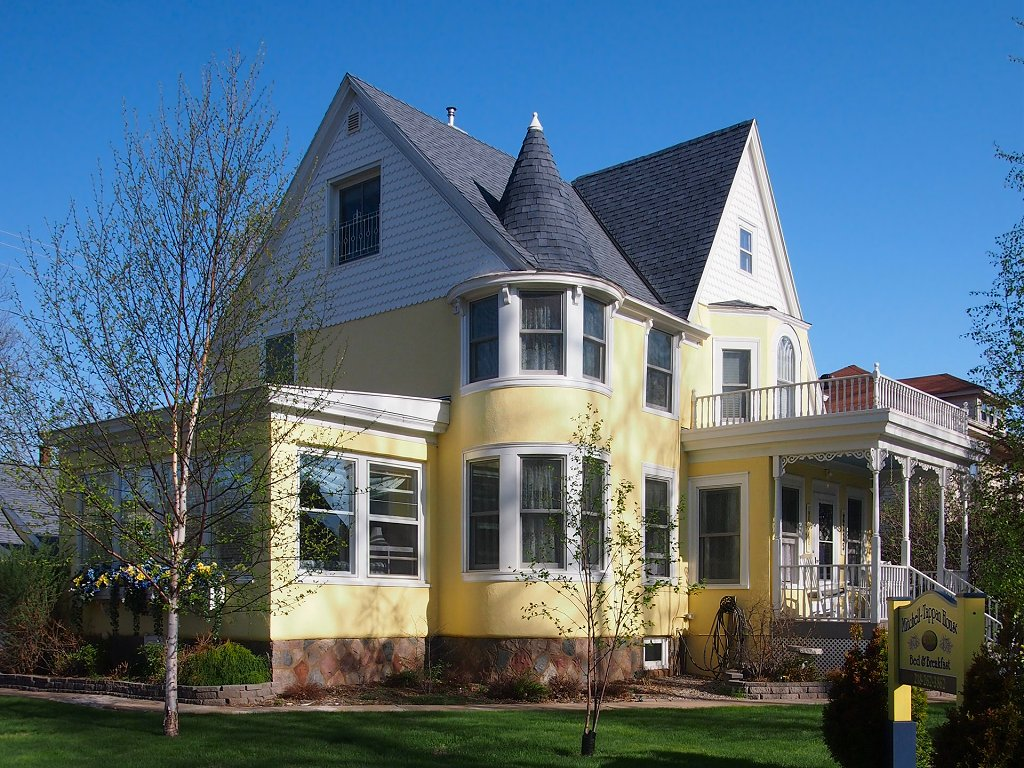
- The Mitchell-Tappan House viewed from the southeast

- Location within Minnesota Location within the United States
- Interactive map showing the location of Mitchell-Tappan House
- Location: 2145 4th Avenue, Hibbing, Minnesota
- Coordinates: 47°25′30.5″N 92°56′17.5″W
- Area: Less than one acre
- Built: 1897
- Architectural style: Queen Anne
- NRHP reference No.: 80004352
- Added to NRHP: December 2, 1980

The Mitchell–Tappan House is a historic house in Hibbing, Minnesota, United States. It was built in 1897 as a residence for executives of the Oliver Mining Company. The house was listed on the National Register of Historic Places in 1980 for its local significance in the themes of architecture and social history. It was nominated for reflecting the sumptuous lifestyle enjoyed by an elite few in the early mining era.

The Oliver Mining Company continued to use the Mitchell–Tappan House as an executive residence into the 1960s. In recent years its owners operated it as a bed and breakfast.

== See also ==
- National Register of Historic Places listings in St. Louis County, Minnesota
