= Bergetta Moe Bakery =

- U.S. National Register of Historic Places
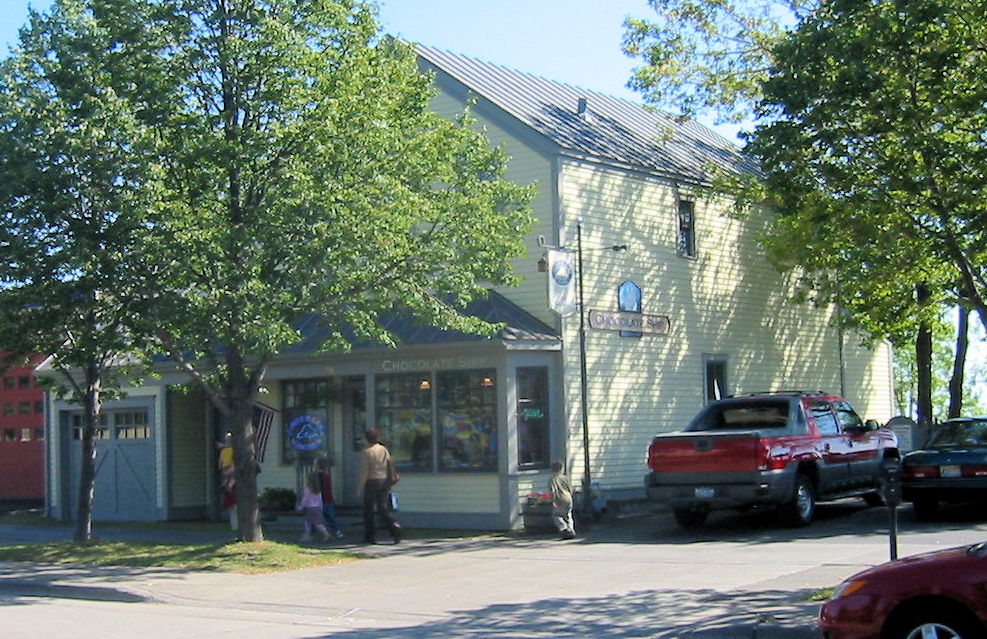
- The Bergetta Moe Bakery viewed from the west

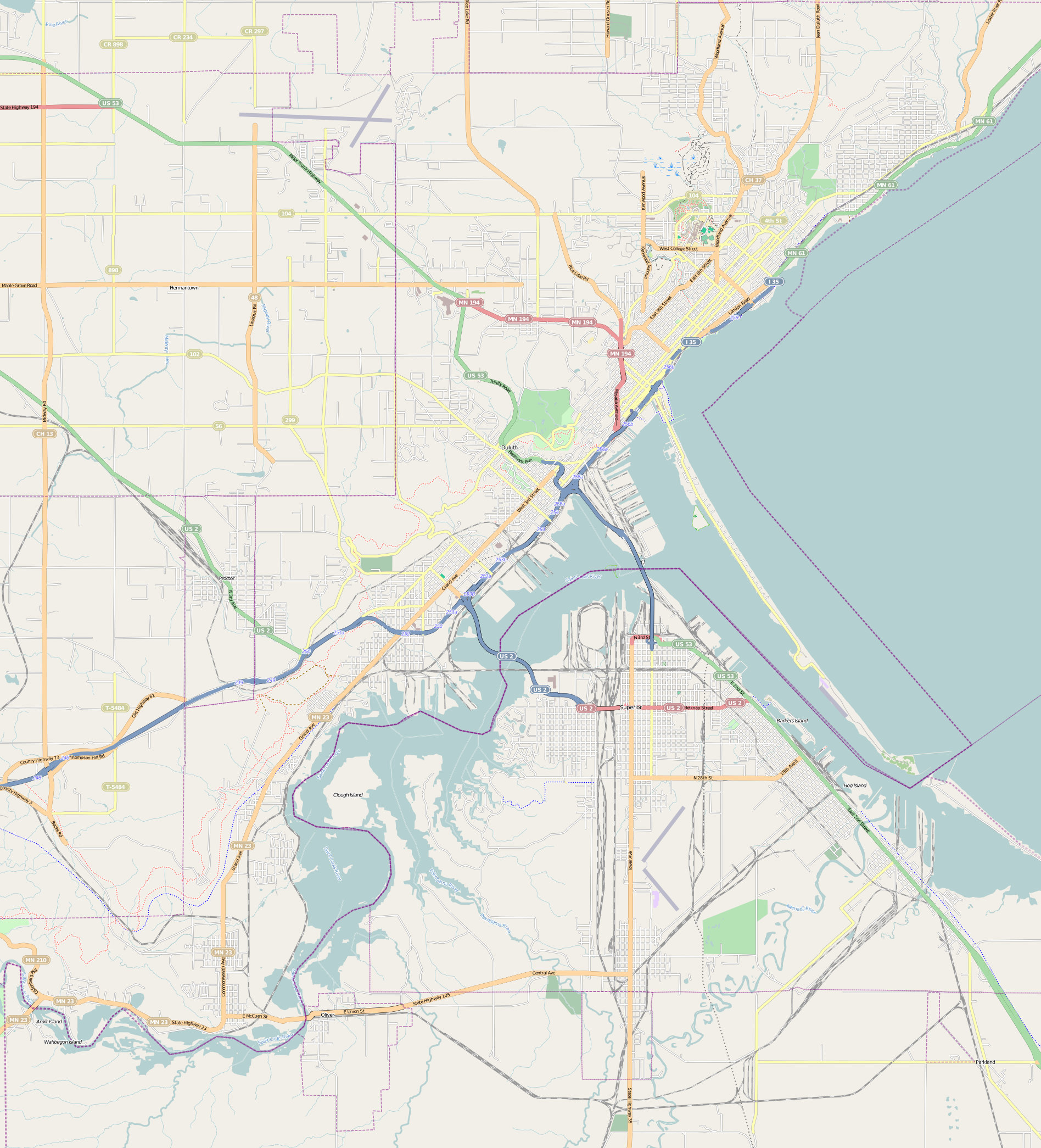
- Location within Duluth Location within Minnesota Location within the United States
- Location: 716 E. Superior Street, Duluth, Minnesota
- Coordinates: 46°47′36.5″N 92°5′22″W
- Area: Less than one acre
- Built: c. 1875
- NRHP reference No.: 76002175
- Added to NRHP: June 3, 1976

The Bergetta Moe Bakery is a historic commercial building in Duluth, Minnesota, United States. Constructed around 1875, it is one of Duluth's oldest standing buildings. It was listed on the National Register of Historic Places in 1976 for its local significance in the theme of architecture. It was nominated for exemplifying the simple wood-frame, gabled style that characterized Duluth's first-generation architecture.

== See also ==
- National Register of Historic Places listings in St. Louis County, Minnesota
