= Buhl Public Library =

Public library in Minnesota

- U.S. National Register of Historic Places
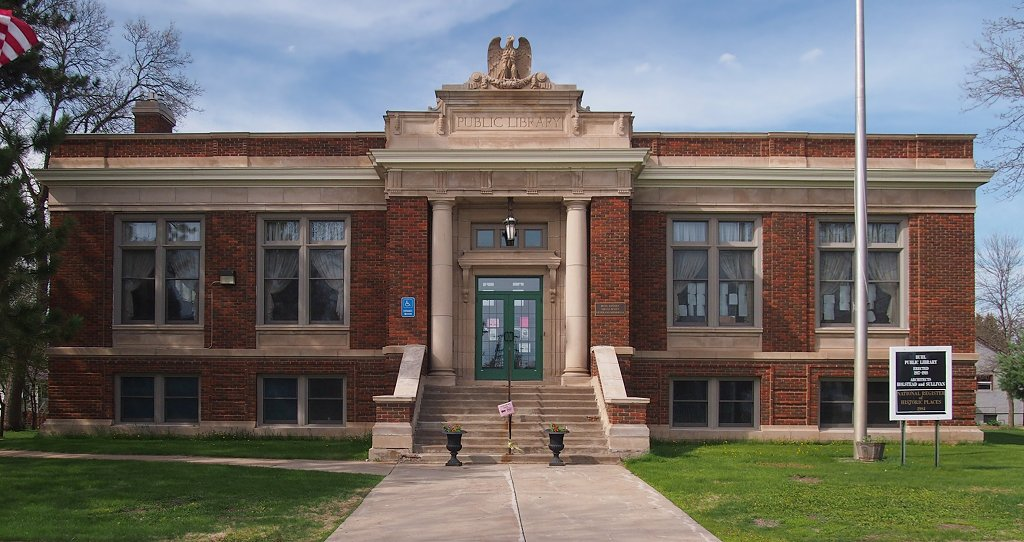
- Buhl Public Library from the south-southwest

- Location within Minnesota Location within the United States
- Location: 400 Jones Avenue, Buhl, Minnesota
- Coordinates: 47°29′45″N 92°46′34″W
- Area: Less than one acre
- Built: 1917–18
- Built by: Hugh Faucet
- Architect: Holstead & Sullivan
- NRHP reference No.: 83004605
- Added to NRHP: February 10, 1983

Buhl Public Library is the public library serving Buhl, Minnesota, United States. Its building was constructed from 1917 to 1918 with local tax revenue from a mining boom. It was listed on the National Register of Historic Places in 1983 for its local significance in the themes of architecture and education. It was nominated for symbolizing how a company town used local funds to serve the educational and cultural needs of its multi-ethnic populace.

== See also ==
- National Register of Historic Places listings in St. Louis County, Minnesota
