= First National Bank of Gilbert =

- U.S. National Register of Historic Places
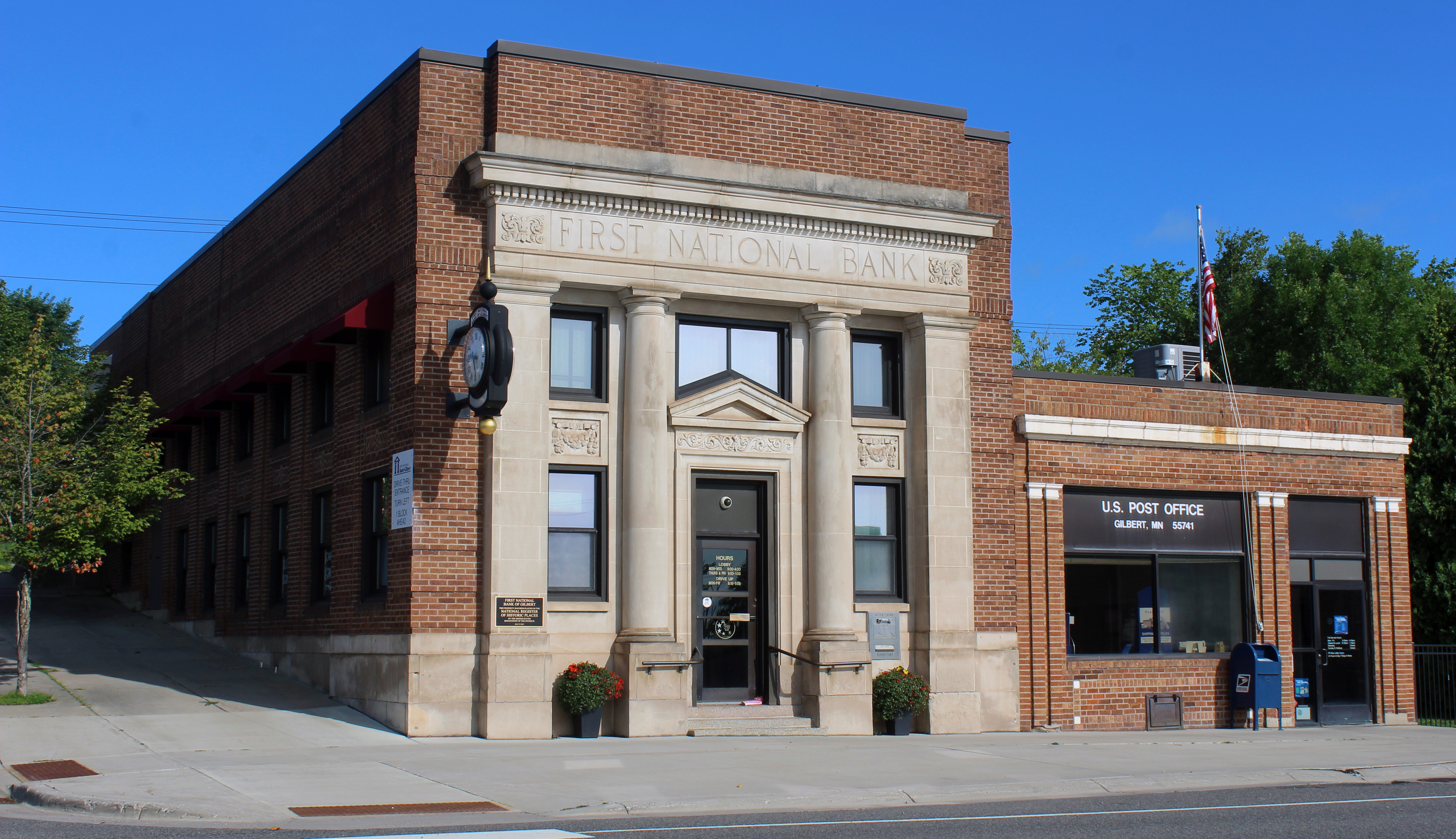
- The First National Bank of Gilbert from the southeast

- Location within Minnesota Location within the United States
- Location: 2 N. Broadway, Gilbert, Minnesota
- Coordinates: 47°29′15.1″N 92°28′0″W
- Area: Less than one acre
- Built: 1920
- Architect: A. Moorman & Company, Architectural Resources
- Architectural style: Neoclassical
- NRHP reference No.: 12000415
- Added to NRHP: July 17, 2012

The First National Bank of Gilbert is a historic bank building in Gilbert, Minnesota, United States. It was constructed in 1920. It was listed on the National Register of Historic Places in 2012 for its local significance in the themes of architecture and commerce. It was nominated for its prominent Neoclassical architecture and for the financial support it gave to the area's agricultural sector. Located in a region better known for its mining industry, the First National Bank of Gilbert distinguished itself by providing capital to farmers and sponsoring agricultural societies.

== See also ==
- National Register of Historic Places listings in St. Louis County, Minnesota
