= W. Bailey House =

House in Eveleth, Minnesota

- U.S. National Register of Historic Places
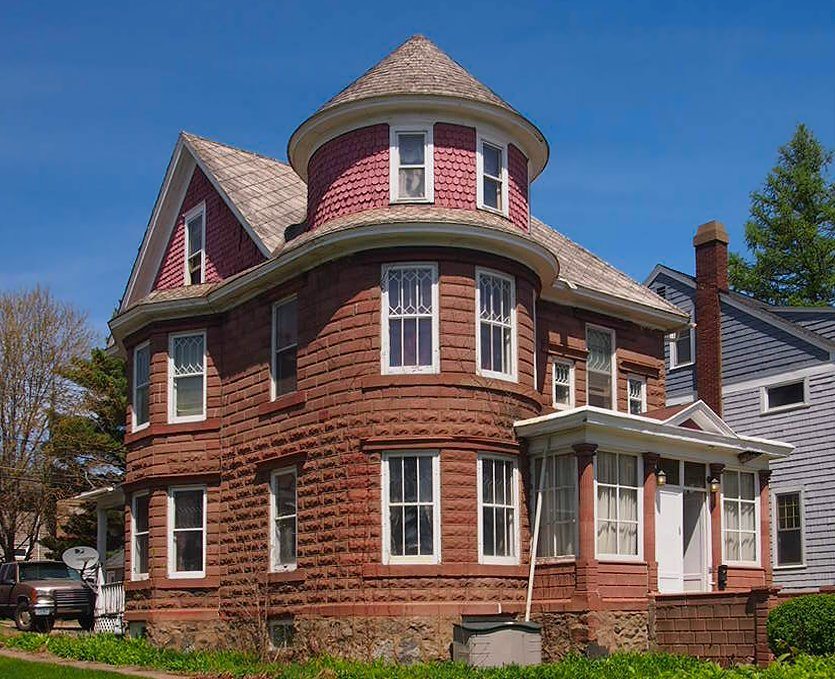
- The W. Bailey House viewed from the southwest

- Location within Minnesota Location within the United States
- Location: 705 Pierce Street, Eveleth, Minnesota
- Coordinates: 47°27′46.8″N 92°32′4.3″W
- Area: Less than one acre
- Built: 1905
- Architectural style: Queen Anne
- NRHP reference No.: 80004347
- Added to NRHP: August 27, 1980

The W. Bailey House, also known as the Redstone Building, is a historic house in Eveleth, Minnesota, United States. It was built 1905 using rusticated, rose-dyed concrete brick with matching stone trim. The house was listed on the National Register of Historic Places in 1980 for its local significance in the theme of architecture. It was nominated for being Eveleth's leading example of Queen Anne architecture.

== See also ==
- National Register of Historic Places listings in St. Louis County, Minnesota
