= Lincoln School Building =

- U.S. National Register of Historic Places
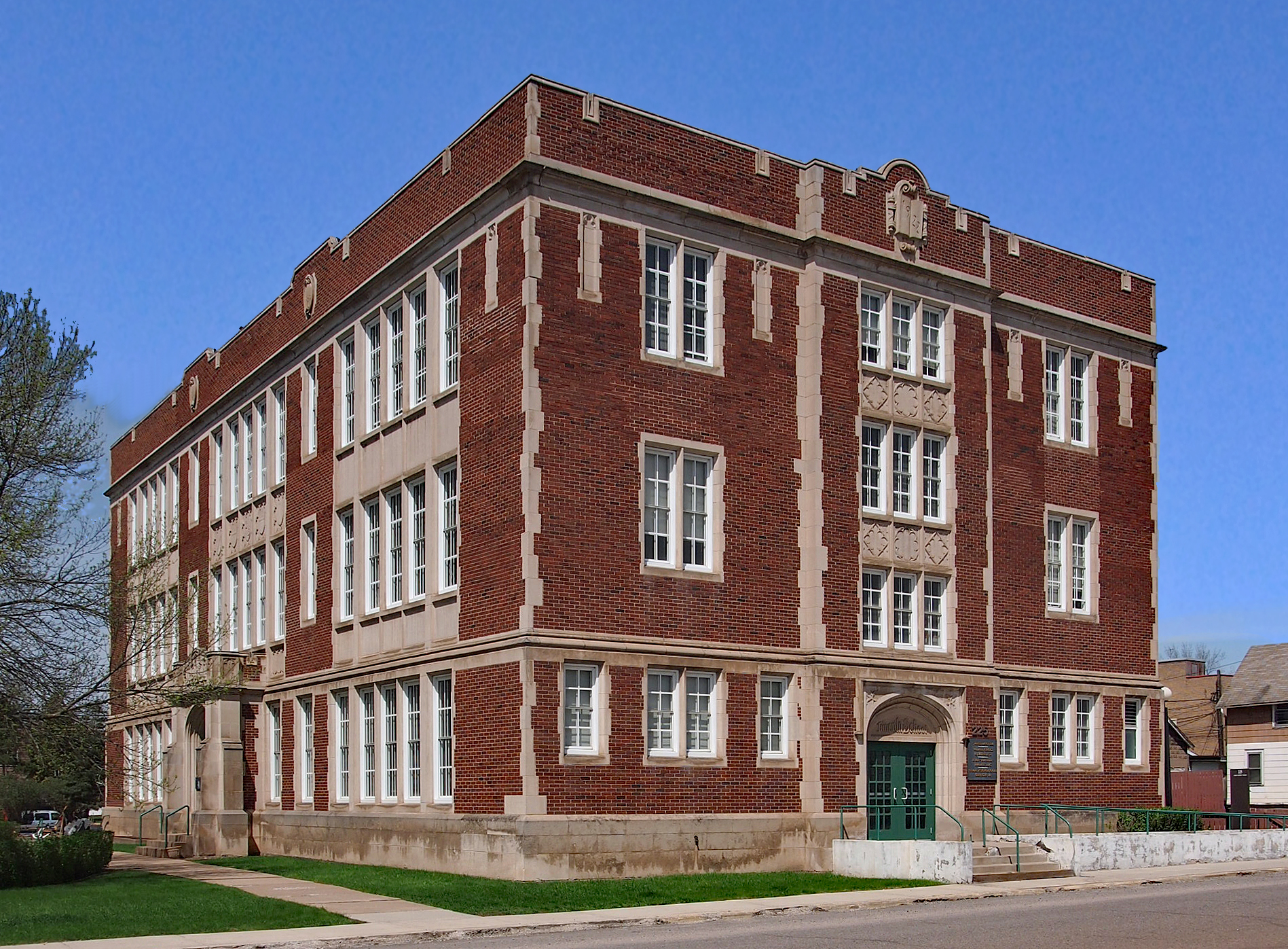
- The Lincoln School Building from the southwest

- Location within Minnesota Location within the United States
- Location: 225 1st Street N., Virginia, Minnesota
- Coordinates: 47°31′27.5″N 92°32′4″W
- Area: 1 acre (0.40 ha)
- Built: 1922
- Architect: Kelley & Shefchin
- Architectural style: Jacobean Revival
- NRHP reference No.: 78003130
- Added to NRHP: November 28, 1978

The Lincoln School Building is a former school building in Virginia, Minnesota, United States. It was built in 1922 in the Jacobean Revival style, which was popular nationwide for educational facilities in the early 20th century. In 1978 it listed on the National Register of Historic Places for its local significance in the theme of architecture. It was nominated for being the city's only remaining school building to embody this emblematic early-20th-century architectural style with virtually no later alterations.

== See also ==
- National Register of Historic Places listings in St. Louis County, Minnesota
