= LaSalle Apartments =

- U.S. National Register of Historic Places
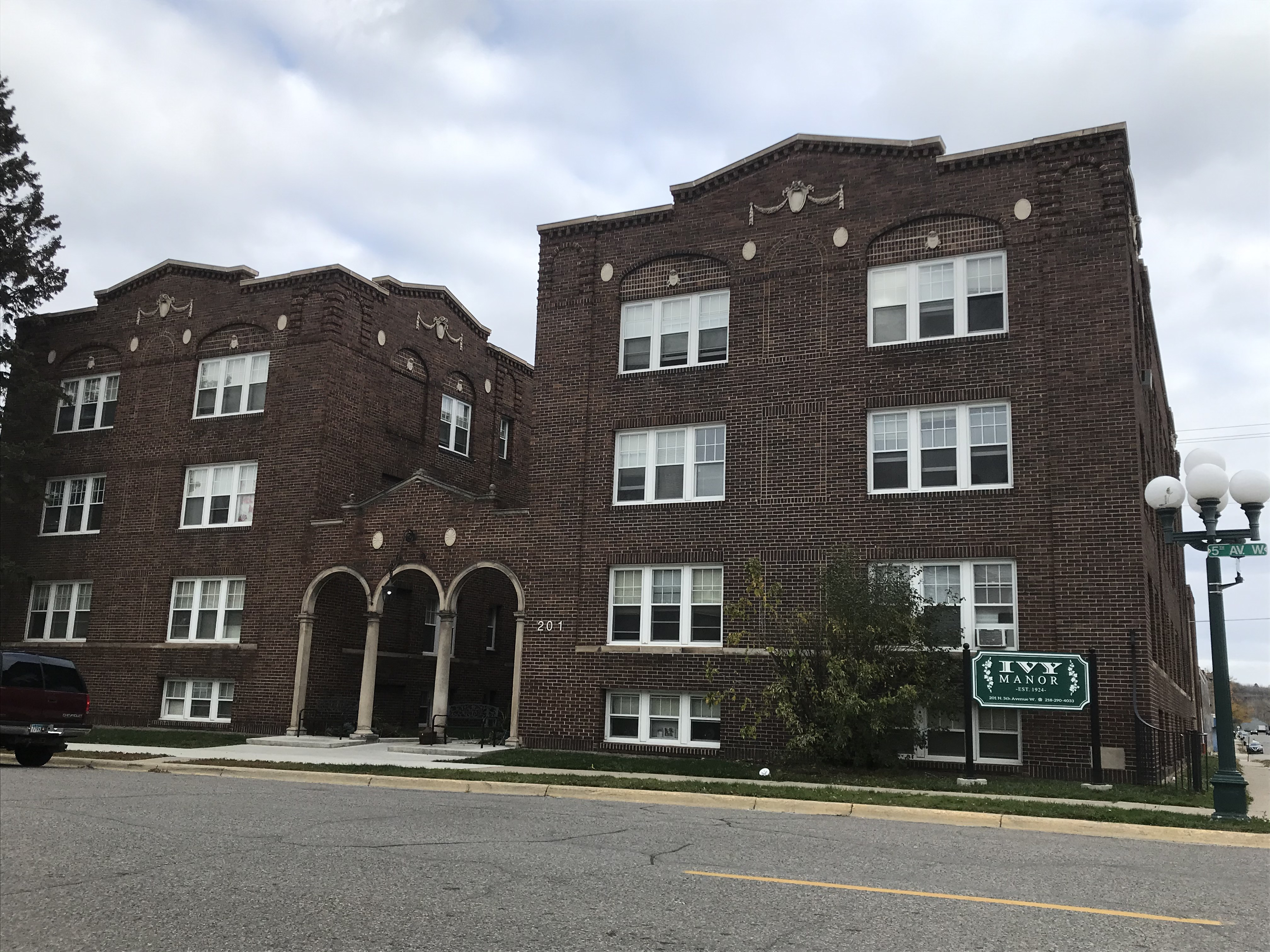

- Location within Minnesota Location within the United States
- Location: 201 N 5th Avenue, Virginia, Minnesota
- Coordinates: 47°31′27.5″N 92°32′18″W
- Built: 1924
- Built by: DeZurick-Cutlow Company
- Architectural style: Georgian Revival
- NRHP reference No.: 100001845
- Added to NRHP: November 27, 2017

The LaSalle Apartments, also called Ivy Manor, is a historic apartment building in Virginia, Minnesota, United States. It was built in 1924. In 2017 it was listed on the National Register of Historic Places for its local significance in the theme of community planning and development. It was nominated for exemplifying the emergence of multi-unit housing for middle-class urbanites in the early 20th century.

== See also ==
- National Register of Historic Places listings in St. Louis County, Minnesota
