= Irving School (Duluth, Minnesota) =

- U.S. National Register of Historic Places
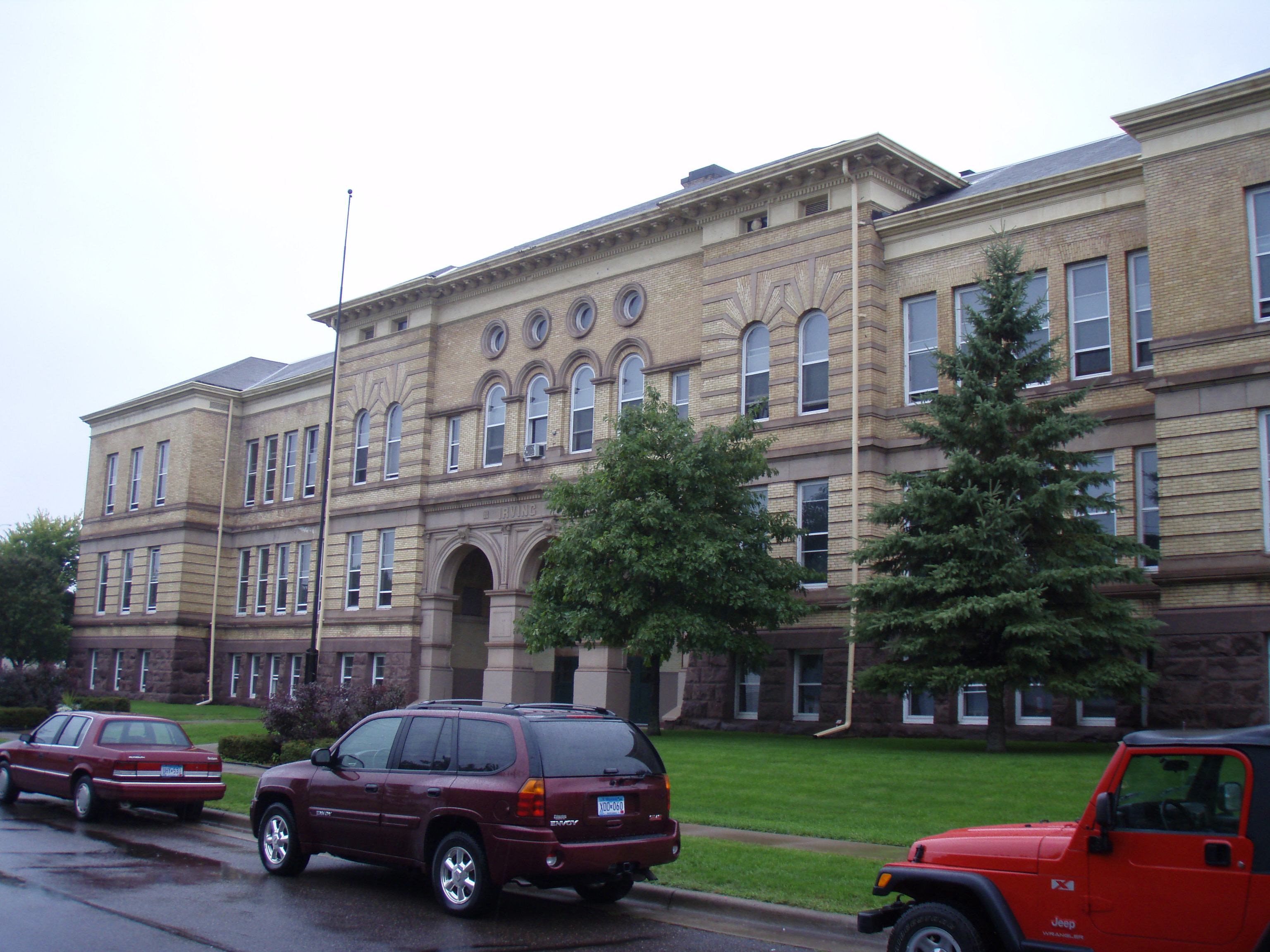
- Irving School from the southeast

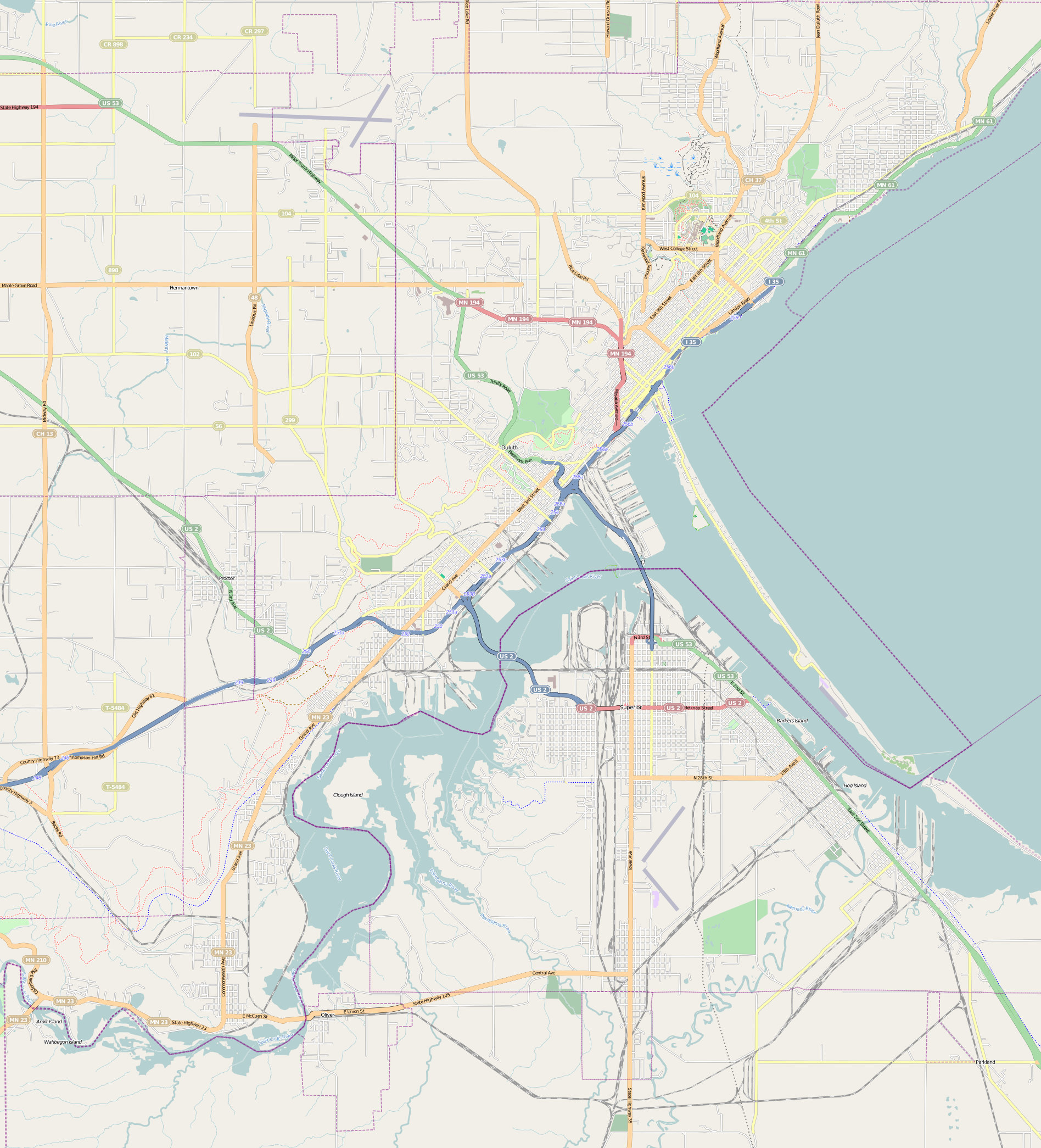
- Location within Duluth Location within Minnesota Location within the United States
- Location: 101 N. 56th Avenue W., Duluth, Minnesota
- Coordinates: 46°44′8″N 92°10′7″W
- Area: 1.5 acres (0.61 ha)
- Built: 1895
- Architect: Palmer, Hall, & Hunt
- Architectural style: Renaissance Revival
- NRHP reference No.: 92001611
- Added to NRHP: November 20, 1992

Irving School is a former school building in Duluth, Minnesota, United States. It operated as a school from its construction in 1895 until 1982, when it was closed due to declining enrollment. Upon closing it underwent adaptive reuse as an apartment building. In 1992 the Irving School was listed on the National Register of Historic Places for its local significance in the themes of architecture and education. It was nominated for its early Renaissance Revival design by Palmer, Hall, & Hunt and for its association with the expansion and evolution of the Duluth school system.

== See also ==
- National Register of Historic Places listings in St. Louis County, Minnesota
