= Minnesota Point Light =

Historic lighthouse ruin in Minnesota, United States

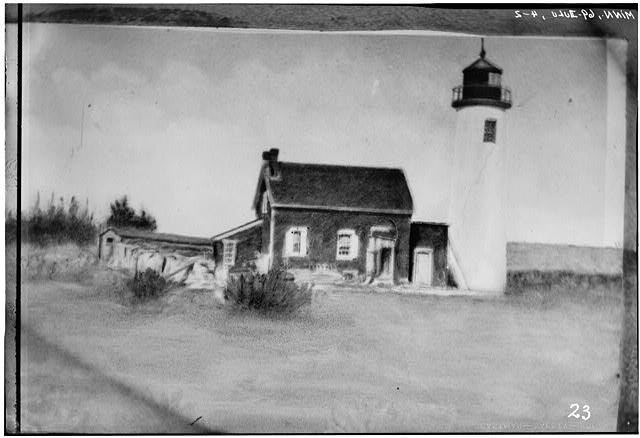
- The Minnesota Point Light sometime before 1893
- Location: Minnesota Point, Duluth, Minnesota
- Coordinates: 46°42′36.1″N 92°1′33.1″W

Tower
- Foundation: Stone
- Construction: Brick
- Height: 50 ft (15 m)
- Shape: Conical tower
- Markings: White
- Heritage: National Register of Historic Places listed place

Light
- First lit: 1858
- Deactivated: 1913
- Lens: Fifth order Fresnel lens
- Minnesota Point Lighthouse
- U.S. National Register of Historic Places
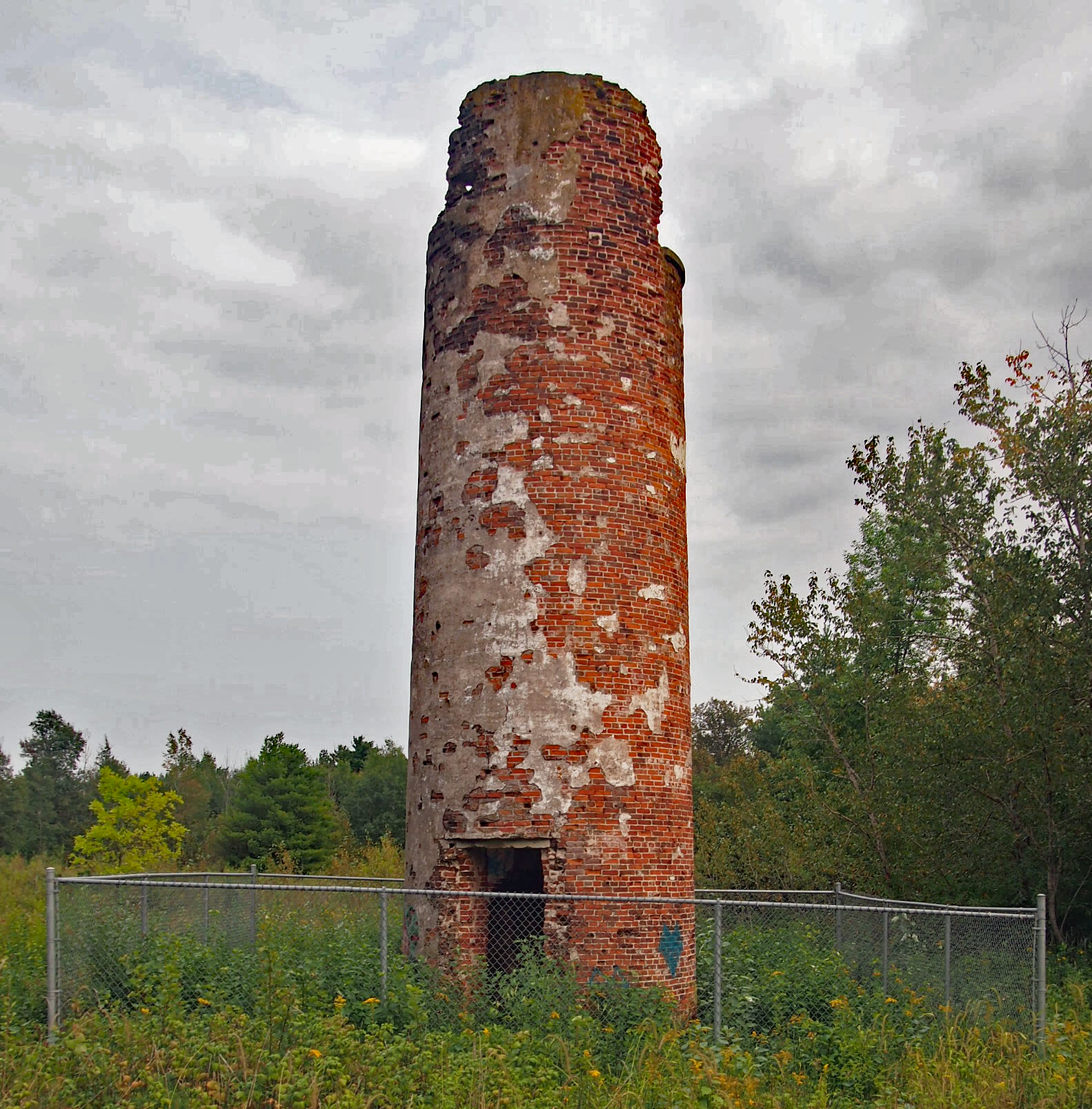
- Minnesota Point Lighthouse in its present ruined state
- Area: .5 acres (0.20 ha)
- NRHP reference No.: 74002206
- Added to NRHP: December 27, 1974

The Minnesota Point Light was a historic lighthouse on Minnesota Point in Duluth, Minnesota, United States, on the shores of Lake Superior. Built in 1858, it was the first lighthouse in the state, but is now a truncated ruined tower. The ruin was listed on the National Register of Historic Places in 1974 for its state-level significance in the theme of transportation. It was nominated for being the first high-powered lighthouse on Lake Superior, and the zero-point for all original surveys of the lake.

== History ==
The first survey of Lake Superior was undertaken in 1823 by Henry W. Bayfield of the British Navy, who chose a spot on Minnesota Point as the zero point of his mapping. The point is the eastern end of a great sand bar separating Superior Bay from the lake; the passage to the east of the point (known as Superior Entry) was the original outlet of the Saint Louis River. The Saint Louis River, which rises in Minnesota, becomes the Saint Louis Bay, then flows into Superior Bay and exits into Lake Superior via the ship canals, at each end of Minnesota Point (Park Point). Both Superior, Wisconsin, and Duluth, Minnesota, sprang up on opposite banks of the river and bay to take advantage of the excellent natural harbor; thus plans for a lighthouse to mark the entrance preceded Minnesota statehood, and appropriation was made by Congress in 1855. Due to delays from the cold winters, the light was not lit until spring of 1858.

The spot chosen for the tower was Bayfield's zero point; a circular tower forty feet high and twelve feet in diameter was constructed of red brick brought in from Cleveland and coated with white mortar. This was topped with a wooden cupola, shingled except for windows on the lake side for the beacon. A 1 1/2-story dwelling of the same brick was built alongside the tower, topped with a slate roof. A fifth order Fresnel lens was installed, giving a fixed red indication.

Construction of the dwelling was apparently substandard, as an 1868 report complained of leaks and fallen plaster. In any case, the station was to be relatively short-lived. In the same year, construction began on the first piers built to protect the Superior Entry inlet, and in 1871 a new channel was cut at the opposite end of the sand bar to allow direct entry into Duluth harbor. All of these required additional navigational aids. In 1878 a light was placed on the north pier of the Superior Entry, and the Minnesota Point Light was extinguished; this proved to be temporary, however, and it was re-lit in 1880. A new pierhead light was constructed in 1885, and the old light was again extinguished, this time for good. The dwelling continued in use as housing for the keepers of the north pierhead light, but in 1893 this light was transferred to the south pier (succeeded by the present Wisconsin Point Light in 1913). This necessitated a new keeper's house on the other side of the inlet as well, and the old dwelling was abandoned, eventually completely disappearing. The tower continues to stand, its lantern gone and the brickwork truncated, the mortar gradually disappearing from the brickwork. A buoy depot was built on the grounds in 1903, but it too has been abandoned.

The remains of the tower were put on the National Register of Historic Places in 1974.

== See also ==
- List of lighthouses in Minnesota
- National Register of Historic Places listings in St. Louis County, Minnesota
