= List of lighthouses in Minnesota =

This is a list of all lighthouses in the U.S. state of Minnesota as identified by the United States Coast Guard. There are five active lights in the state; one light is inactive but has been converted to a museum, and one is in ruins.

The first lighthouse in the state was erected in 1858 and the last in 1922 (ignoring automated towers erected later); the oldest active light is the Two Harbors Light.

If not otherwise noted, focal height and coordinates are taken from the United States Coast Guard Light List, while location and dates of activation, automation, and deactivation are taken from the United States Coast Guard Historical information site for lighthouses.

Name	Image	Location	Coordinates	Year first lit	Automated	Year deactivated	Current Lens	Focal Height
Duluth North Pier Light		Duluth	46.7810°N 92.0881°W	1910	Unknown	Active	LED	46 ft (14 m)
Duluth South Breakwater; Inner Light		Duluth	46.7788°N 92.0918°W	1889 (Former); 1901 (Current)	1976	Active	LED	68 ft (21 m)
Duluth South Breakwater; Outer Light		Duluth	46.7801°N 92.0875°W	1874 (Former); 1901 (Current)	1976	Active	LED	44 ft (13 m)
Grand Marais Light		Grand Marais	47.7452°N 90.3379°W	1885 (Former); 1922 (Current)	1937	Active	LED	48 ft (15 m)
Minnesota Point Light		Duluth	46.7100°N 92.0259°W	1858	Never	1913 (Now in ruins)	None	Unknown
Split Rock Lighthouse		Beaver Bay Township	47.1999°N 91.3671°W	1910	Never	1969 (Now a museum)	Third-order Fresnel	168 ft (51 m)
Two Harbors Light		Two Harbors	47.0140°N 91.6635°W	1892	1980	Active (Also a museum)	DCB-224	78 ft (24 m)
Two Harbors Breakwater Light	Two Harbors Breakwater Light	Two Harbors	47.0106°N 91.6695°W	1906	Unknown	Active (Inactive: 1947–1950)	LED	33.5 ft (10.2 m)
