= Nemadji Golf Course =

Golf course in Wisconsin

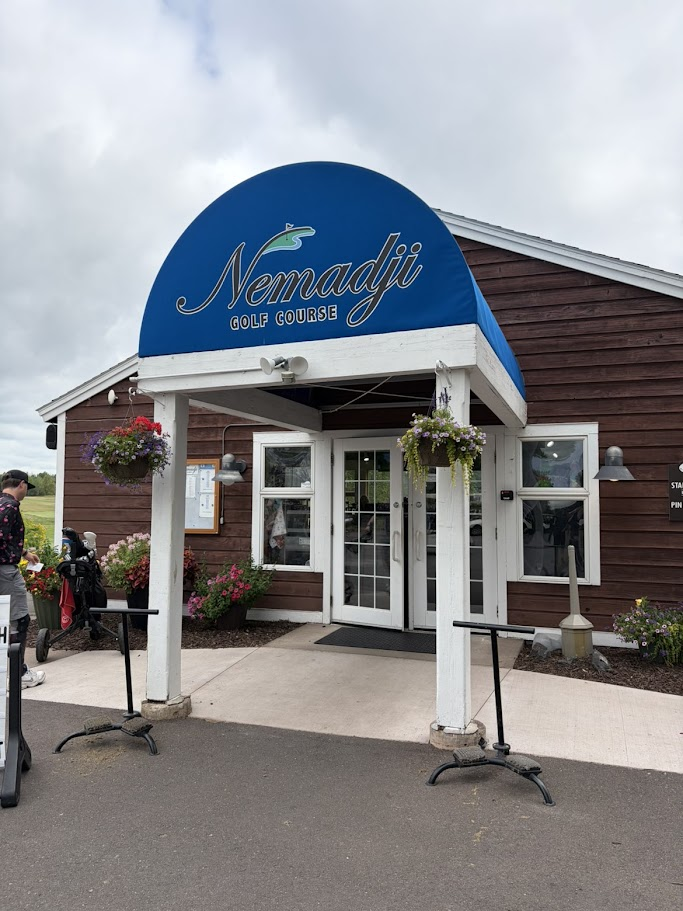
- Entrance to the Pro Shop at Nemadji Golf Course
- Interactive map of Nemadji Golf Course
- 46.673°N 92.075°W

Club information
- Location: 5 N 58th St, Superior, WI 54880, United States
- Established: 1932
- Type: Public
- Total holes: 36
- Tournaments: University of Wisconsin–Superior Spring Invitational (NCAA Division 3)
- Website: Official website

North/South Course
- Designed by: Stanley Pelchar
- Par: 71
- Length: 6,180 yards (5,650 m)
- Course rating: 69.9
- Slope rating: 118
- Course record: 62 (Nick Moore)

East/West Course
- Designed by: Don Hertfort (West 9) and Roger Packard (East 9)
- Par: 72
- Length: 6,571 yards (6,009 m)
- Course rating: 71.9
- Slope rating: 130
- Course record: 64 (Olle Sedelius)

Nemadji Golf Course is a 36-hole golf facility located in Superior, Wisconsin. It serves as the home course for the University of Wisconsin-Superior Yellowjacket golf teams, who participate in the Upper Midwest Athletic Conference at the NCAA Division III level. The golf course is also the home to the Superior Spartans who participate as a member of the Wisconsin Interscholastic Athletic Association. The course is owned by the City of Superior and today features 36 holes, a driving range, practice greens, and a par-3 practice course.

== History ==
Nemadji was designed by Stanley Pelchar in 1932 and later expanded through the contributions of Don Herfort in 1984 and Roger Packard in 1991. The golf course received some early acclaim when it was played by two time Masters tournament champion Horton Smith. Smith came to the course for a showcase of golf skills with fellow professionals Lawson Little, Harry Cooper, and Jimmy Thomson.

Today, the golf course has become known for its quality and accessibility to the average golfer. The Duluth News Tribune has awarded Nemadji as its Best of the Best award 6 years running from 2021 to 2026. Nemadji also received the 2024 Outstanding Business of the Year award from the Superior Chamber of Commerce. Golf Course Superintendent, Brian Wallin, has been on the grounds crew at Nemadji for over 15 years and is a certified member of the Golf Course Superintendents Association of America.

A survey of led by independent consultants of the ten public golf courses in the Twin Ports area ranked Nemadji No. 1 in six out of seven categories including best golf course, best clubhouse, best golf shop, best value, conditioning and more.

In 2017, The Superior City Council signed off on a recommendation allowing the Superior Police Department to kill problem birds in the city. Nemadji was the home to the first major hunt of nuisance waterfowl, geese and pigeons.

In 2018, An explosion and subsequent fire occurred at the Superior Refining Company LLC, which is located next to Nemadji, sharing a border with Holes five and six on the East Nine. No golfers were hurt but air and soil quality where threatened over the subsequent season. One of the plants major piplines flows below the fairways of the Nemadji Golf Course.

Nemadji Golf Course is also the location of water quality monitoring cites along the Nemadji River.

== NCAA Competition ==
Nemadji Golf Course is the location where the University of Wisconsin-Superior Yellowjacket men's and women's golf teams host their yearly matches. It is also the main practice facility for both programs.

Nemadji's East/West course in particular has a reputation as a championship-caliber venue and has hosted competitive golf for many years. The course's size gives UW-Superior a venue capable of accommodating varsity tournaments and large collegiate events in a way that many smaller municipal courses could not. The 36 hole venue also allows the college teams to practice while the city owned course remains accessible to the public.

Additionally, UW-Superior's men's and women's cross country running teams use the facility as well to host their home event annually.

== Events ==
One of the oldest recurring tournaments associated with the course is the Nemadji Women's Invitational. This tournament has been going for 73 years and the event has been one of the Twin Ports' most enduring women's golf competitions

Nemadji has also become a significant venue for junior golf in the Twin Ports. The course hosts the Star of the North Junior Tournament, a youth event that has become one of the facility's signature competitions.

Given Nemadji's status as a premier and accessible golf course of the northwest region of Wisconsin, the Wisconsin State Golf Association routinely uses the venue to host regional qualifiers for statewide events.

== Facilities ==
Nemadji has a standard pro-shop that sells golf gear and a full restaurant called the Greens View Grille. Nemadji has a full practice facility which includes a modern driving range system and large putting and chipping practice area. Additionally, Nemadji also has a free to use three hole par three course as a part of their practice facilities.

== Scorecards ==
=== East/West ===
Tee	Rating/Slope	1	2	3	4	5	6	7	8	9	Out	10	11	12	13	14	15	16	17	18	In	Total
Par		4	5	3	4	4	3	5	4	4	36	4	5	4	5	3	4	4	3	4	36	72
Black	71.9 / 130	399	561	178	312	326	180	548	376	411	3,291	350	506	408	528	205	356	354	173	400	3,280	6,571
Black/White	69.2 / 122	399	561	148	312	301	180	488	330	342	3,061	350	506	357	528	163	356	354	146	334	3,094	6,155
White	M:68.5 / 114 W:73.8 / 126	330	516	148	306	301	153	488	330	342	2,914	325	483	357	490	163	326	327	146	334	2,951	5,865
White/Green	M:65.9 / 109 W:70.9 / 121	319	429	113	306	245	153	488	330	299	2,682	325	416	298	490	122	326	327	92	281	2,677	5,359
Green	M:64.5 / 103 W:68.7 / 118	319	429	113	271	245	122	418	290	299	2,506	273	416	298	410	122	274	278	92	281	2,444	4,950

=== North/South ===
Tee	Rating/Slope	1	2	3	4	5	6	7	8	9	Out	10	11	12	13	14	15	16	17	18	In	Total
Par		4	5	4	4	3	4	4	5	3	36	3	5	3	4	3	5	4	4	4	35	71
Black	69.9 / 118	397	556	396	355	148	352	373	485	123	3,185	161	532	195	393	152	524	374	360	304	2,995	6,180
Black/White	67.6 / 118	349	512	362	355	148	352	363	485	123	3,049	150	532	177	353	152	491	374	332	304	2,865	5,914
White	M:67.6 / 114 W:72.3 / 122	349	512	362	322	131	331	363	474	108	2,952	150	492	177	353	124	491	349	332	296	2,764	5,716
White/Green	M:65.1 / 106 W:69.7 / 118	349	467	289	322	131	284	306	474	108	2,730	124	492	134	353	124	419	310	332	296	2,584	5,314
Green	M:63.3 / 100 W:67.5 / 113	277	467	289	286	117	284	306	410	93	2,529	124	409	134	304	120	419	310	286	255	2,361	4,890
