= Sky Harbor Airport & Seaplane Base =

Airport in Duluth, Minnesota

Sky Harbor Airport Sky Harbor Airport & Seaplane Base
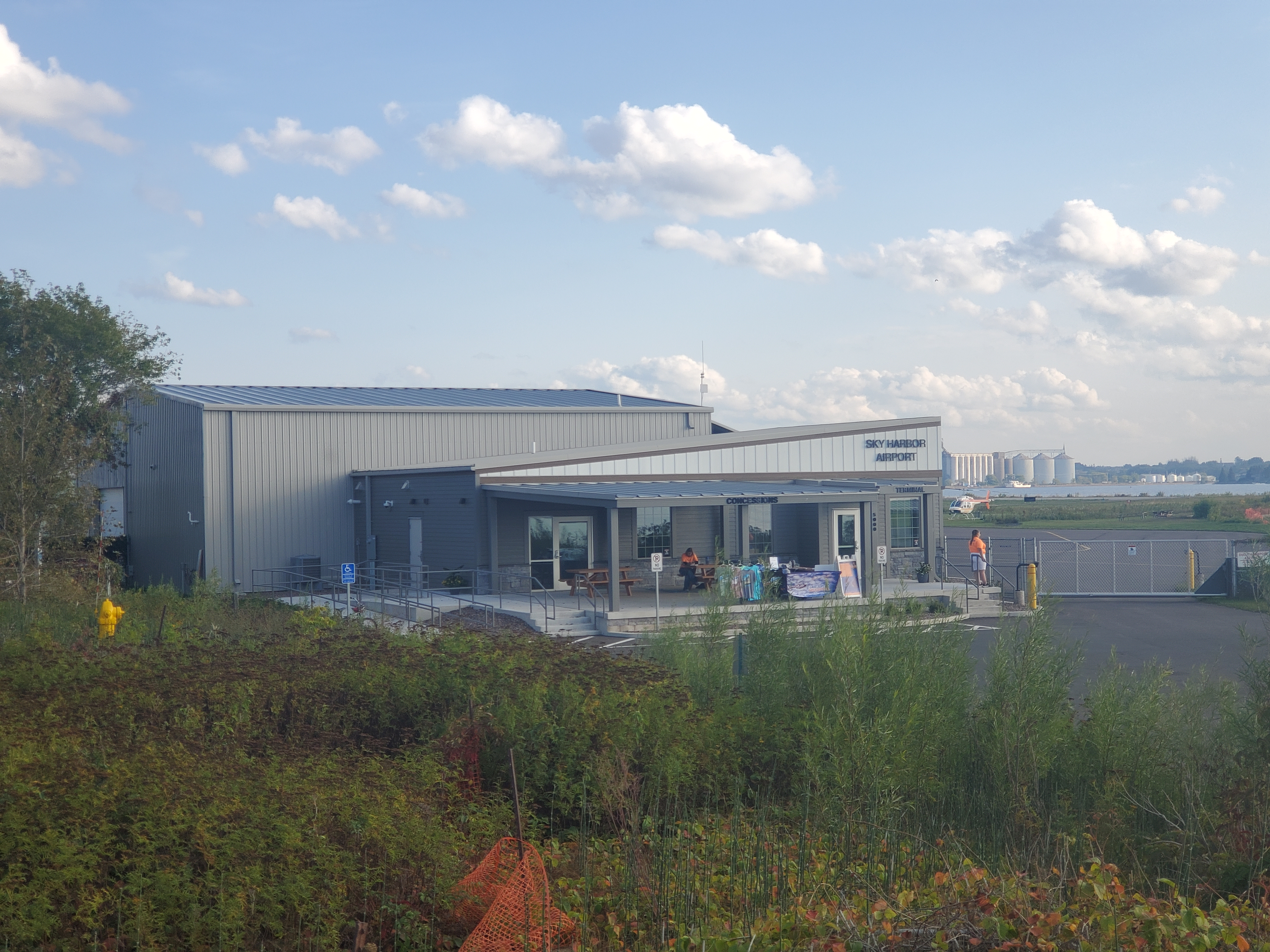
- IATA: none; ICAO: KDYT; FAA LID: DYT

Summary
- Airport type: Public
- Owner: Duluth Airport Authority
- Serves: Duluth, Minnesota
- Opened: 1939
- Elevation AMSL: 610 ft (190 m)
- Coordinates: 46°43′19″N 092°02′36″W
- Website: www.duluthairport.com/...

Map
- Location of airport in Minnesota/United States DYT (the United States)

Runways
Direction	Length		Surface
Direction	ft	m	Surface
14/32	2,600	792.5	Asphalt
13W/31W	5,000	1,524	Water
9W/27W	10,000	3,048	Water

Statistics
- Aircraft operations (2006): 13,900
- Based aircraft (2016): 26
- Sources: Minnesota DOT, FAA, Airport website

Sky Harbor Airport & Seaplane Base or Sky Harbor Airport (ICAO: KDYT, FAA LID: DYT) is a public airport in Duluth, Minnesota, United States. It is located near the Wisconsin border, between Superior Bay and Lake Superior. The airport is six nautical miles (11 km) southeast of the central business district of Duluth, Minnesota, on Minnesota Point within its city limits.

The airport is owned by the Duluth Airport Authority and has been operating since 1939. It is one of only four airports in Minnesota offering both a hard surface runway for airplanes and water landing areas for seaplanes.

Although most U.S. airports use the same three-letter location identifier for the FAA and IATA, Sky Harbor Airport is assigned DYT by the FAA but has no designation from the IATA.

== Facilities and aircraft ==
Sky Harbor Airport covers an area of 70 acres (28 ha) which contains one asphalt paved runway, designated 14/32, measuring 2,600 by 75 feet (793 x 23 m). It also has two seaplane landing areas: 9W/27W is 5,000 by 1,500 feet (1,524 x 457 m) and 13W/31W is 10,000 by 2,000 feet (3,048 x 610 m).

Protecting old-growth pine trees on the south east end of the runway prompted a $13.2 million project to realign the runway by 5 degrees and change the runway length to 2600 feet with no displaced thresholds. The airport reopened with its newly resurfaced runway on June 12, 2020. The runway realignment created seven acres of new land for the southeast end of the runway along the edge of Park Point, in order to angle the runway into the bay rather than toward the forest. The old Runway 32 had a displaced threshold 658 ft past the beginning of the hard surface, leaving 2,392 ft for landing.

For the 12-month period ending April 30, 2018, the airport had 13,900 aircraft operations, an average of 38 per day: 94% general aviation and 6% air taxi. In 2018, there were 24 aircraft based at this airport: 21 single-engine and 3 multi-engine.

== History ==
Sky Harbor Airport was founded in 1946 by Jack Brockway and William Neukom.

== See also ==
- List of airports in Minnesota
