= Duluth Harbor North Pier Light =

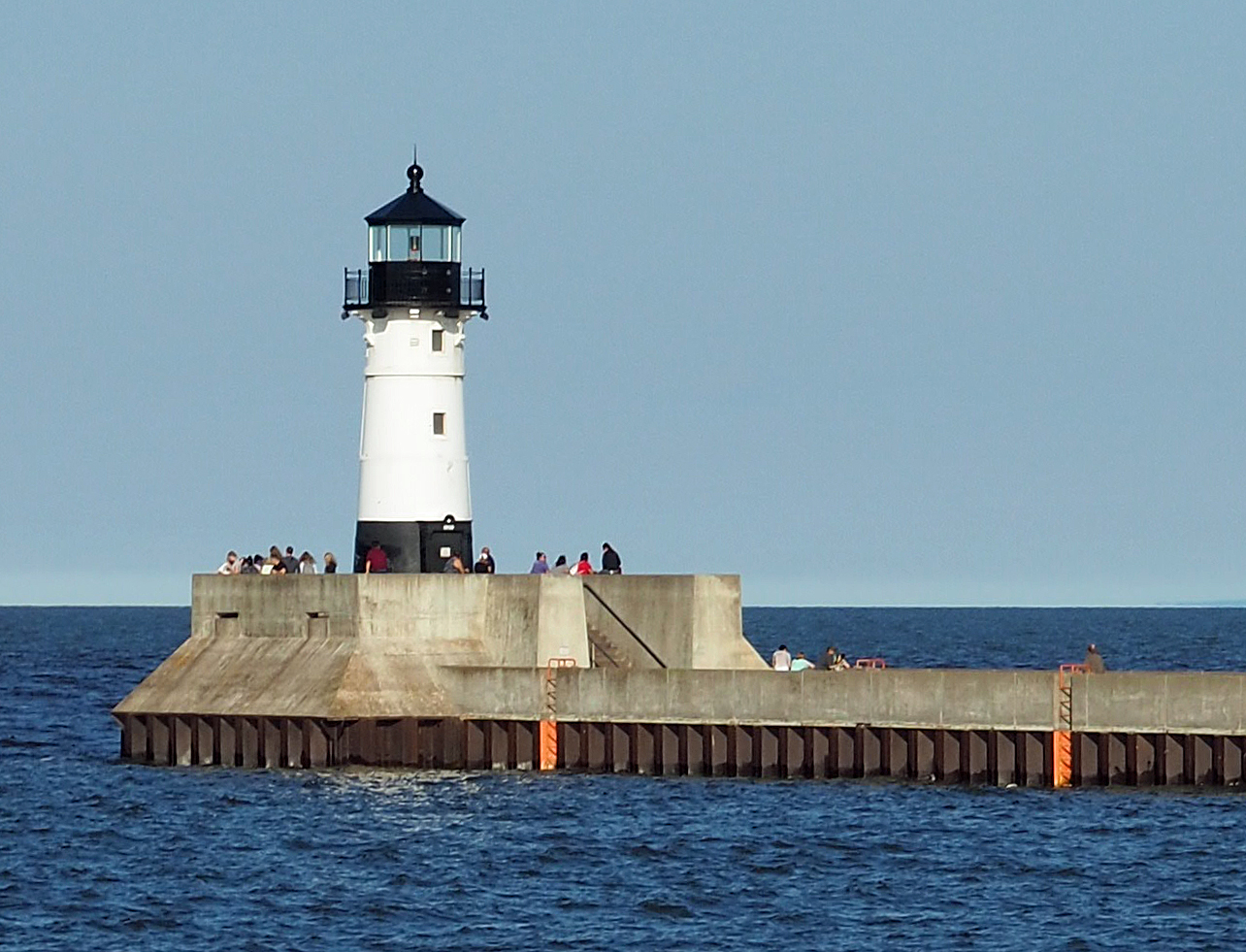
- Duluth Harbor North Pier Light from the west
- Location: End of north pier of the Duluth Ship Canal, Duluth, Minnesota
- Coordinates: 46°46′51.4″N 92°5′17.8″W

Tower
- Constructed: 1910
- Foundation: Concrete breakwater
- Construction: Steel/cast iron
- Height: 36 ft (11 m)
- Shape: Cylindrical tower
- Markings: White with black lantern
- Heritage: National Register of Historic Places listed place

Light
- First lit: 1910
- Focal height: 43 ft (13 m)
- Lens: Fifth order Fresnel lens
- Range: 11 nautical miles (20 km; 13 mi)
- Characteristic: Red isophase 4s
- Duluth Harbor North Pier Light
- U.S. National Register of Historic Places
- Area: Less than one acre
- Architect: Office of the Superintendent of Lighthouses
- MPS: Light Stations of the United States MPS
- NRHP reference No.: 16000340
- Added to NRHP: June 7, 2016

The Duluth Harbor North Pier Light is a lighthouse on the north breakwater of the Duluth Ship Canal in Duluth, Minnesota, United States.

== History ==
An 1896 project to improve harbor facilities resulted in the reconstruction of the sides of the Duluth Ship Canal, bracketing it in the two concrete piers which define its channel to the present. While the south pier had been equipped with a light from 1874, the north pier was unlit, and given the difficult approach (highlighted by the notorious wreck of the SS Mataafa in 1905), calls for aids were soon made. A 1908 Lighthouse Board report, in recommending the construction of a light on the north pier, noted that a private aid was already being placed on the pier. Appropriation was made in 1909, and a tower was erected and lit the following year. The design was based on that of the Peche Island Rear Range Light, featuring a short round tower built of steel plates. A fifth-order Fresnel lens from France was installed and lit with a 210-candlepower electric lamp powered from the city power grid. All the lights on the canal were maintained by the same keepers; the head keeper lived in a frame house constructed in 1874 with the Duluth South Breakwater Outer Light, while the assistants were given a brick duplex in 1913 after years of having to find boarding accommodations on their own.

The North Pier Light was listed on the National Register of Historic Places in 2016 for its local significance in the themes of engineering, maritime history, and transportation. It was nominated for its association with federal efforts to establish nationwide navigational aids, and for being characteristic of early-20th-century pier and breakwater lights built around the Great Lakes.

In May 2021, the U.S. General Services Administration announced that the Coast Guard no longer needed the lighthouse and it was eligible to be transferred at no cost to another public agency or non-profit in accordance with the National Historic Lighthouse Preservation Act. In February 2022, the lighthouse was awarded to the Minnesota-based nonprofit Rethos, which is in the process of securing ownership of the lighthouse.

== See also ==
- List of lighthouses in Minnesota
- National Register of Historic Places listings in St. Louis County, Minnesota
