= U.S. Army Corps of Engineers Duluth Vessel Yard =

- U.S. National Register of Historic Places
- U.S. Historic district
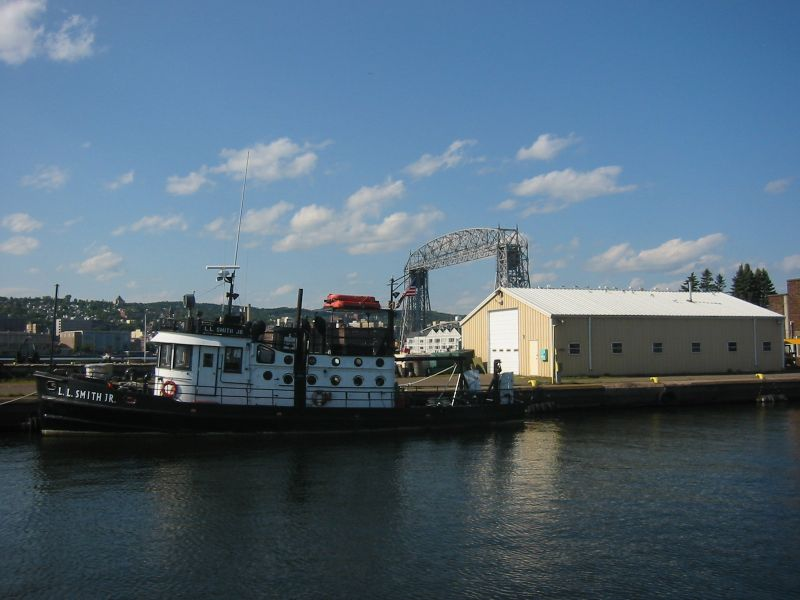
- A tugboat, pier, and support building at the Duluth Vessel Yard

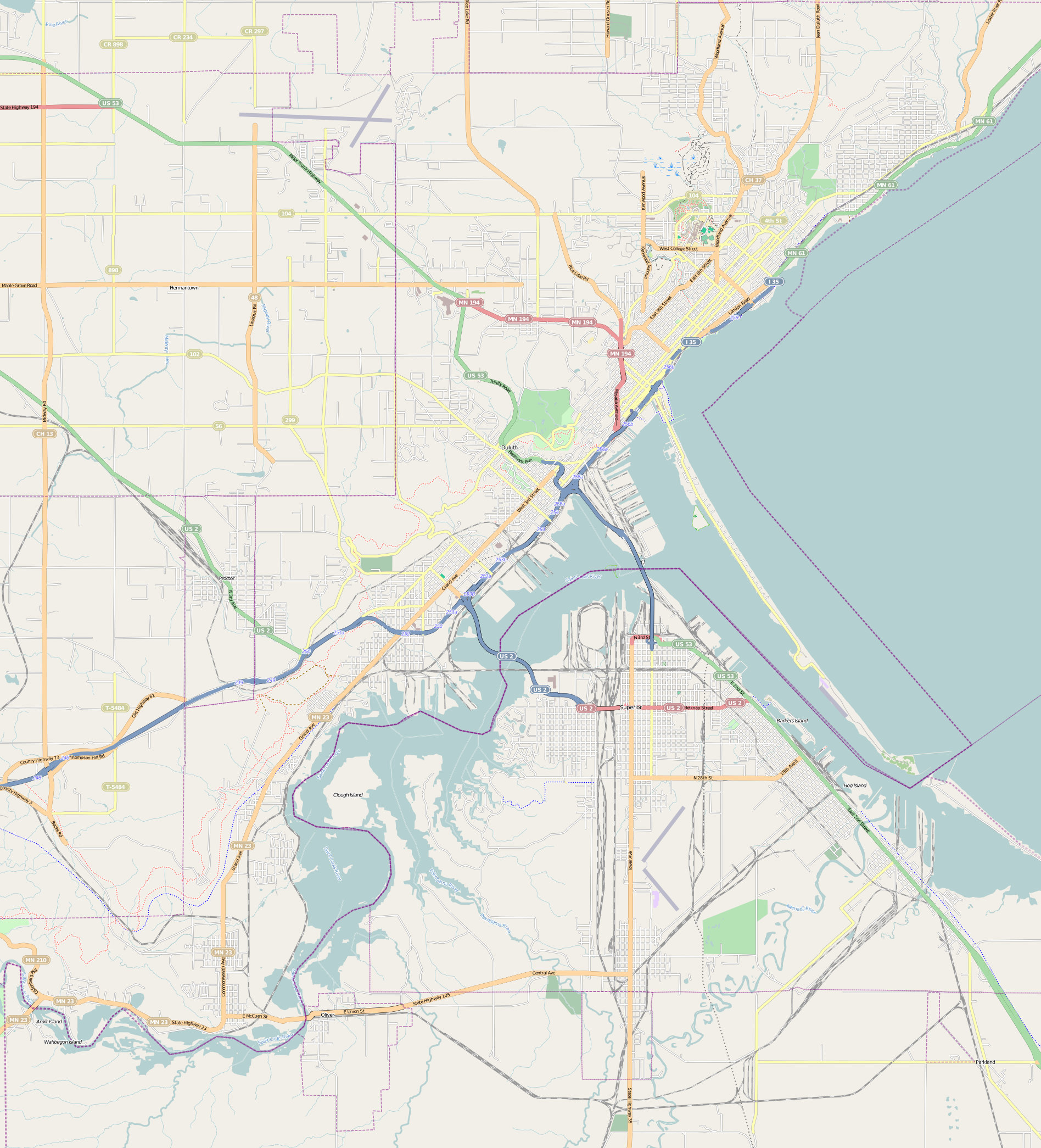
- Location within Duluth Location within Minnesota Location within the United States
- Location: 901 Minnesota Avenue, Duluth, Minnesota
- Coordinates: 46°46′32″N 92°5′34″W
- Area: 2.2 acres (0.89 ha)
- Built: 1926–31, 1940–41, 1948
- Architectural style: Utilitarian
- NRHP reference No.: 95001163
- Added to NRHP: October 23, 1995

The U.S. Army Corps of Engineers Duluth Vessel Yard is a federal port facility in Duluth, Minnesota, United States. It houses the United States Army Corps of Engineers (USACE) resources used to maintain the harbors of the Twin Ports of Duluth and Superior, Wisconsin. It was established on Minnesota Point in 1903, though most of its present configuration dates to a flurry of construction in 1941.

The Duluth Vessel Yard was listed on the National Register of Historic Places in 1995 for its local significance in the themes of community planning and development, conservation, engineering, maritime history, politics/government, and transportation. It was nominated for its significant role in developing and maintaining the harbor that underpins the Twin Ports economy and for encapsulating federal involvement in local transportation infrastructure.

== History ==
After the construction of the St. Mary's Falls Ship Canal was completed at Sault Ste. Marie, ships carrying grain, lumber, coal, and iron ore could carry the natural resources of the Midwestern United States to East Coast ports. By the late 19th century the U.S. Army Corps of Engineers was tasked to create a bustling harbor at the western end of Lake Superior. For several years they created breakwaters, dredged channels, and built docks to accommodate ever-larger cargo-hauling ships. By the turn of the 20th century, the Vermilion and Mesabi Iron Ranges were producing nearly 8 million long tons (8,100,000 Mg) of ore per year. The Corps was busy—between 1897 and 1902 they dredged 22 million cubic yards (17,000,000 cubic metres) out of the Duluth and Superior harbors, creating a 360-acre (150 ha) harbor with 17 miles (27 km) of ship channels. By 1906, the quantity of material shipped through the harbors was superseded only by that of New York and Philadelphia.

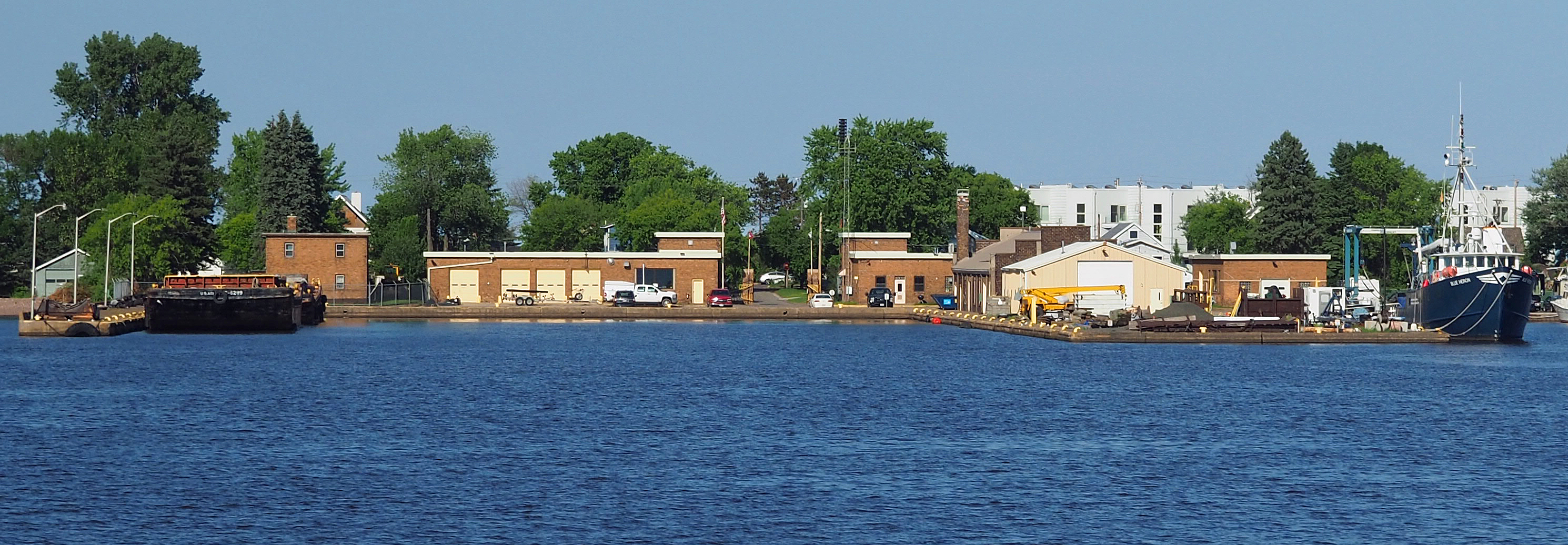
The Duluth Vessel Yard viewed from the water

== See also ==
- National Register of Historic Places listings in St. Louis County, Minnesota
