= Duluth Ship Canal =

Waterway in Minnesota, USA

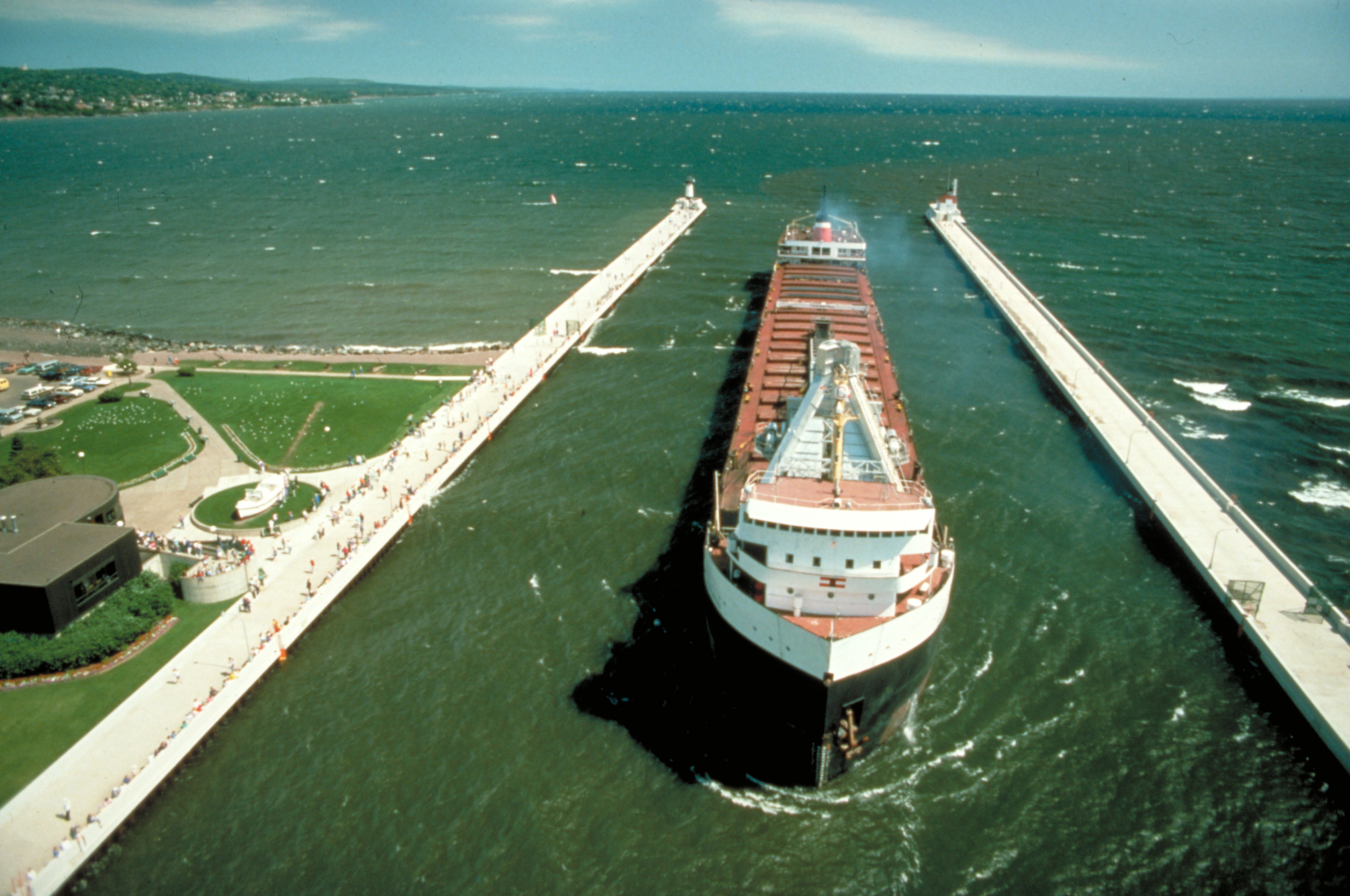
- SS Tarantau entering the Duluth Ship Canal from the lake. The two entrance lights can be seen at the end of the piers, while the museum building is at the left.
- Location: Duluth, Minnesota
- Country: United States
- Coordinates: 46°46′46″N 92°5′29″W

Specifications
- Length: 0.33 miles (0.53 km)
- Locks: None
- Status: Open

History
- Current owner: U.S. Army Corps of Engineers
- Construction began: 1870
- Date completed: 1871

Geography
- Start point: Lake Superior
- End point: Duluth Harbor Basin

The Duluth Ship Canal is an artificial canal cut through Minnesota Point, providing direct access to Duluth harbor from Lake Superior. Begun privately in 1871, it was put under federal supervision and maintenance several years later. It is still an important component of the harbor facilities.

In its current configuration, the canal is defined by a pair of breakwaters 1,720 feet (520 m) long and 300 feet (91 m) apart, constructed of concrete set on timber and stone cribbing. The canal is maintained at 245 feet (75 m) wide and 28 feet (8.5 m) LWD, allowing passage of ocean-going ships. Three lighthouses are placed on the sides of the canal: the Duluth North Pier Light and the Duluth South Breakwater Outer Light mark the lake ends of the canal, while the Duluth South Breakwater Inner Light functions with the south breakwater light as a range light. At the harbor end, the canal is straddled by the Aerial Lift Bridge which connects Minnesota Point to the rest of the city. On the north side, there is a building housing the local Corps of Engineers administration, as well as the Lake Superior Maritime Visitor Center. There are no locks; most ships transit the canal under their own power, though tug service is available in case of adverse weather. Around a thousand vessels a year ship from the Duluth–Superior port.

== History ==
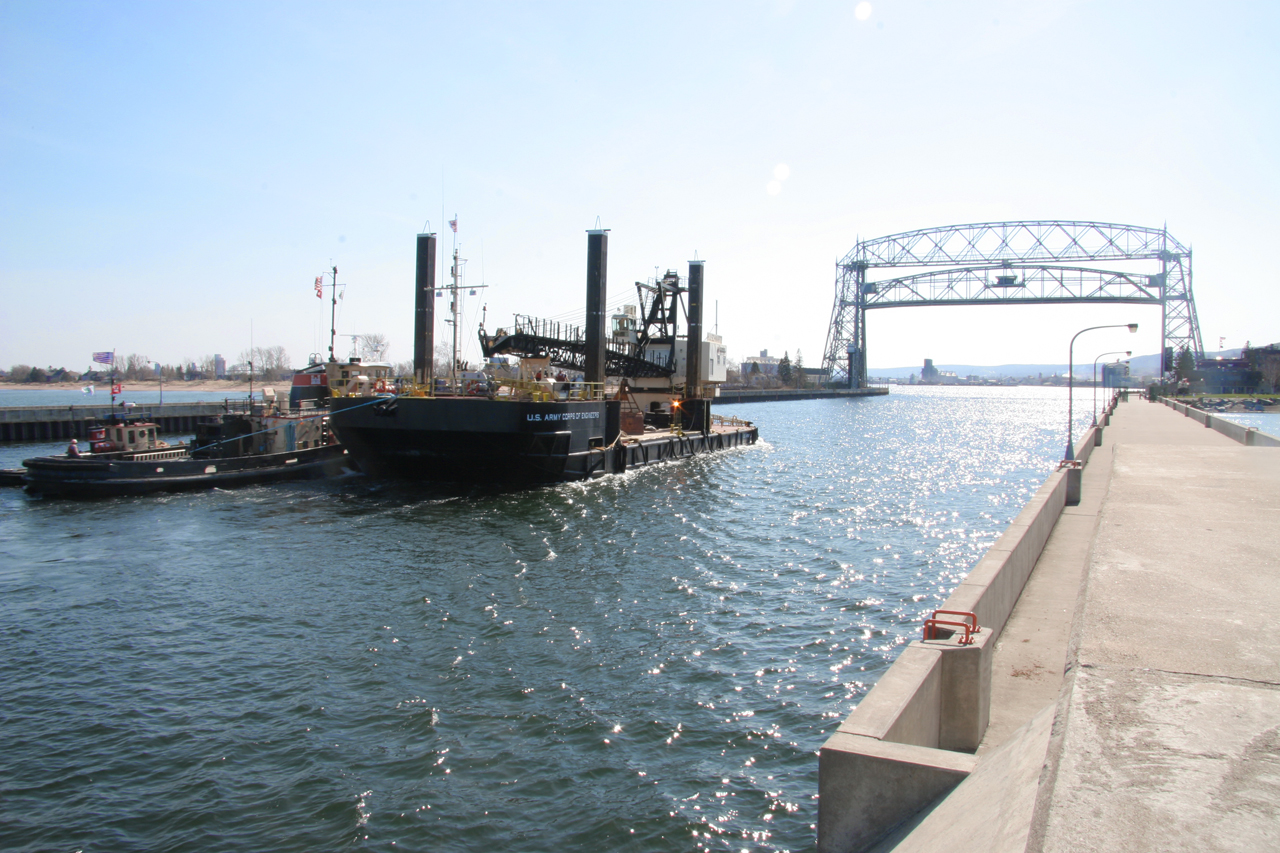
U.S. Army Corps of Engineers barge in the canal, looking towards Duluth.

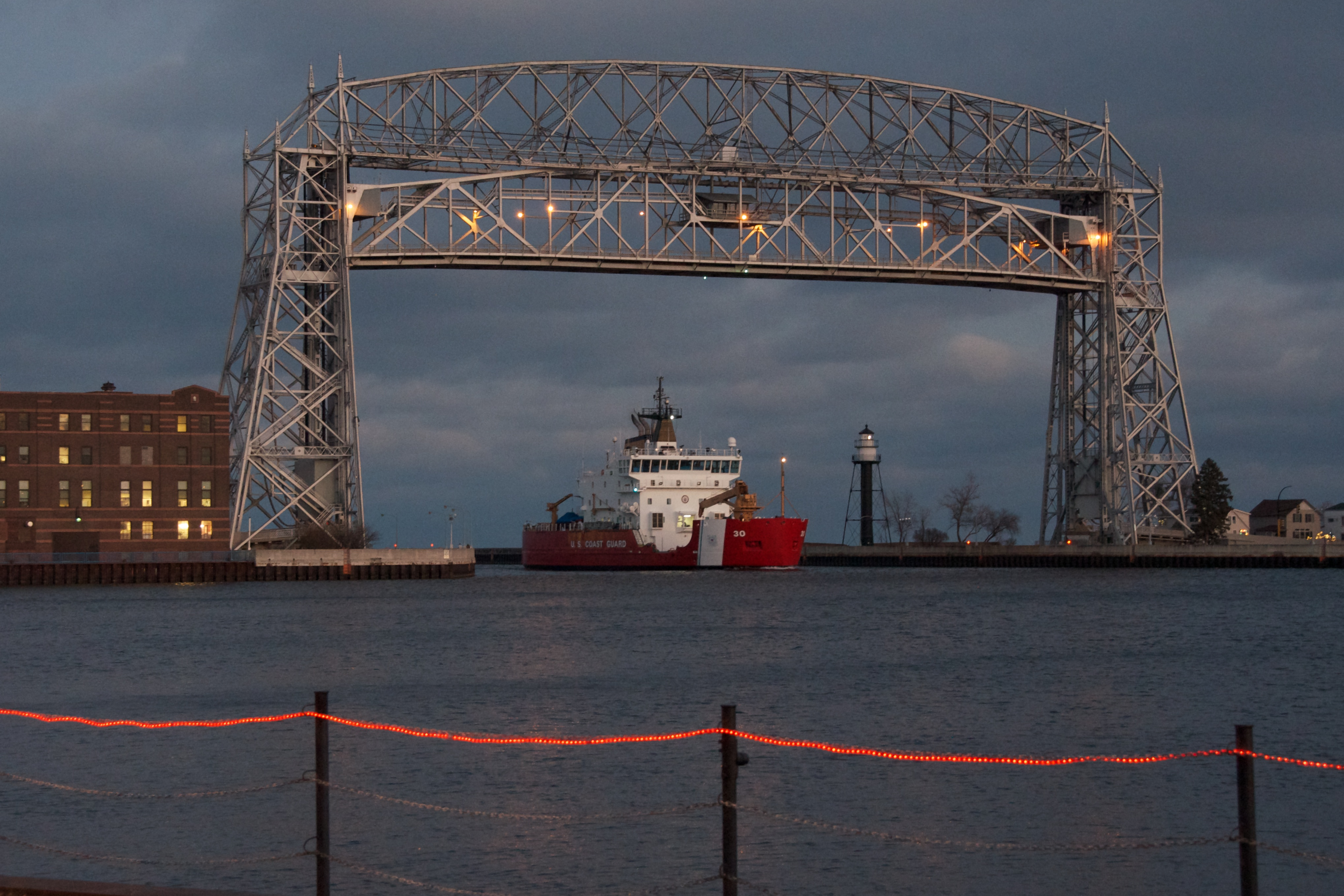
USCGC Mackinaw entering the harbor from the canal, beneath the Aerial Lift Bridge. The rear range light can be seen behind it.

The construction of the first locks on the St. Marys River in 1855 allowed for navigation between the lakes, and Superior Bay presented itself as an attractive harbor. From the point of view of Duluth residents, however, arrangements were less than satisfactory, as ships from that city had to pass Superior, Wisconsin on the way to the lake, as the only natural outlet was between Minnesota Point and Wisconsin Point at the far end of the bay. Also, while sheltered, the bay was not naturally as deep as was desirable, and the canal was convoluted. In 1865 a harbor was constructed outside the bay using a breakwater, and this was gradually improved over the next several years. A storm in 1871 destroyed the structure, and though it was rebuilt the next year, it was abandoned in 1878 due to ongoing ice and storm damage.

An 1866 report by Lt. Col. W. F. Raynolds of the Bureau of Topographical Engineers recommended cutting a canal through Minnesota Point, but due to the cost, no action was taken. Instead, a massive federal effort was undertaken to improve facilities in Superior. At the same time, the city of Duluth combined forces with the Lake Superior and Mississippi Railroad to dig a canal on their own. This began in 1870, and politicians in Wisconsin, seeing traffic through Superior threatened, went to the War Department to have construction stopped, eventually obtaining an injunction on July 13, 1871. They were too late. The canal was completed two months earlier, with local lore holding that on April 30, 1871, a group of city residents, summoned by brewer (and soon to be mayor) Sidney Luce, came to the site with shovels and picks and dug the first connection between the bay and the lake.

The injunction was soon lifted, at the cost of building a dike from Rice's Point to Minnesota Point, thus isolating the canal from the main flow of the Saint Louis River, which fed the bay and which formed the border between the rival cities. The dike did not last long; it suffered ice damage from the start and was gradually removed in the course of dredging. Federal responsibility for the latter, a result of the 1873 River and Harbor Act, gradually expanded into jurisdiction over all facilities in the area, with the Corps of Engineers taking over the canal in 1887.

The canal remains under the control of the Corps of Engineers to the present. In 1889, however, an attempt was made by Wilhelm Boeing, a Detroit businessman, to charge tolls for use of the canal. Boeing, the father of aircraft manufacturer William Boeing, owned property on both sides of the canal as well as thousands of acres of timber near Chisholm, and in 1888 his attorney had a string stretched across the entry to the canal to claim the right to charge tolls. This came to nothing, but the following October, flyers were distributed to shipping offices stating that a rope would be stretched across the canal on the fifteenth of the month to deny passage to all vessels. It is unclear what Boeing's intentions were, or whether he carried out his threat; but in any case his death the next month ended the matter.

The canal was, from the beginning, defined by piers along either side. These were initially timber cribs put in place by the city, albeit with some federal funding. They did not stand up to the harsh winter weather and required substantial maintenance every few years, up until an 1896 project to rebuild the canal. It was this project that gave the two piers their present form, with the new south pier completed in 1901, and the north pier completed the following year. In 1906 the present administration building was completed; this was enlarged in the 1940s, and a visitor center and museum was added to that in 1973. A maintenance yard was constructed on the south side of the canal. The Aerial Lift Bridge was constructed in 1905 to provide access to Minnesota Point, which was cut off from the mainland by construction of the canal.
