= Nemadji River =

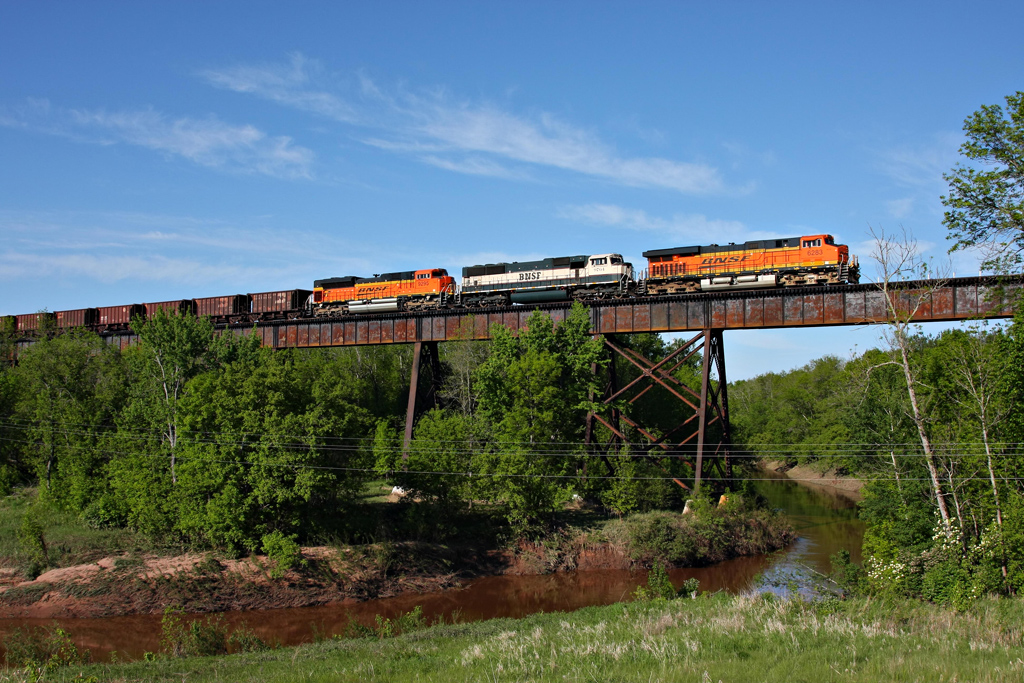
- A BNSF Railway freight train crosses the Nemadji near Boylston, Wisconsin

- Mouth of the Nemadji River
- Native name: Nemanjitigweyaag (Ojibwe)

Location
- Country: United States
- State: Minnesota and Wisconsin
- Counties: Carlton County, Minnesota, Pine County, Minnesota, Douglas County, Wisconsin

Physical characteristics
- Source
  - location: Nickerson, Minnesota
  - coordinates: 46.4007777°N 92.5079727°W
- Mouth: Lake Superior
  - location: Alouez Bay, Wisconsin
  - coordinates: 46°42′12″N 92°01′39″W
- Length: 70.8 miles (113.9 km)

The Nemadji River is a river rising in Pine County, Minnesota, United States, which flows through Carlton County, Minnesota, and Douglas County, Wisconsin, to Lake Superior. The river is 70.8 miles (113.9 km) long measured from its source in Maheu Lake in Pine County, and 34.9 miles (56.2 km) from its confluence with the South Fork in Carlton County just east of the Minnesota-Wisconsin border. The Nemadji River empties into Lake Superior in an industrial neighborhood at Allouez Bay in the city of Superior's east-side neighborhood of Allouez and Wisconsin Point.

== Course ==
Most of the rivers' length flows in Douglas County, Wisconsin, entering near Foxboro and exiting in East End, Superior, near Loons Foot Boat Landing, USH 2/53, and the BNSF Taconite Plant.

== History ==
Nemadji comes from the Ojibwe language, "ne-madji-tic-guay-och" (Nemanjitigweyaag in the current spelling), meaning "left river," opposed to the Saint Louis River, which when viewed from Allouez Bay is the "right river."

In the 1992 Nemadji River train derailment a Burlington Northern train derailed south of Superior, releasing nearly 22,000 gallons of aromatic hydrocarbons including liquid benzene, a highly toxic chemical, into the Nemadji River. Fish, wildlife, and other resources were severely affected by the incident. In March 2004, the U.S. Fish and Wildlife Service proposed a draft that would use funds received from a settlement with Burlington Northern to restore a portion of the Lake Superior basin affected by the incident. The river runs through the City of Superior, Town of Summit, Town of Superior, and the counties of Douglas, Carlton, Pine.

== Activities ==
The Nemadji River provides residents and tourist abundant activities across all seasons. Activities such as Hiking, ATV riding, snowmobiling, horseback riding, dispersed camping, fishing, hunting are all conducted in the Nemadji State Forest, which is in Minnesota and borders Wisconsin. Trails in this forest include the Nemadji River Trail and Gandy Dancer Trail, which include 98 miles of hiking along the river.

Fishing along the Nemadji River is also a popular activity. Prime spots include the River Bend, Sandy Shoals, Forest Confluence, and the Stone Bridge Crossing. These areas provide easy access for fishers and have been known to produce Smallmouth Bass, Northern Pike, Walleye, Brown Trout, and Catfish. Birdwatching and Photography are also prominent activities along the river, most notably at the Upper Nemadji Floodplain Forest which features a unique floodplain forest ecosystem directly along the river's meanders. The River also flows by Nemadji Golf Course.

Additionally, the River is a popular camping destination. The largest campground is the Nemadji Campground which overlooks the Nemadji River where it flows into Lake Superior. This campground includes both tent and RV camping, fishing, a boat launch on the river, and kayak rentals.

== See also ==
- List of rivers of Minnesota
- List of longest streams of Minnesota
