= 2018 Superior Refinery explosion =

Oil refinery explosion

Superior Refinery explosion
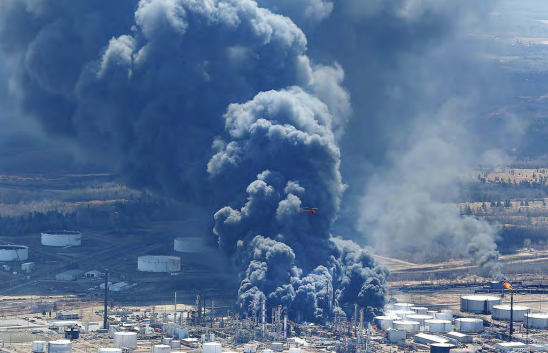
- Smoke billowing from the refinery during the fire.
- Date: April 26, 2018
- Time: 10:00 AM CST
- Location: Superior, Wisconsin; 46°41′23.9″N 92°04′13.4″W
- Type: Oil refinery explosion and fire
- Deaths: 0
- Injuries: 36

On April 26, 2018, an explosion and subsequent fire occurred at the Superior Refining Company LLC refinery in Superior, Wisconsin, owned by Canadian refining company Husky Energy at the time of the incident. What began as an explosion and subsequent fire at the plant at 10:00 AM CST was dealt with accordingly close to noon. However, the explosion had sent debris flying across the refinery; one piece struck an above ground storage tank, which caused the release of over 15,000 barrels of asphalt. The asphalt spilled along the grounds of the plant, ignited, and sent a thick plume of black smoke into the air. Evacuations were ordered in the city of Superior, including businesses, schools, and a hospital.

The fire was extinguished later in the evening, and the evacuation order would be lifted the following morning. 36 refinery employees were treated for injuries resulting from the explosion. There were no fatalities. The explosion and fire caused around $550 million in damage to the refinery.

== Background ==
The oil refinery, the only one in the state of Wisconsin, and located in the city of Superior, which processes 50,000 barrels of oil a day, was acquired by Husky Energy from Calumet Specialty Products Partners in November 2017, retaining 180 Calumet employees. The company processes heavy oil from oil sands and conventional operations in western Canada.

The refinery has a partnership with the Superior Fire Department, which provides its personnel training and resources when fighting industrial fires. It was eventually acquired by Canadian oil company Cenovus Energy in March 2021. The refinery is now owned by Canada-based Cenovus Energy, following its $2.9 billion acquisition of Husky Energy in March 2021.

== Early morning closure ==
On the morning of the explosion, at 5:30 a.m., refinery workers were planning to shut down the Fluid Catalytic Cracking Unit (FCCU) of the refinery for routine maintenance. The FCCU is used to break down hydrocarbons from crude oil into smaller hydrocarbons, which can blend into products such as gasoline. When the FCCU is shut down, slide valves in the middle of the unit control the flow of a solid catalyst between a reactor, containing flammable hydrocarbons, and a regenerator, containing air. Any mixture or contact between the hydrocarbons and air can result in an explosion.

On the morning of the incident, refinery personnel began their shutdown of the unit by stopping the circulation of the catalyst, as well as the flow of hydrocarbons into the reactor, by shutting the slide valves in the unit. One of the slide valves was corroded, meaning that even when it was closed, it allowed catalyst to spill through the barrier into the regenerator, leaving a path for air and hydrocarbons to flow through the two pieces of equipment. Air flowed through the reactor, and eventually into other units of the refinery that contained flammable hydrocarbons.

== Explosion and fire ==
The mixture of the air and hydrocarbons resulted in a massive explosion in the FCCU at approximately 10:00 a.m. that morning. The explosion sent debris flying 200 feet, one piece puncturing a hole in an above-ground storage tank that contained around 50,000 barrels of asphalt, causing the asphalt to spill along the ground into the refinery's main units, including the FCCU. The asphalt then ignited, causing thick black smoke to travel into the air. The smoke was so intense it was picked up on weather radar.

== Evacuation ==
The black smoke traveled southeast as far as Solon Springs in Douglas County. An evacuation of the plant was ordered at 1:00 p.m., then at 2:41 p.m., an evacuation for residents 10 miles south of the plant was ordered due to concerns of the toxicity of the huge plumes of black smoke. Residents who lived 3 miles north, east, and south of the refinery were also ordered to evacuate due to concerns about the change in the direction of the wind forcing the toxic smoke above more homes, and due to concerns about the refinery's hydrofluoric acid tank causing potential further explosions and damage.

Schools in the Superior School District as well as the Essentia Health-St. Mary's Medical Center in Superior was also urged to evacuate. Students were evacuated to an AMSOIL building in northwestern Superior. Schools in the Maple School District in Douglas County were also closed as a precaution. Those injured were taken to hospitals in Duluth, Minnesota.

It is one of Superior's largest evacuation orders to date since the 1992 benzene spill in the Nemadji River, which led to the evacuation of around 80,000 residents from Superior, Duluth, and surrounding communities.

== Firefight ==
The fire was initially expected to burn for days. The refinery's emergency response team, as well as the Superior Fire Department, initially went defensive against the fire due to concerns of safety due to the intense heat as well as other units of the refinery which were a cause of concern.

The large asphalt fire was extinguished with foam, and the fires around the crude unit of the refinery were extinguished with dry chemical fire extinguisher and water. The fire was fully extinguished at 7 p.m., however the evacuation order remained in place until 6 am the next day due to concerns regarding the stability of the plant's hydrogen fluoride tank.

== Investigation, lawsuit, and aftermath ==
=== CSB Investigation ===
Animated outline of the incident published in 2019 by the U.S. Chemical Safety Board

The U.S. Chemical Safety Board released their final report on the incident on December 29, 2022, saying that the incident "could have been prevented," citing that the debris that was ejected into the air and hit the asphalt tank which caused the fire, could have hit a tank of highly hazardous hydrogen fluoride, since the tank was approximately 150 feet away from the explosion site, 50 feet closer than the damaged asphalt tank. The board also suggested to the Superior refinery to implement safeguards to prevent explosions in the cracking unit and a "slide valve mechanical integrity program that addresses erosion and ensures proper functioning of the slide valves during a shutdown."

Cenovus put out a statement after the report stating that the refinery is cooperating with the CSB to implement their recommendations into the refinery's rebuild, one of them being "new state-of-the-art slide valves in the Fluid Catalytic Cracking unit with enhanced safeguards such as advanced instrumentation to monitor performance in real-time and ensure the operations and engineering staff can carefully assess performance."

=== Hydrogen-fluoride controversy ===
Controversy began to rise surrounding the facility's use of HF. Superior Mayor Jim Paine and Duluth Mayor Emily Larson have publicly come forward expressing disapproval with the plant's use of the chemical, citing multiple safety hazards to the surrounding communities had the HF tank been affected by the fire.

=== Lawsuit ===
Husky Energy faced a class-action lawsuit against residents who were forced to evacuate their homes, citing a section from the report of the USCSB that stated that their equipment "failed to separate oxygen and hydrocarbons, allowing a flammable mixture to form." Husky reached a $1M settlement in July 2021.

=== Rebuild ===
Reconstruction of the refinery began in the fall of 2019, and is expected to become fully operational in early 2023. Construction was halted in May 2020 due to the COVID-19 pandemic, but was resumed in June 2020. The Refinery reopened in the spring of 2023 completing the $1.2 billion effort to rebuild the facility. The final cost of rebuilding was nearly triple the initial estimates for the project. The U.S. Chemical Safety Board made 16 recommendations to improve safety at the facility. Superior Mayor Jim Paine and Cenovus Energy have signaled that these recommendations are being adhered to in the reopening process.

On April 26, 2023, Cenovus Energy said in an earnings call that the facility would be operating at its full capacity of nearly 50,000 crude oil barrels daily by the end of June 2023.

=== "Husky Friends" ===
In April 2022, close to the fourth anniversary of the explosion, a group claiming to be a PR firm for Cenovus Energy called "Husky Friends" sent Superior residents postcards and kits containing information about hydrogen fluoride. Cenovus came forward after the group began to announce their campaign to the press saying that they have no ties to the organization. The group's spokesperson told a local news channel in Duluth that the group's intent was to warn people about the dangers of HF using satire. The company has not filed legal action against the firm or announced any plans to.

== Gallery ==
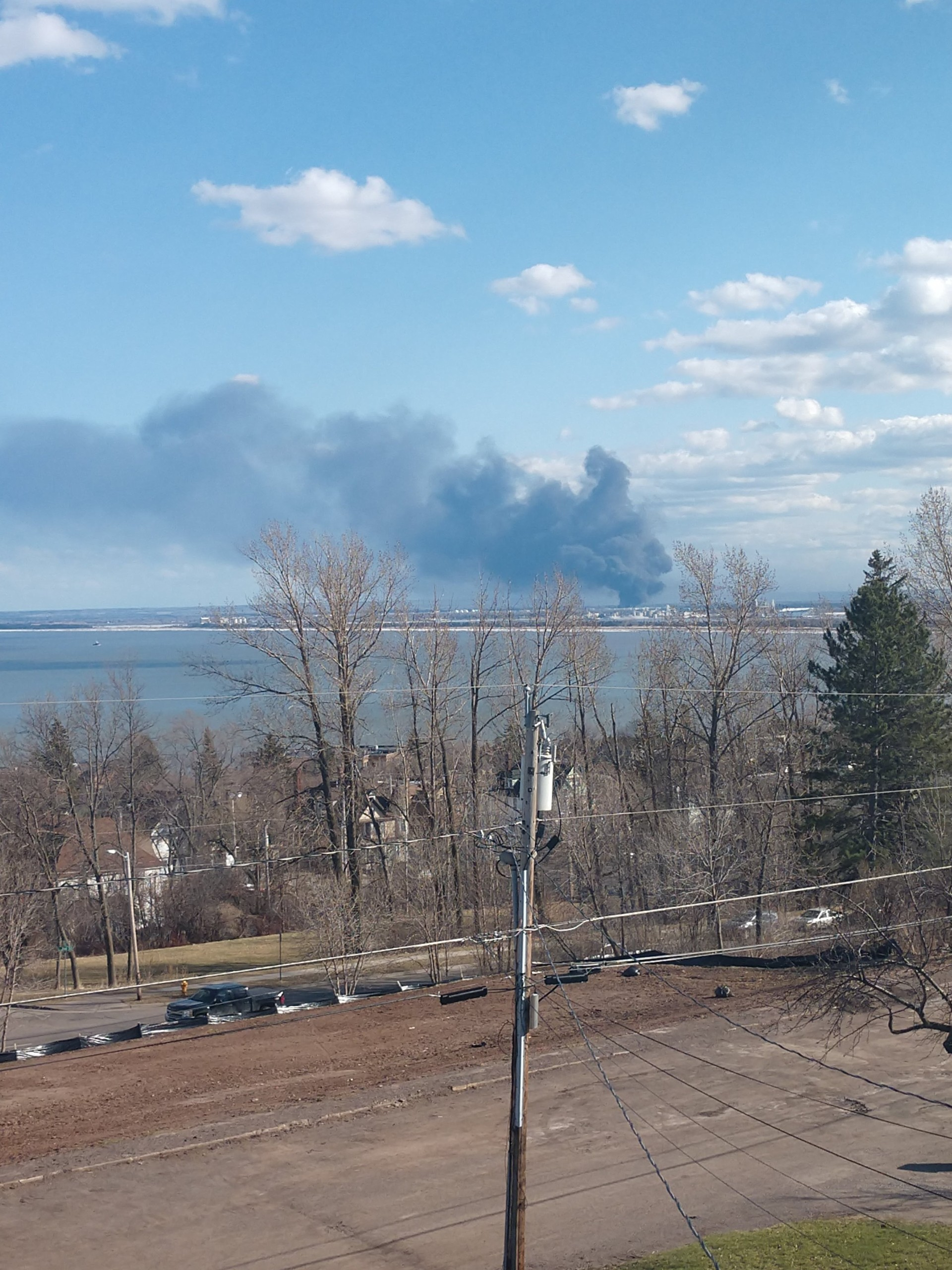
View of the fire from the refinery from Duluth, Minnesota.

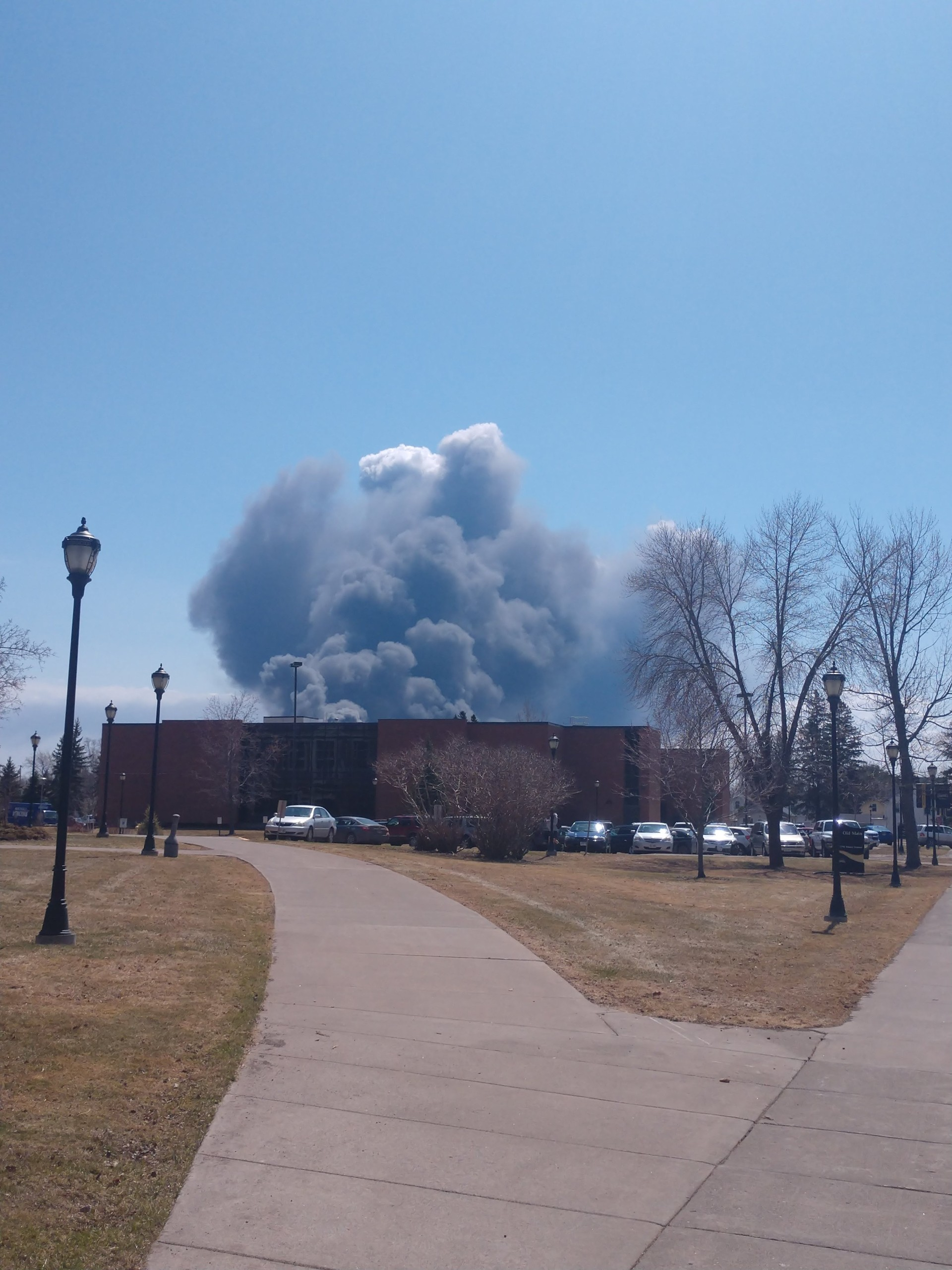
View of the fire looking south-east from the campus of the University of Wisconsin-Superior.

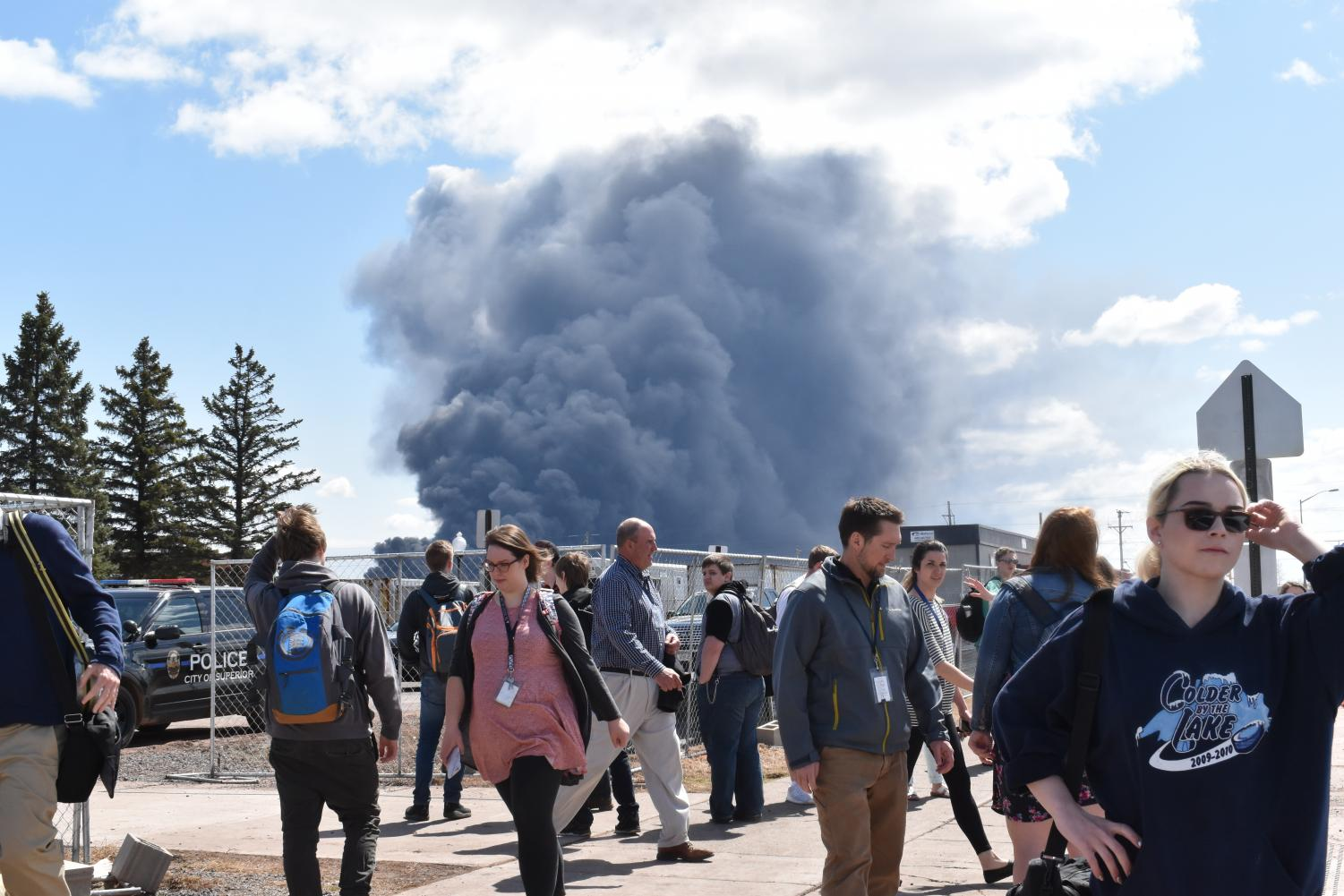
Students wait for rides after schools are evacuated following the fire.
