= Lake Superior National Estuarine Research Reserve =

Research reserve

Coordinates: 46.668°N 92.18°W

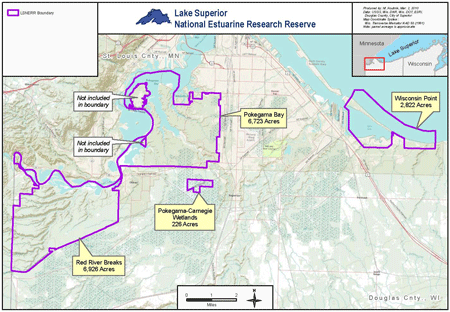

The Lake Superior National Estuarine Research Reserve includes land and water areas along the St. Louis River and Lake Superior in Douglas County, in the northwest corner of Wisconsin, United States. It is one of 29 National Estuarine Research Reserves. The Reserve is operated as a program of the Natural Resources Institute of the University of Wisconsin-Madison Division of Extension. It has an area of 16,697 acres (6,757 ha), and was designated in 2010.

== Location ==
The Lake Superior Reserve is situated on the westernmost tip of Lake Superior, and represents portions of the lower St. Louis River freshwater estuary within the state of Wisconsin. The St. Louis River is the largest United States tributary to Lake Superior and flows 179 miles (288 km) through a 3,634 square miles (9,410 km^{2}) watershed within Wisconsin and Minnesota, eventually creating 23 miles (37 km) of the boundary between the two states.

== Diversity ==
The site is diverse and includes the following representative ecosystem types: maritime forest-woodland (northern coniferous biome, temperate deciduous forest biome), coastal shrublands, coastal grasslands, coastal marshes and coastal swamps. The hydrographic characteristics of the site include stratified circulation, with a tide type dominated by wind/storm tides and related seiche (sometimes called “slosh”). Surface water runoff from the St. Louis River watershed is the primary source of freshwater into the estuarine system.

The Reserve includes areas of national significance, including the world's largest freshwater bay mouth sand bar (Wisconsin Point), estuarine wetlands, and steep highly erodible red clay bluffs. Significant historic and cultural sites exist within or adjacent to the boundary including Native American cultural sites throughout the estuary and on Wisconsin Point and historic lumbering and shipping sites along the estuary's shore.

The wetlands of the St. Louis River freshwater estuary form one of the largest complexes of estuarine wetlands in the Lake Superior Basin. The coastal wetland complex is a mosaic of varying combinations of submergent marsh, emergent marsh, wet meadows or fens, and wet shrublands. Two Wisconsin State Natural Areas (SNAs) and 11 Wisconsin Priority Wetlands are found within the boundaries.

Recently, Priority Conservation Opportunity Areas were identified for Wisconsin's Wildlife Action Plan. Through that process, the wetlands and boreal forest associated with the St. Louis River freshwater estuary complex were identified as an area of continental significance. While some portions of the Reserve have been influenced and altered by human activities, the many designations and recognitions of valuable habitats within the St. Louis River freshwater estuary complex clearly indicate that there are portions that remain relatively pristine.

On the bay mouth bars that separate the river from Lake Superior, there are rare plant communities that are found only in the Great Lakes region. Major site features include several miles of open sand beach and dunes, small interdunal wetlands, and a xeric forest of white and red pines. The transition zone between boreal forest, northern hardwoods forest, and Great Lakes pine forest is also unique.

== Components ==
The 16,697-acre (6,757 ha) Lake Superior Reserve is a combination of four distinct land components and portions of the connecting waterways in the northwest corner of Wisconsin where the St. Louis River flows into Lake Superior. Each component possesses its own combination of habitats.

The Reserve includes uplands and submerged lands; riparian and riverine habitat; riverine islands; emergent freshwater marshes, interdunal wetlands and scrub swamp; aspen, dry and hardwood forests; and open sand beach and dunes. The four components are not contiguous but are located within 10 miles (16 km) of each other.

=== The Red River Breaks ===
This component consists primarily of state-owned upland and wetland habitats along the St. Louis River. Its 6,926 acres (2,803 ha) make it the largest component within the Reserve.

=== Pokegama Bay component ===
Unique to the Reserve System, the Pokegama Bay component, downstream of Red River Breaks, contains one of the largest municipal forests in the United States. Its 6,723 acres (2,721 ha) contain extensive forested wetlands, uplands, clay flats and submerged lands.

=== South of Pokegama Bay ===
South of Pokegama Bay is the smallest component, the Pokegama-Carnegie Wetlands. Owned by the Wisconsin Department of Natural Resources (WDNR), this 226-acre (91 ha) area is part of the largest and most intact red clay wetlands remaining in northwest Wisconsin.

=== Wisconsin Point ===
The Wisconsin Point component is approximately 2,822 acres (1,142 ha) of estuarine wetlands, dry forest and Lake Superior water and lake bed. Wisconsin Point has exceptional habitat value and includes a bay mouth bar separating the waters of Lake Superior from Allouez Bay. Native American tribal cultural sites are found on Wisconsin Point and throughout the lower St. Louis River freshwater estuary. The lands within this component are owned by a combination of city, county, state, and university entities.

== Sponsors and facilities ==
The Reserve is sponsored by the Cooperative Extension division of University of Wisconsin-Extension and hosted at the University of Wisconsin-Superior. Reserve offices and research facilities are on Barker's Island in Superior Bay, part of the Duluth-Superior harbor.

== Freshwater estuaries ==
The Lake Superior Reserve site represents a previously unrepresented biogeographic region within the National Estuarine Research Reserve System – the Great Lakes, Lake Superior subregion. The Lake Superior Reserve and the Old Woman Creek (Lake Erie in Ohio) are the only Great Lakes freshwater estuaries in the Reserve System.

This subregion contains all of Lake Superior and its freshwater estuaries. One of these estuaries formed where the waters of the St. Louis River enter Lake Superior. Lake Superior, which is bordered by Michigan, Minnesota, Wisconsin and Ontario, Canada, is the largest of the Great Lakes and the most pristine.

Freshwater estuaries occur where rivers and Great Lakes water mix in shallow wetlands located near the mouth of a river. The Reserve contains all three common defining characteristics of a Great Lakes freshwater estuary including a) presence of a drowned river mouth b) adequate zone of transition between lake and river water and c) influence from tide or seiche.
