= 1992 Nemadji River train derailment =

Train derailment in Superior, Wisconsin, US

Coordinates: 46.59418°N 92.12086°W

- Aerial shot of the derailment, a tanker is visible in the Nemadji River.

- 1992 Nemadji River train derailment (Wisconsin)

Details
- Location: Superior, Wisconsin
- Country: United States
- Incident type: Train derailment

On June 30, 1992, a Burlington Northern Railroad freight train derailed on a bridge over the Nemadji River at the southern edge of the town of Superior, Wisconsin. The derailment resulted in a liquid benzene spill into the river. The fumes from the spill led to an evacuation of an estimated 80,000 residents from the town of Superior, the city of Superior and Duluth, Minnesota, apparently the largest evacuation in U.S. history resulting from a train accident.

== Background ==
The Burlington Northern freight train involved in the accident was made up of three locomotives and 54 freight cars. The train crew consisted of: an engineer, a conductor and a brakeman.

== Derailment and the Benzene Release Spill ==
The derailment of the southbound freight train happened at about 2:50 am June 30, 1992, at the intersection of Wisconsin Highway 35, the railroad line and the Nemadji River. The train's, three engines and several freight cars made it safely across the bridge and onto the other side before the derailment occurred. Three tank cars as well as a boxcar, a hopper and several bulkhead flatcars loaded with lumber, derailed on the curve that led straight towards the bridge. Due to the 'dragging effect' of the derailed freight cars in the middle portion of the train, resulted in tumbling off the rails in the middle section of the bridge and plunging 75 feet down into the river below. Directly behind the derailed cars of the mid-section of the train, several of the derailed cars on the curve leading upto the trestle, tipped over onto their sides, spilling lumber all over the place, while the remaining cars at the rear of the train remained on the tracks unharmed. When the derailment happened, the engine crew felt a jolt and brought the train to an emergency stop. After noticing that there was a derailment, they immediately radioed the BN dispatcher about the accident. One of the train's tank cars fell 75 feet from the bridge into the Nemadji River. The ruptured car released nearly 22,000 gallons of aromatic concentrates including liquid benzene and toluene into the river. Thirteen other derailed cars fell onto land banks. Two of these cars were carrying propane; other cars were carrying lumber. The water at the location of the BN bridge over Nemadji River was seven feet deep. The US NOAA's initial statement that day estimated the water flow rate to be 830,000 gpm, and that accordingly, the water would soon flush away spilled oil product. However, in the NOAA's early statement, it said that the water in Superior Bay was stagnant with a high turbidity.

A toxic cloud of the benzene formed about Duluth and Superior. Benzene is a clear and flammable liquid. It is used for the creation of lacquers, varnishes and other admixtures.

Government offices were closed on both sides of the Minnesota-Wisconsin border. Inmates in the St. Louis County, Minnesota jail were moved elsewhere. The Duluth Transit Authority was utilized in evacuated residents from senior apartments and nursing homes. Roads into Superior were closed. Superior police captain Doug Osell said, "It looked like a ghost town. Cars were leaving in droves." About 50,000 residents from Duluth were evacuated and about 35,000 people from Superior were evacuated. Around 205 Army and Air National Guard members from Minnesota and Wisconsin assisted with the evacuations and security.

26 people were treated at area hospitals for irritations after breathing the benzene fumes. The benzene gases created a visible haze. The benzene cloud moved west of Duluth and dissipated on account of rain. The evacuation order was lifted from Duluth at 3:30 pm and from Superior at 6:00 pm.

== Responses by government officials ==
Wisconsin Governor Tommy Thompson on the day of the accident declared a state of emergency for Douglas County, the county of Superior. Thompson and the Minnesota governor Arne Carlson convened late in the day.

== Environmental effects ==
On August 3rd, 1992, the Wisconsin Department of Natural Resources reported that the spill from derailment killed thousands of fish and an unspecified number of other animals. The DNR's report said that most of the dead fish were carp, suckers, redhorse, shiners, and minnows. The report went on to say that the rains subsequent to the spill "helped to dilute the chemical and probably reduced the potential magnitude of the fish kill." The report said that 16 species of wild animals and six species of domestic animals died. The DNR report also stated that vegetation along the Nemadji River suffered damage.

Residual oil from the spill traveled downstream north to Superior Bay, Allouez Bay, and Lake Superior.

== The Cause of Derailment ==
The National Transportation Safety Board (NTSB) investigated the derailment and reported that the train had derailed because of 'bad track', by a invisible fault known as "shelling". Shelling is a deterioration of the rails from the inside out. It is very hard to see from the naked eye. In its report, the NTSB faulted the Federal Railroad Administration (FRA) for not inspecting the track properly before the accident occurred.

== Legal settlement and pledges by Burlington Northern ==
On April 4, 1995, it was announced that Burlington Northern agreed to make payments in a settlement over this spill and for two other spills in Wyoming. In the settlement, Burlington Northern agreed to pay $1.5 million. $1.1 million of this was a civil penalty under the Oil Pollution Act of 1990. The consent decree also obliged the railroad to spend $1.2 million in technology to prevent derailments. The railroad agreed to buy three ultrasonic rail inspection cars which would improve the ability to find rail defects and prevent derailments. Additionally, the railroad agreed to pay the US Environmental Protection Agency and other federal agencies for costs in response to the oil spill. The railroad also agreed to pay $250,000 to a fund managed cooperatively by the U.S. Department of the Interior, the Bad River of Lake Superior Chippewas and the Red Cliff Band of Lake Superior Chippewa. Lastly, Burlington Northern committed pay $100,000 to a fund for the use of studying the type of rail defects in the Nemadji River train derailment.

== Media ==
The derailment and benzene spill was featured in an episode of A&E's Investigative Reports episode "Danger on the Rails".
