= Duluth South Breakwater Inner Light =

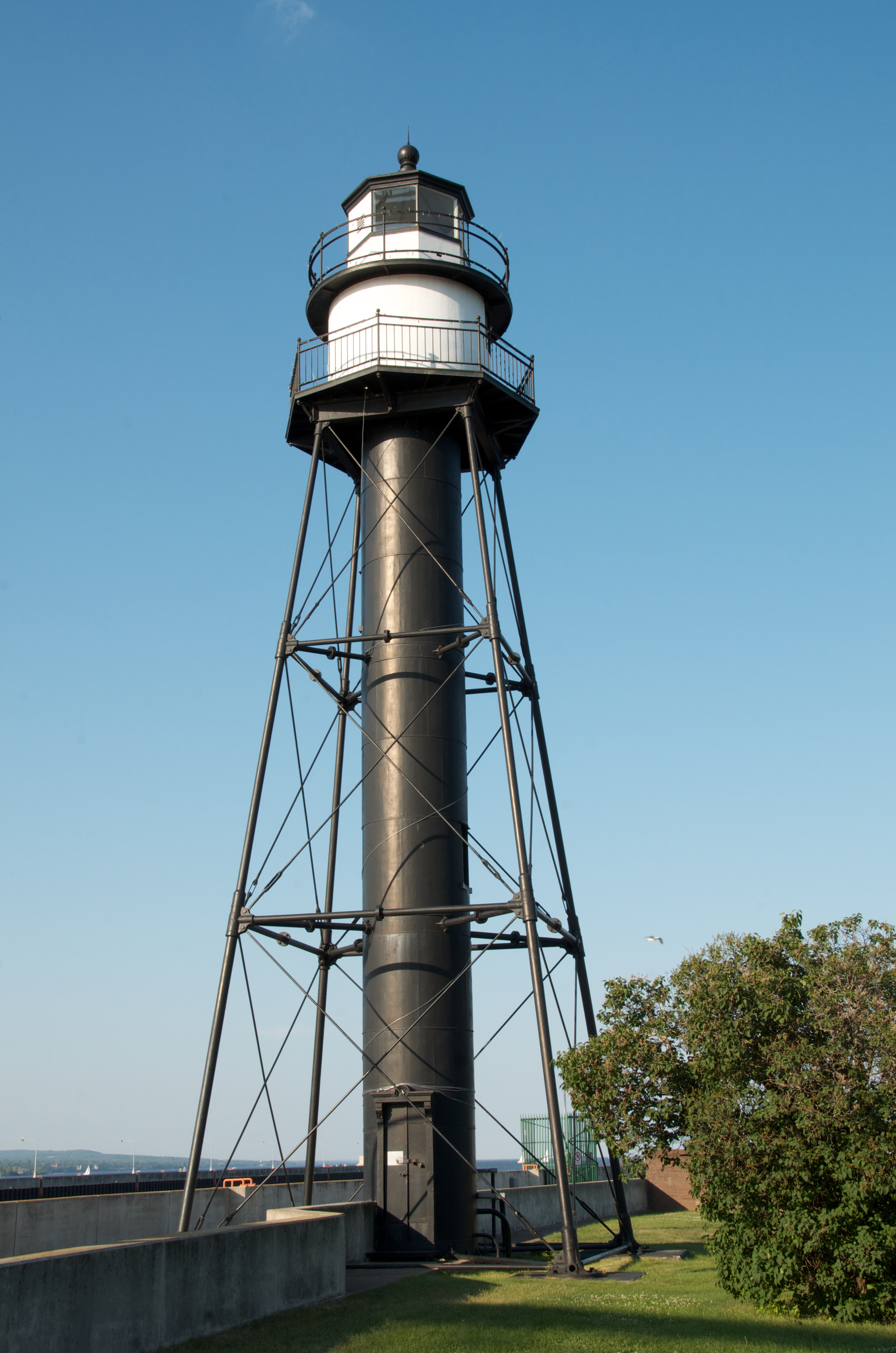
- The Duluth South Breakwater Inner Light from the southwest
- Location: South Breakwater, south pier of the Duluth Ship Canal, Duluth, Minnesota
- Coordinates: 46°46′43.4″N 92°5′31.3″W

Tower
- Constructed: 1889
- Foundation: Concrete pier (current)
- Construction: Steel/cast iron
- Automated: 1976
- Height: 70 ft (21 m)
- Shape: Skeletal tower
- Markings: Black with white lantern
- Heritage: National Register of Historic Places listed place

Light
- First lit: 1889 (first tower); 1901 (current tower)
- Focal height: 68 ft (21 m)
- Lens: Fourth order Fresnel lens
- Range: 15 nmi (28 km; 17 mi)
- Characteristic: Fl W 5s
- Duluth South Breakwater Inner (Duluth Range Rear) Lighthouse
- U.S. National Register of Historic Places
- Area: 0.3 acres (0.12 ha)
- MPS: U.S. Coast Guard Lighthouses and Light Stations on the Great Lakes TR
- NRHP reference No.: 83000945
- Added to NRHP: August 4, 1983

The Duluth South Breakwater Inner Light is a lighthouse on the south breakwater of the Duluth Ship Canal in Duluth, Minnesota, United States. It forms a range with the Duluth South Breakwater Outer Light to guide ships into the canal from Lake Superior. The current structure was built from 1900 to 1901.

== History ==
The original configuration of the breakwaters was graced by a tower on the south side of the lake entrance in 1874, shortly after the canal was constructed. Requests for funds to construct a corresponding light on the inner end of the breakwater were made beginning in 1880, but an appropriation was not made until 1889. Construction proceeded quickly on an open wooden pyramidal tower surmounted by a watch room and iron lantern, the latter housing a fourth-order Fresnel lens which rotated to provide a six-second flash; the light was first displayed on September 1 of that year. On the 17th, the India struck the end of the breakwater, but the damage to the light was minor and quickly repaired.

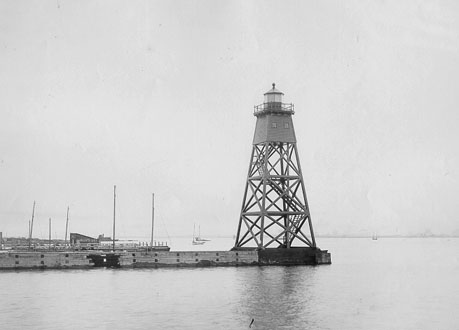
The first rear light circa 1893

The reconstruction of the canal as part of the 1896 harbor upgrade forced rearrangement and replacement of the lights. The south breakwater was rebuilt with concrete piers from 1898 to 1900 and, upon completion, temporary lights were erected while new permanent lights were built. A new rear tower was constructed, standing at the edge of the pier near the lake shore. This structure, a square three-stage skeletal pyramid with a central cylindrical enclosed staircase, was originally painted white with a black lantern and watch room; at some point, however, the color scheme was reversed to the current black tower and white lantern. The original lens was reused, but was replaced with a modern acrylic flasher in 1995 when it was found in need of repair. The lens was given to the Lake Superior Maritime Visitor Center, where it was restored and put on display.

It was listed on the National Register of Historic Places as the Duluth South Breakwater Inner (Duluth Range Rear) Lighthouse in 1983 for its local significance in the themes of commerce, engineering, and transportation. It was nominated for being one of the federal navigation aids essential to the development of the Great Lakes as the nation's most important transportation system in the 19th and early 20th centuries.

The light remains in service, but in 2008 the tower was sold at auction to a pair of Duluth residents after an offer to donate it to educational or non-profit organizations found no takers.

== See also ==
- List of lighthouses in Minnesota
- National Register of Historic Places listings in St. Louis County, Minnesota
