= Wisconsin Point Light =

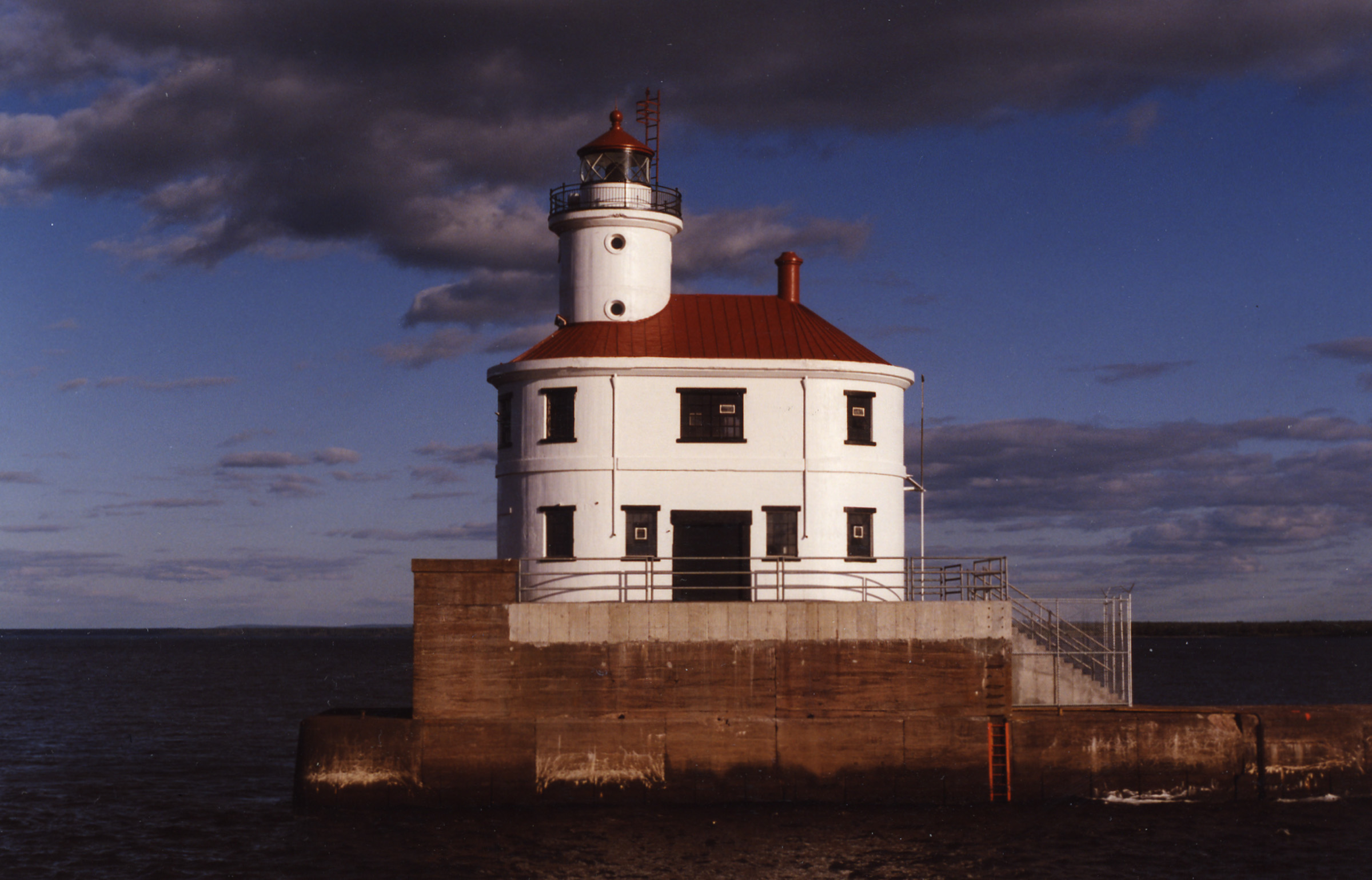
- Wisconsin Point Lighthouse
- Location: Superior Wisconsin
- Coordinates: 46°42′36.5″N 92°00′23″W

Tower
- Constructed: 1913
- Foundation: Concrete pier
- Construction: Concrete
- Automated: 1970
- Height: 56 feet (17 m)
- Shape: Cylindrical, atop square (rounded corners) keeper's house
- Markings: White with red lantern, red roof on house
- Heritage: National Register of Historic Places listed place
- Fog signal: HORN: 1 blast ev 30s (3s bl); operates from May 1 to October 20

Light
- First lit: 1913
- Focal height: 70 feet (21 m)
- Lens: Fourth order Fresnel lens (original), DCB 24 Carlisle & Finch Aerobeacon (current)
- Range: 21 nautical miles (39 km; 24 mi)
- Characteristic: Green flashing, 5 s
- Superior Entry South Breakwater Light
- U.S. National Register of Historic Places
- Area: less than one acre
- Built by: U.S. Bureau of Lighthouses
- MPS: Light Stations of the United States MPS
- NRHP reference No.: 07000102
- Added to NRHP: March 1, 2007

The Wisconsin Point Light is a lighthouse located in Superior, on Wisconsin Point, in Douglas County, Wisconsin, United States.

The light and attached fog horn building sits within a 10-mile (16 km) long sand bar – stretching between the ports of Duluth and Superior. This sand bar makes the Duluth–Superior Harbor one of the safest harbors in the world. It is "reputedly the longest freshwater sand bar in the world" and is split by this opening near its center, where the lighthouse is located. The Minnesota side of the opening is known as "Minnesota Point" (Park Point) and the Wisconsin side is known as "Wisconsin Point." It was added to the National Register of Historic Places in 2007. It stands erect at 70 ft. tall.

== History ==
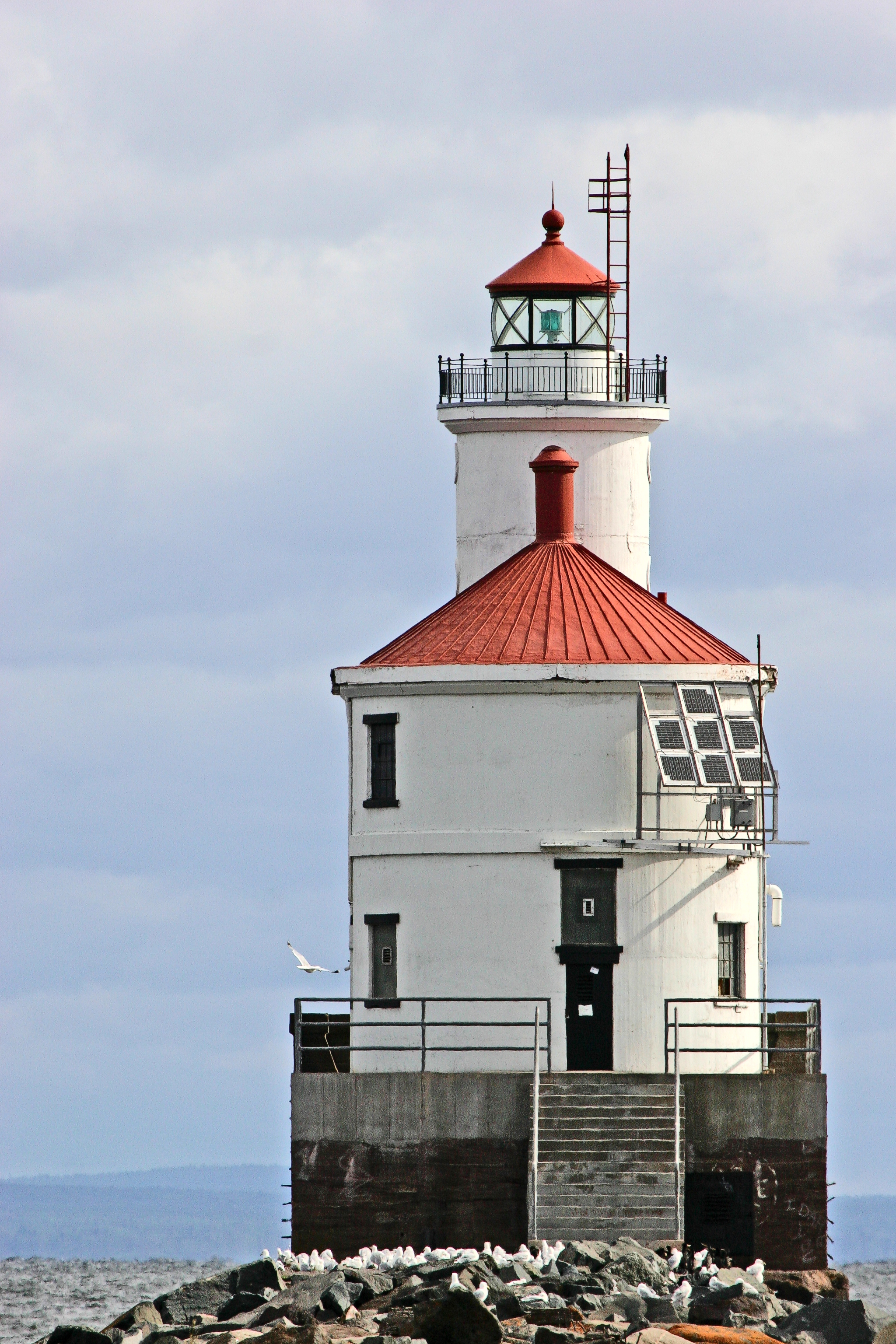
Rear view of Wisconsin Point Light house

The original Fresnel lens was manufactured by Sautter, Lemonnier, and Company of Paris in 1890. It was replaced with a DCB-224 aero beacon manufactured by the Carlisle & Finch Company.

It is an active navigational aid and is known as the South Breakwater Light by the United States Coast Guard in the Volume VII light list and the United States Geological Survey Geographic Names Information System.

It is located on the southern Superior Harbor entry breakwall. The Saint Louis River, which rises in Minnesota, becomes the Saint Louis Bay, then flows into Superior Bay and exits into Lake Superior via the ship canals, at each end of (Park Point) Minnesota Point.

In July 2019, the lighthouse superstructure was put up for sale in an online auction by the U.S. GSA. The breakwater upon which it sits and the navigational aid housed within would remain U.S. Government property after the sale.
