= Minnesota Point =

Neighborhood in Duluth, Minnesota, United States of America

Coordinates: 46°44′29″N 92°03′41″W

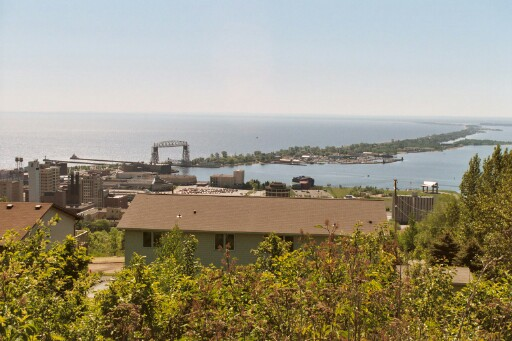
Minnesota Point / Park Point from the Duluth, Minnesota hillside looking south toward Wisconsin

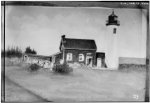
Old Lighthouse, Minnesota Point ~ date unknown

Minnesota Point, also known as the Park Point neighborhood of Duluth, Minnesota, United States; is a long, narrow sand spit that extends out from the Canal Park tourist recreation-oriented district of the city of Duluth. The Point separates Lake Superior from Superior Bay and the Duluth Harbor Basin.

South Lake Avenue / Minnesota Avenue serves as a main route in the community.

Near the end of Minnesota Point is a small airport, Sky Harbor Airport. Beyond the airport, approximately 3/4 mile, is an old growth red and white pine forest. Within the forest is a Minnesota Department of Natural Resources designated area, the Minnesota Point Pine Forest Scientific and Natural Area, which encompasses 18 acres.

Minnesota Point is about 7 miles long, and when included with adjacent Wisconsin Point, which extends 3 miles out from the city of Superior, Wisconsin, totals 10 miles.

== History ==
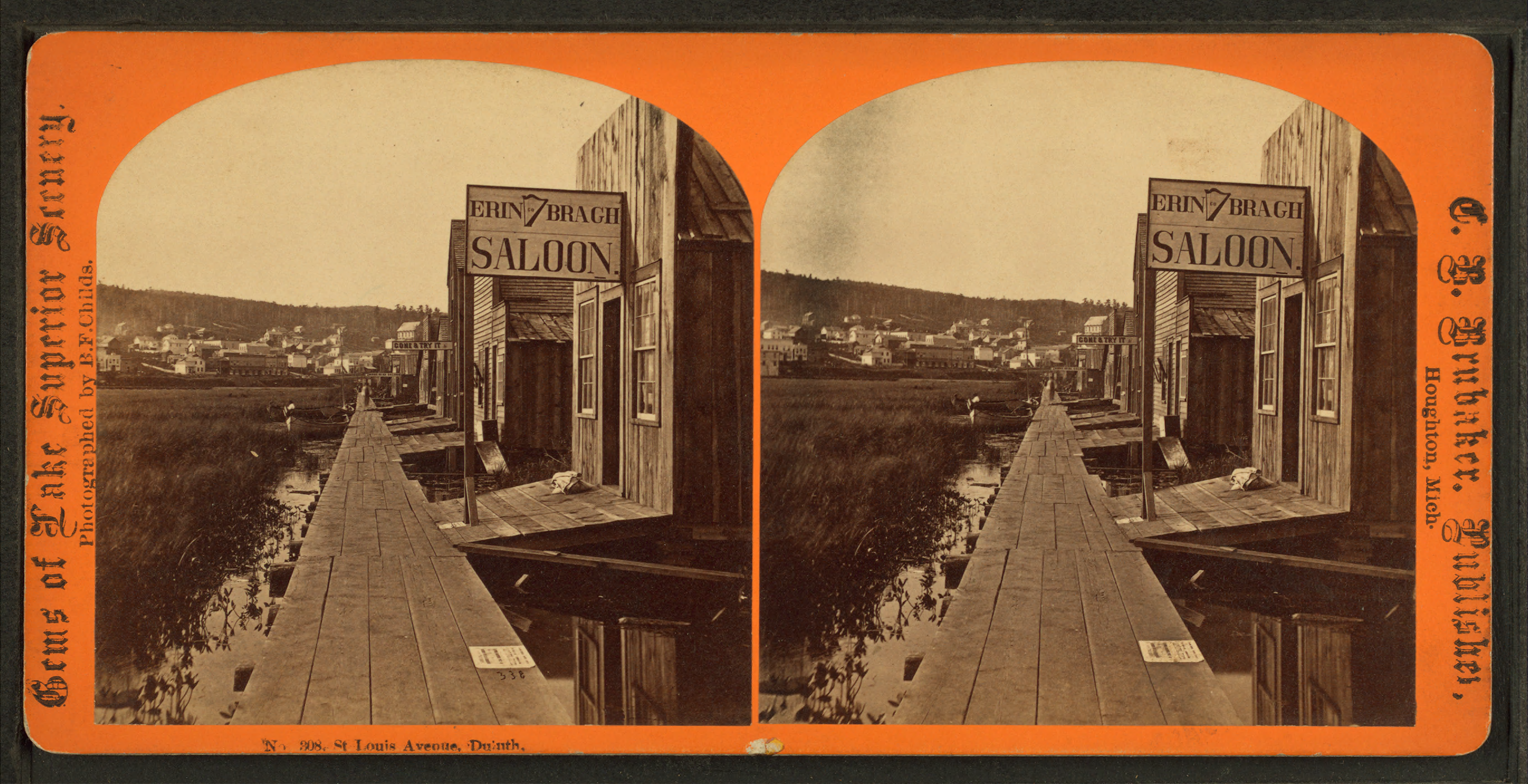
Stereoscopic view card of St. Louis Avenue, Minnesota Point ~ date unknown

Due to the short and easy portage across Minnesota Point, the Ojibwe name for the city of Duluth is Onigamiinsing ("at the little portage").

In the 1850s, the Saint Louis River was established as the border between neighboring states Minnesota and Wisconsin and the two ports, Duluth (Minnesota) and Superior (Wisconsin), became fierce economic competitors for shipping traffic off of Lake Superior. As commercial traffic on the lake increased with the completion of the Sault Ste Marie canal connecting Lake Superior to Lake Michigan, Congress appropriated the funds to build a lighthouse on the narrow opening in Minnesota Point, known as Superior Entry. The Minnesota Point Light, built between 1855 and 1858, was the first to use RH Barrett's Fifth Order Fresnel lamp and Barrett became the station's first lighthouse keeper, succeeded in 1861 by Samuel Stewart Palmer. Affectionately known as "The Old Standby", this lighthouse is now an abandoned ruin listed on the National Register of Historic Places.

Since the digging of the Duluth Ship Canal in 1870–1871, Minnesota Point is technically an island, connected to the rest of Duluth since 1905 by the Aerial Lift Bridge.

Beginning in 2023, North Shore LS LLC (managed by Kathy Cargill, member of the Cargill family) began purchasing and renovating properties located on Minnesota Point, owning twenty properties by March 2024. Cargill, in an interview with the Wall Street Journal stated that her intentions were to beautify and modernize the neighborhood, including building amenities such as a coffee shop and a complex for pickleball, basketball and street hockey. However, when residents, including Duluth mayor Roger Reinert, asked Cargill to provide details for her plans for Park Point, she did not respond. After local pushback, Cargill eventually cancelled her development plans, saying Reinert "peed in his Cheerios right there, and definitely I'm not going to do anything to benefit that community."

== Adjacent neighborhoods ==
- Canal Park and Downtown Duluth – to the immediate north

== See also ==
- Minnesota Point Light
- Wisconsin Point Light
- Wisconsin Point
