= Wisconsin Point =

Peninsula

Coordinates: 46°41′59″N 92°00′06″W

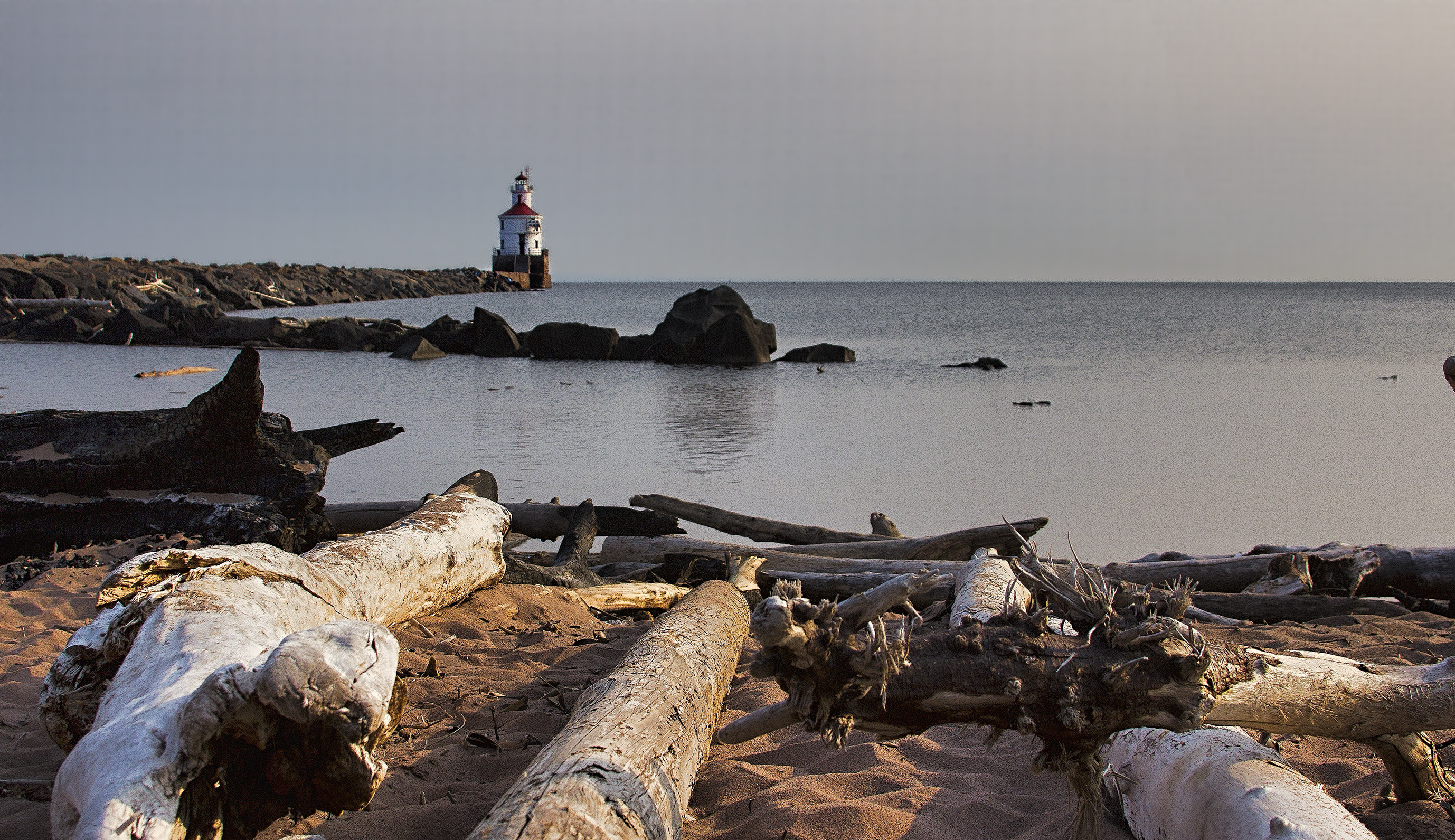
Wisconsin Point near Superior, Wisconsin

Wisconsin Point is a peninsula off the shore of Superior in Douglas County, Wisconsin, United States. 3 miles (4.8 km) in length, it is in the Lake Superior National Estuarine Research Reserve. The point is the world's largest freshwater bay mouth sand bar. The Wisconsin Point Lighthouse, built in 1913, is situated on the end of the peninsula. Wisconsin Point is owned and maintained by the city of Superior. Other features of Wisconsin Point include a Native American burial ground, extensive beaches and vistas of the city of Duluth, Minnesota, and a diverse forest and lagoon ecosystem. It is a well-known spot for birding during spring and fall migrations and ducks, shorebirds, gulls, hawks, and songbirds, such as warblers, finches, and sparrows, can be seen.

In 2019, Wisconsin Point was named as Best Strolling or Swimming Beach by Lake Superior Magazine.

== History of burial site ==
In the early 1600s, the Fond du Lac Band of Lake Superior Chippewa settled on Wisconsin Point. The area became a sacred site for the tribe, with generations of Ojibwe laid to rest there. The location was chosen not only for its natural beauty but also for its spiritual importance, with Lake Superior playing a central role in Ojibwe cosmology and cultural practices.

By the late 1660s, Jesuit missionary Claude Jean Allouez camped on the point, where he established a short-lived mission while ministering to the Ojibwe, marking the first point of contact for colonization of the land. By 1852, the local Ojibwe were set to be forcibly removed by the United States military from their land. Chief Joseph Osaugie and other Ojibwe leaders traveled to Washington, D.C., to oppose forced removal. Their efforts led to the 1854 treaty of La Pointe, which established reservations in northern Wisconsin and Minnesota. In 1882, Elphonsus Chror, a Franciscan missionary, was buried at Wisconsin Point. His remains were later removed in 1910.

In 1918, nearly 200 Ojibwe graves located near the end of the point were exhumed from Wisconsin Point to make way for a proposed U.S. Steel ore dock, which was never built. The remains were transported by barge and reburied in mass graves at St. Francis Cemetery in Superior. This led to significant cultural and emotional trauma for the Ojibwe people, as ancestral remains were moved without proper consultation or ceremony. In 1919 a stone was placed at the point commemorating the burial ground and noting its removal. Over the years, St. Francis Cemetery, which overlooks the Nemadji River, began to deteriorate. This led to further deterioration of the remains of the Ojibwe people.

In recent decades, there has been a resurgence of efforts to honor and protect these burial sites. The Fond du Lac Band of Lake Superior Chippewa and other indigenous groups have worked to reclaim the area, restore its sanctity, and educate the public about its importance. Ceremonies and memorials have been held to acknowledge the history and ensure respectful stewardship moving forward.

In 2022, A historic land transfer returned part of Wisconsin Point, including the burial grounds, to the Fond du Lac Band of Lake Superior Chippewa. The event was marked by a community celebration attended by tribal leaders and government officials. Today, Wisconsin Point is recognized not only as a natural landmark but also as a sacred indigenous site. It serves as a place of remembrance, cultural education, and environmental preservation. The burial grounds are protected, and visitors are encouraged to treat the area with respect, acknowledging its deep spiritual and historical roots.

== See also ==
- Minnesota Point
