= Two Harbors Light =

Two Harbors Lighthouse
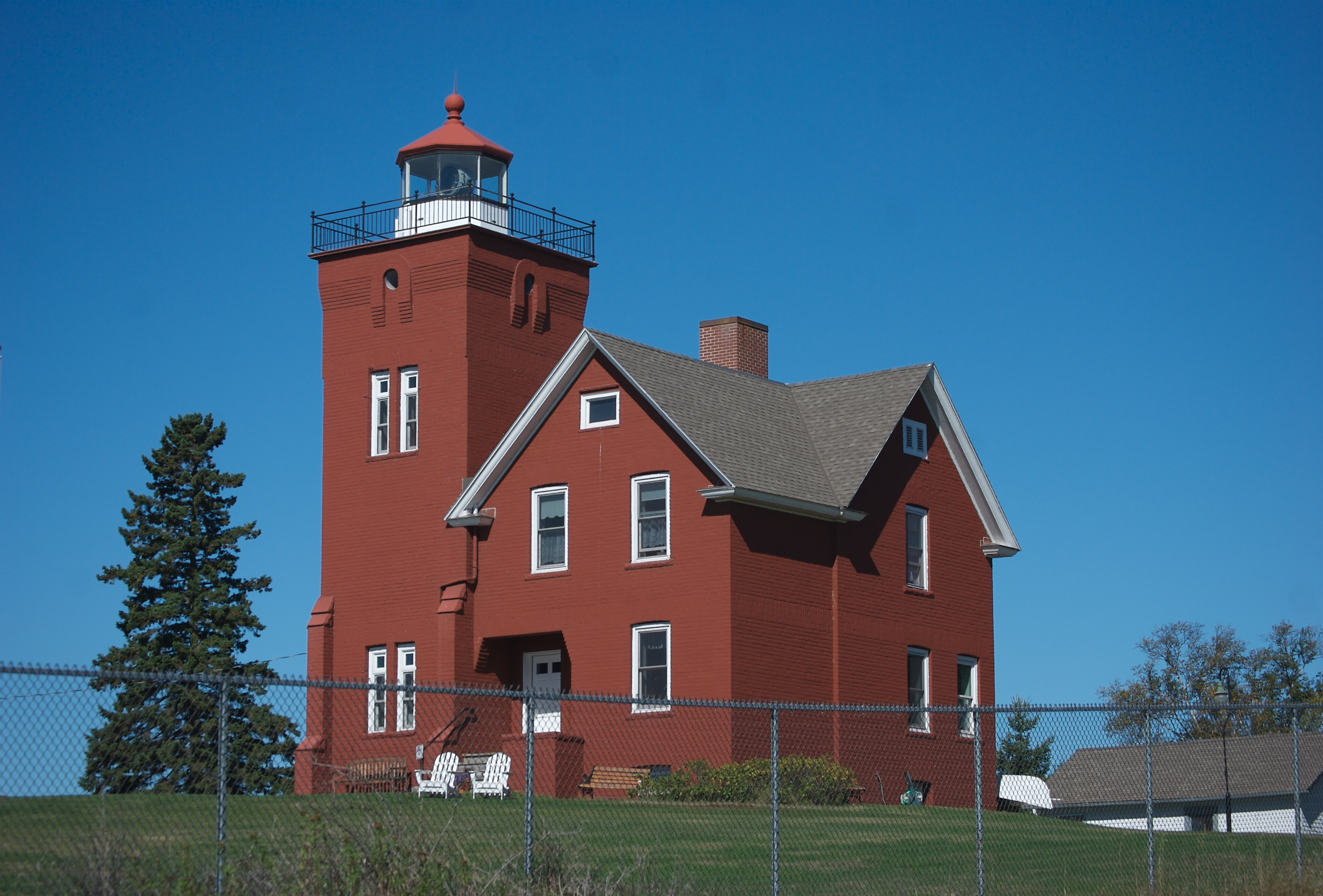
- Location: Two Harbors, Minnesota
- Coordinates: 47°0′50.33″N 91°39′48.52″W

Tower
- Constructed: 1892
- Foundation: Stone
- Construction: Red brick
- Automated: 1980
- Height: 49 feet (15 m)
- Shape: Square tower on dwelling, octagonal lantern
- Markings: Red dome and ventilator on white lantern
- Heritage: National Register of Historic Places listed place

Light
- First lit: 1892
- Focal height: 78 feet (24 m)
- Lens: Fourth order Fresnel lens (original), DCB-224 (replaced temporarily) ML-300 flashing beacon (current)
- Range: 17 nautical miles (31 km; 20 mi)
- Characteristic: Flashing white, 20 sec
- Two Harbors Light Station
- U.S. National Register of Historic Places
- MPS: U.S. Coast Guard Lighthouses and Light Stations on the Great Lakes TR
- NRHP reference No.: 84001483
- Added to NRHP: July 19, 1984

The Two Harbors Light is the oldest operating lighthouse in the US state of Minnesota. Overlooking Lake Superior's Agate Bay, the lighthouse is located in Two Harbors, Minnesota. The construction of the lighthouse began in 1891 and was completed the following year, with the light being lit for the first time on April 14, 1892. The first Two Harbors keeper was Charles Lederle and there were normally three keepers assigned to make sure the light was lit every day. The Lighthouse was built to provide safe passage into the Agate Bay Harbor during the early 20th century, as Two Harbors was a major shipping point for the iron ore of the Mesabi Range.

The 49.6-foot (15.1 m) tower is made of red brick and the head keeper's residence is attached; it towers 78 feet (24 m) from the lake level to the top and is 12 feet (3.7 m) squared. The walls of the tower were built to be three bricks thick and the walls where the tower and house meet are a full five bricks thick. This was for the safety of the keeper's family. The light has a total of six structures: a lighthouse tower with attached keeper's quarters, an assistant keeper's house, a fog signal building, an oil house, a skiff house, and a garage. The lighthouse was originally equipped with a fourth order Fresnel lens. The lighthouse is a twin of the Round Island Light in Michigan.

In 1969 the Coast Guard removed the Fresnel lens and replaced it with a 24 inches (610 mm) DCB-224 aerobeacon which is still used today. The light shines an average of 17 nautical miles (31 km; 20 mi). The original lens was loaned by the US Coast Guard to the National Museum of the Great Lakes. In early 2015, the lens was moved back to Two Harbors and is now on is now on display in the dining room of the Keeper's Quarters. On November 25, 2019, the DCB-224 aerobeacon failed causing the lighthouse to go dark. In summer of 2020, a temporary ML-300 LED flashing beacon was installed in the lighthouse until funds can be raised to restore the original beacon.

The Lake County Historical Society began to provide tours of the Lighthouse Station in 1988 when it was granted a lease by the U.S. Coast Guard. In 1999 ownership was transferred to the Lake County Historical Society and the Society assumed responsibility for the operation of the light in 2001. While the lighthouse is still on the Light List as active, it is listed as a private aid to navigation and is no longer maintained by the Coast Guard.

Three of the lighthouse station's buildings are open for visitors to tour:

- the Lighthouse Tower which has been restored and houses the rotating light
- the Assistant Keeper's building which has been restored to the late 19th century era and has exhibits about Lake Superior shipwrecks, the development of Agate Bay and a kiosk with historical information on the area
- the Keeper's Quarters of the Lighthouse have been restored to the early 20th century era which the Lake County Historical Society operates as a bed and breakfast.

Also on the site is the pilothouse from the Frontenac ore boat, which contains an exhibit on its history and shipwrecks. The lighthouse was listed on the National Register of Historic Places on July 19, 1984, as Two Harbors Light Station, reference number 84001483.
