= Duluth South Breakwater Outer Light =

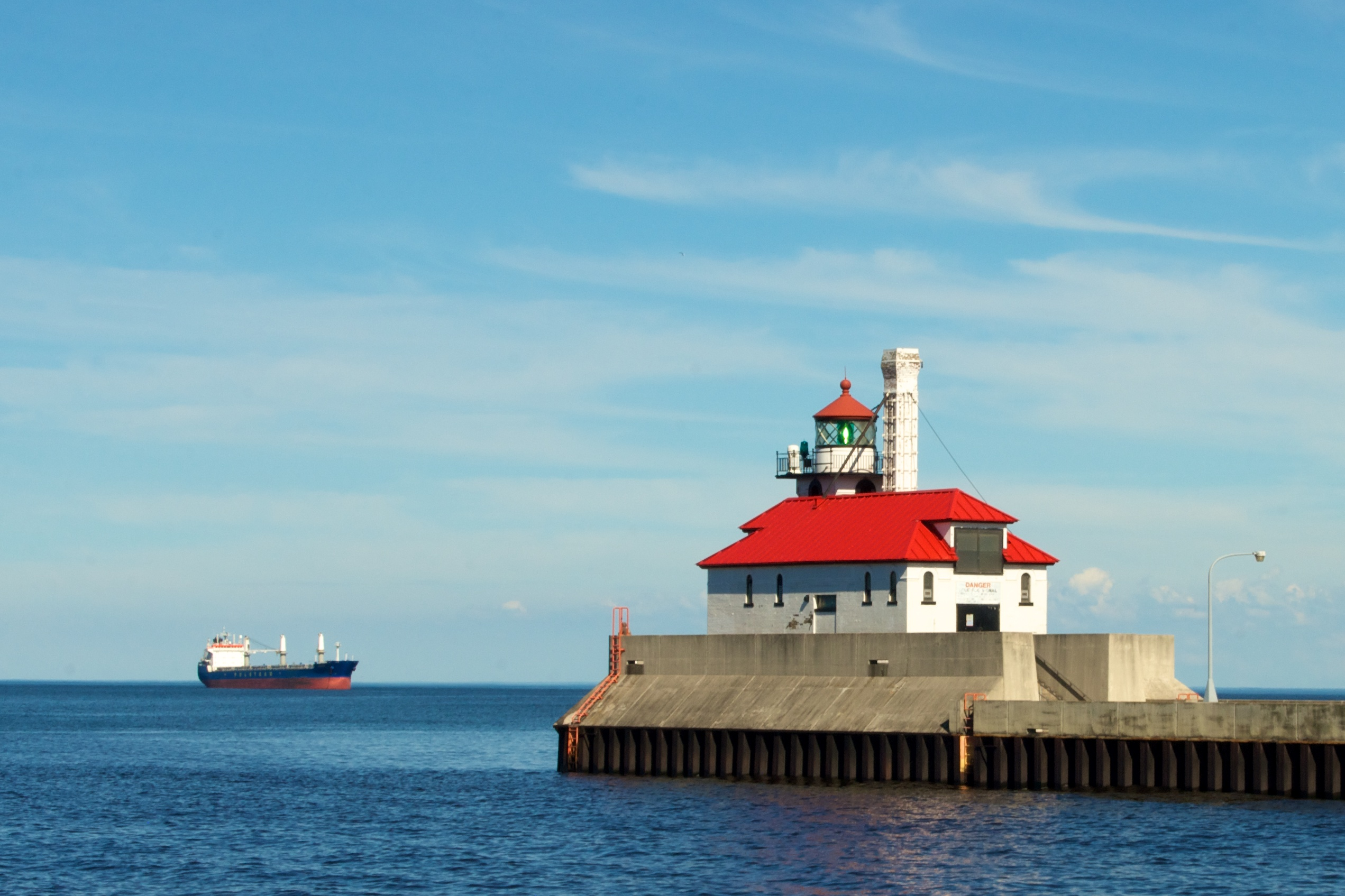
- The Duluth South Breakwater Outer Light from the northwest
- Location: Lake end of south breakwater of the Duluth Ship Canal, Duluth, Minnesota
- Coordinates: 46°46′48.3″N 92°5′16″W

Tower
- Constructed: 1874
- Foundation: Concrete pier
- Construction: Brick
- Automated: 1976
- Height: 10.5 m (34 ft)
- Shape: House with square tower
- Markings: White with red roof
- Heritage: National Register of Historic Places listed place
- Fog signal: Horn

Light
- First lit: 1901
- Focal height: 44 ft (13 m)
- Lens: Fourth order Fresnel lens
- Range: 13 nautical miles (24 km; 15 mi)
- Characteristic: Fixed Green
- Duluth Harbor South Breakwater Outer Light
- U.S. National Register of Historic Places
- Area: Less than one acre
- Architect: Office of the Superintendent of Lighthouses
- MPS: Light Stations of the United States MPS
- NRHP reference No.: 16000341
- Added to NRHP: June 7, 2016

The Duluth South Breakwater Outer Light is a lighthouse on the south breakwater of the Duluth Ship Canal in Duluth, Minnesota, United States. It forms a range with the Duluth South Breakwater Inner Light to guide ships into the canal from Lake Superior.

== History ==
The appropriation which paid for the initial construction of this light was made in 1870, with the intent to build a structure at the end of the Northern Pacific Railroad docks. Storm damage, however, delayed construction until 1872, by which point the canal had been dug. A wooden pyramidal tower was erected, initially equipped with a fifth-order Fresnel lens. An elevated walkway led back down the pier; a frame dwelling for the head keeper was constructed nearby, with the assistants required to look for lodging elsewhere in the city. This tower was first lit in 1874.

The area is notoriously foggy, and an automated bell taken from the South Manitou Island Light—the first in a long series of fog signals—was installed in 1880. This was replaced by a pair of steam-powered whistles in 1885, housed in a newly constructed shelter on the breakwater. The noise from these whistles brought complaints from city residents, so a parabolic reflector mounted in a sawdust-filled box was installed in a successful effort to direct the sound out towards the lake. Fog signal operation, it may be noted, averaged 472 hours a year for the first ten years of operation; in 1895 the whistles blew for 1,048 hours, an average of over four hours a day over the eight-month season.

In 1886 the lens was upgraded to a fourth-order Fresnel lens, and the characteristic changed from a red and white flash to a fixed red signal.

The late 1890s reconstruction of the ship canal resulted in the replacement of this tower and the fog signal house with a single brick lighthouse containing both signals. This house, constructed of Cream City brick, was completed in 1901, and the new tower was first lit on September 1 of that year. This tower stood on the southeast corner of the rectangular building, and housed the lens retained from the old light; the fog whistles and their reflector were also moved from the old structure to the new. The latter were replaced in 1915 with locomotive whistles, and in 1921 with Type F diaphones, setting off another round of noise complaints, which led to the installation of a new sound reflector. The diaphones were replaced in 1968 with an electronic horn, but in 1976 a group styling itself TOOT (for "reTurn Our Old Tone") began a campaign to restore the fog signal. Horns from the Kewaunee Pierhead Light were obtained, and in 1995 the diaphones were put back in service, eliciting, of course, a new round of noise complaints, which led to restriction of the signal to daytime operation. The signal required a three-phase current supply for operation, and when this failed in 2005, the Coast Guard refused to pay for repairs; legal concerns led the city to refuse to pick up the tab, and the signal was dismantled the following year. The light, however, continues in service, displaying a fixed green light.

The South Breakwater Outer Light was listed on the National Register of Historic Places in 2016 for its local significance in the themes of engineering, maritime history, and transportation. It was nominated for its association with federal efforts to establish nationwide navigational aids, and for being characteristic of early-20th-century harbor breakwater lights built around the Great Lakes.

== See also ==
- List of lighthouses in Minnesota
- National Register of Historic Places listings in St. Louis County, Minnesota
