= Two Harbors Breakwater Light =

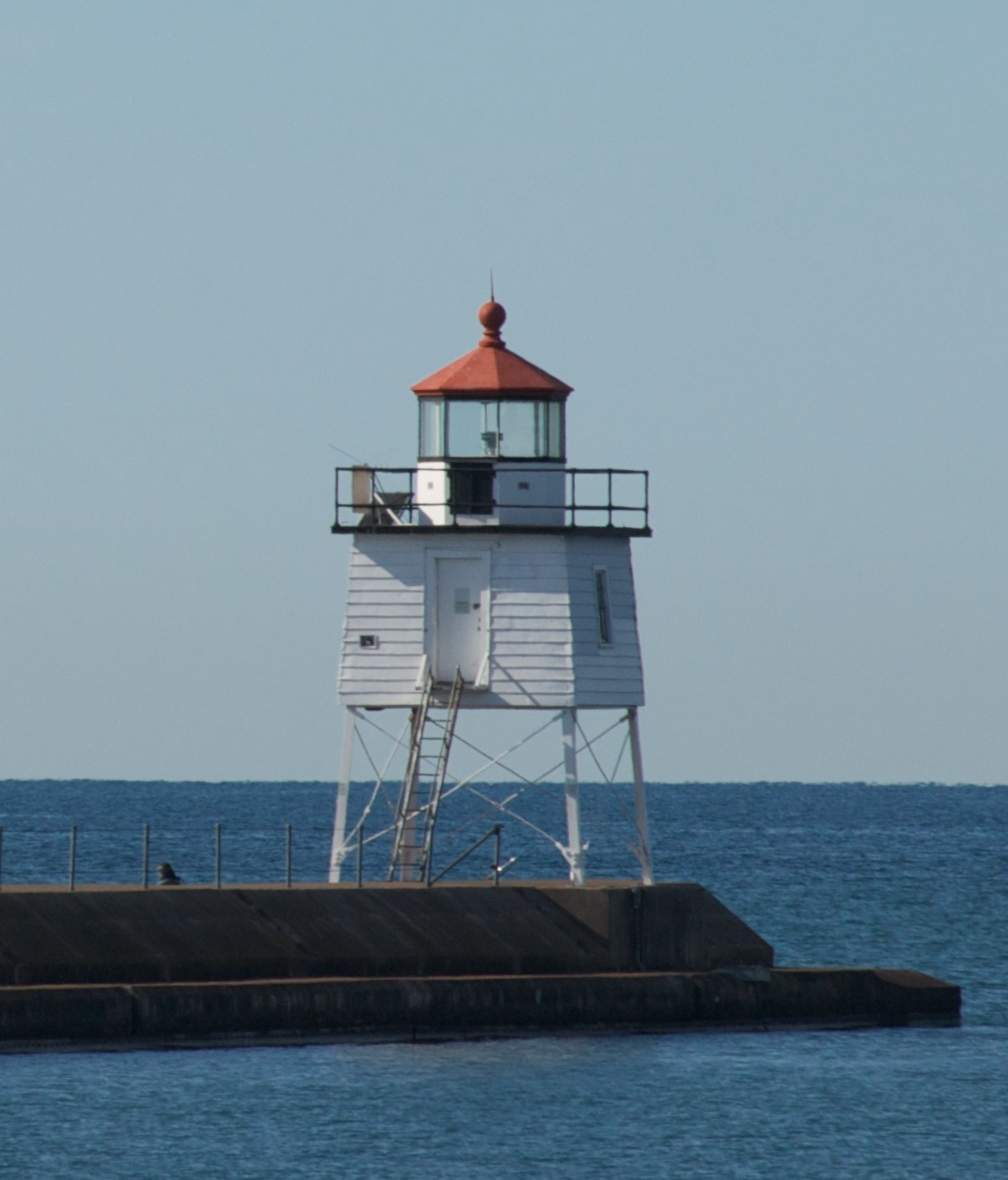
- Location: Two Harbors, Minnesota
- Coordinates: 47°0′38.19″N 91°40′10.10″W

Tower
- Constructed: 1906
- Foundation: Stone
- Construction: Iron/Wood
- Height: 7.5 m (25 ft)
- Shape: Square pyramidal skeleton tower with upper portion enclosed; octagonal lantern
- Markings: White house with red-roofed lantern
- Fog signal: Horn

Light
- First lit: 1906
- Focal height: 32 feet (9.8 m)
- Range: 9 nautical miles (17 km; 10 mi)
- Characteristic: Flashing red, 6 sec

The Two Harbors Breakwater Light is a lighthouse located at the end of the breakwater enclosing the eastern end of Agate Bay and defining the harbor at Two Harbors, Minnesota.

== History ==
A 1887 project to improve the harbor facilities resulted in the construction of a pair of breakwaters to better enclose the bay, one jutting out from either shore. The eastern of the two was marked by a lantern mounted on an iron post, which was first lit in 1895 and then moved to the end of the breakwater upon its completion in 1902. At the same time the lantern was replaced with a Pintsch gas lamp supplied from a pair of tanks on the breakwater.

Four years later, the lamp was replaced with the current tower. It is an iron skeletal tower with the top enclosed to for a watch room, and a typical octagonal lantern on top. The original fog signal was a clockwork-powered bell which was wound by an electric motor; both the motor and the lamp were powered from a powerhouse on shore. An electric siren replaced the bell and the lamp was changed from oil to electricity in 1915; the siren was replaced in turn by the present horn in 1941.

The light was discontinued for three years starting in 1947, when the breakwater was being extended; it resumed operation with the same structure and signals in 1950, and remains active today.
