= Superior Bay =

Bay in Wisconsin, United States

Coordinates: 46°43′56″N 092°03′59″W

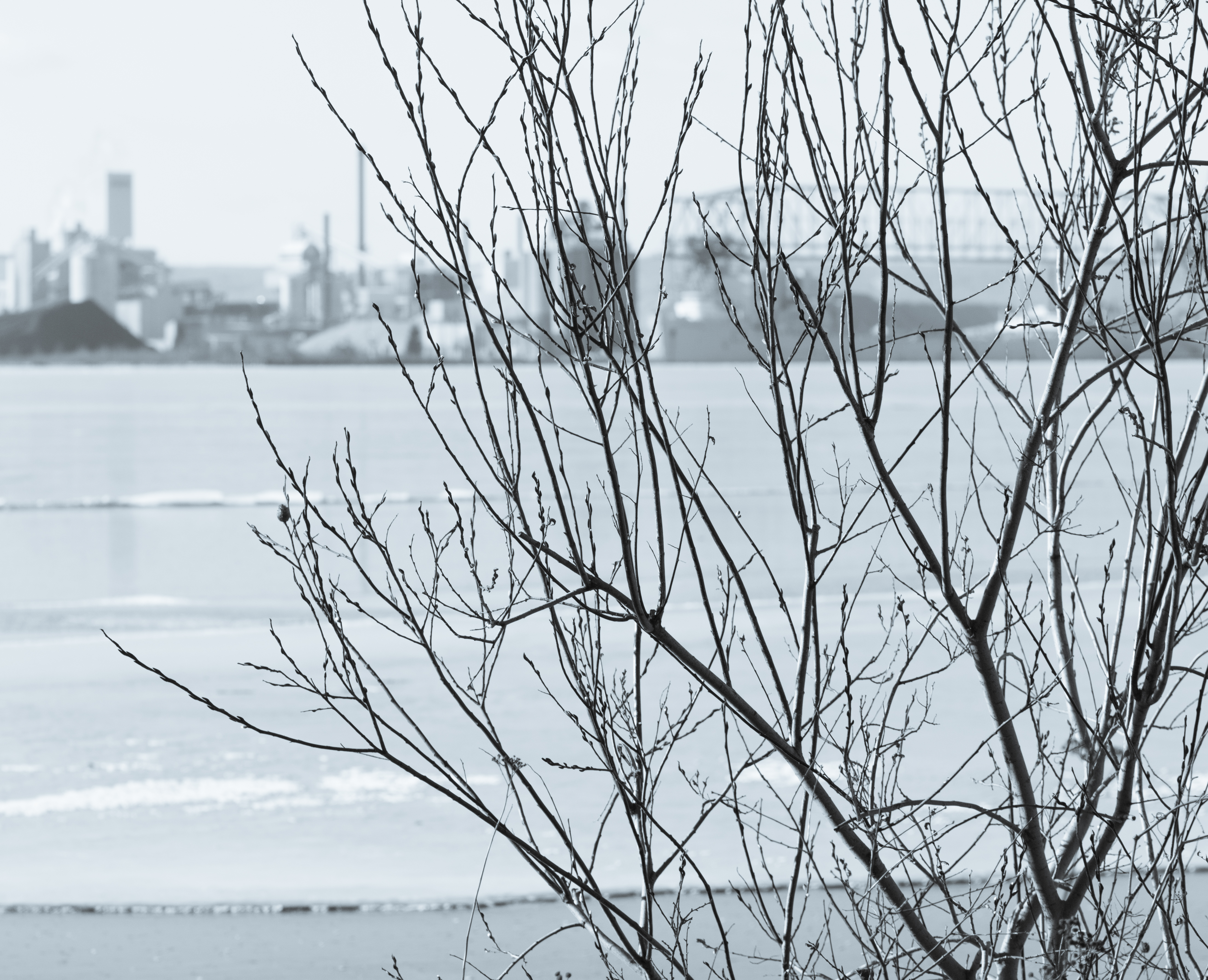
New Year's Eve at Park Point, Bay Side, Duluth, MN

Superior Bay is a narrow inlet of Lake Superior along the border of Minnesota and Wisconsin. It is seven miles (11 km) long and 0.5 miles (0.8 km) wide. A small strait connects it to the Saint Louis Bay to the west, into which the Saint Louis River empties. Superior Bay is located between the city of Superior and the Park Point neighborhood of Duluth. The Duluth Harbor Basin is nearby.
