= National Register of Historic Places listings in Voyageurs National Park =

This is a list of the National Register of Historic Places listings in Voyageurs National Park.

This is intended to be a complete list of the properties and districts on the National Register of Historic Places in Voyageurs National Park, Minnesota, United States. The locations of National Register properties and districts for which the latitude and longitude coordinates are included below, may be seen in an online map.

There are eleven properties and districts listed on the National Register in the park.

This National Park Service list is complete through NPS recent listings posted September 26, 2025.

== Current listings ==
	Name on the Register	Image	Date listed	Location	City or town	Description
1	Archaeological Site No. 21SL82	Archaeological Site No. 21SL82	February 17, 1988 (#88000067)	Address restricted	International Falls	Campsite used c. 3000 BCE–1900 CE.
2	Archeological Site 21SL141	Archeological Site 21SL141	December 31, 1987 (#87002164)	Address restricted	International Falls	Habitation site occupied c. 300–1900 CE.
3	Archeological Site 21SL35	Archeological Site 21SL35	December 29, 1987 (#87002165)	Address restricted	International Falls	Large beach site exclusively occupied by the Laurel complex of the early Woodland period, with what may be the earliest evidence of wild rice use in Minnesota. Also known as the Clyde Creek Site.
4	Archeological Site 21SL55	Archeological Site 21SL55	July 8, 1988 (#88000989)	Address restricted	International Falls	Island site exclusively occupied by the Blackduck culture of the late Woodland period, with a possible ricing jig and other subsurface features.
5	Archeological Site No. 21SL73	Archeological Site No. 21SL73	January 16, 1989 (#88003130)	Address restricted	International Falls	Seasonal campsite used 100 BCE–1500 CE.
6	Jun Fujita Cabin	Jun Fujita Cabin	December 2, 1996 (#96001351)	Wendt Island, Voyageurs National Park; 48°32′59″N 92°52′11″W	Ranier	1928 rustic cabin of Japanese American photographer and poet Jun Fujita. Also a rare surviving example of the early recreational development of the Boundary Waters.
7	Gold Mine Sites	Gold Mine Sites	May 6, 1977 (#77000155)	Around Rainy Lake in Voyageurs National Park; 48°36′09″N 93°10′05″W	Island View	District of seven scattered mine shafts and test pits from an 1894 gold rush that brought industry and settlement to the area.
8	William Ingersoll Estate	William Ingersoll Estate	June 15, 2011 (#11000360)	Ingersoll's Island; 48°21′16″N 92°28′23″W	Crane Lake vicinity	1920s island summer home complex, whose 1928 main cabin was a rare surviving E. F. Hodgson Company prefabricated kit house. Collapsed in 2014 and subsequently removed.
9	Kabetogama Ranger Station District	Kabetogama Ranger Station District	June 18, 1993 (#93000479)	Southwestern shore of Kabetogama Lake in Voyageurs National Park; 48°26′43″N 93°01′44″W	Kabetogama	Complex built 1933–1941 for the Minnesota Division of Forestry by the Civilian Conservation Corps, an example of federal work relief projects during the Great Depression and National Park Service rustic architecture.
10	Kettle Falls Historic District	Kettle Falls Historic District	July 17, 1978 (#78000376)	Kettle Channel in Voyageurs National Park; 48°30′05″N 92°38′25″W	Island View	Dam, two log buildings, and hotel built circa-1910–1914 at a key portage on the Canada–United States border, an isolated nexus of industry and tourism in the Boundary Waters wilderness.
11	Kettle Falls Hotel	Kettle Falls Hotel	January 11, 1976 (#76000210)	Kettle Channel in Voyageurs National Park; 48°30′11″N 92°38′23″W	Island View	1913 hotel built to provide lodging and meals to commercial fishermen, lumberjacks, buyers, and tourists at a key portage deep in a roadless area.
12	Adolph Levin Cottage		June 15, 2011 (#11000361)	Kabetogama Narrows near Ash River Maintenance Dock; 48°26′05″N 92°51′22″W	Voyageurs National Park	Representative early-20th-century lake retreat with a 1937 log cabin noted for its rustic architecture and traditional Finnish construction.
13	Little American Mine	Little American Mine	April 16, 1975 (#75000226)	Little American Island in Voyageurs National Park; 48°36′09″N 93°10′05″W	Island View	Remnants from Minnesota's only profitable gold mine, in operation 1893–1898. Now developed with an interpretive trail.
14	Monson's Hoist Bay Resort	Monson's Hoist Bay Resort	June 15, 2011 (#11000362)	Hoist Bay, Namakan Lake; 48°25′05″N 92°44′55″W	Voyageurs National Park	Family-owned resort established in 1939 to serve the growing phenomenon of middle-class tourists, with nine contributing properties built 1941–1968.
15	I.W. Stevens Lakeside Cottage	I.W. Stevens Lakeside Cottage	June 15, 2011 (#11000363)	Williams Island, Namakan Lake; 48°26′30″N 92°44′50″W	Voyageurs National Park	Largely intact lake cabin complex established in 1932, with seven contributing properties; used as a year-round residence and a small-scale resort.

== See also ==
- National Register of Historic Places listings in St. Louis County, Minnesota
- National Register of Historic Places listings in Koochiching County, Minnesota
- National Register of Historic Places listings in Minnesota
