= William Ingersoll Estate =

Historic house in Minnesota, United States

- U.S. National Register of Historic Places
- U.S. Historic district
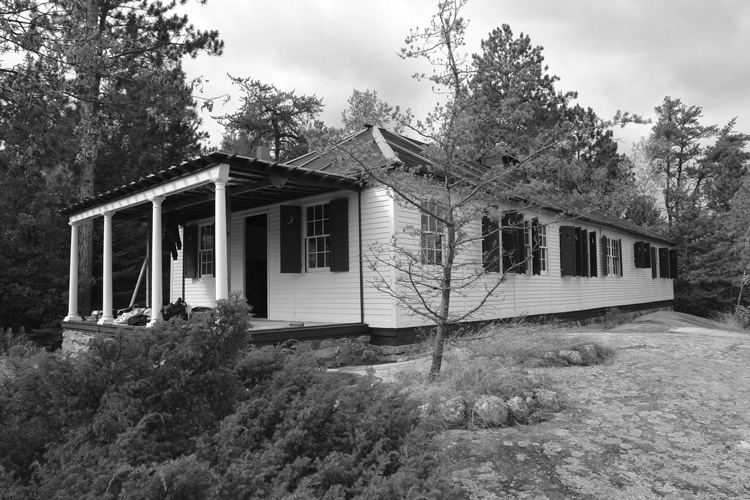
- The main cabin of the William Ingersoll Estate

- Location within Minnesota Location within the United States
- Location: Ingersoll's Island, Crane Lake, Minnesota
- Coordinates: 48°21′16″N 92°28′23″W
- Area: 7.58 acres (3.07 ha)
- Built: 1928–1962
- Architect: E. F. Hodgson Company
- MPS: Tourism and Recreational Properties in Voyageurs National Park 1880–1950 MPS
- NRHP reference No.: 11000360
- Added to NRHP: June 15, 2011

The William Ingersoll Estate is a former summer home complex on an island in Sand Point Lake in the U.S. state of Minnesota, in what is now Voyageurs National Park. William P. Ingersoll (1885–1973) was a wealthy philanthropist from Canton, Illinois. He purchased the island property in 1927, when the Boundary Waters region had become a wilderness vacation destination for adventurous upper-class Midwesterners. The following year he installed a mail-order cabin from the E. F. Hodgson Company of Massachusetts, which specialized in prefabricated buildings. Ingersoll usually spent four months of the year on his island and continued to develop the property until he sold it in 1962 at the age of 77. In 2011 the estate was listed on the National Register of Historic Places for its local significance in the themes of architecture and entertainment/recreation. It was nominated as an example of the area's upper-class summer homes and as a rare intact example of a E. F. Hodgson Company kit house.

The main cabin collapsed in 2014 and was subsequently removed by the National Park Service, with the hope of reconstructing it if funding ever became available.

== Description ==
The National Park Service categorized the Ingersoll Estate as a historic district with six contributing properties. The first was the 1928 main cabin, which has now collapsed and been removed. The second is another prefabricated cabin with six rooms, built for Ingersoll's friend and frequent guest Robert B. Chiperfield, a long-serving congressman from Canton. Third and fourth are a generator shed built circa 1952 and a boathouse. Fifth is a workshop and storage shed with additions for an icehouse, sauna, and fish cleaning station. The sixth contributing property is the cultural landscape itself, which comprises garden beds, stone paths, fencing, a bird house, and the careful siting of the buildings to maximize lake views and maintain privacy.

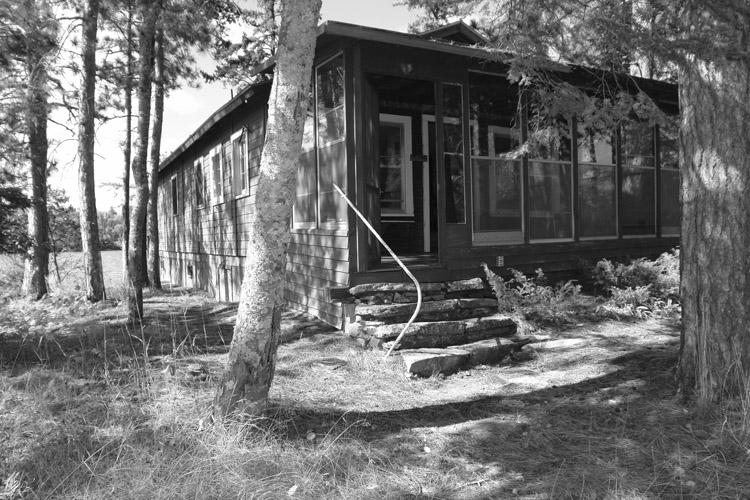
The Chiperfield Cabin

== See also ==
- National Register of Historic Places listings in St. Louis County, Minnesota
- National Register of Historic Places listings in Voyageurs National Park
