= Adolph Levin Cottage =

Historic house in Minnesota, United States

- U.S. National Register of Historic Places
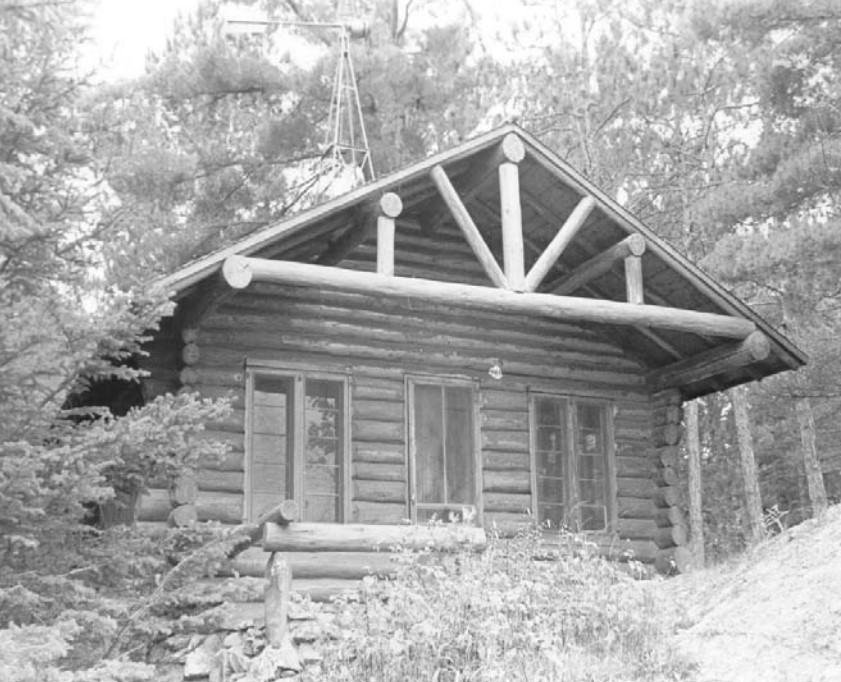
- 1989 photo by Mary Graves, National Park Service

- Location within Minnesota Location within the United States
- Location: Kabetogama Narrows near the Ash River Maintenance Dock, St. Louis County, Minnesota
- Coordinates: 48°26′5″N 92°51′22″W
- Area: .664 acres (2,690 m^{2})
- Built: 1937
- Architect: Ted Mead, Utti Huttunen, Ahti Hujanen, & Louis Nelson
- Architectural style: Rustic
- MPS: Tourism and Recreational Properties in Voyageurs National Park 1880–1950 MPS
- NRHP reference No.: 11000361
- Added to NRHP: June 15, 2011

The Adolph Levin Cottage, also called the Levin Cabin, is a historic vacation property on Kabetogama Lake in St. Louis County, Minnesota, United States. It contains a log cabin built in 1937 for two friends, Dr. Adolph Levin and George Plager. A metal water tank and the surrounding landscape are also contributing historic features. It is now preserved within Voyageurs National Park as an example of the early tourism and recreational properties in the area. In 2011 the property was listed on the National Register of Historic Places for its significance in the themes of architecture and entertainment/recreation. It was nominated for being a representative early-20th-century lake retreat, and for the rustic architecture and traditional Finnish construction of the cabin.

== See also ==
- Jun Fujita Cabin
- National Register of Historic Places listings in St. Louis County, Minnesota
- National Register of Historic Places listings in Voyageurs National Park
