= Kabetogama Ranger Station District =

Historic district in Minnesota, United States

- U.S. National Register of Historic Places
- U.S. Historic district
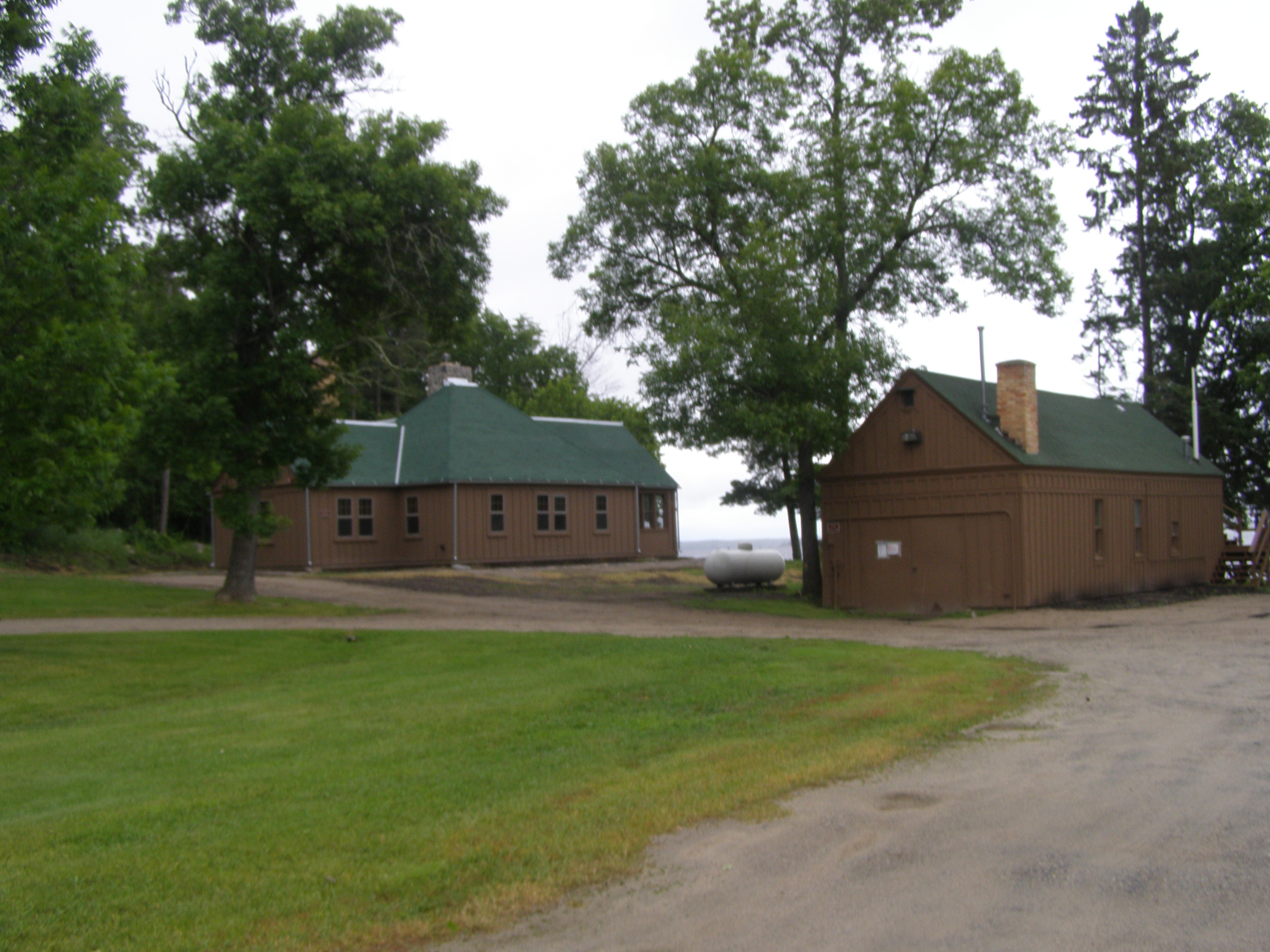
- Historic buildings in the Kabetogama Ranger Station District

- Location within Minnesota Location within the United States
- Location: Southwestern shore of Kabetogama Lake in Voyageurs National Park
- Coordinates: 48°26′43″N 93°1′44″W
- Area: 16.7 acres (6.8 ha)
- Built: 1933–1941
- Architect: Fred P. Wolff, Civilian Conservation Corps
- Architectural style: National Park Service rustic
- MPS: Federal Relief Construction in Minnesota, 1933–1941
- NRHP reference No.: 93000479
- Added to NRHP: June 18, 1993

The Kabetogama Ranger Station District is a historic ranger station complex in Kabetogama, Minnesota, United States. It was built from 1933 to 1941 by the Civilian Conservation Corps (CCC) as an administrative center for Kabetogama State Forest, managed by the Minnesota Department of Natural Resources. Following the establishment of Voyageurs National Park in the 1970s, the Minnesota government finalized the donation of the property to the National Park Service (NPS) in 1987. The NPS continues to use the property as one of the four administrative and visitor entrances to Voyageurs.

The Kabetogama Ranger Station District contains 10 contributing properties: six buildings (a 1921 patrol cabin, 1935 ranger station/residence, 1935 warehouse, 1936 boathouse, 1936 oilhouse, and a 1937 privy), three structures (a 1933 retaining wall, circa-1936 tramway, and 1936 breakwater and moorage basin), and one site (the circular road system, laid down around 1935). The current Kabetogama Lake Visitor Center was built in 1988 and is considered a non-contributing property to the historic district.

In 1993, the district was listed on the National Register of Historic Places for its local significance in the themes of architecture, conservation, landscape architecture, and social history. It was nominated for representing the construction and conservation projects of the CCC during the Great Depression, which provided immediate economic benefits and a lasting legacy embodied in distinctive National Park Service rustic architecture.

== See also ==
- National Register of Historic Places listings in St. Louis County, Minnesota
- National Register of Historic Places listings in Voyageurs National Park
