= Dove Island =

Dove Island may refer to:

- Dove Island (Canada), Nunavut Canada
- Dove Island (British Columbia), Canada
  - Dove Island Indian Reserve No. 12, an Indian reserve comprising that island
- Dove Island (Guangzhou), an English naming for Guanzhou Island in Guangzhou, Guangdong Province, China. Naming by UK Government.
- Dove Island (Saint Vincent and the Grenadines)
- Dove Island, Minnesota, an island in Rainy Lake, home to the community of Island View
- Dove Island (Western Australia)
