= Crane Lake Township, St. Louis County, Minnesota =

Human settlement in the United States

Crane Lake Township, Minnesota
- Township
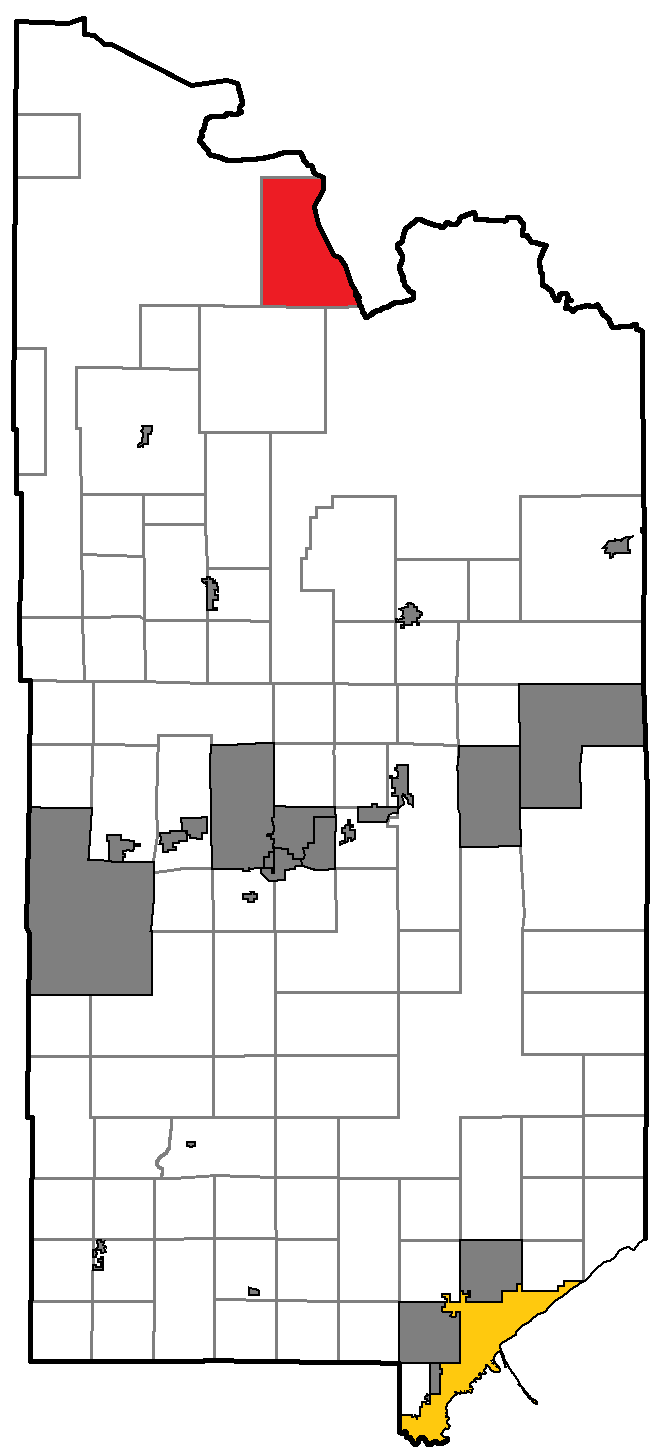
- Location of Crane Lake Township within St. Louis County, Minnesota
- Coordinates: 48°16′00″N 92°29′19″W
- Country: United States
- State: Minnesota
- County: St. Louis

Area
  - Total: 83.47 sq mi (216.2 km^{2})
  - Land: 69.21 sq mi (179.3 km^{2})
  - Water: 14.25 sq mi (36.9 km^{2})

Population (2020)
  - Total: 98
  - Density: 1.4/sq mi (0.55/km^{2})
- Time zone: UTC-6 (Central (CST))
  - Summer (DST): UTC-5 (CDT)
- Area code: 218
- GNIS feature ID: 1986987

Crane Lake Township is a township in Saint Louis County, Minnesota, United States. The township was organized on June 18, 2002. It had a population of 98 at the 2020 census.

Saint Louis County Road 24 serves as a main route in the township. The unincorporated community of Crane Lake is located within Crane Lake Township.

The community is notable for being the southern entry to Voyageurs National Park. Crane Lake is also a western entry to the Boundary Waters Canoe Area Wilderness and an entry into Canada.

Crane Lake is mostly a resort and recreational area. It is known for walleye and smallmouth bass fishing. Having access to Sand Point Lake, Namakan, Loon, Lac La Croix, Ash River and Kabetogama makes this a large chain of lakes.

Historical population
| Census | Pop. | Note | %± |
|---|---|---|---|
| 2010 | 82 | | — |
| 2020 | 98 | | 19.5% |

== Media ==
The official newspaper of Crane Lake Township is The Timberjay. The Timberjay is published weekly, with a circulation of over 1000.
