= Kettle Falls Hotel =

- U.S. National Register of Historic Places
- U.S. Historic district – Contributing property
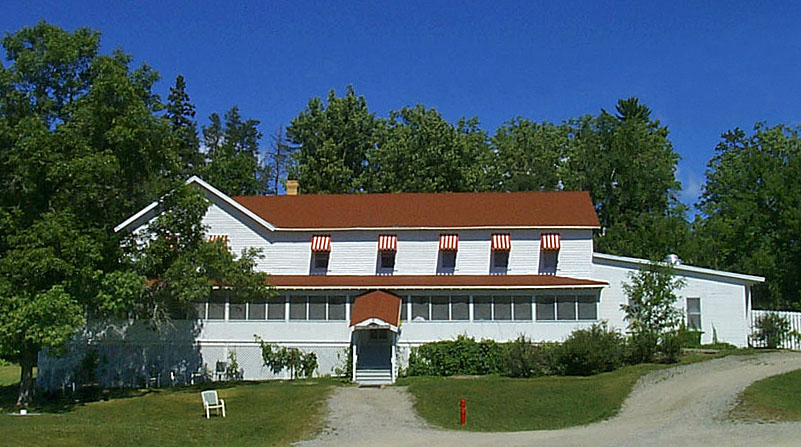
- The Kettle Falls Hotel viewed from the south

- Location within Minnesota Location within the United States
- Location: Kettle Channel in Voyageurs National Park
- Coordinates: 48°30′10.5″N 92°38′23.5″W
- Area: 8 acres (3.2 ha)
- Built: 1913
- Architect: Ed Rose
- Part of: Kettle Falls Historic District (ID78000376)
- NRHP reference No.: 76000210

Significant dates
- Added to NRHP: January 11, 1976
- Designated CP: July 17, 1978

The Kettle Falls Hotel is a historic hotel in what is now Voyageurs National Park in the U.S. state of Minnesota. It opened in 1913 deep in the wilderness of the Boundary Waters, at the juncture of Namakan and Rainy Lakes. Today it is the only lodging operating inside the park, and remains accessible only by water.

In 1976 the hotel was listed on the National Register of Historic Places for its state-level significance in the themes of commerce, entertainment/recreation, industry, and transportation. It was nominated for its long history of providing lodging and refreshment to fishermen, lumberjacks, traders, and tourists at a key portage deep in a roadless area. Two years later the hotel was included as a contributing property to the Kettle Falls Historic District.

== History ==
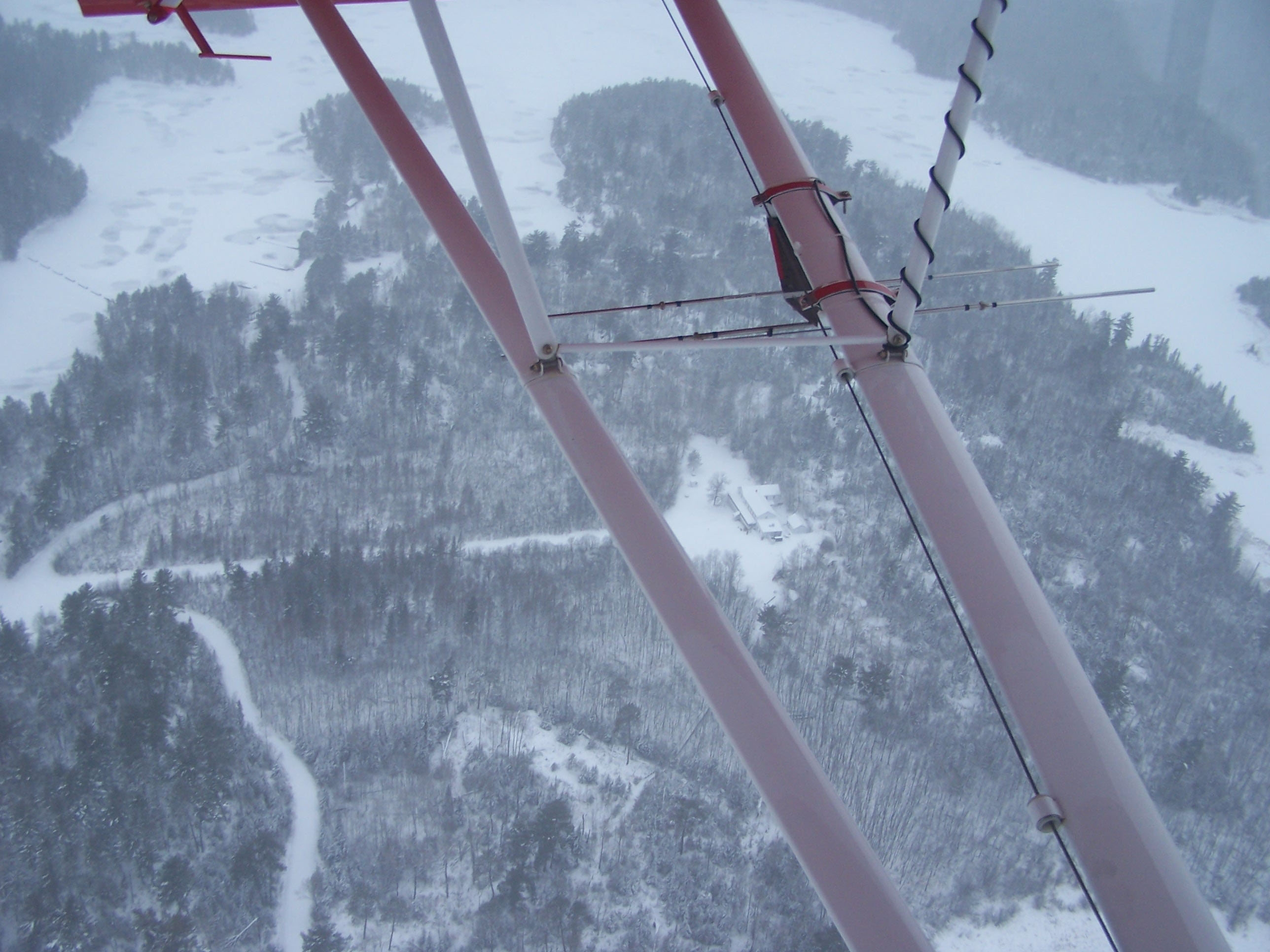
Aerial view of Kettle Falls hotel taken in early winter

The site was first patented as a homestead in 1910 by Ida May Winslow. The property passed to Minneapolis surgeon Frederick A. Dunsmoor, who in turn sold the land to William E. "Big Ed" Rose, a timberman, in 1913. Rose is reputed to have built the north–south wing of the hotel in 1913. Rose sold his Kettle Falls holdings to Robert Sloan Williams in 1918 for $1,000 (equivalent to $21,405 in 2025) and four barrels of whiskey. Williams operated a hotel and nightclub in Ranier, Minnesota, with the Kettle Falls Hotel as a sideline. Williams had a number of run-ins with the law, charged with selling illegal whiskey in Ranier and Kettle Falls, and later operated stills and a smuggling operation. The hotel was electrified by 1935. An annex, called the "big house", was built behind the hotel in 1946. Bob Williams died in 1956; his widow Lil and step-son Charlie and his wife Blanche continued to run the hotel. Lil Williams died in 1961. The National Park Service acquired the hotel from the Williams family, who continued to operate it, in 1976. The hotel was extensively renovated in 1986-87.

== See also ==
- National Register of Historic Places listings in St. Louis County, Minnesota
- National Register of Historic Places listings in Voyageurs National Park
