= Blackstone Lake, Ontario =

Lake in Ontario, Canada

Coordinates: 45°13′53″N 79°53′1″W

Blackstone Lake, in The Archipelago of the Parry Sound district in Ontario, Canada. The lake is primarily a small, boat-access lake containing nine islands, approximately three and a half miles long, and about two miles wide when the northwestern and southeastern bays are included.

A large portion of the land surrounding the lake, as well as the lake's beautiful islands, are privately owned, although a good section of the western lake property along the lower edge of the lake has been established as part of a preservation trust and will remain uninhabited. Strict water-vessel enforcement keeps the water potable, and water quality assessments are conducted several times each year. Avid canoers can travel through the river, traverse Crane Lake, and reach the open waters of the Georgian Bay about nine miles later.
