= Jun Fujita Cabin =

Historic house in Minnesota, United States

- U.S. National Register of Historic Places
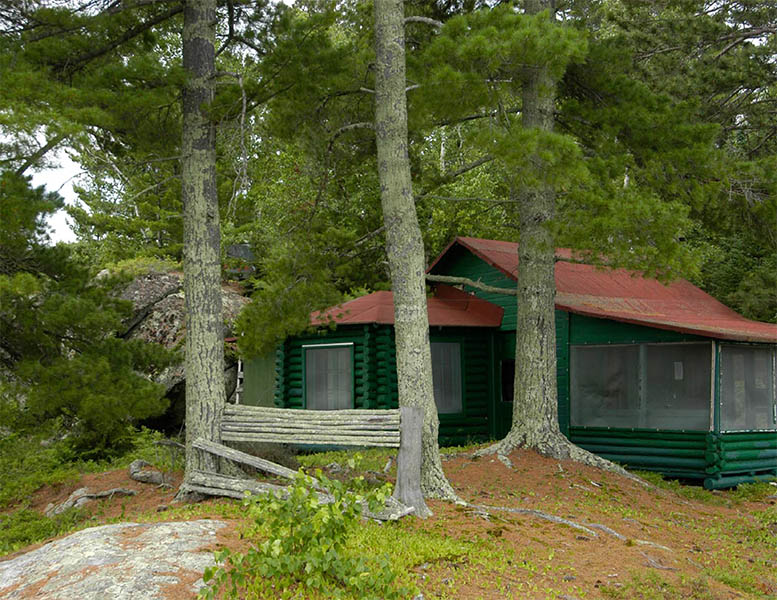
- The Jun Fujita Cabin from the east

- Location within Minnesota Location within the United States
- Location: Wendt Island, Rainy Lake
- Nearest city: Ranier, Minnesota
- Coordinates: 48°32′59″N 92°52′11″W
- Area: 4 acres (1.6 ha)
- Built: 1928
- Architect: Jun Fujita
- Architectural style: Single pen cabin
- NRHP reference No.: 96001351
- Added to NRHP: December 2, 1996

The Jun Fujita Cabin is a historic summer cabin in the U.S. state of Minnesota, owned by photographer and poet Jun Fujita (1888–1963). He built it in 1928 on an island in Rainy Lake, an area of the Boundary Waters that later became Voyageurs National Park. The cabin was listed on the National Register of Historic Places in 1996 for its local significance in the themes of art, Asian ethnic heritage, and entertainment/recreation. It was nominated for its association with Fujita, one of the first Japanese Americans to gain prominence in the American Midwest, and as a rare surviving example of the early recreational development of the Boundary Waters.

== History ==
Fujita was born in Hiroshima in 1888 and immigrated to Canada as a teenager. He spent a time as a photographer for a Japanese publication, then moved to Chicago and started working for the Chicago Evening Post, which later became the Chicago Daily News. His photographic career included the 1915 sinking of the SS Eastland, the Chicago Race Riot of 1919, and the 1929 Saint Valentine's Day Massacre. In the 1930s he left photojournalism and established a commercial photography studio on Harper Street. Some of his clients included Johnson Outboards, Stark Nurseries, and Sears, Roebuck and Co. Fujita completed some of his photography for Johnson Outboards on Rainy Lake, on the border of the United States and Canada.

Fujita's long-term companion, Florence Carr, bought a four-acre (1.6 ha) island on Rainy Lake around 1928. Carr and Fujita had met each other and begun living together in the early or mid-1920s, but did not marry until 1940 due to the Expatriation Act of 1907, which would have stripped Carr of her citizenship . The island was purchased in Carr's name because Minnesota state laws restricted land ownership by non-citizens. Despite her ownership of the island, neighbors never recalled meeting Carr and remember Fujita as the sole occupant of the island. The island was called "Jap Island" by locals, but is now known as Wendt Island.

This area of Minnesota was developing into a vacation spot around the time, having become accessible when railroads reached International Falls, Minnesota, and neighbouring Fort Frances, Ontario, around 1908. Highways to the area were built from Duluth, Baudette, and Bemidji by 1922. The area was still rather remote, since Duluth, the nearest large town, was 150 miles (240 km) away. The Rainy Lake area was popular with visitors who wanted to fish, hunt, or simply enjoy the wilderness. Some less-reputable recreational pursuits were also enjoyed by the locals, such as gambling, moonshining, prostitution, and other vice. The authorities of International Falls, Ranier, and Kettle Falls apparently tolerated this vice, though it started tailing off during the 1930s.

Fujita started building his cabin with a 13-by-16-foot (4.0 by 4.9 m) structure framed with cedar poles and covered in drop siding. He later added a screened porch with a shed roof on the north side, as well as a log addition measuring seven by eight feet (2.1 by 2.4 m) on the east side. The floor in that room is slightly higher than the rest of the cabin, suggesting that it could have been a shrine. The cabin fits well into its surroundings of large rocks, pine trees, and wildflowers. Some of the architectural design reflects Japanese construction practices, such as modest decoration and a foundation of dry-laid stones.

Although he still had privacy on the island, Fujita gradually stopped visiting the island during the years of World War II. This could have been because of its distance from Chicago and the anti-Japanese prejudices during the war. He allowed Fred and Edythe Sackett, owners of a nearby island, to use his cabin from the early 1940s, although he did not sell the cabin to them until 1956. The Sacketts added a bedroom on the south side and added some propane-powered appliances. In 1973 the Sacketts sold the property to Charles and Mary Jane Wendt, their friends from the Rapid City, South Dakota, area. In 1985 the cabin and land were acquired by Voyageurs National Park, although the Wendts still lease the cabin.

== See also ==
- National Register of Historic Places listings in St. Louis County, Minnesota
- National Register of Historic Places listings in Voyageurs National Park
