= Kettle Falls Historic District =

Historic district in Minnesota, United States

- U.S. National Register of Historic Places
- U.S. Historic district
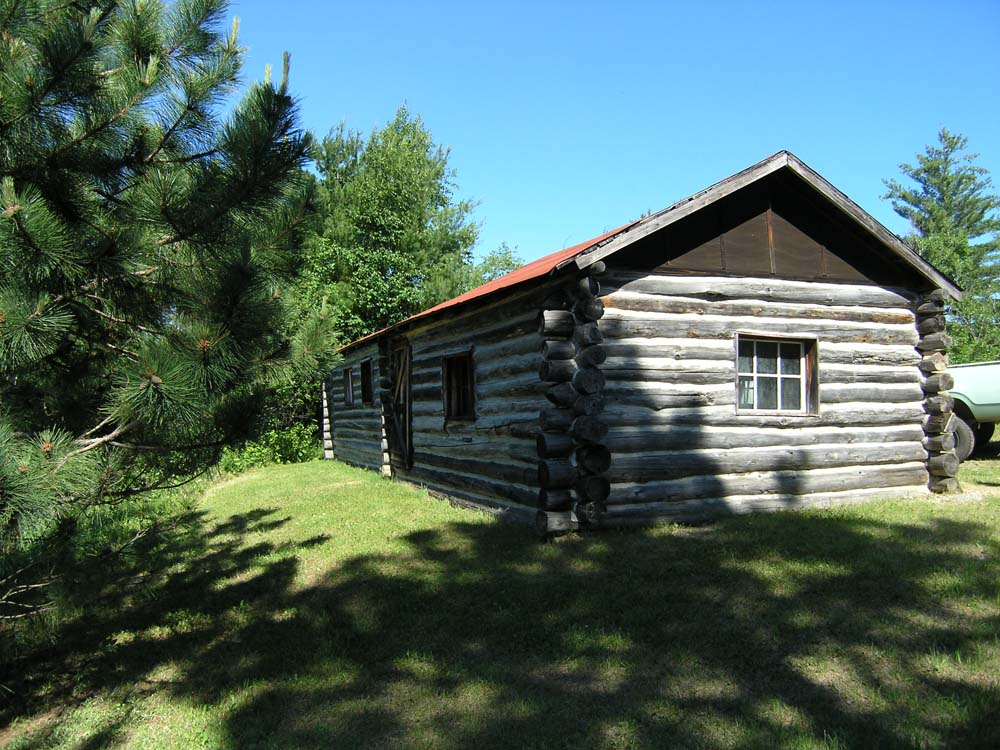
- The Dam Keeper's Cabin in the Kettle Falls Historic District

- Location within Minnesota Location within the United States
- Location: Kettle Channel in Voyageurs National Park
- Coordinates: 48°30′5″N 92°38′25″W
- Area: 29 acres (12 ha)
- Built: c. 1910–1914
- NRHP reference No.: 78000376
- Added to NRHP: July 17, 1978

The Kettle Falls Historic District encompasses a remote pocket of early-20th-century industrial and commercial activity deep in the Boundary Waters, in what is now Voyageurs National Park in the U.S. state of Minnesota. Kettle Falls is the outlet from Namakan Lake into Rainy Lake on the Canada–United States border. The portage between the two lakes served as a key gathering point from the time of the voyageurs to the miners, commercial fishermen, and lumbermen at the turn of the 20th century, and tourists beginning in the 1930s. The Kettle Falls Dam was built at the site between 1910 and 1914, and two log buildings associated with its construction remain standing. The fourth contributing property to the historic district is the Kettle Falls Hotel, built in 1913.

In 1978 the Kettle Falls Historic District was listed on the National Register of Historic Places for its local significance in the themes of commerce, engineering, industry, and transportation. It was nominated for its history as an isolated nexus of industry and tourism in the Boundary Waters wilderness.

== History ==
The portage, initially known as the portage de Chaudière or the portage neuf, was frequented by the fur trading voyageurs, following an established trail that later became the path of the Canada–U.S. border. An 1890s gold rush brought miners through the area. Illegal liquor was smuggled over the border from Canada starting about 1910. The Kettle Falls area was later used by fishermen and lumbermen, with commercial fish camps operating 1913–1920. In the 1930s lumbering operations were the chief activity.

The dam is about 20 feet (6.1 m) high, with four sluiceways, divided into a section called the American Dam and another on the Canadian channel called the International Dam. It featured fish ladders, though they are no longer operational.

== See also ==
- National Register of Historic Places listings in St. Louis County, Minnesota
- National Register of Historic Places listings in Voyageurs National Park
