= Crane Lake =

Crane Lake may refer to:

- Crane Lake (Alberta), a lake in Bonnyville No. 87, Alberta, Canada
- Crane Lake, Saskatchewan
- Crane Lake Township, St. Louis County, Minnesota, a township in northern Minnesota, United States
  - Crane Lake, Minnesota, an unincorporated community within the township
