= William Ingersoll =

William Ingersoll may refer to:

- William Ingersoll (actor) (1860–1936), American actor
- William P. Ingersoll (philanthropist) (1885–1973), American philanthropist, owner of the William Ingersoll Estate
