= Monson's Hoist Bay Resort =

Historic resort in northern Minnesota, United States

- U.S. National Register of Historic Places
- U.S. Historic district
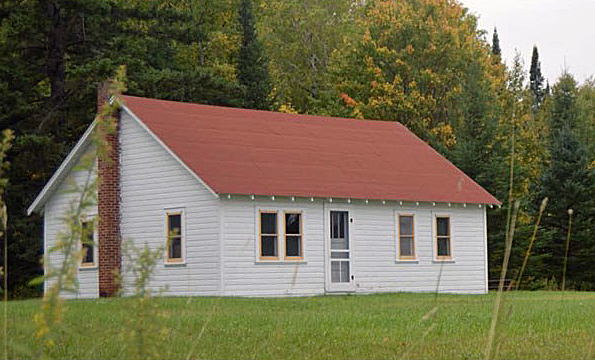
- One of the cabins at Monson's Hoist Bay Resort

- Location within Minnesota Location within the United States
- Location: Hoist Bay, Namakan Lake, St. Louis County, Minnesota
- Coordinates: 48°25′5″N 92°44′55″W
- Area: 33.468 acres (13.544 ha)
- Built: 1939–1968
- Architectural style: Late 19th & Early 20th Century American Movements
- MPS: Tourism and Recreational Properties in Voyageurs National Park 1880–1950 MPS
- NRHP reference No.: 11000362
- Added to NRHP: June 15, 2011

Monson's Hoist Bay Resort is a former summer resort on Namakan Lake in the U.S. state of Minnesota, in what is now Voyageurs National Park. Ted and Fern Monson established the resort in 1939 and operated it every summer until 1973, except for a three-year hiatus during World War II. The remote property was and remains accessible only by water. Monson's Hoist Bay Resort was listed as a historic district on the National Register of Historic Places in 2011 for its local significance in the theme of entertainment/recreation. It was nominated for exemplifying the family-owned resorts established in the mid 20th century to serve the growing phenomenon of middle-class tourists.

The National Park Service maintains the site as a day-use destination within Voyageurs National Park. Several of the historic buildings are open to visitors, along with basic amenities consisting of a boat dock, an outhouse, and picnic tables.

== Description ==
The historic district includes nine contributing properties constructed from 1939 to 1968. These comprise four cabins built 1939–1945, a 1941 kitchen/store, 1940s ice house, 1968 boathouse, a root cellar, and the surrounding landscape. A 1970s dining hall constructed on the site for a National Park Service youth camp is considered a non-contributing property.

== See also ==
- National Register of Historic Places listings in St. Louis County, Minnesota
- National Register of Historic Places listings in Voyageurs National Park
