= Island View, Minnesota =

Unincorporated community in Minnesota, United States

Island View
- Unincorporated community
- Location within Minnesota Location within the United States
- Coordinates: 48°35′43″N 93°10′01″W
- Country: United States
- State: Minnesota
- County: Koochiching
- Elevation: 1,148 ft (350 m)
- Time zone: UTC-6 (Central (CST))
  - Summer (DST): UTC-5 (CDT)
- ZIP code: 56649
- Area code: 218
- GNIS feature ID: 656740

Island View is an unincorporated community in Koochiching County, Minnesota, United States.

The community is located ten miles east of International Falls at Rainy Lake on State Highway 11 (MN 11).

Island View is located within Rainy Lake Unorganized Territory.

The Rainy Lake Visitor Center at Voyageurs National Park is nearby.

Island View disincorporated in 1992.

Historical population
| Census | Pop. | Note | %± |
|---|---|---|---|
| 1950 | 18 | | — |
| 1960 | 13 | | −27.8% |
| 1970 | 44 | | 238.5% |
| 1980 | 101 | | 129.5% |
| 1990 | 150 | | 48.5% |
U.S. Decennial Census
