= 21SL55 =

Archaeological site in Minnesota, U.S.

- Archeological Site 21SL55
- U.S. National Register of Historic Places
- Location: Address restricted, Voyageurs National Park, Minnesota
- Area: 406.4 square metres (4,374 sq ft)
- Built: 700–1500 C.E.
- NRHP reference No.: 88000989
- Added to NRHP: July 8, 1988

21SL55 is a precontact Native American archaeological site in the Boundary Waters of northern Minnesota, United States. It was occupied by the Blackduck culture of the late Woodland period sometime between 700 and 1500 C.E. Located on a small island in what is now Voyageurs National Park, the site is known only by its Smithsonian trinomial. It contains well-preserved faunal remains, a possible ricing jig, and other subsurface features.

The site was listed on the National Register of Historic Places in 1988 under the name Archeological Site 21SL55 for its local significance in the theme of prehistoric archaeology. As an island site occupied exclusively during one cultural period in what is now a protected area, 21SL55 was nominated for its potential to illuminate regional subsistence patterns of the late Woodland period.

== Description ==
The site is on a small island in Namakan Lake. The artifact assemblage covers only about 400 square metres (4,300 sq ft). The cultural occupation layer is a sandy loam between 5 and 15 centimetres (2.0 and 5.9 in) thick under 9 to 11 centimetres (3.5 to 4.3 in) of humus. Artifact density at the site is relatively low. Artifacts documented at the site consist of ceramics, stone tools including a hammerstone, lithic debitage, and animal bones.

A distinctive feature left behind by the occupants is a pit 92 centimetres (36 in) across and 20 centimetres (7.9 in) deep lined with a silty clay not found anywhere else at the site. Archaeologists have tentatively identified this as a jig for processing wild rice, a staple food in the region.

As of the site's 1988 National Register nomination, only 2.5% of its area had been excavated, and no radiocarbon or thermoluminescence dating had been conducted, so its dating to the late Woodland period derived only from the surface treatment of the ceramic sherds, a projectile point, and the suggestion of intensive wild rice use.

== Use ==
It is uncertain whether Blackduck people occupied 21SL55 seasonally or year-round, but the thick cultural layer suggests use over many years. Only a small number of people could have dwelt there at a time given the size of the island. They left behind artifacts such as chipped stone tools, lithic debris, and ceramics. Faunal remains consist of beaver, lynx or bobcat, and moose bones. The moose were likely taken by hunting parties, while the other species were likely caught with traps or snares. These mammals comprise the majority of the faunal remains, but the inhabitants also left behind bones from double-crested cormorants. As these birds migrate away in the cold season, 21SL55 cannot have been exclusively a winter camp. The site may have been a hunting and trapping camp, as projectile points are proportionally more common here than most other precontact archaeological sites in Voyageurs National Park, but this remains speculative pending further research.

== Significance ==
Many archaeological sites contain remains from multiple periods, leaving a complex puzzle for modern researchers, so 21SL55 is valuable as a site containing a clean record from just one period. This is particularly valuable as the late Woodland period is poorly understood in the Boundary Waters. 21SL55's location emphasizes that even very small islands played a role in the region's pattern of human settlement. Finally, as archaeological sites are compromised or destroyed by modern development, sites like 21SL55 within national parks form a critical reserve of intact windows on the past.

== See also ==
- National Register of Historic Places listings in St. Louis County, Minnesota
