= Jun Fujita =

American poet

Jun Fujita (Japanese: 藤田 準之助, Fujita Junnosuke, 18 December 1888 - 12 July 1963) was a first-generation Japanese-American photojournalist, photographer, silent film actor, and published poet in the United States. He was the first Japanese-American photojournalist. As an American, Fujita lived in Chicago, Illinois and worked for the now defunct newspapers: the Chicago Evening Post, published from 1886 to 1932, and Chicago Daily News, which was published 1876 to 1978. Fujita was the only photographer to document the aftermath of the St. Valentine's Day massacre. Following his death in 1963, most of his work was donated to the Chicago Historical Society, which later became the Chicago History Museum.

== Early life ==
Jun Fujita was born Junnosuke Fujita on 18 December 1888 in Nishimura, a village near Hiroshima, Japan. When he was older, Fujita moved from Japan to Canada, where he worked odd jobs to save enough money to move to the United States of America, which he considered to be a "land of opportunity." He moved to Chicago, Illinois, where he attended and graduated from Wendell Phillips Academy High School, a mixed-race four-year public school that later became a predominantly African-American school with notable alumni such as Nat "King" Cole, Gwendolyn Brooks, and Archibald Carey, Jr. Following his high school graduation, he studied mathematics at the Armour Institute of Technology, which later became the Illinois Institute of Technology, with plans to become an engineer. To help pay his way through college, Fujita took a job as the first and only photojournalist at the Chicago Evening Post, which later became the Chicago Daily News.

== Career ==
=== Photojournalism ===
Fujita's career as a photojournalist caused numerous media sensations. He became known not only in Chicago but nationally as well. Fujita was the only photographer to capture two of the century's biggest events: the aftermath of the St. Valentine's Day massacre and the sinking of the S.S. Eastland.

Fujita also photographed and documented racism against African-Americans in the Chicago area during his career. Notable examples included photographing three Illinois Army National Guard questioning a black man during the Chicago Race Riot of 1919 and photographing several White-American men stoning a black man to death. He also defied a court order and photographed Dr. William D. Shepard, D.O. at Shepard's murder trial. Fujita photographed some of the most famous people of his time, including Albert Einstein, Frank Lloyd Wright and Al Capone.

Towards the end of his newspaper career, he operated a photo booth at Century of Progress. He also opened his own photography studio called Photo Craft, where he served clients such as Sears, Roebuck and Company. In his semi-retirement, Fujita photographed and painted prairies and wildflowers in Illinois and participated in showing some of his work.

=== Writing ===
In addition to a historic career as a photojournalist, Fujita was an accomplished and published poet and author. Fujita was the first Japanese-American to write tanka, a form of waka. He compiled a collection of his poems in Tanka: Poems in Exile. This book was published by Covici-McGee in 1923. He also contributed writings to Poetry, the magazine published by the Modern Poetry Society (which later became the Poetry Foundation), and the Literary Digest.

=== Acting ===
Fujita worked as a silent film actor for Essanay Studios in Chicago, a movie studio which was best known for producing several Charlie Chaplin comedies. Fujita had several minor roles before starring in a lead role in the two-reel film called Otherwise Bill Harrison in 1915. His film career waned as the movie industry shifted from Chicago to Hollywood, California.

== Personal life ==
Fujita married Florence Carr, a white journalist from Illinois. Florence was born Flossie Carr in Ringwood, Illinois on 16 October 1893 and died on Chestnut Street in Chicago in October 1974. It has been asserted that due to anti-miscegenation laws, the two were unable to marry until 1940, some years after they initially met. A more likely explanation is that under terms of the Expatriation Act of 1907, Carr would have lost her citizenship by marrying Fujita, a non-citizen. This provision was repealed by the Nationality Act of 1940.

The two lived together at 1930 West Chicago Avenue in Chicago, Illinois and had no children. Carr and Fujita also owned a cabin on Rainy Lake in Minnesota, which was called "Jap Island" by locals. Fujita's cabin is listed on the National Register of Historic Places. He later bought six acres of the Indiana Dunes where he and Carr hosted friends in a diamond-shaped house they called "the Kite," which was razed when the property was absorbed into the dunes lakeshore area that later became a national park.

Fujita was granted honorary citizenship in the United States by an act of Congress. The United States Senate Bill was submitted by James Hamilton Lewis, who was the senator from Illinois at the time. Senator Lewis submitted the Bill for Fujita's American citizenship due to Fujita's contributions to American society in the area of photojournalism. Fujita's citizenship came at a time when Asian-Americans were not allowed American citizenship by naturalization due to their race. After the attack on Pearl Harbor, Fujita volunteered to serve in active duty for the United States but was turned down due to his age, as he was 53 years old at the time.

Fujita died on 12 July 1963, at the age of 74. Fujita was cremated and interred in an unknown plot in Chicago's Graceland Cemetery, most likely in the Japanese section.

== Legacy ==
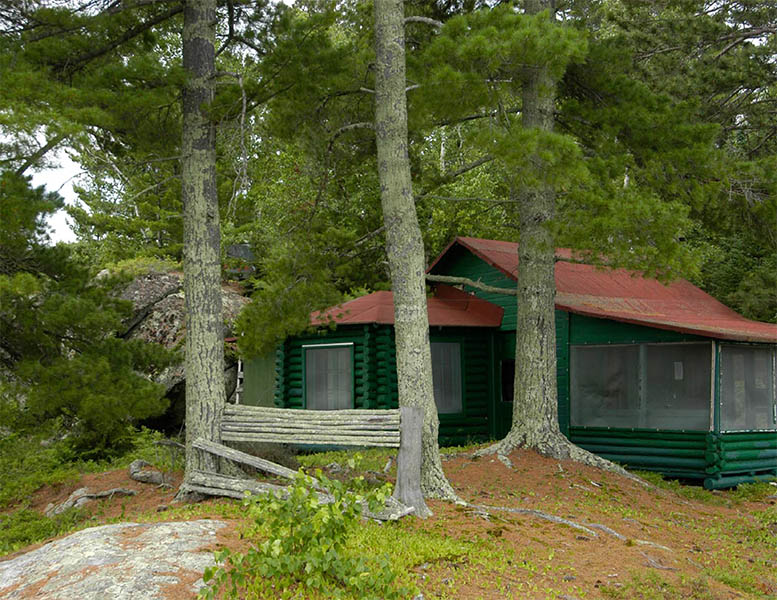
Jun Fujita cabin at Voyageurs National Park

Fujita is considered to be a groundbreaking icon among Asian-Americans, Japanese-Americans, and photojournalists. Following his death, Fujita's widow Florence donated most of his work to the Chicago History Museum.

From Thursday, January 12, 2017 - Friday, May 26, 2017, the Poetry Foundation hosted an exhibition of his photographs and ephemera, entitled Jun Fujita: Oblivion.

In 2020, the Newberry Library in Chicago launched an exhibit examining Fujita's life and work.
