= Kabetogama State Forest =

State Forest in Koochiching and St. Louis counties, Minnesota

- Location within Minnesota

Geography
- Location: Koochiching and Saint Louis counties, Minnesota, United States
- Coordinates: 48°26′13″N 93°02′22″W
- Elevation: 1,312 feet (400 m)
- Area: 619,287 acres (250,617 ha)

Administration
- Established: 1933
- Authority: United States Forest Service/Minnesota Department of Natural Resources
- Website: www.dnr.state.mn.us/state_forests/sft00027/index.html

Ecology
- WWF Classification: Western Great Lakes Forests
- EPA Classification: Northern Lakes and Forests

The Kabetogama State Forest is a state forest located in Koochiching and Saint Louis counties, Minnesota, United States. The forest borders the Superior National Forest and the Boundary Waters Canoe Area Wilderness to the east, the Sturgeon River State Forest to the south, the Nett Lake Indian Reservation to the west, and Voyageurs National Park to the north. The forest is managed by the Minnesota Department of Natural Resources.

== Recreation ==
Popular outdoor recreational activities are largely centered on the abundant lakes and rivers in the forest, such as boating, canoeing, kayaking, and fishing. "Boat-in camping" (canoe camping) is possible on the popular 39,271-acre (158.92 km^{2}) Lake Vermilion, and more traditional camping is possible throughout the forest. Campsites administered by the forest are available on Namakan Lake and the 24,033-acre (97.26 km^{2}) Kabetogama Lake, which are technically located within Voyageurs National Park.

Trails are designated for hiking and snowmobiling, 12 miles (19 km) specifically for cross-country skiing and mountain biking, 3.5 miles (5.6 km) for Class I and II all-terrain vehicle use, as well as dirt biking.

== See also ==
- List of Minnesota state forests
- Boundary Waters Canoe Area Wilderness
- Voyageurs National Park
