= Ranier, Minnesota =

City in Minnesota, United States

Ranier
- City
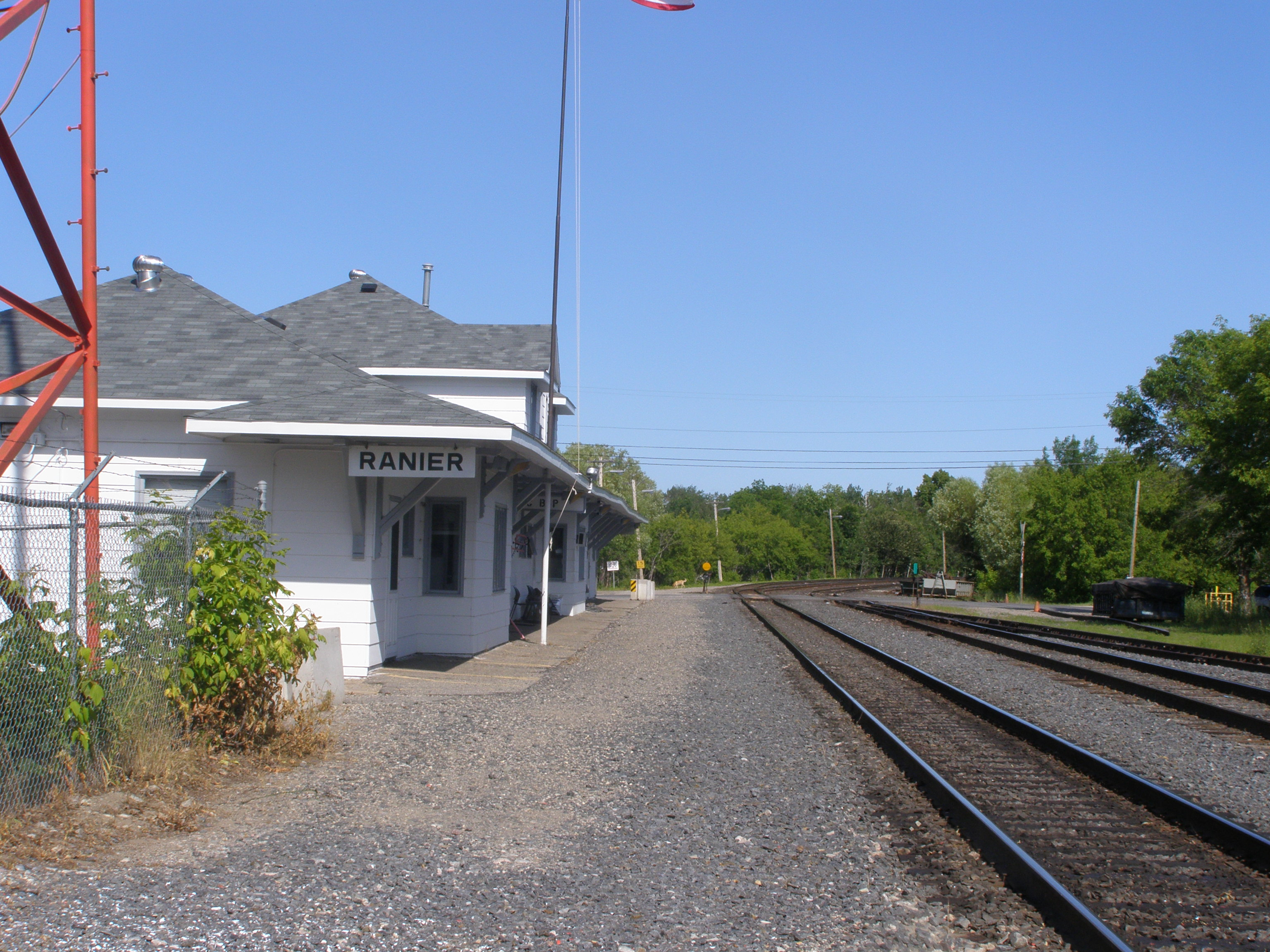

- Location of the city of Ranier within Koochiching County, Minnesota
- Coordinates: 48°36′44″N 93°20′53″W
- Country: United States
- State: Minnesota
- County: Koochiching

Area
  - Total: 1.08 sq mi (2.80 km^{2})
  - Land: 1.07 sq mi (2.76 km^{2})
  - Water: 0.015 sq mi (0.04 km^{2})
- Elevation: 1,122 ft (342 m)

Population (2020)
  - Total: 569
  - Density: 533.6/sq mi (206.03/km^{2})
- Time zone: UTC-6 (Central (CST))
  - Summer (DST): UTC-5 (CDT)
- ZIP code: 56668
- Area code: 218
- FIPS code: 27-53134
- GNIS feature ID: 0657979
- Website: https://raniermn.govoffice2.com/

Ranier /rəˈnɪər/ rə-NEER) is a city in Koochiching County, Minnesota, United States. The population was 569 at the 2020 census.

Ranier is located east of the city of International Falls, along State Highway 11 (MN 11). Fort Frances, Ontario is located directly across the river.

Incorporated in 1908, the small village of Ranier began as a busy pioneer town filled with people willing to make an impact in the northland. Businesses sprang up all over Ranier, including hotels, grocers, saloons, and brothels. During prohibition, the town gained a negative reputation from its illegal alcohol. Illegal booze was popular. Being the port of entry into Canada and being situated on Rainy Lake made for a prime playing field for bootleggers.

== Geography ==
According to the United States Census Bureau, the city has a total area of 0.14 square miles (0.36 km^{2}), all land.

The Rainy River and Rainy Lake meet at Ranier beneath the oldest cantilevered bridge in North America built in 1908. The Ranier Railroad Bridge (Canadian National (CN) River Bridge) was constructed in 1908. The single-track lift bridge crosses Rainy River between Ranier, Minnesota, and Fort Frances, Ontario, and is one of the busiest ports of entry for international rail freight in the United States.

== Demographics ==
Historical population
Census	Pop.	Note	%±
1910	190		—
1920	157		−17.4%
1930	205		30.6%
1940	228		11.2%
1950	227		−0.4%
1960	262		15.4%
1970	255		−2.7%
1980	237		−7.1%
1990	199		−16.0%
2000	188		−5.5%
2010	145		−22.9%
2020	569		292.4%
U.S. Decennial Census; 2020 Census

=== 2010 census ===
As of the census of 2010, there were 145 people, 70 households, and 40 families living in the city. The population density was 1,035.7 inhabitants per square mile (399.9/km^{2}). There were 89 housing units at an average density of 635.7 units per square mile (245.4 units/km^{2}). The racial makeup of the city was 98.6% White, 0.7% Asian, and 0.7% from two or more races. Hispanic or Latino of any race were 1.4% of the population.

There were 70 households, of which 14.3% had children under the age of 18 living with them, 45.7% were married couples living together, 4.3% had a female householder with no husband present, 7.1% had a male householder with no wife present, and 42.9% were non-families. 38.6% of all households were made up of individuals, and 10% had someone living alone who was 65 years of age or older. The average household size was 1.83 and the average family size was 2.38.

The median age in the city was 56.8 years. 10.3% of residents were under the age of 18; 3.4% were between the ages of 18 and 24; 14.4% were from 25 to 44; 42.1% were from 45 to 64; and 29.7% were 65 years of age or older. The gender makeup of the city was 48.3% male and 51.7% female.

=== 2000 census ===
As of the census of 2000, there were 188 people, 76 households, and 50 families living in the city. The population density was 1,268.1 inhabitants per square mile (489.6/km^{2}). There were 88 housing units at an average density of 593.6 units per square mile (229.2 units/km^{2}). The racial makeup of the city was 97.87% White, 1.06% Native American, and 1.06% from two or more races.

There were 76 households, out of which 28.9% had children under the age of 18 living with them, 50.0% were married couples living together, 3.9% had a female householder with no husband present, and 32.9% were non-families. 27.6% of all households were made up of individuals, and 11.8% had someone living alone who was 65 years of age or older. The average household size was 2.30 and the average family size was 2.78.

In the city, the population was spread out, with 22.3% under the age of 18, 3.7% from 18 to 24, 26.1% from 25 to 44, 26.1% from 45 to 64, and 21.8% who were 65 years of age or older. The median age was 43 years. For every 100 females, there were 100.0 males. For every 100 females age 18 and over, there were 100.0 males.

The median income for a household in the city was $39,375, and the median income for a family was $49,375. Males had a median income of $50,875 versus $25,833 for females. The per capita income for the city was $20,784. None of the population or families were below the poverty line.

== See also ==
- Voyageurs National Park
- City of Ranier
- Ranier Days
