= Crane Lake, Minnesota =

Crane Lake
- incorporated community
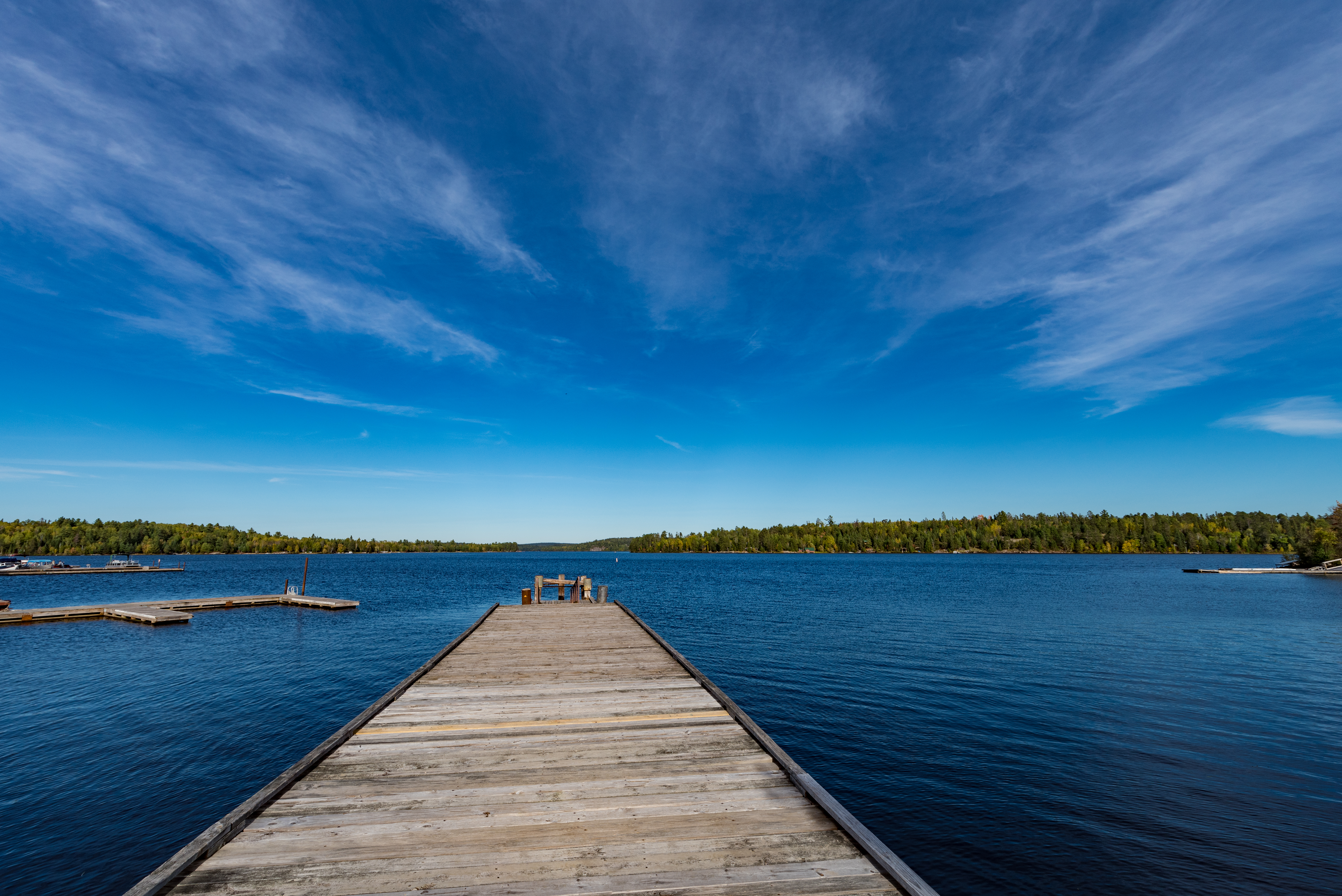

- Location within Minnesota Location within the United States
- Coordinates: 48°16′00″N 92°29′19″W
- Country: United States
- State: Minnesota
- County: Saint Louis
- Township: Crane Lake Township
- Elevation: 1,135 ft (346 m)

Population
  - Total: 81
- Time zone: UTC-6 (Central (CST))
  - Summer (DST): UTC-5 (CDT)
- ZIP code: 55725
- Area code: 218
- GNIS feature ID: 661065

Crane Lake is an unincorporated community in Crane Lake Township, Saint Louis County, Minnesota, United States; located within the Kabetogama State Forest.

Crane Lake is situated at the southern entry to the Voyageurs National Park; the western entry to the Boundary Waters Canoe Area Wilderness; and an entry into Canada.

The community is located 27 miles (43 km) northeast of Orr, along Saint Louis County Roads 23 and 24. Crane Lake is located 45 miles northeast of Cook. The northern terminus of County Road 24 is at Crane Lake.

== Notes ==
Adjacent Crane Lake is known for walleye and small mouth bass fishing; having access to Sand Point Lake, Namakan Lake, Loon Lake, Lac La Croix, Ash River, and Kabetogama Lake, make the area a large chain of lakes. The Superior National Forest borders the east side of Crane Lake.
