= E. F. Hodgson Company =

The E. F. Hodgson Company of Dover, Massachusetts, was one of a number of companies who used specialty mail-order catalogs, to advertise and sell sectional and ready-cut houses. From a small New England town, the Hodgson Company competed with economic giants such as Sears Roebuck and Montgomery Ward, to attract the attention of a growing America in the 1890s. Using the railroad to access its market, the specialty house mail-order catalog company competed all over the United States. There is still a good argument for the theory that the Hodgson Company was in the market before Sears, and equaled them in production. But even so, Hodgson became better known outside of the United States in such places as Belgium, Italy, France, Newfoundland, and Jerusalem. From 1892 to 1944, the Hodgson Company was arguably the most important economic force of the simple agricultural community of Dover.
