= Sand Point Lake (Minnesota / Ontario) =

Lake in the state of Minnesota, United States

- Location within Minnesota
- Location: Minnesota and Ontario
- Coordinates: 48°24′N 92°27′W
- Type: lake

Sand Point Lake is a lake on the border of Minnesota and Ontario. Approximately half of the lake is in Minnesota, USA and the other half is in Ontario, Canada. The Minnesota portion is within Voyageurs National Park. The Sand Point Lake Water Aerodrome is located on the Ontario side.

== See also ==
- Clearwater Bay, Ontario
