= Kabetogama Lake =

Lake in the state of Minnesota, United States

- Lac Travere
- Gaa-biitoogamaag-zaaga'igan (Ojibwe)
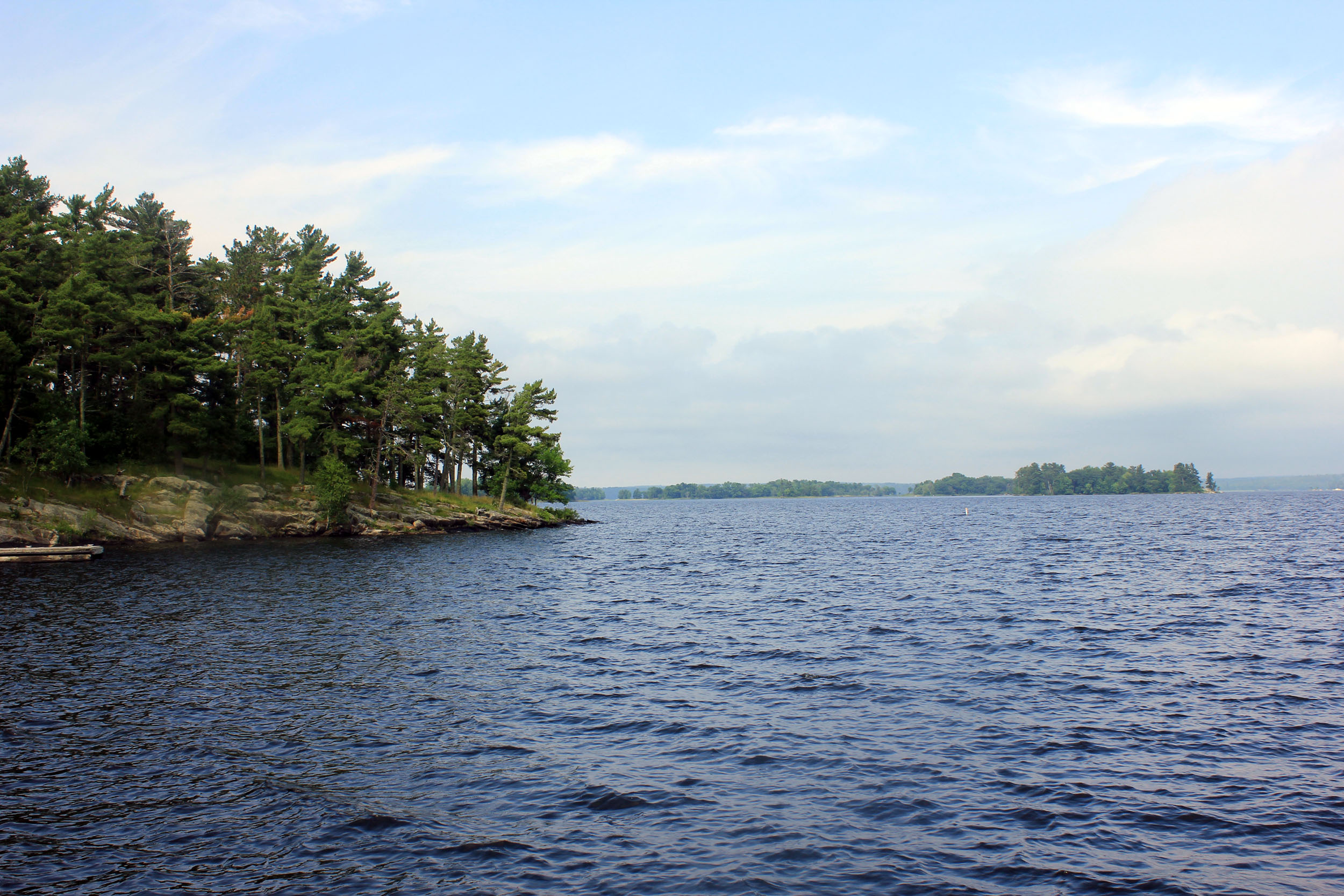

- Location within Minnesota
- Location: St. Louis County, Minnesota
- Coordinates: 48°27′30″N 93°02′31″W
- Type: Lake
- Surface elevation: 339 m (1,112 ft)
- Settlements: Kabetogama, Minnesota

Kabetogama Lake or Lake Kabetogama (/ˌkæbəˈtoʊɡəmə/ KAB-ə-TOH-gə-mə) is a clear lake in northern St. Louis County, Minnesota within Voyageurs National Park. It has a surface area of 25,760 acres (104 km^{2}) and it is one of the state's 10 largest inland lakes.

== Description ==
Kabetogama Lake drains into Namakan Lake to the east, and roughly parallels the near-by Rainy Lake. A thin peninsula is all that separates the two lakes. The lake is 15 miles long, has 78 miles of shoreline, a maximum depth of 80 feet, and 200 islands. It is part of the Arctic watershed of Hudson Bay.

The Ojibwe name Gaa-biitoogamaag-zaaga'igan translates to “the lake that lies parallel with another lake” or “the lake that doubles with another lake” or "the place where there is one lake after another." French fur trappers similarly referred to Kabetogama as Travere or Travers, meaning “alongside.”

The community of Kabetogama, located along the south shores of the Lake serves as the gateway into Voyageurs National Park.

== History ==
The area around Kabetogama Lake was occupied by the Ojibwe. In 1887, the Nett Lake-Kabetogama Road was laid out by the U.S. Indian Service to deliver annuities to Nett Lake band members, part of the Bois Forte Band of Chippewa, living on the lake. Around this time, early outdoorspeople already were exploring the lakes for wilderness scenery, wildlife, and fishing and boating, and tourism initiatives in the area began.

Kabetogma State Forest was established in 1917. In the 1920s, a Minnesota Forest Service patrol cabin was constructed on the lake, requiring a permanent ranger to monitor the forests for fire and ensure fire protection policy compliance by logging companies.

Wealthy summer residents built homes on the lake. Businesses such as resorts, like Watson's Lake View Resort constructed 1918, also were constructed on the lake. By 1936, there were 26 resorts on the lake and by 1949, there were 42 camps, hotels, and resorts. Private camps, such as St. Thomas College's Bassett's Boys Camp and a YMCA camp were also established on the lake.

The Civilian Conservation Corps constructed roads in the Kabetogama area, cleaned up beaches and shorelines, and constructed many state forest campgrounds. In 1939, reefs were charted on Kabetogama in order to aid vacation boating and fishing.

== Ecology ==
Species of fish present in Kabetogama include black crappie, bluegill, burbot, lake sturgeon, lake whitefish, largemouth bass, mooneye, northern pike, rock bass, sauger, shorthead redhorse, silver redhorse, smallmouth bass, tullibee, walleye, white sucker, and yellow perch.
