= Rainy Lake =

Lake in Ontario, Canada and Minnesota, United States

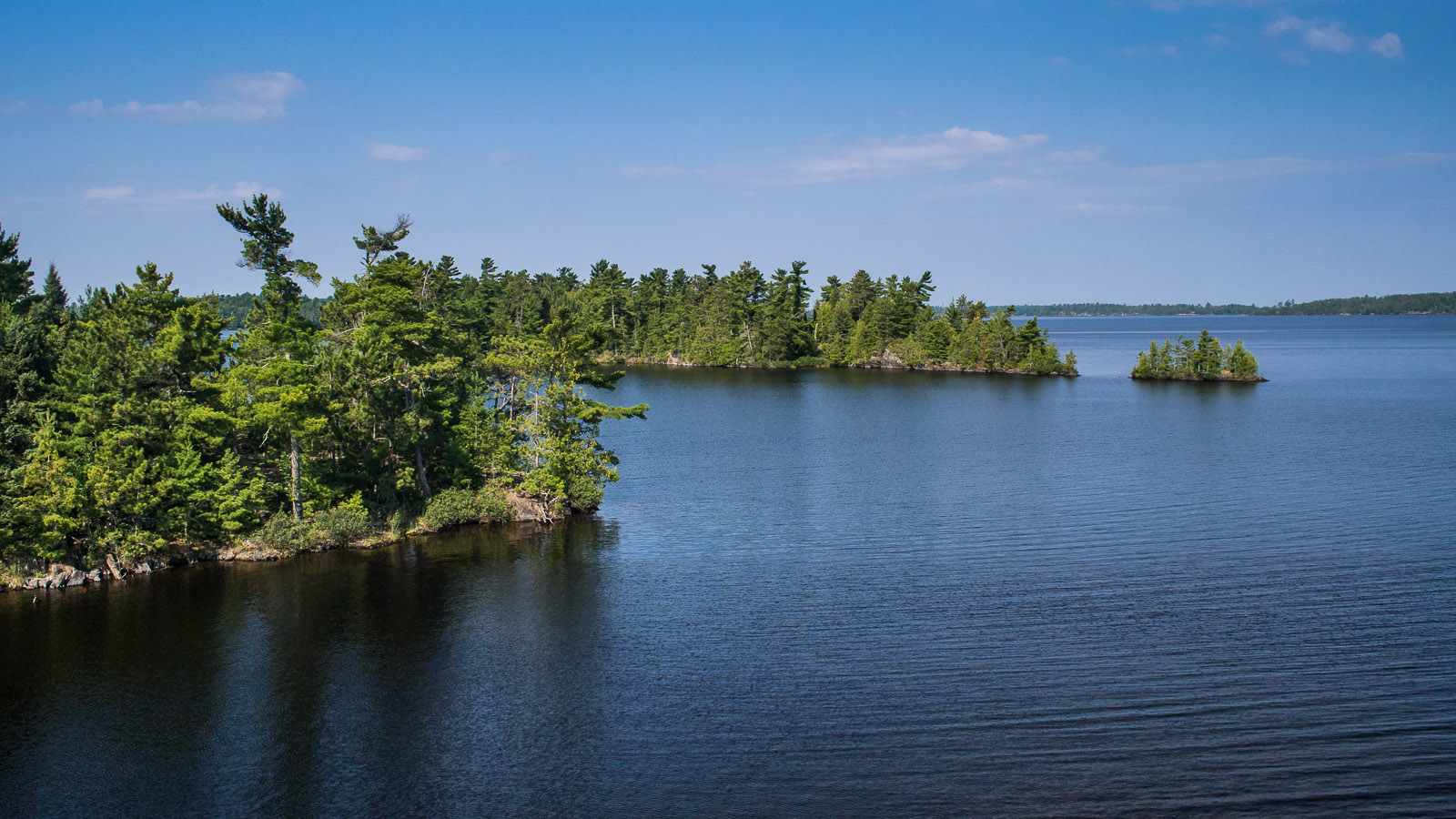
- Characteristic shoreline and islands of Rainy Lake

- Location of Rainy Lake on the US/Canadian border between Minnesota and Ontario Rainy Lake (Minnesota)

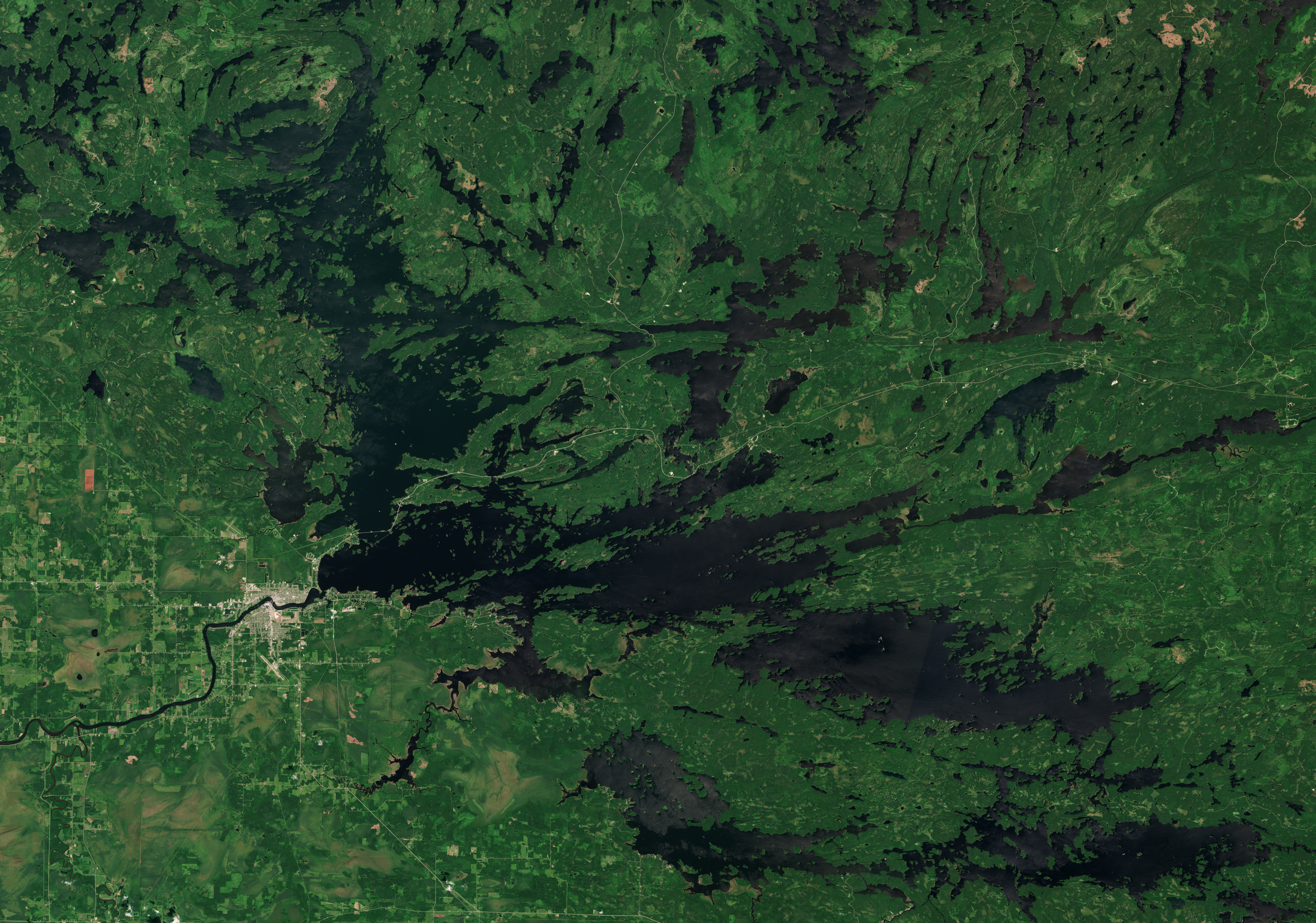
- Location: Minnesota, United States; Ontario, Canada
- Coordinates: 48°38′13″N 93°01′53″W
- Type: remnant of former glacial Lake Agassiz
- Primary inflows: Namakan Lake; Kabetogama Lake; Seine River
- Primary outflows: Rainy River
- Basin countries: Canada, United States
- Max. length: 80 km (50 mi)
- Max. width: 48 km (30 mi)
- Surface area: 932 km^{2} (360 sq mi)
- Max. depth: 50 m (160 ft) highly variable
- Shore length^{1}: 1,500 km (930 mi); 2,520 km (1,570 mi) (w/ Islands) highly irregular, rocky shoreline
- Surface elevation: 338 m (1,109 ft)
- Islands: ~2,568
- Settlements: International Falls, Minnesota; Ranier, Minnesota; Fort Frances, Ontario
- ^{1} Shore length is not a well-defined measure.

Rainy Lake (French: lac à la Pluie; Ojibwe: gojiji-zaaga'igan) is a freshwater lake with a surface area of 930 km^{2} (360 sq mi) that straddles the border between the United States and Canada. The Rainy River issues from the west side of the lake. Today it is harnessed to make hydroelectricity for United States (US) and Canadian locations. International Falls, Minnesota and the much smaller city of Ranier, Minnesota are situated opposite Fort Frances, Ontario, on either side of the Rainy River. Rainy Lake and Rainy River establish part of the boundary between the U.S. state of Minnesota and the Canadian province of Ontario.

Voyageurs National Park is located on the southeastern corner of the lake, where it connects with Kabetogama and Namakan lakes at Kettle Falls. Rainy Lake is part of an extremely large system of lakes forming the Hudson Bay drainage basin that stretches from west of Lake Superior north to the Arctic Ocean. The Rainy Lake watershed includes the Boundary Waters Canoe Area Wilderness (BWCA), portions of the Superior National Forest on the Us side of the border, and the Quetico Provincial Park on the Canadian side of the border.

For exploration and fur trade history, see Winnipeg River and additional references below.

== Name ==
The earliest documentation of the lake's name is "Tekamamiwen" (shown in French transliterated as "Lac de Tecamamiouen" on the Ochagach map (c. 1728). The name was represented in various spellings: as "Lac Tacamamioüer" on the 1739 de l'Isle map, as "Lake Tecamaniouen" on the 1757 Mitchell Map, and as "Lake Tekamamigovouen" on the Thomas Jefferys 1762 Map of Canada). Pierre Gaultier de Varennes, sieur de La Vérendrye said that the name was a corruption from the Cree "tahki-mâna-kimiwan", meaning "It always is raining", referring to the Rainy River. He said that the lake was also known as "Ouichichick" (Ojibwe word Gojijiing or Cree Kocicīhk, both meaning "at the place of inlets"). Early documents lists the portion of Rainy Lake east of the Brule Narrows as "Cristinaux [Cree] Lake" or as "Little Lake."

== Geology ==
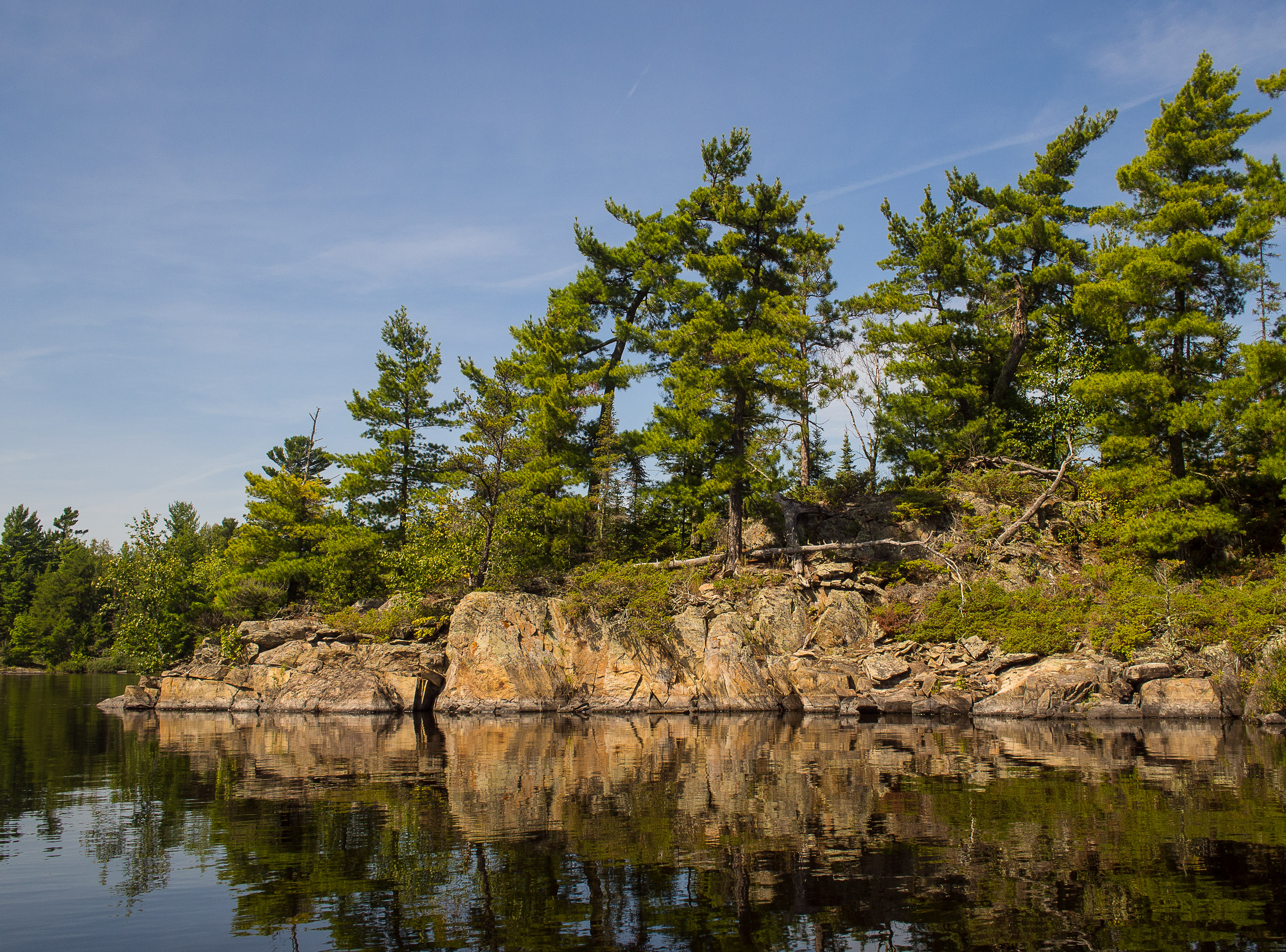
Rocky shoreline on Rainy Lake

Geologically Rainy Lake is part of the Superior Craton of the Canadian Shield and retains features associated with it, such as a large, ancient caldera and fault lines that can be clearly seen in satellite images of the lake. The Rainy Lake – Seine River Fault zone is a strike-slip fault zone passing through Rainy Lake from Tilson Bay in the southwest to Seine Bay in the northeast.

The Quetico Fault passes through Rainy Lake on an east–west path through McDonald Inlet. The fault system forms a triangular wrench zone separating the granite-greenstone terrain of the Wabigoon subprovince to the north from the metasedimentary terrain of the Quetico subprovince to the south.

The rock under the lake and exposed on many of its islands is an exposed part of the North American craton composed of ancient Precambrian rock. This rock has been significantly affected by glaciation, which dominates much of the recent geologic history of the area.

== Recreation ==
=== Voyageurs National Park ===
Voyageurs National Park maintains an extensive network of 46 boat-in camping sites on Rainy Lake, in addition to hiking trails and designated snowmobile trails for winter use.

=== Fishing ===
The lake is popular for sport and recreational fishing of species such as walleye, northern pike, muskellunge, crappie, largemouth and smallmouth bass, which are all considered excellent freshwater game fish. Rainy Lake is home to the annual Canadian Bass Championship, which has been held every summer since 1996. The lake is dotted with many small islands on both the Canadian and American sides; numerous fishing cabins, small fishing resorts, and vacation homes have been built on these islands. Fishing tourism and guided fishing services comprise a significant sector of the local economy.

=== Winter activities ===
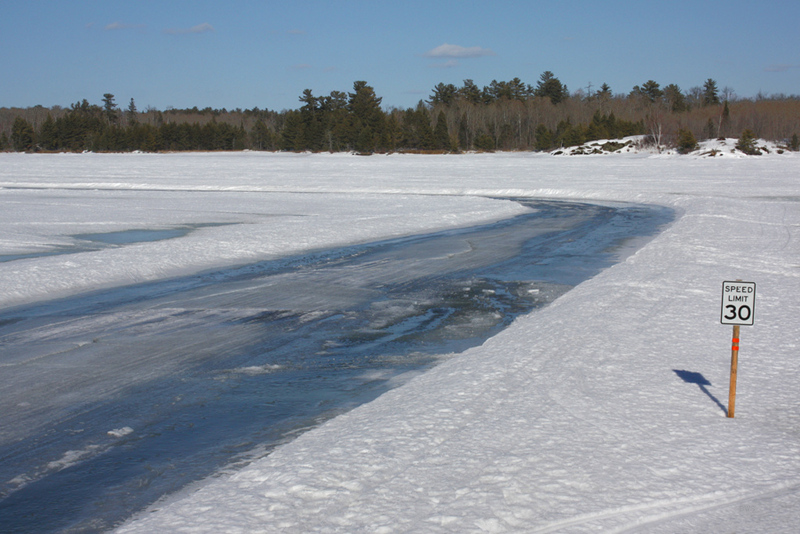
Ice road in April 2013

Winter access to Rainy Lake by car is provided by an ice road maintained by the National Park Service of the United States. Popular winter sports include ice fishing, cross-country skiing, snowshoeing, and snowmobiling.

== Governance ==
Rainy Lake, with the US/Canada border running through it

=== Applicable laws ===
Rainy Lake spans the Canada–United States border. The laws of Canada and the Province of Ontario apply to the portions of the lake on the Canadian side of the border; the laws of the US and the State of Minnesota apply to those portions on the US side of the border. The relevant law enforcement agencies of each country are responsible for the portions of the lake within their respective borders. The Canadian and US Coast Guards maintain navigational aids on their respective sides of the border. Boaters and fishermen must be aware of the requirements imposed by relevant jurisdictions while traveling or fishing on Rainy Lake (see External links).

=== Border crossing ===
Visitors to Canada must report to a Canada Customs office before going ashore in Canada. However, US and Canadian citizens and permanent residents traveling on the lake who wish to go ashore can apply for a CANPASS Remote Area Border Crossing (RABC) permit allowing them to enter into Canada without reporting to Canadian customs. Boaters entering US waters from Canada, and who are citizens or permanent residents of the US and Canada, can apply for the Canadian Border Boat Landing Program (I-68 Permit Program) which allows them to report to US Customs and Border Protection by telephone. With proper documentation, these permits can be obtained at the US and Canadian customs offices located near the International Bridge in International Falls and Fort Frances, respectively.

=== Water level management ===
The level of Rainy Lake is controlled at the hydro-electric power houses of the international dam that spans the Rainy River between International Falls and Fort Frances, at two water-control dams located at Kettle Falls where the outflow from Namakan Lake enters Rainy Lake, and at the Sturgeon Falls Generating Station located on the Seine River. The companies that own and operate the powerhouses (Boise Paper on the US side and H_{2}O Power Limited Partnership on the Canadian side) are responsible for maintaining lake level and flow changes from the dams within normal ranges, subject to regulatory oversight by the International Rainy-Lake of the Woods Watershed Board (IRLWWB). The IRLWWB is a board of the International Joint Commission (IJC), which is a bi-national organization created out of the International Boundary Waters Treaty of 1909 for the purposes of handling boundary water issues between the United States and Canada.

== In popular culture ==
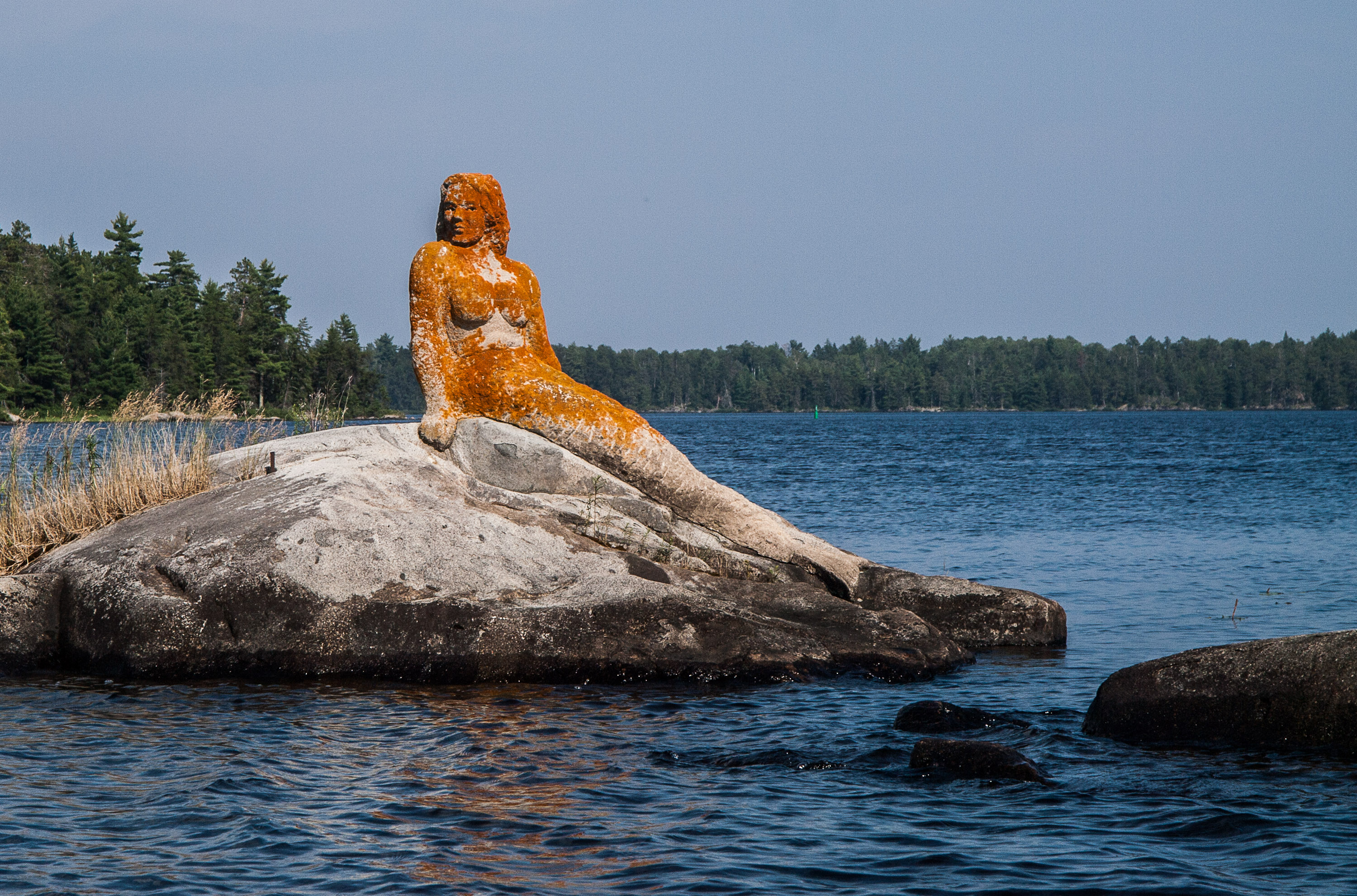
Mermaid sculpture on Rainy Lake

Rainy Lake (Rainy River) plays a pivotal role in Tim O'Brien's novel The Things They Carried. Other novels set on Rainy Lake include:

- Wilder's Edge by Diane Bradley, published by North Star Press of St. Cloud, 2013.
- Wilder's Foe by Diane Bradley, published by North Star Press of St. Cloud, 2014.
- Frozen by Mary Casanova, published by University of Minnesota Press, 2012.
- When Eagles Fall by Mary Casanova, published by University of Minnesota Press, 2014.

Non-fictional works set on Rainy Lake include:

- Fawn Island by Doug Woods, published by University of Minnesota Press, 2001.

== See also ==
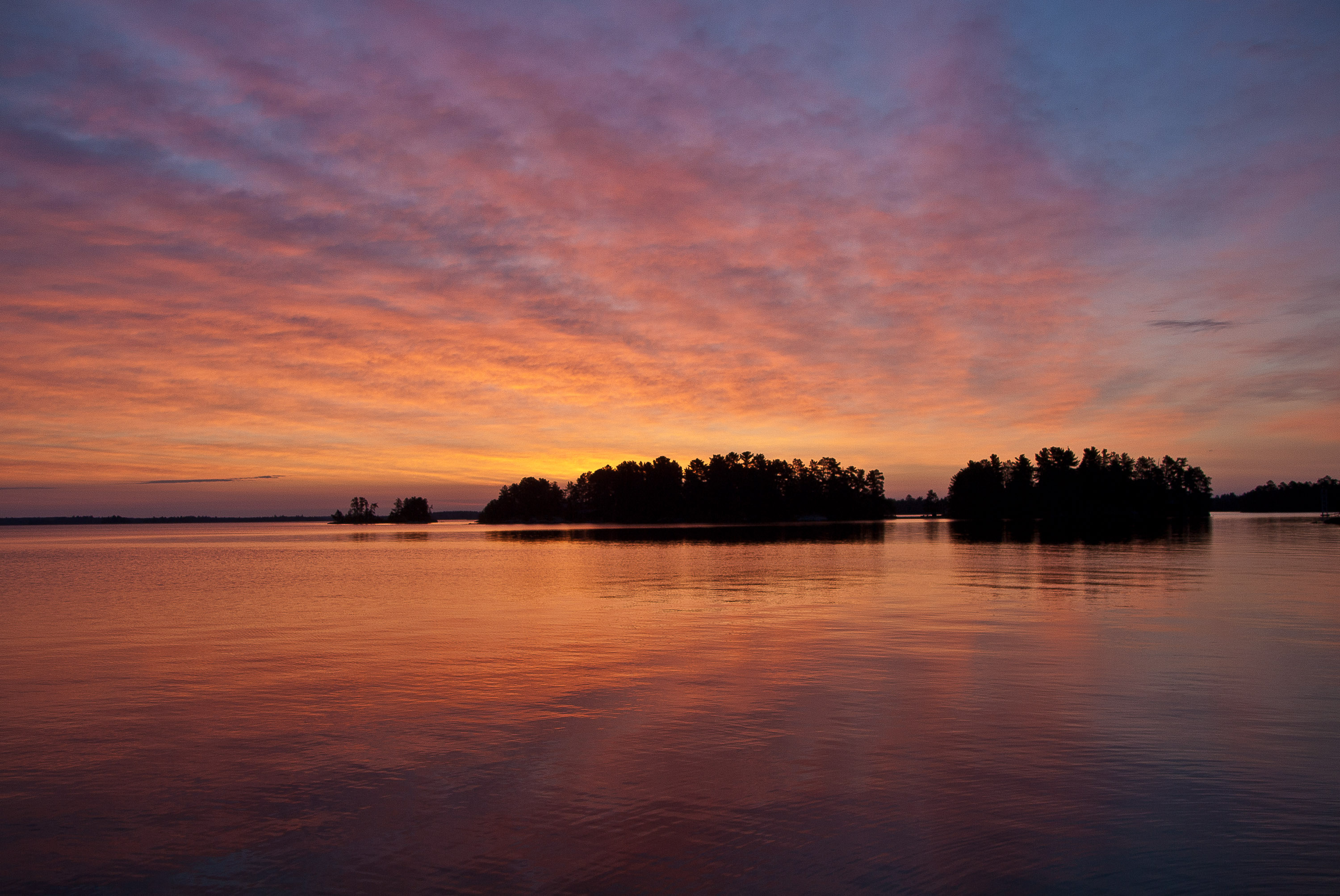
Sunrise over Rainy Lake

- Ernest Oberholtzer
- Jun Fujita Cabin
- Koochiching County, MN
- Nigigoonsiminikaaning First Nation
- Rainy River District, Ontario
- Seine River First Nation
