= Paul Clemens =

Paul Clemens may refer to:

- Paul Clemens (United States Army officer), general officer in the United States Army
- Paul Clemens (author) (born 1973), American non-fiction writer and journalist
- Paul Clemens (baseball) (born 1988), American Major League Baseball pitcher
- Paul Clemens von Baumgarten (1848–1928), German pathologist

== See also ==
- Paul Clemen (1866–1947), German art historian
- Paul Clemence (fl. 1990s–2020s) American-Brazilian photo-artist
- Paul Clement (born 1966), former United States Solicitor General
- Paul Clement (football manager) (born 1972), English professional football manager
