= Herbert L. Osgood =

American historian

Herbert Levi Osgood
- Born: April 9, 1855 Canton, Maine, US
- Died: September 11, 1918 (aged 63) New York City, US
- Occupation: Historian
- Education: Amherst College (BA); Columbia University (PhD)
- Period: 1886–1924
- Subject: American history; colonial history
- Relatives: Ernest Staples Osgood (nephew); Dixon Ryan Fox (son-in-law)

Herbert Levi Osgood (April 9, 1855 – September 11, 1918) was an American historian of colonial American history. As a professor at Columbia University he directed numerous dissertations of scholars who became major historians. Osgood was a leader of the "Imperial historians" who studied, and often praised, the inner workings of the British Empire in the 18th century.

== Biography ==
Osgood was born in Maine, and attended Amherst College, from which he graduated in 1877, having studied under John W. Burgess. He received his Master's from Amherst in 1880, took graduate classes at Yale, and spent a year in Berlin, before returning to the United States to teach at Brooklyn High School and resume graduate studies at Columbia under Burgess, who had recently moved there. Osgood received his doctorate from Columbia in 1889. He had already published two well-received articles in the journal Political Science Quarterly, which Burgess had founded in 1886: "Scientific Socialism" (Dec. 1886), and "Scientific Anarchism" (Mar. 1889)—the two articles were then put together as his doctoral dissertation.

Osgood then went to London to study documents relating to colonial America in the archives of the British Museum and the Public Record Office. Returning to the United States once more, he served as an assistant to Burgess for six years, and immediately began teaching the course on "Political History of the Colonies and the American Revolution" in 1891. In 1896, Osgood was appointed professor, in which position he remained until his death.

His son-in-law, Dixon Ryan Fox, was also a historian, as well as author of a biography of Osgood, Herbert Levi Osgood, an American scholar (1924). Additionally, his nephew Ernest Staples Osgood was a prominent historian of the American West.

== Scholarly work ==
Osgood wrote extensively on colonial American history, and his work is characterized by frequent and detailed analysis of primary sources. His work is descriptive, aimed as a careful analysis of the source material for the consumption of other historians, with little narrative running through it. In this he contrasts with Edward Channing, who wrote more popularly accessible works, but based them more on a synthesis of secondary sources. Osgood was an admirer of Leopold von Ranke, and his style is sometimes compared with the latter's. Osgood's work was criticized, even during his own lifetime, of being cold and concentrating only on institutions and facts—Dixon Ryan Fox quoted him as responding to one such critic: "...but is it the function of an historian to make history interesting?" Along with Charles McLean Andrews, George Louis Beer (who was Osgood's student at Columbia), and other Imperial School historians, he took a view of the colonial period that focused on its imperial ties with Great Britain, which he first set forth in an early article ("England and the Colonies") in Political Science Quarterly (Sept. 1887) in which he was critical of the partisanship that had characterized so many studies of that era, where the colonists had been portrayed as heroic and virtuous while the British were the forces of evil. Osgood also contributed an early article on the topic in the Annual Report of the American Historical Association for the Year 1898, as well as in an article on early American history in the famous 11th edition of the Encyclopædia Britannica.

With the help of students and some research leaves from Columbia, Osgood visited the archives in the various states and in Britain to examine the original documents. The first series that came from this work was the three-volume The American Colonies in the Seventeenth Century (1904-1907), which received favorable reviews in the academic literature. Osgood then spent years working on the four-volume sequel, The American Colonies in the Eighteenth Century, which he had all but finished at the time of his death—a chapter on slavery was yet to be written, as well as the final editing. Dixon Ryan Fox, his son-in-law, edited the manuscripts, and the set was published posthumously in 1924.

Because he had spent much of the 1890s working in various state archives, Osgood was asked to participate in the American Historical Association's Public Archives Commission project in 1900 to survey the state of records and their preservation. Osgood handled the section on New York, and while the reports on the other state records were in some cases cursory, Osgood's report was thorough, ran in length to 184 pages, and was also separately published so that libraries in New York could acquire it more easily. As a public service, Osgood also edited the eight-volume Minutes of the Common Council of the City of New York, 1675-1776 (1905), known as the "English records" to distinguish them from the earlier Dutch ones. Even while working on these various projects, Osgood continued to teach and supervise doctoral dissertations at Columbia, and among his students were William Robert Shepherd, Charles Austin Beard, and Arthur Meier Schlesinger.

Biographer Gwenda Morgan concludes:

Osgood brought a new sophistication to the study of colonial relations posing the question from an institutional perspective, of how the Atlantic was bridged. He was the first American historian to recognize the complexity of imperial structures, the experimental character of the empire, and the contradictions between theory and practice that gave rise, on both sides of the Atlantic, to inconsistencies and misunderstandings.... It was American factors rather than imperial influences that in his view shaped the development of the colonies. Osgood's work still has value for professional historians interested in the nature of the colonies' place in the early British Empire, and their internal political development.

== See also ==
- Historiography of the British Empire

== Works ==
- Osgood, Herbert L. The American colonies in the seventeenth century, (3 vol 1904-07)' vol. 1 online; vol 2 online; vol 3 online
