= John Henry Hammond (Union Army officer) =

Union Army officer (died 1890)

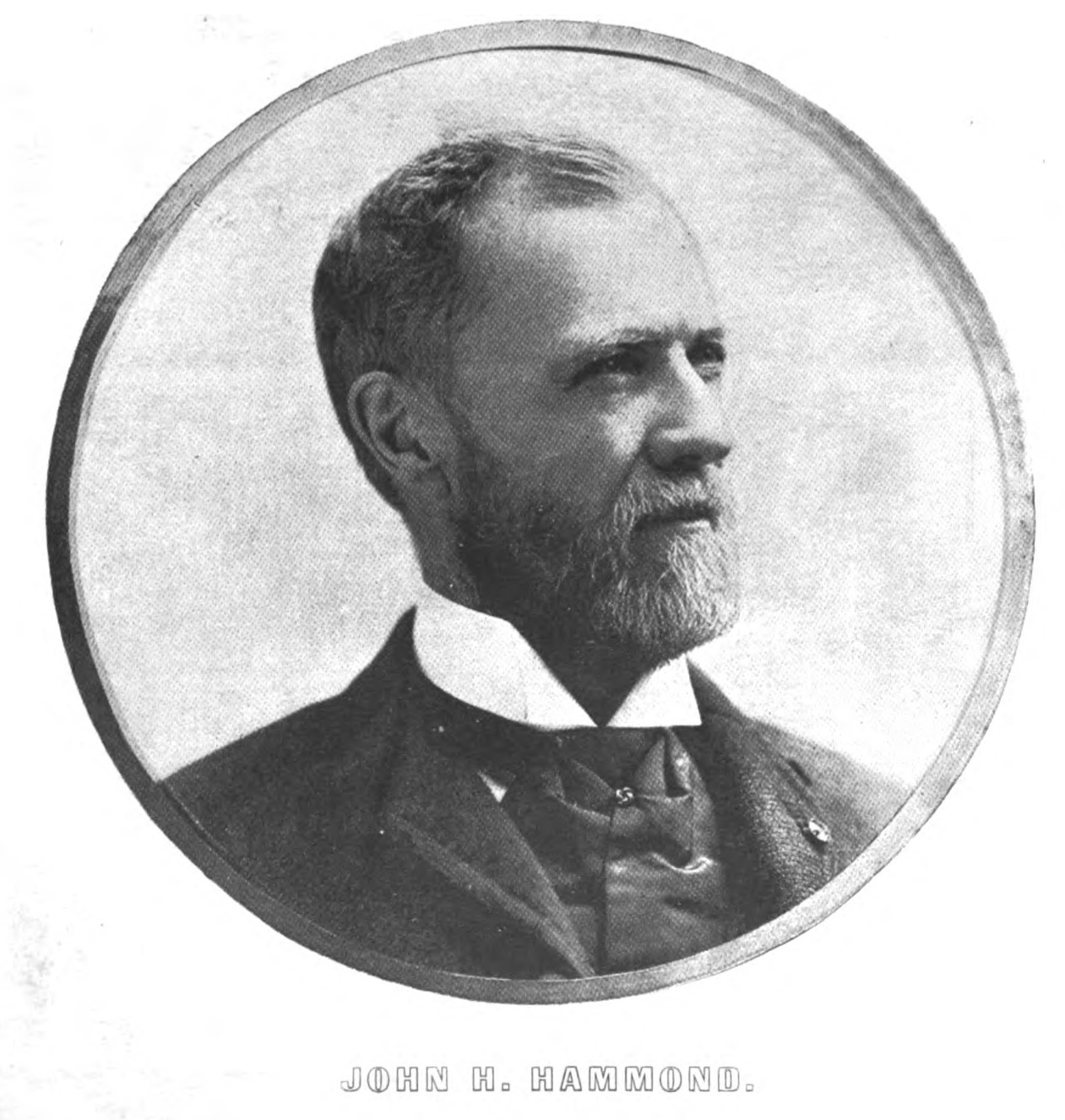
- John Henry Hammond
- Born: June 30, 1833; New York City, New York, U.S.
- Died: April 30, 1890 (aged 56); Saint Paul, Minnesota, U.S.
- Burial place: Oakland Cemetery, Saint Paul, Minnesota
- Military career
- Allegiance: United States
- Branch: Union Army
- Service years: 1861–1865
- Rank: Brevet Brigadier General
- Unit: 10th Kentucky Infantry Regiment
- Conflicts: American Civil War; Battle of Fort Donelson; Battle of Shiloh; Vicksburg campaign; Battle of Chickasaw Bayou; Chattanooga campaign; Siege of Knoxville; Franklin–Nashville campaign; Battle of Nashville

John Henry Hammond (30 June 1833 – 30 April 1890) was a Union Army officer during the American Civil War, a banking and railroad executive, and a federal official in Indian affairs for the Dakota Territory. He served on the staff of Major General William T. Sherman and was recommended for promotion by Lieutenant General Ulysses S. Grant. After the war, Hammond held federal appointments in the American West and participated in discussions regarding the surrender of Sitting Bull in 1881. During the 1880s he was involved in railroad development and land promotion at the head of Lake Superior, contributing to the early development of Superior, Wisconsin.

== Early life ==
John Henry Hammond was born on June 30, 1833, in New York City, on Chambers Street opposite City Hall Park. His father, Henry Hammond, was from Maryland, and his mother, Rachel Orr, was from near Londonderry, Ireland. After his father’s death during his childhood, the family moved to Campbell County, Kentucky.

Hammond attended preparatory school and college at Bethany, Virginia, and later studied civil engineering at the Jesuit college in Cincinnati. He worked for two years in a mercantile house in New York City before returning to Kentucky, where he was engaged in farming and land development and was associated with the founding of Clinton, Iowa.

In 1857 he traveled to Europe to complete his education and to report on vine diseases in Spain, Italy, Sicily, and southern France. He returned about two years later after the death of his mother. In 1859 he worked as a civil engineer in Tennessee, Alabama, and Texas before accepting employment in California representing eastern investors with Mexican land grants along the coast and in the Mariposa region.

== Civil War service ==
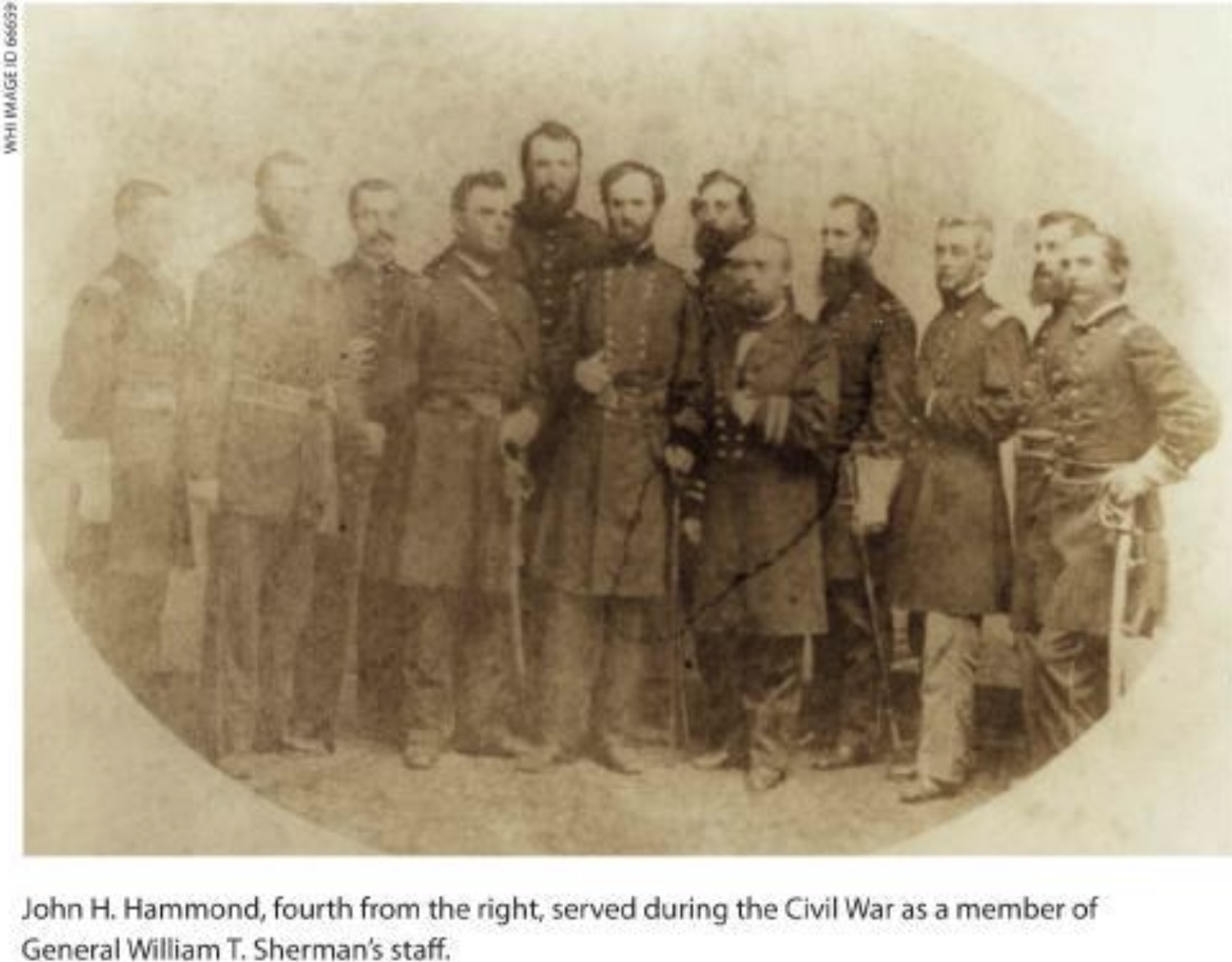
General John Henry Hammond, fourth from right, member of the staff of William Tecumseh Sherman.

Hammond entered Union service in 1861, serving as a private in volunteer units in New York and later California. According to a later biographical account, he later returned to Kentucky and joined a company that became part of the 10th Kentucky Infantry Regiment.

He came to the attention of Major General William T. Sherman and was appointed acting assistant adjutant general. On 17 November 1861 he received a commission as captain and assistant adjutant general. Serving on Sherman’s staff, Hammond participated in western theater operations including the capture of Fort Donelson and the Battle of Shiloh, where a published biographical account states that he received special mention for bravery.

In June 1862 he was promoted to major and adjutant general, and in December 1862 to lieutenant colonel and assistant adjutant general and chief of staff. In these capacities he was involved in major western theater operations including the Vicksburg campaign and siege of Corinth, the First Battle of Memphis, the Battle of Chickasaw Bayou, the Chattanooga campaign, and the siege of Knoxville.

In December 1863 Major-General John A. Logan, recommending him for promotion, wrote: "Although a Staff Officer, he has established an excellent reputation for ability in action. He has enterprise, zeal in the cause, and personal bravery, and great perseverance." In the same month Edwin M. Stanton, Secretary of War, agreed to transfer Hammond to command a cavalry regiment as colonel.

In July 1864, Lieutenant General Ulysses S. Grant wrote to Abraham Lincoln recommending Hammond for promotion to brigadier general, citing his service and his role in recruiting three African American regiments in Kentucky: "He is one of the most industrious, indefatigable and bravest men I have ever seen in action." Although the recommendation was not immediately acted upon, Hammond received a brevet appointment as brigadier general of volunteers on 31 October 1864.

Later in 1864 he served in the Cavalry Corps during the Franklin–Nashville campaign under Major General George H. Thomas, including participation in the Battle of Nashville in December 1864.

On 10 November 1864, Hammond married Sophia Vernon Wolfe, daughter of Hon. Nathaniel Wolfe, who served for many years as Attorney General of Kentucky. Wolfe had been a member of a state committee appointed to determine whether Kentucky should remain in the Union at the outset of the Civil War.

Hammond was honorably mustered out of the army on 23 August 1865, six months after the end of the Civil War.

== Railroad and business career ==
After being mustered out in 1865, Hammond purchased a plantation in Mississippi but soon relocated to Chillicothe, Missouri. There he became president of the Chillicothe & Brunswick Railroad and later assisted in organizing the St. Louis, Council Bluffs & Omaha Railroad, which was subsequently incorporated into the Wabash, St. Louis & Pacific system.

In 1874 he resigned to assume management of the Macon and Brunswick Railroad, Atlantic and Gulf Railroad (1856-79) and its branch lines in Georgia and Alabama. He remained in that position until 1875, when malaria caught during his Civil War service compelled him to move north.

In 1876 President Rutherford B. Hayes appointed Hammond Inspector of Indian Agencies. After completing that service, he settled in Evanston, Illinois, where he engaged in banking and other business ventures.

In 1880 he became secretary and treasurer, and later president, of the Manitoba & Southwestern Railway, overseeing construction and equipment of the line before its eventual incorporation into the Canadian Pacific Railway system.

== Indian Affairs service ==
Following the war, Hammond was employed by the Bureau of Indian Affairs as an inspector of agencies in the West.

In 1877, he was appointed Superintendent of Indian Affairs for the Dakota Territory. According to History of Dakota Territory, his investigations of Indian agency officials and traders generated controversy and resulted in indictments that were later dismissed or unsuccessful in court.

Hammond is described in history books as participating in federal discussions surrounding the expected surrender of Sitting Bull in 1881. Hammond was among those who did not think that Sitting Bull should receive unfair treatment after his arrest for involvement in the Battle of the Little Bighorn, and indicated that he would use his political connections in Washington, D.C. to ensure that Sitting Bull could surrender at Fort Buford without fear.

== Development of Superior, Wisconsin ==
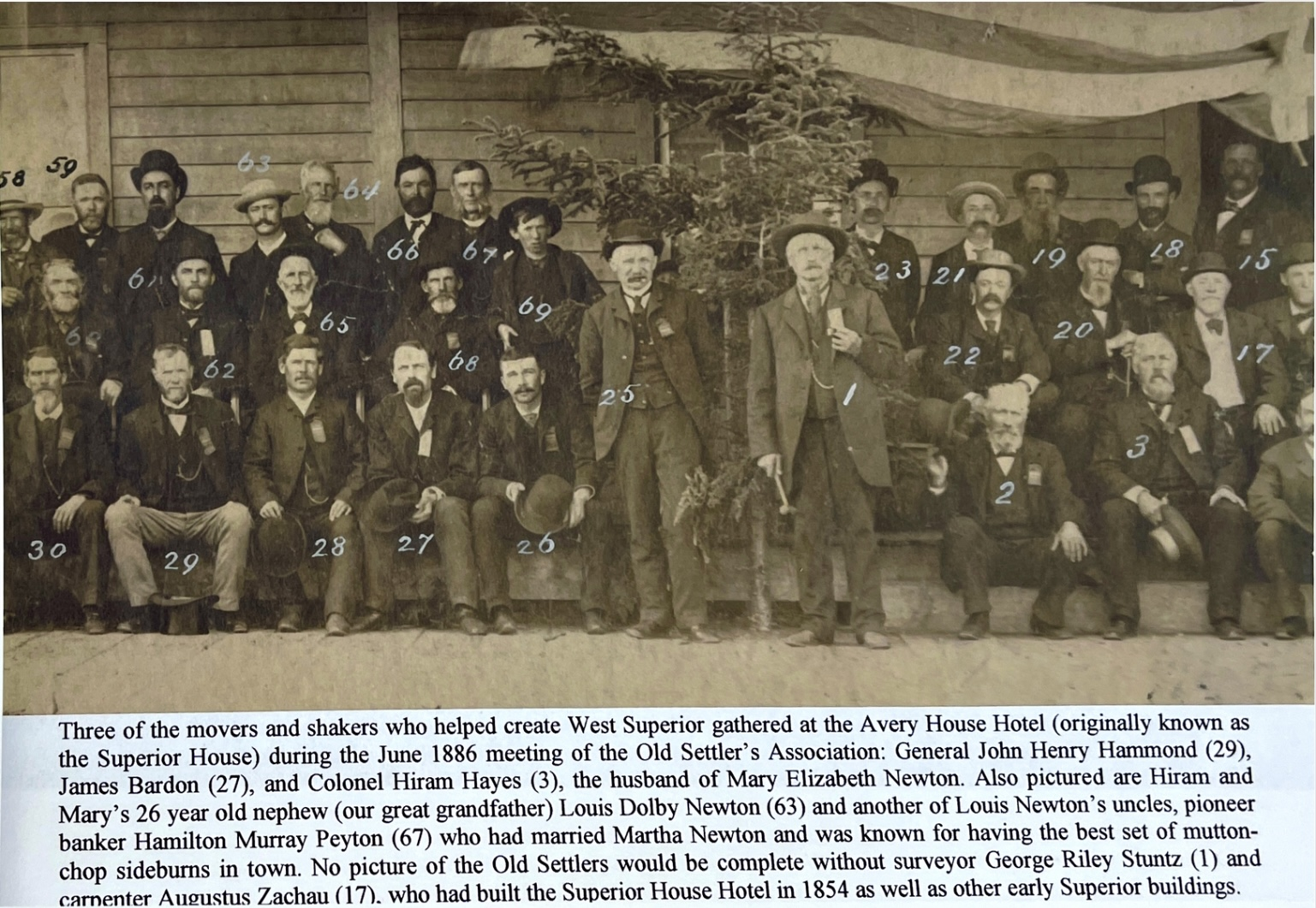
1886 Old Settler's Association of West Superior, Wisconsin featuring General John Henry Hammond among other founders.

In 1878, Hammond traveled to the head of Lake Superior with the intention of establishing a city. In an 1890 local history, Frank A. Flower wrote that Hammond came “for the purpose of making a city”, and the same account describes his later role in the development of what became West Superior in Superior, Wisconsin. Hammond investigated development opportunities at the head of Lake Superior, focusing on the Wisconsin side of the St. Louis River. He acquired land holdings in the area and promoted rail connections to the head of the lakes.

In April 1883 the Land and River Improvement Company was incorporated in New Jersey, with Hammond serving as manager. The company purchased several thousand acres and laid out streets and avenues in what became the city of Superior, Wisconsin. Hammond worked to attract railroad connections and industrial enterprises to the developing community during the 1880s.

== Death and legacy ==
Hammond died on 30 April 1890 in Saint Paul, Minnesota at the age of 56 and is buried in Oakland Cemetery. In July 1912 the city of Superior, Wisconsin opened Hammond Park, in memory of the former soldier. Hammond's two sons paid for a fountain in the park, which is next to Hammond Avenue.

Some time after his death, in January 1953, the Minnesota Historical Society (MHS) received a telephone call from Mrs. Vaclav Vytlacil, Hammond's granddaughter, to tell them about some papers held in a rolltop desk, in the attic of the family home in Saint Paul. In addition to Hammond's papers the MHS found a tight bundle wrapped in a copy of a Washington, D.C. newspaper dated 1805. Upon further inspection it turned out to be the original diary of the American explorer William Clark, now generally known as The field notes of Captain William Clark, 1803-1805. These were edited by Ernest Staples Osgood and published in 1964 by Yale University. Osgood described this find as "an ingot of gold in a bale of hay." There was a legal battle over the papers' ownership, instigated by the Hammond family, which lasted several years. The Clark Field Notes, are now held at the Beinecke Rare Book and Manuscript Library.

He was the father of Ogden H. Hammond and John Henry Hammond (1871–1949), the grandfather of music producer John Henry Hammond II, and the great-grandfather of blues musician John P. Hammond.
