= Dixon Ryan Fox =

American educator

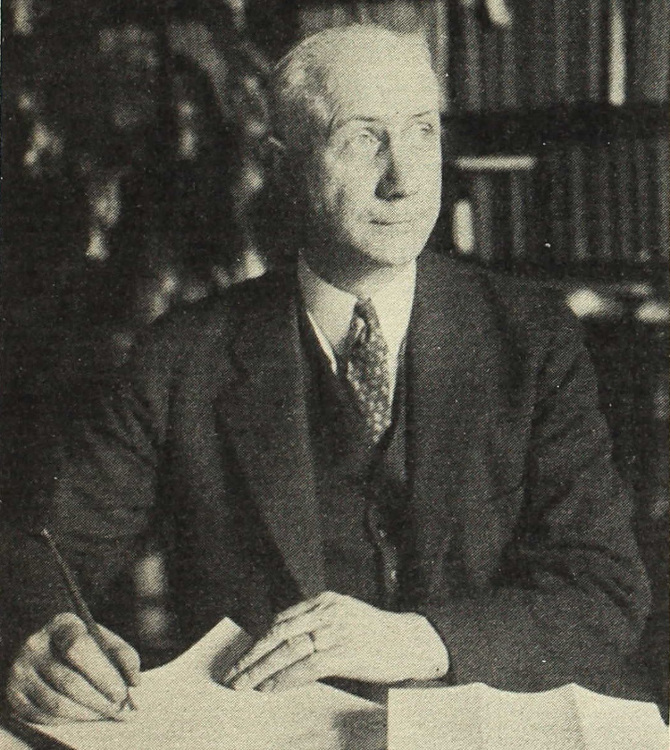
- Fox, c. 1932
- Born: December 7, 1887; Potsdam, New York, U.S.
- Died: January 30, 1945 (aged 57); Schenectady, New York, U.S.
- Burial place: Sleepy Hollow Cemetery, New York, U.S.
- Education: Columbia College (BA); Columbia University (PhD)
- Occupations: Educator, Researcher, College President
- Spouse: Marian Stickney Osgood (m. 1915)
- Children: 2 sons

12th President of Union College
- In office 1934 – January 30, 1945
- Preceded by: Frank Parker Day
- Succeeded by: Carter Davidson

Dixon Ryan Fox (December 7, 1887 – January 30, 1945) was an American educator, researcher, and president of Union College, New York from 1934 until his death in 1945.

Fox graduated from Columbia College in 1911 where he was a member of the Philolexian Society.

He took his Ph.D. in history at Columbia University where he was influenced by James Harvey Robinson, Charles A. Beard and Herbert L. Osgood. He married Osgood's daughter and taught at Columbia from 1912 to the mid-1930s.

His academic work focused on social history and American social, political and economic elite and power structures, especially as they relate to immigration, ethnic conflict and national identity.

Fox's publications have been reprinted due to their prescient nature, including The Decline of Aristocracy in the Politics of New York (1919, repr. 1971); a biography of Herbert L. Osgood (his father-in-law); and Yankees and Yorkers (1940, 1989). With Arthur M. Schlesinger, Sr., he was co-editor of the series A History of American Life.

Dixon was elected to the American Philosophical Society in 1935.
