= Superior, Wisconsin =

City and county seat of Douglas County, Wisconsin

Superior, Wisconsin Gete-oodenaang (Ojibwe)
- City
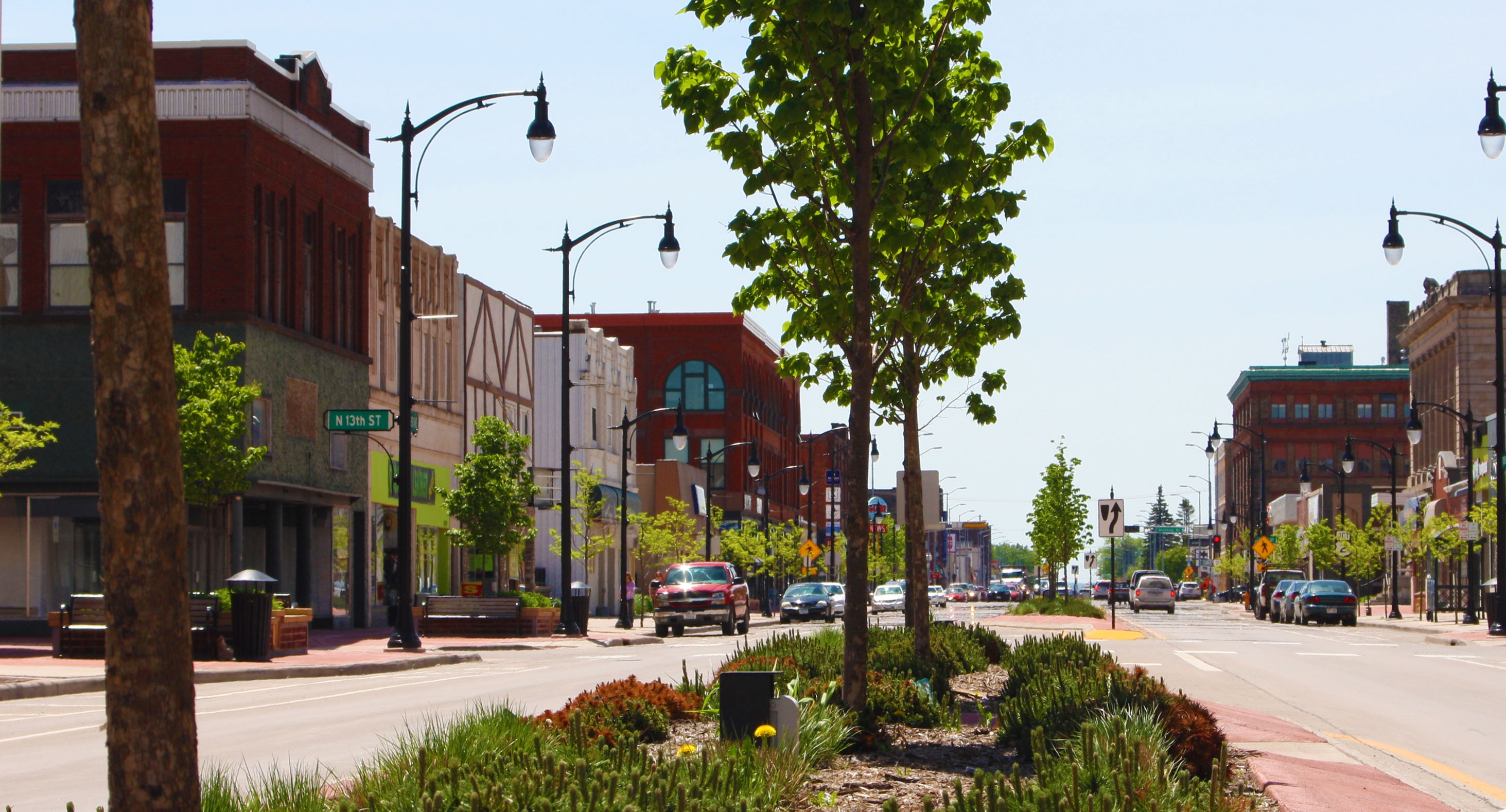
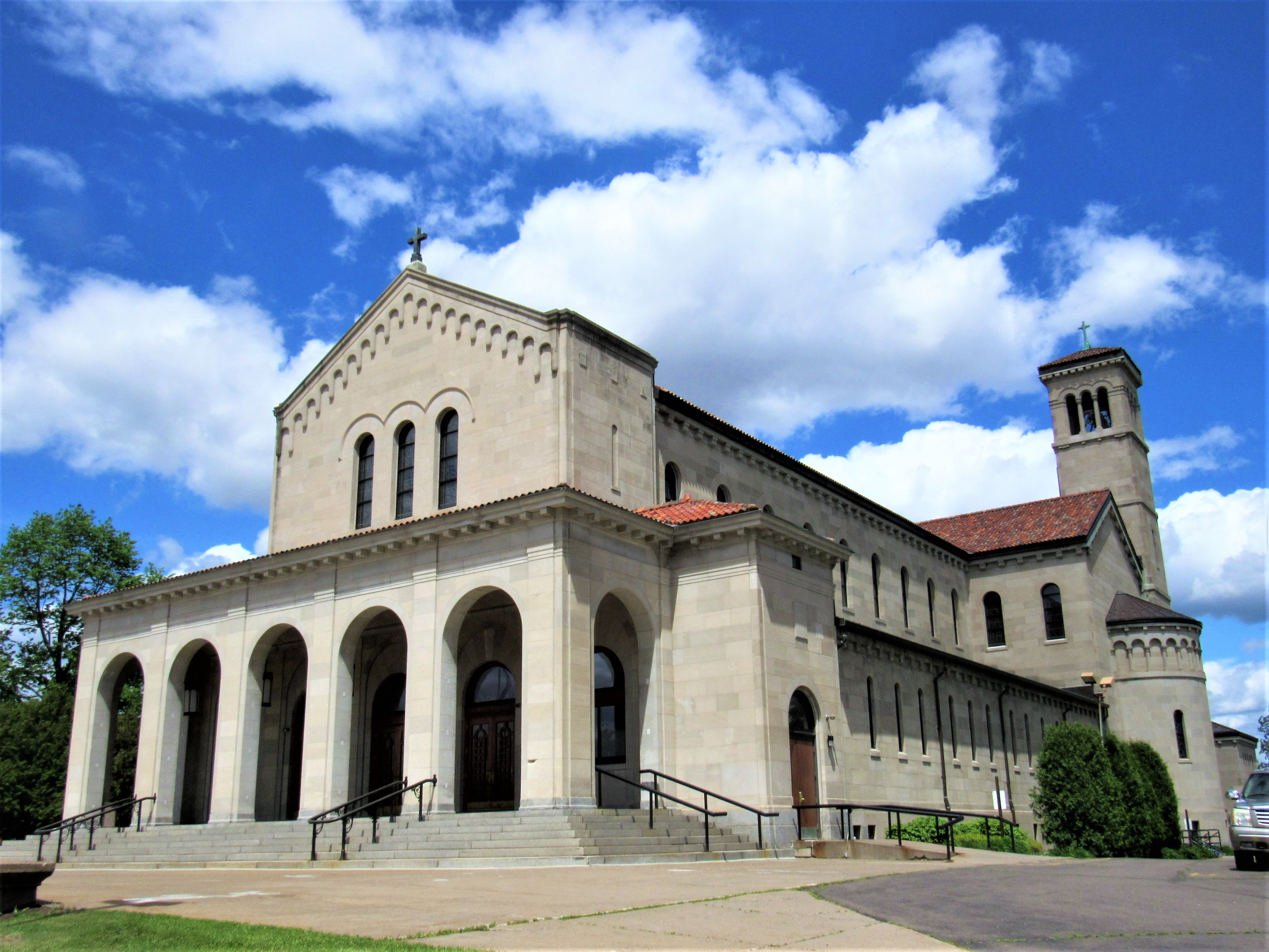
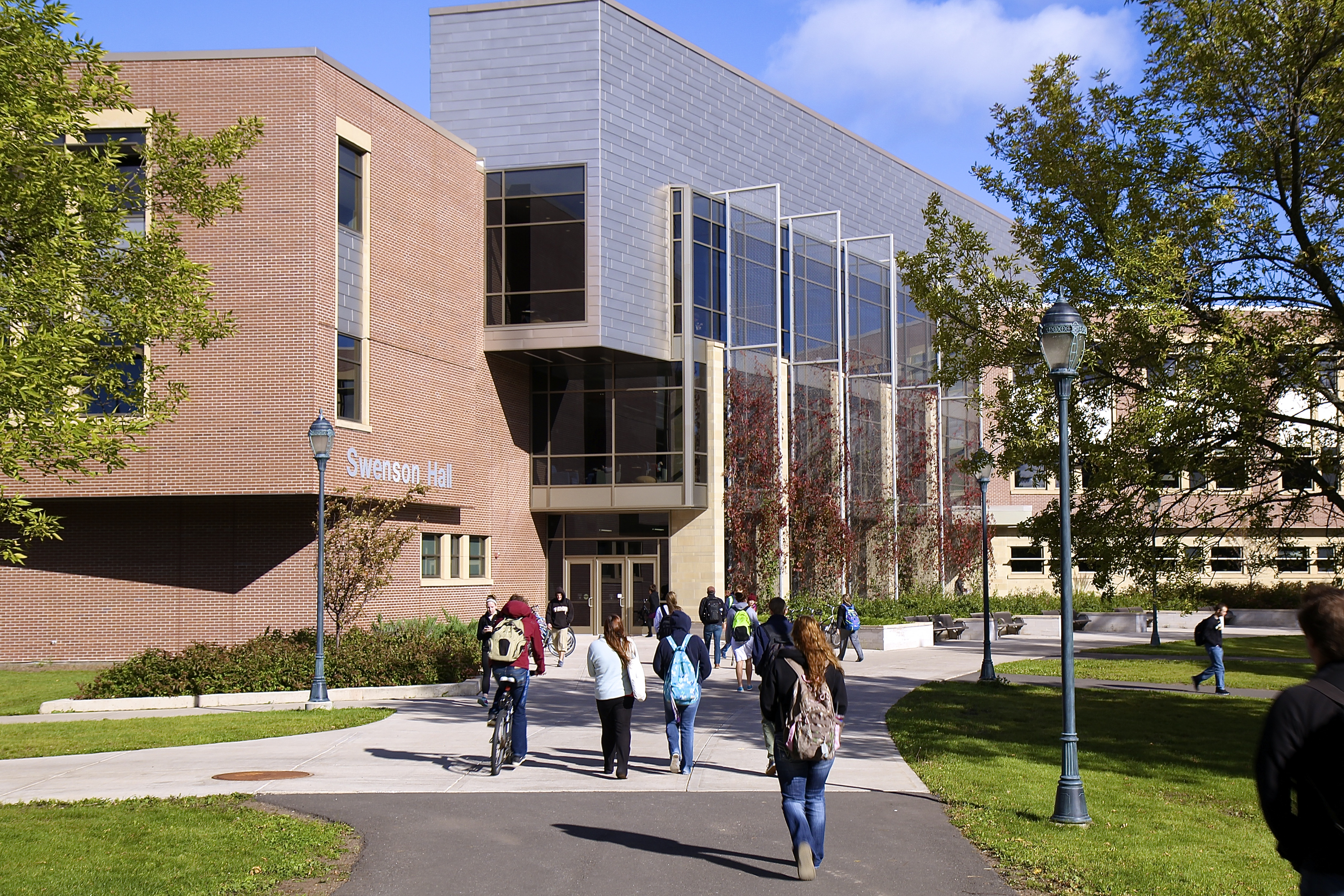
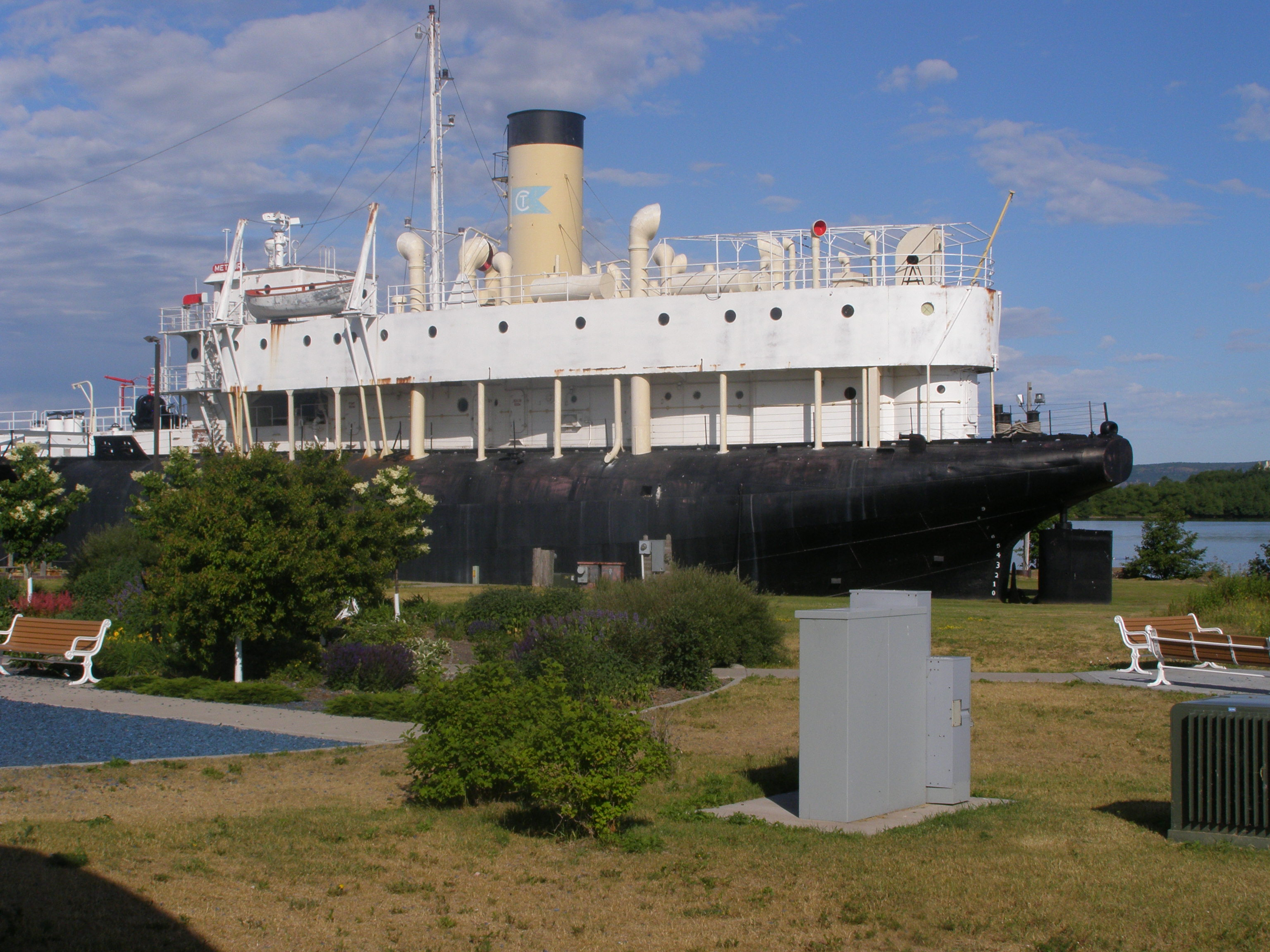
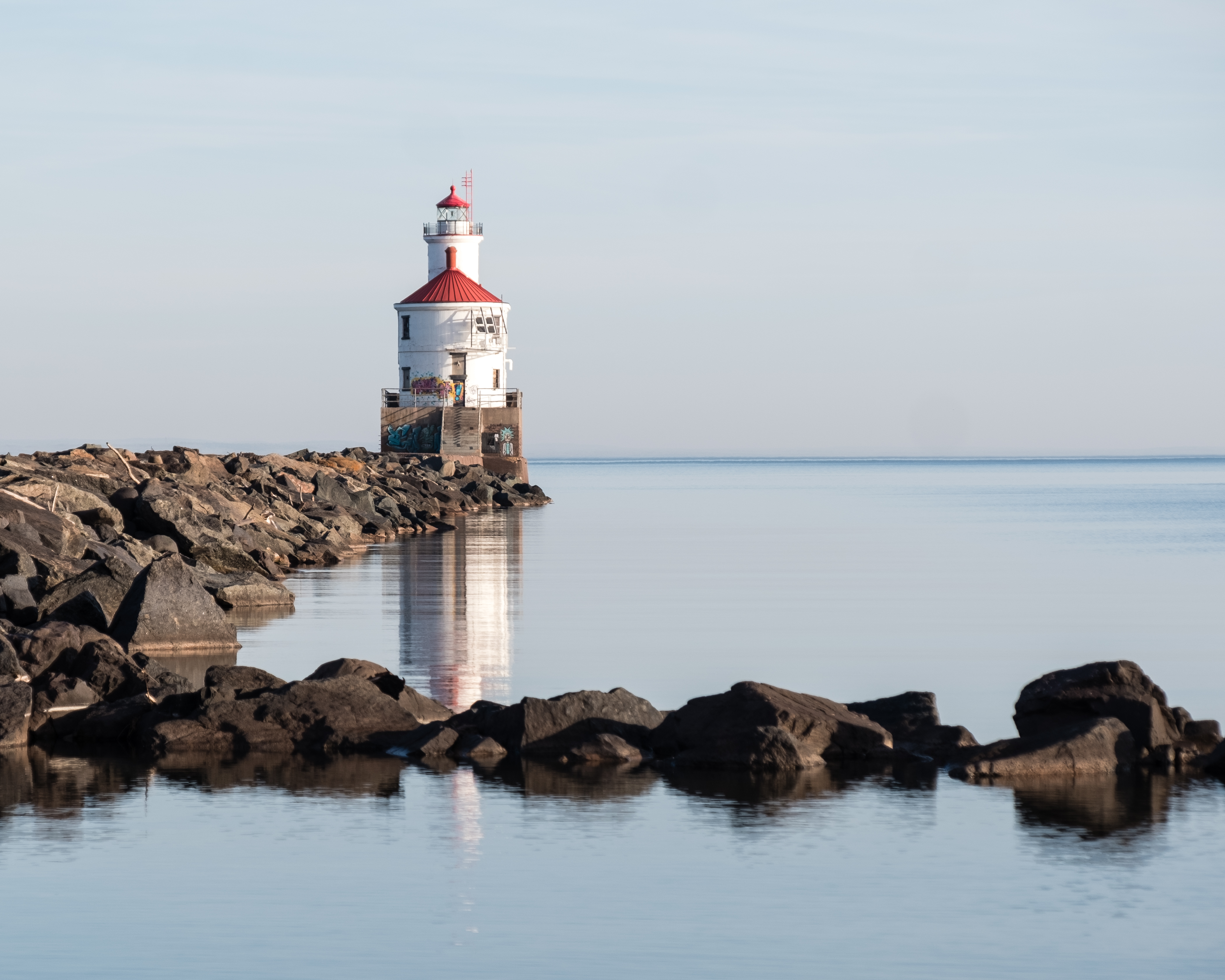
- Downtown Superior Cathedral of Christ the King University of Wisconsin–Superior SS Meteor Maritime Museum Wisconsin Point Lighthouse
- Nickname: Twin Ports (with Duluth)
- Motto: Living up to our name
- Interactive map of Superior, Wisconsin
- Location within Wisconsin Location within the United States
- Coordinates: 46°43′14″N 92°06′14″W
- Country: United States
- State: Wisconsin
- County: Douglas
- Founded: November 6, 1854
- Organized as a village: August 27, 1887
- Incorporated as a city: March 25, 1889

Government
  - Mayor: Jim Paine

Area
  - Total: 45.36 sq mi (117.47 km^{2})
  - Land: 36.62 sq mi (94.85 km^{2})
  - Water: 8.74 sq mi (22.63 km^{2})

Population (2020)
  - Total: 26,751
  - Density: 709.3/sq mi (273.88/km^{2})
- Time zone: UTC−6 (CST)
  - Summer (DST): UTC−5 (CDT)
- ZIP codes: 54880
- Area codes: 715 and 534
- FIPS code: 55-78650
- Website: www.superiorwi.gov

Superior is a city in Douglas County, Wisconsin, United States, and its county seat. The population was 26,751 at the 2020 census. Superior and nearby Duluth, Minnesota, sit at the western tip of Lake Superior and together form the Twin Ports, a major Great Lakes harbor.

Bordered by Saint Louis, Superior, and Allouez bays, the city is framed by two rivers: the Nemadji and the Saint Louis. Superior is at the junction of U.S. Route 2 and U.S. Route 53 immediately north of, and adjacent to, both the Village of Superior and the Town of Superior. It is an industrial city, with ship harbors along two sides, several large rail yards, an oil refinery, and a shipyard. Superior and neighboring Duluth feature museum ships (SS William A. Irvin in Duluth and SS Meteor in Superior), devoted to the local maritime heritage. Superior was the final port of call for SS Edmund Fitzgerald before her sinking on November 10, 1975.

== History ==
The first log cabin in Superior was erected in September 1853 on the banks of the Nemadji River, at the same time that ground was broken for construction of the locks and ship canal at Sault Ste. Marie, Michigan. This was intended to allow ships to bypass the rapids at that site. Superior was founded as a settlement in 1854. A village government was organized on August 27, 1887, and Superior was incorporated as a city on March 25, 1889. Around the same time Superior became the seat of newly formed Douglas County, Wisconsin. Immediately there was eagerness for a railroad from Lake Superior to the Pacific Coast, and investment flowed in, but then the Panic of 1857 hit, investment slowed, and the population of the new city collapsed from 2500 to 500.

Twenty-five years later the Northern Pacific Railway and other rail lines finally arrived, fulfilling the dream of a rail and water highway from coast to coast. In 1883 General John Henry Hammond formed the Land and River Improvement Company, which developed much of West Superior, including the West Superior Iron and Steel plant. Numerous grain, coal and lumber businesses formed in the same period.

In the Boom Period from 1888 to 1892, Land and River Improvement and others built architect-designed business blocks on Tower Avenue, seeing Superior as the "new Chicago". Many of the investors were from out East, so the buildings received names like the New Jersey Block and the Maryland Block. By 1892, population was 34,000. Then the Panic of 1893 hit, and development slowed again.

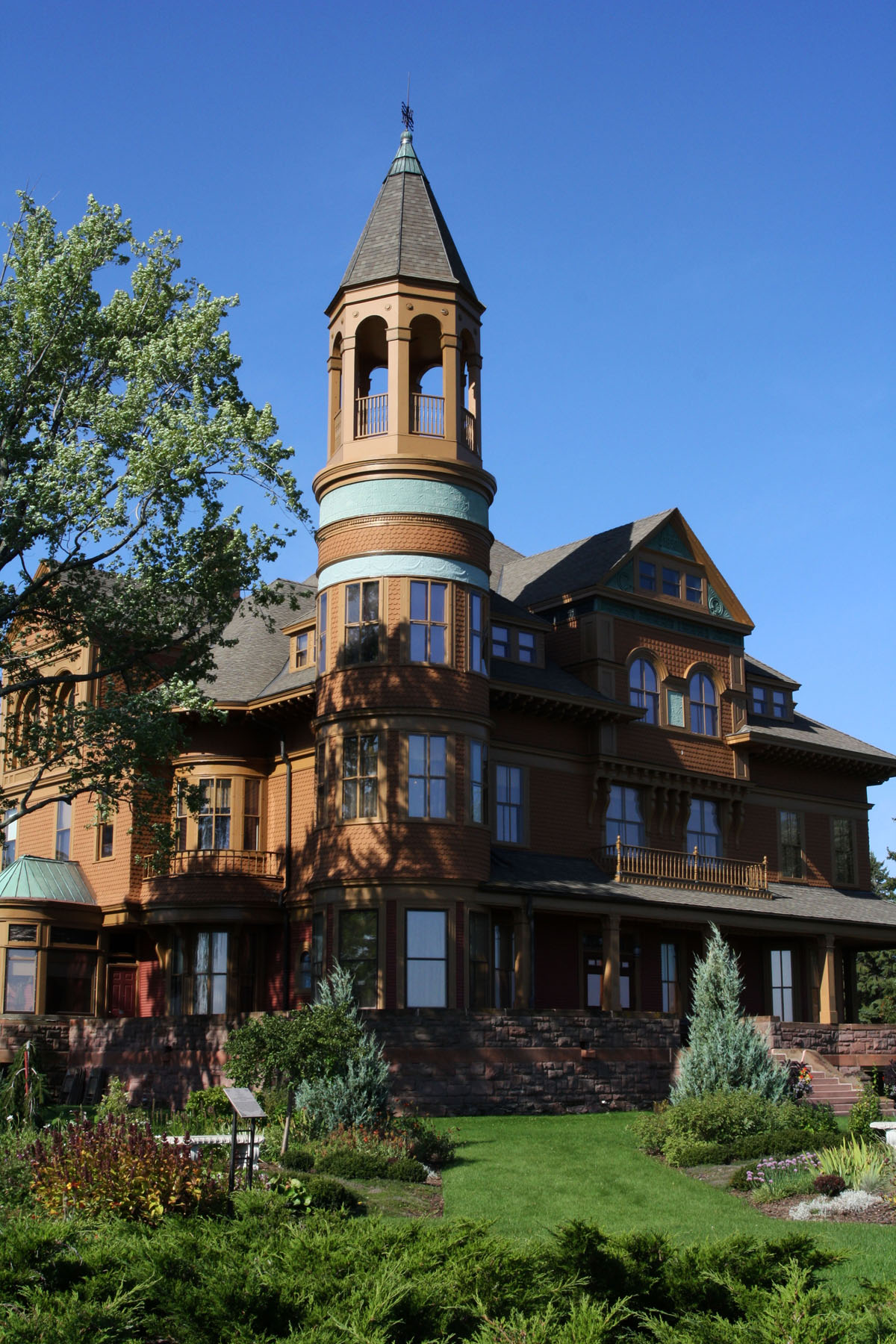
Fairlawn Mansion, built by Superior's three-time mayor Martin Pattison for his family in 1891. The 42-room mansion is now a museum.

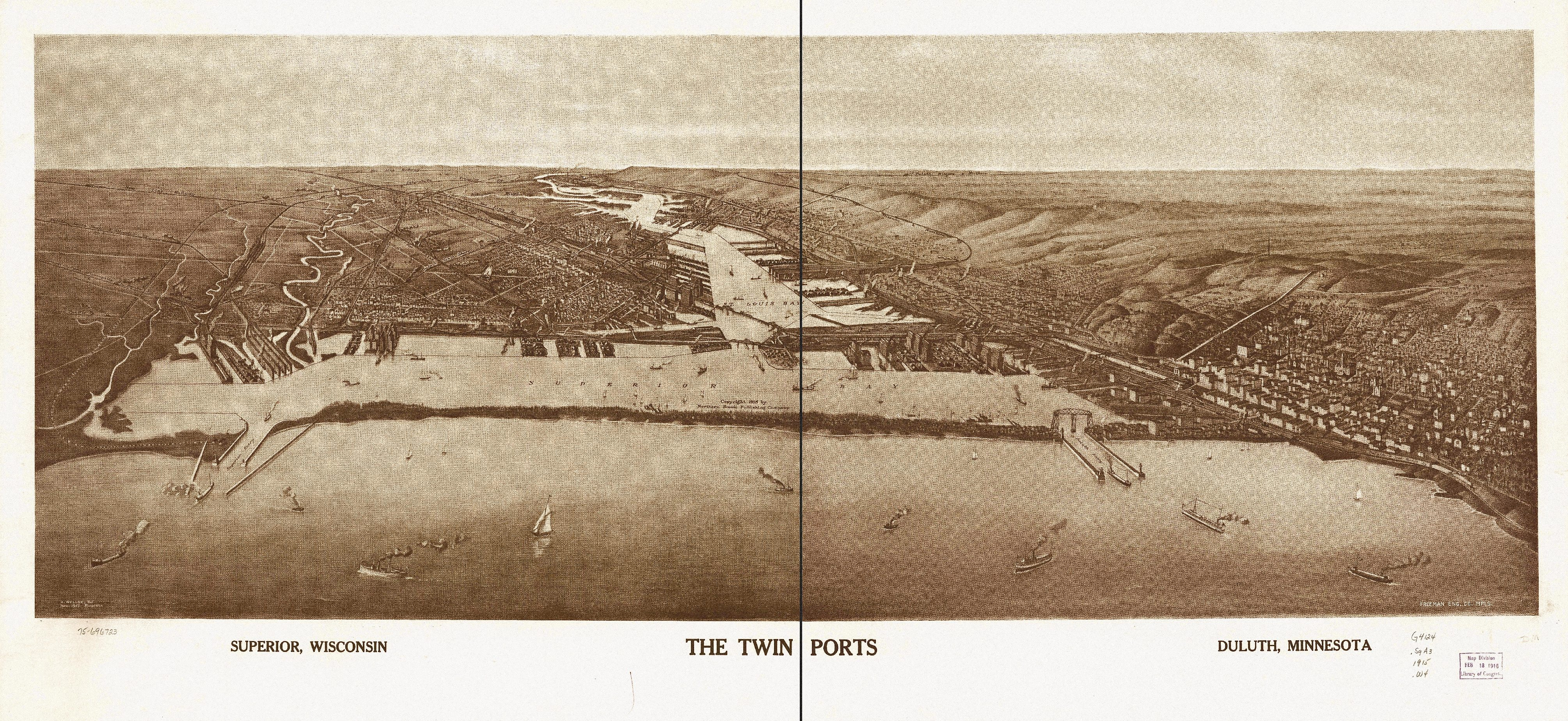
1915 panoramic map of the Twin Ports, Superior on the left and Duluth on the right

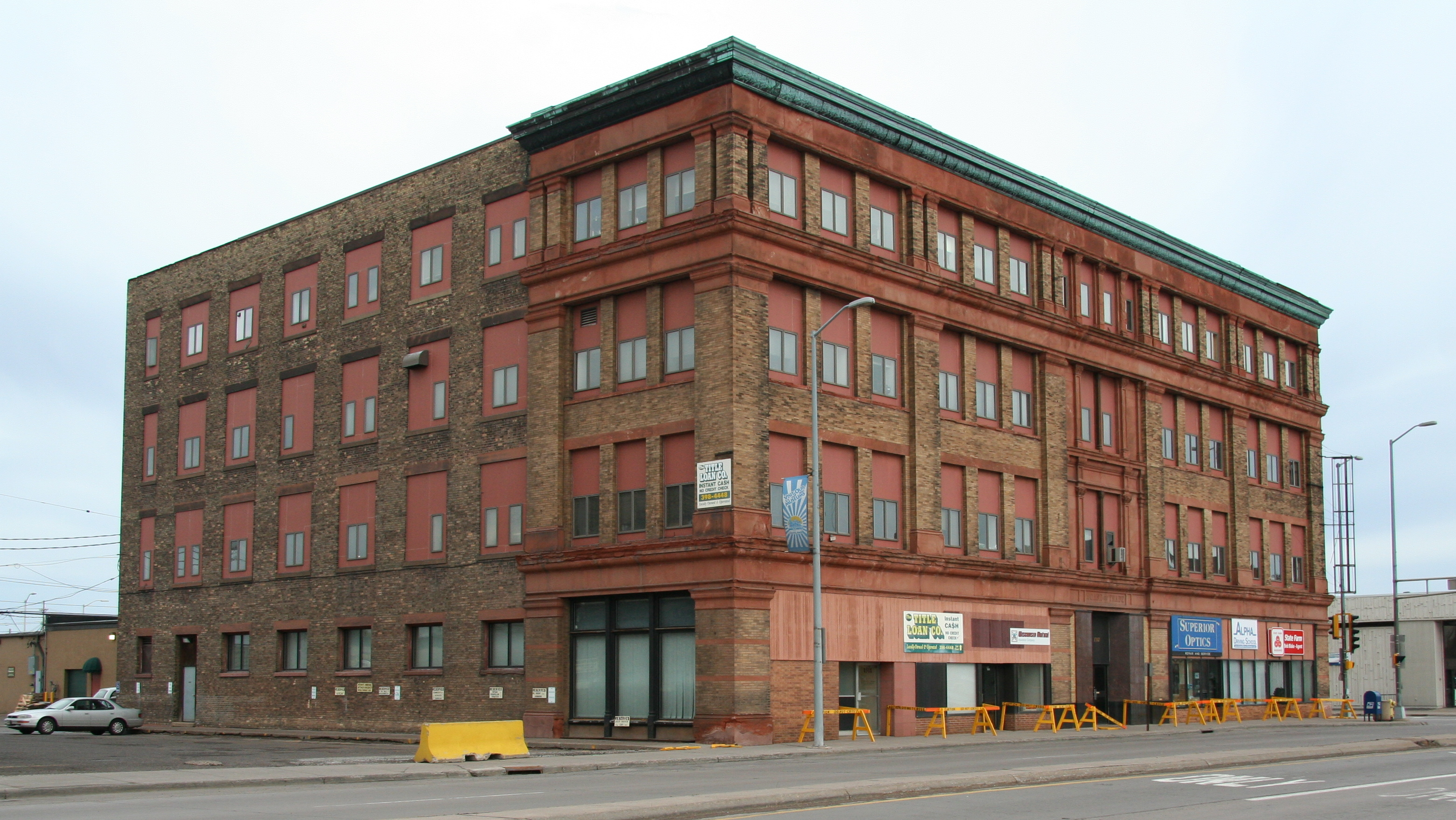
Minnesota Block (Board of Trade Building), built 1892

=== Pre-settlement context ===
Prior to Euro-American settlement, the site of present-day Superior formed part of the Ojibwe (Anishinaabe) homeland at the Head of the Lakes, with activity centered along the St. Louis River estuary and Nemadji River.

The opening of this land to United States survey and settlement followed the Treaty of La Pointe (1842) and Treaty of La Pointe (1854), through which the Ojibwe ceded territory in northern Wisconsin. These agreements facilitated the federal surveys conducted in 1853, leading to the subsequent establishment of a townsite at the Head of the Lakes, which ultimately resulted in the founding of Superior. Documented collections of Ojibwe place names within the treaty-ceded territories also record an Ojibwe name for Superior, Gete-oodenaang (glossed as "at the old town").

=== Survey and founding (1853–1854) ===
In 1853, the federal government commissioned surveys of the Head of the Lakes region as part of broader efforts to identify transportation routes and potential townsites in northern Wisconsin. Surveyor George R. Stuntz mapped the shoreline and river mouths near the Nemadji River and reported that the Wisconsin side of the harbor offered space for docks and settlement. His findings drew the attention of land promoters connected to railroad interests in Minnesota and Illinois.

Later that year, Joseph Bullen and John Talleyrand Morgan traveled from St. Paul, Minnesota to the Nemadji River to establish a townsite. Their route followed an overland trail through swamp and forest that later became known as the Military Road. On June 30, 1853, they selected a location near the river mouth and marked claims for what would become the town of Superior.

The first plat of Superior was filed in 1854. It reflected expectations that a transcontinental railroad would terminate at the Head of the Lakes and that shipping traffic would pass through the natural harbor. Although these expectations were speculative, they shaped the town's early layout and attracted settlers, merchants, and investors during the following decade.

=== Early settlement and immigration (1854–1870) ===
Following the filing of the town plat in 1854, settlement proceeded slowly. Early arrivals included traders, lumber workers, and families connected to river and harbor activity. Small frame buildings were erected near the Nemadji River and along the bay, and a rudimentary dock supported lake traffic during the shipping season.

Stephen Bungo, a frontiersman of mixed Ojibwa and African American ancestry, was among the early residents of Superior and participated in civic and community life during the town's formative years. Nineteenth-century newspaper accounts describe his involvement in local political meetings, including appearances before the county board, while later historical articles identified him as a longtime resident associated with early settlement at the Head of the Lakes. Bungo worked as an interpreter and was connected with early religious organization in the community, including the founding of Methodist institutions in Superior. In retrospective accounts, he was described as having claimed to be "the first white man" at the Head of the Lakes, a statement reflecting contemporary attitudes that was later noted in local histories. His legacy was later commemorated in Superior through historical articles, a monument dedication, and community observances such as "Stephen Bungo Day."

By the late 1850s and 1860s, immigrants from Norway, Sweden, Germany, Cornwall, and eastern Canada joined American settlers from Minnesota and Illinois. Many worked in lumbering, fishing, or small-scale commerce. Settlement patterns tended to follow occupational and family networks, with Scandinavian families settling near one another and Cornish miners establishing homes near higher ground west of the bay.

Economic growth was uneven during this period. National financial downturns, including the Panic of 1857, slowed development. Nonetheless, the population increased gradually, and local institutions began to form, laying the groundwork for later municipal organization.

=== Early newspapers and civic institutions (1860s–1870s) ===
By the 1860s, local newspapers began operating in Superior. Early publications included the Superior Chronicle and later the Superior Times. These papers reported on shipping activity, land sales, and regional politics, and they often promoted the advantages of settlement at the Head of the Lakes.

Municipal organization developed gradually. For much of the period, services such as road maintenance and fire response were handled informally or through county structures. As population increased, residents petitioned for clearer civic administration and local governance. By the 1870s, the settlement had begun to adopt more formal procedures for taxation, public works, and record keeping.

=== Faith and religious institutions (1854–1870s) ===
Religious organizations formed soon after settlement. Catholic missionaries were among the earliest clergy to visit the area, and St. Francis Xavier parish was established during the 1850s. Protestant congregations followed, including Presbyterian, Episcopal, and later Scandinavian Lutheran churches serving Norwegian and Swedish immigrants.

As the population increased, congregations built permanent structures and established regular services. These institutions provided social organization in addition to religious practice and became part of the emerging civic framework of the settlement.

During the 1860s and 1870s additional Protestant denominations organized congregations, including Methodist, Baptist, and Congregational churches. Many early services were initially held in private homes, temporary halls, or shared buildings before permanent church structures were constructed. Immigration patterns influenced the development of Lutheran congregations, with Norwegian, Swedish, and later Finnish settlers establishing churches that reflected language and ethnic identity.

Catholic parish life expanded as immigration from Ireland, Germany, and Poland increased in the latter nineteenth century. Parochial schools were later established in connection with several parishes, reflecting the growing stability of Catholic institutions in the community.

=== Economic rivalry and setback (1870s) ===
During the 1870s, development at the Head of the Lakes was shaped by competition between Superior and neighboring Duluth. Both communities sought railroad connections and control of harbor facilities. Promoters in each city advanced plans to attract investment and secure transportation links to the interior.

The Panic of 1873 significantly slowed growth in Superior. Railroad expansion stalled, land sales declined, and several planned improvements were postponed. Duluth obtained key rail connections during this period, which affected commercial traffic patterns in the region. Superior's population growth slowed as a result, and many early expectations about rapid expansion were not realized during the decade.

=== Renewed development and incorporation (1880–1889) ===
Economic activity increased in Superior during the 1880s as railroad construction resumed and regional iron mining expanded. Harbor improvements and dock construction supported shipping traffic on Lake Superior. Land development companies renewed efforts to promote settlement and commercial investment at the Head of the Lakes.

In 1882 eastern investors organized the Superior Land and River Improvement Company to acquire and develop lands along St. Louis and Superior Bays. General John Henry Hammond directed field operations during the company's early years, overseeing surveys and platting, grading of streets, clearing of acreage, and establishment of dock lines and terminals. The company promoted rail connections and waterfront access to support ore shipments and industrial growth. Corporate leadership later shifted to Francis Henry Weeks, who continued large-scale development following Hammond's tenure.

Hammond also participated in efforts to secure federal harbor improvements. In the mid-1880s he traveled to Washington, D.C., with local representatives to obtain a War Department order requiring a navigable draw in the Northern Pacific bridge over the St. Louis River, preserving access to Superior's channel. Subsequent dredging and dock construction expanded the city's shipping capacity and reinforced its position within the regional iron and grain trade.

Population increased during the decade, and municipal organization advanced toward formal city status. On March 25, 1889, the Wisconsin State Legislature incorporated the City of Superior, consolidating previously separate jurisdictions under a single municipal government.

Jewish immigrants also settled in Superior during the 1880s, many arriving from Lithuania and other parts of Eastern Europe. The Hebrew Brotherhood Congregation (est. 1890) and the Superior Hebrew Congregation (est. 1895) later constructed synagogues across from one another at the intersection of North Sixth Street and Hammond Avenue in 1905 and 1907. By the early twentieth century, the Jewish population in the city numbered in the hundreds.

=== Growth, eastern investment, and the Panic of 1893 (1890–1900) ===
Following the incorporation of the City of Superior in 1889, development continued under the Superior Land and River Improvement Company and related railroad and industrial interests. General Hammond died in 1890, after which the company's leadership and operations continued under its corporate officers and managers, including Francis Henry Weeks (president) and Rowland J. Wemyss (general manager).

Superior's late nineteenth-century boom drew capital from eastern investors. The Wisconsin Magazine of History describes how James Roosevelt I helped capitalize the West Superior Iron and Steel Company by investing himself and raising additional funds from business associates, and it notes that Roosevelt made multiple trips to Superior during the period when the iron-and-steel and related shipbuilding enterprises were being promoted. Contemporary accounts cited in the article describe the wake from a whaleback launch soaking spectators and nearly drowning Roosevelt's young son, Franklin D. Roosevelt, during one of these visits.

The same article reports that Francis H. Weeks, while serving as president of the Land and River Improvement Company, transferred more than $500,000 from the company into the Iron and Steel Company without the knowledge of Land and River officials, and that the Panic of 1893 exposed broader financial misconduct tied to Weeks's handling of investor funds. It further notes that Weeks was deposed from leadership, fled abroad, later returned to the United States, and was tried and convicted (on a single count of robbery), receiving a ten-year hard-labor sentence at Sing Sing. The article describes James Roosevelt's subsequent visits as including efforts to reassure Superior residents and stabilize confidence in the industrial venture after Weeks's removal.

== Geography ==
According to the United States Census Bureau, the city has a total area of 55.65 sq mi (144.13 km^{2}), of which 36.96 sq mi (95.73 km^{2}) is land and 18.69 sq mi (48.41 km^{2}) is water. Most of Superior is level, with a gradual slope toward Lake Superior.

=== Climate ===
Climate data for Superior, Wisconsin (1991–2020 normals, extremes 1909–present)
Month	Jan	Feb	Mar	Apr	May	Jun	Jul	Aug	Sep	Oct	Nov	Dec	Year
Record high °F (°C)	55 (13)	60 (16)	80 (27)	92 (33)	96 (36)	98 (37)	105 (41)	99 (37)	97 (36)	89 (32)	79 (26)	60 (16)	105 (41)
Mean daily maximum °F (°C)	22.5 (−5.3)	26.9 (−2.8)	36.1 (2.3)	46.0 (7.8)	57.4 (14.1)	67.0 (19.4)	76.1 (24.5)	74.8 (23.8)	66.6 (19.2)	53.0 (11.7)	39.1 (3.9)	27.3 (−2.6)	49.4 (9.7)
Daily mean °F (°C)	14.1 (−9.9)	18.0 (−7.8)	28.5 (−1.9)	38.9 (3.8)	49.1 (9.5)	58.2 (14.6)	67.1 (19.5)	66.4 (19.1)	58.4 (14.7)	45.8 (7.7)	32.4 (0.2)	20.2 (−6.6)	41.4 (5.2)
Mean daily minimum °F (°C)	5.8 (−14.6)	9.1 (−12.7)	21.0 (−6.1)	31.8 (−0.1)	40.9 (4.9)	49.5 (9.7)	58.0 (14.4)	58.0 (14.4)	50.1 (10.1)	38.6 (3.7)	25.6 (−3.6)	13.1 (−10.5)	33.5 (0.8)
Record low °F (°C)	−37 (−38)	−38 (−39)	−38 (−39)	−2 (−19)	11 (−12)	25 (−4)	34 (1)	31 (−1)	19 (−7)	9 (−13)	−19 (−28)	−32 (−36)	−38 (−39)
Average precipitation inches (mm)	0.81 (21)	0.89 (23)	1.41 (36)	2.64 (67)	3.37 (86)	4.56 (116)	3.88 (99)	3.92 (100)	3.39 (86)	3.17 (81)	2.12 (54)	1.29 (33)	31.45 (799)
Average snowfall inches (cm)	14.5 (37)	12.4 (31)	9.1 (23)	1.7 (4.3)	0.0 (0.0)	0.0 (0.0)	0.0 (0.0)	0.0 (0.0)	0.0 (0.0)	0.2 (0.51)	5.8 (15)	12.3 (31)	56.0 (142)
Average precipitation days (≥ 0.01 in)	7.1	5.6	7.1	8.8	11.6	11.5	10.4	9.6	9.9	9.7	8.1	7.0	106.4
Average snowy days (≥ 0.1 in)	6.8	5.2	3.7	1.6	0.0	0.0	0.0	0.0	0.0	0.1	3.1	5.7	26.2
Source: NOAA

== Demographics ==
Historical population
Census	Pop.	Note	%±
1890	11,983		—
1900	31,091		159.5%
1910	40,384		29.9%
1920	39,671		−1.8%
1930	36,133		−8.9%
1940	35,136		−2.8%
1950	35,325		0.5%
1960	33,563		−5.0%
1970	32,237		−4.0%
1980	29,571		−8.3%
1990	27,134		−8.2%
2000	27,368		0.9%
2010	27,244		−0.5%
2020	26,751		−1.8%
U.S. Decennial Census; 2020 census

=== 2020 census ===
As of the 2020 census, Superior had a population of 26,751. The median age was 38.0 years. 19.5% of residents were under the age of 18 and 17.5% of residents were 65 years of age or older. For every 100 females there were 97.4 males, and for every 100 females age 18 and over there were 95.6 males age 18 and over. The population density was 730.5/sq mi (282.0/km^{2}).

97.7% of residents lived in urban areas, while 2.3% lived in rural areas.

There were 11,821 households in Superior, of which 23.9% had children under the age of 18 living in them. Of all households, 33.5% were married-couple households, 24.6% were households with a male householder and no spouse or partner present, and 30.9% were households with a female householder and no spouse or partner present. About 37.7% of all households were made up of individuals and 14.1% had someone living alone who was 65 years of age or older. There were 12,593 housing units at an average density of 343.9/sq mi (132.8/km^{2}), of which 6.1% were vacant. The homeowner vacancy rate was 1.0% and the rental vacancy rate was 4.6%.

Racial composition as of the 2020 census
Race	Number	Percent
White	23,450	87.7%
Black or African American	491	1.8%
American Indian and Alaska Native	575	2.1%
Asian	250	0.9%
Native Hawaiian and Other Pacific Islander	16	0.1%
Some other race	169	0.6%
Two or more races	1,800	6.7%
Hispanic or Latino (of any race)	573	2.1%

=== 2010 census ===
As of the census of 2010, there were 27,244 people, 11,670 households, and 6,548 families residing in the city. The population density was 737.1/sq mi (284.6/km^{2}). There were 12,328 housing units at an average density of 333.5/sq mi (128.8/km^{2}). The racial makeup of the city was 91.5% White, 1.4% African American, 2.6% Native American, 1.2% Asian, 0.2% from other races, and 3.1% from two or more races. Hispanic or Latino people of any race were 1.4% of the population.

There were 11,670 households, of which 28.3% had children under the age of 18 living with them, 37.2% were married couples living together, 13.5% had a female householder with no husband present, 5.4% had a male householder with no wife present, and 43.9% were non-families. 34.6% of all households were made up of individuals, and 12% had someone living alone who was 65 years of age or older. The average household size was 2.23 and the average family size was 2.84.

The median age in the city was 35.4 years. 21.3% of residents were under the age of 18; 13.4% were between the ages of 18 and 24; 26% were from 25 to 44; 25.9% were from 45 to 64; and 13.5% were 65 years of age or older. The gender makeup of the city was 49.0% male and 51.0% female.

=== 2000 census ===
As of the 2000 census, there were 27,368 people, 11,609 households, and 6,698 families residing in the city. The population density was 740.9 people per square mile (286.1/km^{2}). There were 12,196 housing units at an average density of 330.2 per square mile (127.5/km^{2}). The racial makeup of the city was 94.26% White, 0.68% Black or African American, 2.23% Native American, 0.84% Asian, 0.04% Pacific Islander, 0.26% from other races, and 1.69% from two or more races. 0.83% of the population were Hispanic or Latino of any race. 15.8% were of German, 13.6% Norwegian, 10.9% Swedish, 9.3% Irish, 7.2% Polish, 6.9% Finnish and 5.3% American ancestry.

There were 11,609 households, out of which 27.9% had children under the age of 18 living with them, 41.3% were married couples living together, 12.3% had a female householder with no husband present, and 42.3% were non-families. 34.2% of all households were made up of individuals, and 13.9% had someone living alone who was 65 years of age or older. The average household size was 2.26 and the average family size was 2.91.

The city's median household income was $31,921, and the median family income was $41,093. Males had a median income of $33,712 versus $22,073 for females. The per capita income for the city was $17,253. 13.4% of the population and 9.6% of families were below the poverty line. 16.0% of those under the age of 18 and 7.8% of those 65 and older were living below the poverty line. In the city, the population was spread out, with 22.7% under the age of 18, 12.9% from 18 to 24, 27.9% from 25 to 44, 21.6% from 45 to 64, and 15.0% who were 65 years of age or older. The median age was 36 years. For every 100 females, there were 92.4 males. For every 100 females age 18 and over, there were 88.8 males.

== Economy ==
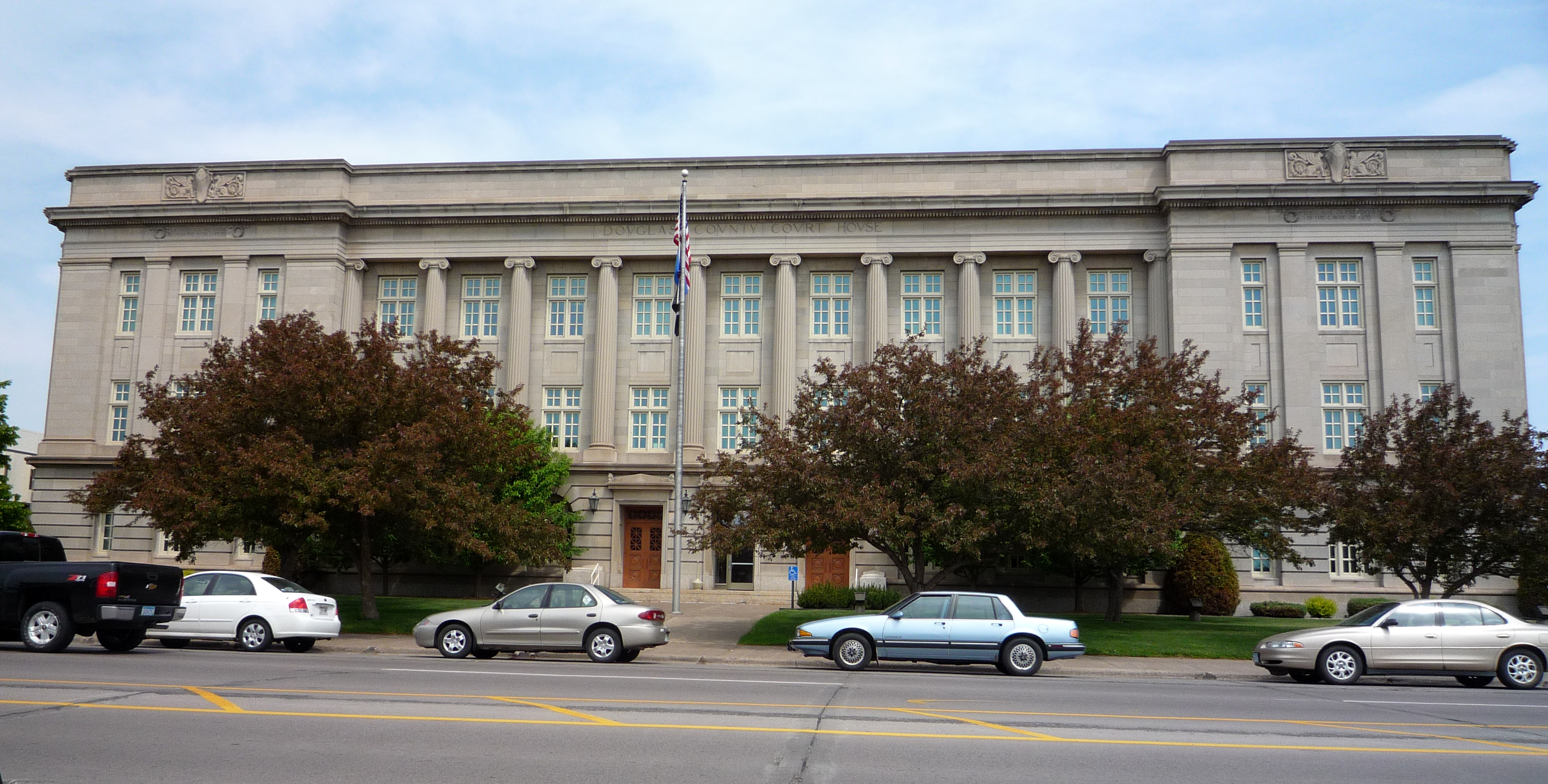
Douglas County Courthouse

The transportation industry accounts for more than 1,000 jobs. The Twin Ports of Duluth–Superior, the largest in the Great Lakes, welcomes both domestic and foreign vessels. Bulk solids (such as grain) make up much of the tonnage handled by the port, and the silos of such port facilities are visible on the Superior waterfront. In 2004, the port's busiest year since 1979, more than 41.4 million metric tons were shipped out of the port. BNSF Railway has an operations hub in Superior.

Cenovus Energy operates a refinery in Superior. The refinery is located along a pipeline connecting western Canada and the Midwest. On April 26, 2018, there was an explosion at the refinery. Douglas County issued a state of emergency due to heavy smoke, and then an evacuation order for local residents and workers. There were 20 injuries, and five were taken to hospital in Duluth. No fatalities were reported.

Growing area manufacturers include FenTech, Inc., which manufactures vinyl doors and windows; Charter NEX Films, a producer of plastic films; Genesis Attachments, manufacturer of shears and grapples; Amsoil, a producer of synthetic motor oil and lubricants; and Crane Song Ltd. a manufacturer of discrete Class A electronics for recording studios. Fraser Shipyards also provides many jobs to local residents. They repower and repair commercial vessels.

== Arts and culture ==
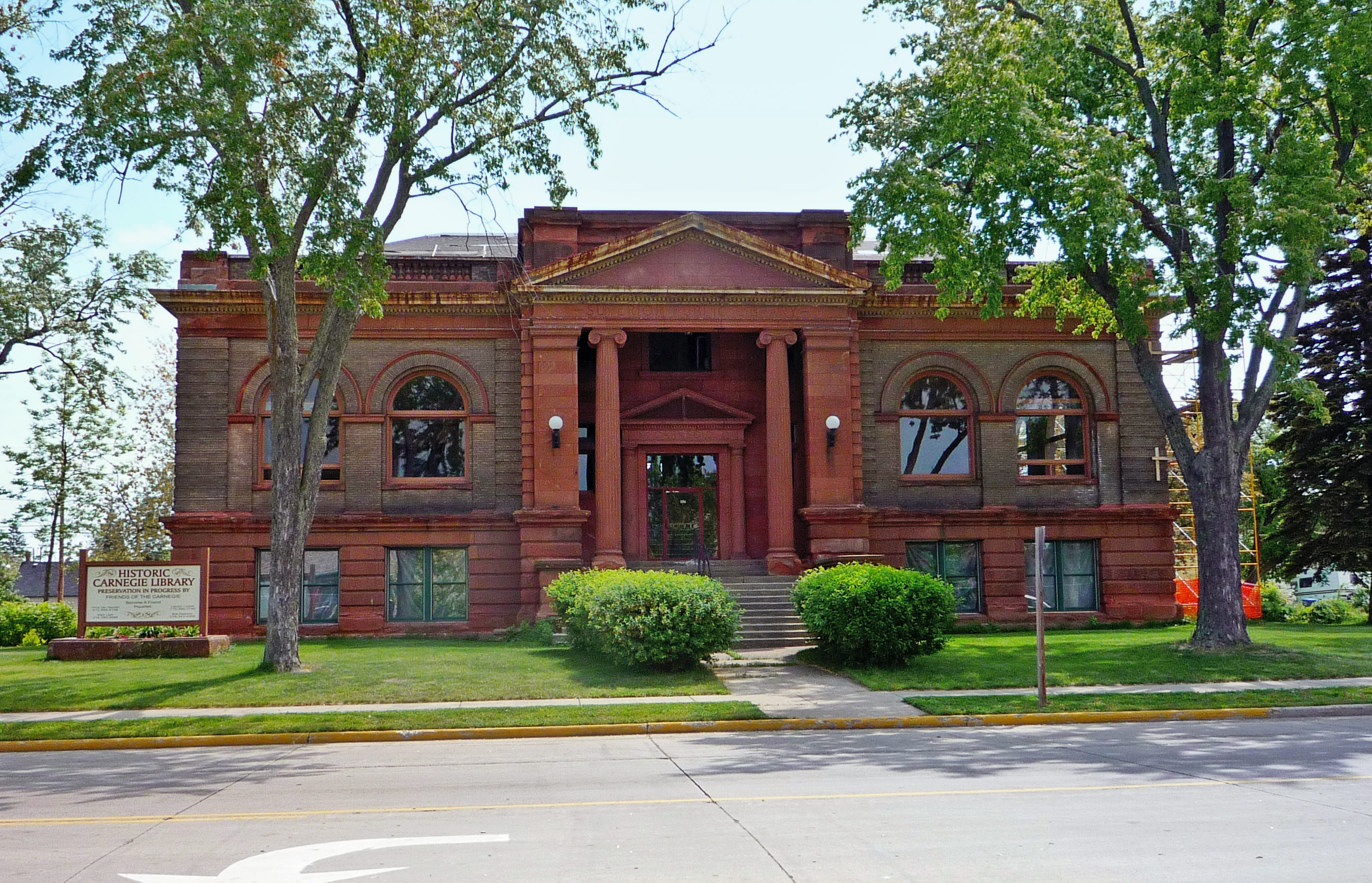
Superior has both the first and last Carnegie libraries built in Wisconsin. The first, pictured, was built in 1901 and served as the main library until 1991.

Superior Public Library is located in downtown Superior.

Superior City FC, a semi-professional soccer club, compete in the United Premier Soccer League (UPSL). Founded in 2023, the club supports a Men's UPSL Premier team, a Women's UPSL Premier team, and multiple amateur adult teams. The club plays their home games at the NBC Spartan Sports Complex, located at Superior Senior High School.

Every summer, Superior Porchfest takes place, occurring every two weeks on Thursdays between June and September. This community event features musical performances on the porches of homeowners in various neighborhoods, transforming these spaces into makeshift stages. The lineup typically includes at least three musical acts, with the potential for up to six. Superior Porchfest is organized by the 501(c)(3) nonprofit organization Siggy's Musical Garden.

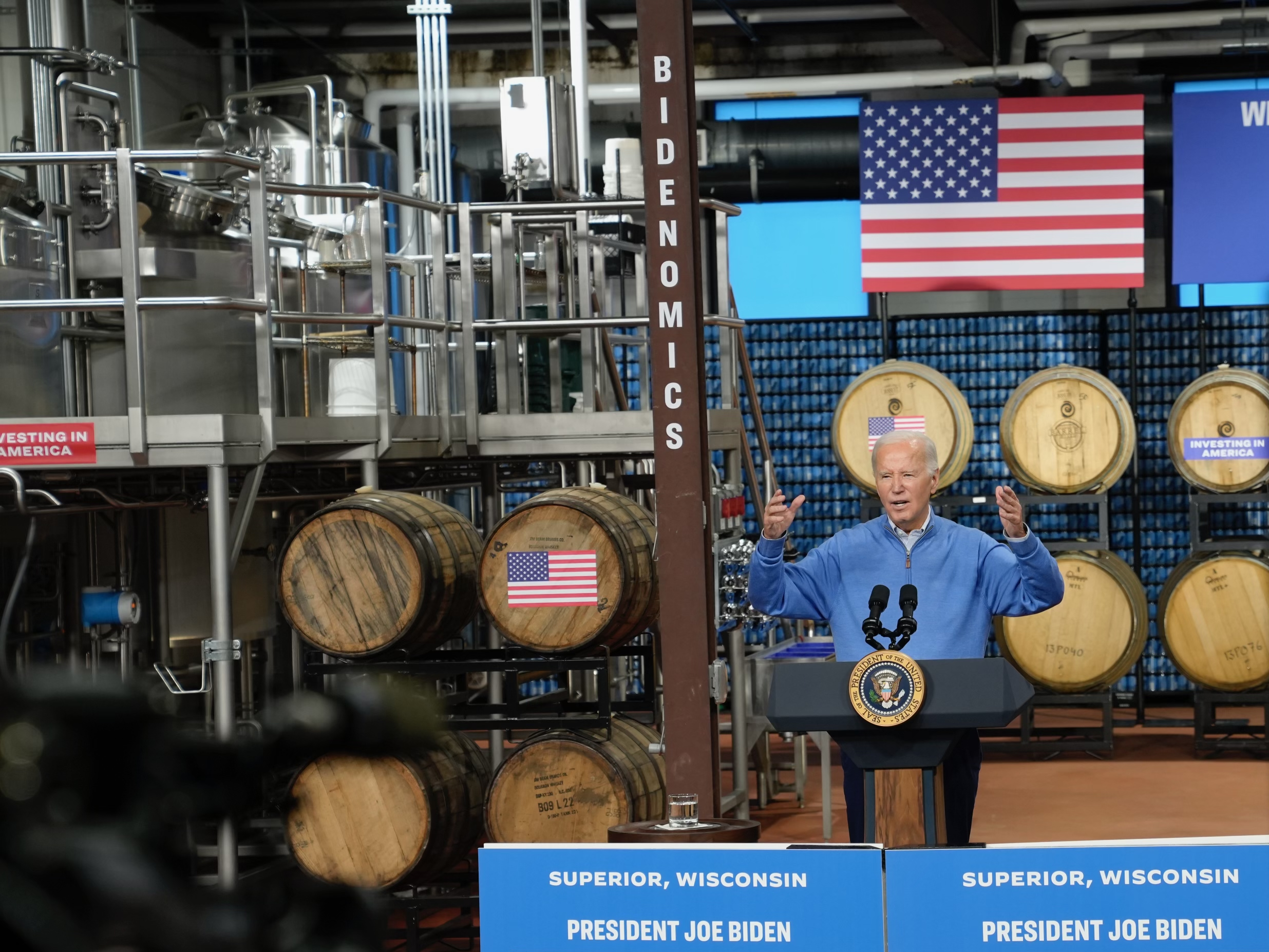
President Joe Biden announces funding for a new bridge at Earth Rider Brewery in Superior, Wisconsin

Old taverns, dive bars, and breweries are a prominent part of the social infrastructure of Superior, Wisconsin. In the age on industrialization and the peak of the usage of the towns ports, many immigrants from various background came to the city looking for work and the bars began to open rapidly, centered around Tower Avenue, which is near the largest grain port in the city. Today, the city of Superior and the Superior Public Arts Commission recognize the importance of these old dive bars as community hubs and support them through grants. The Anchor Bar and Grill, which has won numerous regional and national honors for its burgers and fries, is located in Superior on Tower Avenue..

== Parks and recreation ==
There are several parks in the city, including the third largest municipal forest in the United States, located in the city's Billings Park neighborhood. The city has a Parks, Recreation & Forestry Department which maintians city parks, dogs parks, ballfields, playgrounds, boat launches, trails, urban trees, recreational areas and outdoor ice rinks.

Nemadji Golf Course is a 36-hole public golf facility located in the city and host competitive golf and cross country running tournaments at the NCAA Division III level.

== Government ==
The current mayor of Superior is Jim Paine, who was first elected in 2017. Superior is also governed by a Common Council. The Common Council serves as the legislative branch of the City government, enacting ordinances, resolutions, approving the budget, setting policies and taking other actions as necessary to guide the operations of City government. Nonpartisan elections are held in April of each year, If more than two candidates vie for the same office, a primary will be held the preceding February. A re-organizational meeting is held the third Tuesday in April where the Council President and vice-president are selected.

The Common Council is supported by several committees. Committee meetings are open to the public and subject to the open meeting rules. The Committee of the Whole is made up of ten councilors and meets immediately after the 2nd monthly Regular Council Meeting, except in April, when the Council organizes and elects their president and Vice President. There are six standing committees: Committee of the Whole, Finance, Human Resources, License and Fees, Public Safety, and Public Works. Special committees may be established by three-fourths vote of the council. The city has more than 40 Committees and Commissions which are made up of City of Superior residents, elected officials and/or City Staff.

Presidential election results

Presidential election results
Year	Republican	Democratic	Third parties
2024	39.4% 5,329	58.7% 7,943	1.9% 328
2020	37.9% 5,083	59.6% 7,999	2.5% 328
2016	37.4% 4,642	54.9% 6,828	7.7% 956
2012	29.6% 3,783	69.0% 8,816	1.4% 178
2008	29.5% 4,154	68.9% 9,711	1.6% 229
2004	30.6% 4,566	68.5% 10,217	0.8% 125
2000	28.2% 3,687	66.1% 8,647	5.6% 738

== Education ==
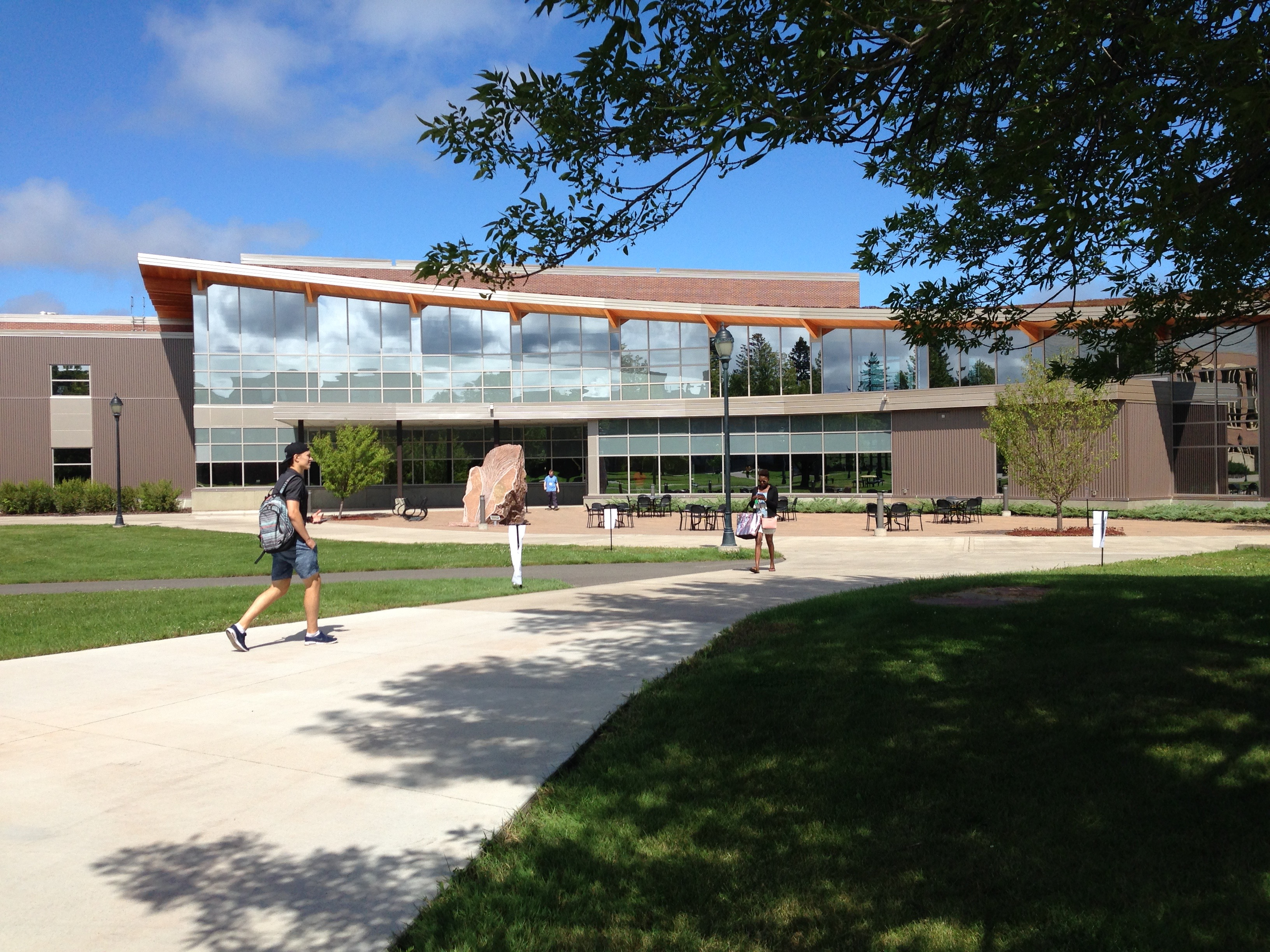
Yellowjacket Union at the University of Wisconsin–Superior

Superior is served by the Superior School District, which has one high school, one middle school, and five elementary schools, with a total enrollment of over 4,000 students. Superior High School enrolls more than 1,500 students. Its mascot is Sparty the Spartan. Parochial schools include the Catholic Cathedral School, the Protestant-based Maranatha Academy and Twin Ports Baptist School.

The University of Wisconsin–Superior (UWS) is a public liberal arts college. Originally opened as a state Normal School (teacher's college), UWS became part of the University of Wisconsin System in 1971.

Northwood Technical College (formerly WITC) offers skill development and technical education, with an enrollment of over 2,200.

== Media ==
=== Print media ===
- The Superior Telegram, local weekly print newspaper
- The Superior Catholic Herald, published by the Roman Catholic Diocese of Superior
- Positively Superior a bi-monthly business-to-business magazine that focuses exclusively on Superior and Douglas County

=== Radio ===
Superior is part of the Duluth radio and television market.

- KDKE 102.5 FM – classic Country
- KUWS 91.3 FM – Music network of Wisconsin Public Radio, UW-Superior sports and local music
- WDSM 710 AM – News Talk Information
- WDUL 970 AM – Sports
- WGHF-LP 93.7 FM – Superior Seventh-Day Adventist Church
- WSSU (FM) 88.5 FM – WPR News

=== Television ===
- 6 KBJR-TV (NBC/CBS) – Superior
- 3 KDLH (The CW) – Duluth
- 8 WDSE (PBS) – Duluth
- 10 WDIO-DT (ABC) – Duluth
- 21 KQDS (Fox) – Duluth
- 27 KCWV (Family Chanel) – Duluth

== Transportation ==
=== Highways ===
The following routes are located within the city of Superior.

- Interstate 535 – John Blatnik Bridge
- U.S. Highway 2 – Belknap Street(western portion) E. 2nd Street/US Highway 53 (eastern portion)
- U.S. Highway 53
- Wisconsin Highway 35 – Tower Avenue
- Wisconsin Highway 105 – Central Avenue
- Minnesota State Highway 39 runs from its intersection with State Highway 23 (Commonwealth Avenue) in Duluth and continues east to its eastern terminus at the Wisconsin state line (at the Oliver Bridge), where it becomes Wisconsin Highway 105 upon entering the village of Oliver, Wisconsin.

=== Airport ===
Richard I. Bong Airport (KSUW) serves the city and surrounding communities. Duluth International Airport in Duluth is the nearest commercial airport, with service on three commercial and two cargo airlines, as of December 2018.

=== Bus ===
The Duluth Transit Authority provides Superior and nearby Duluth with fixed-route and dial-a-ride public bus service. Intercity bus service to the city is provided by Indian Trails.

=== Rail ===
A proposed Amtrak route running between Duluth and the Twin Cities had a planned stop in Superior. In 2025, a significant portion of the funding was reallocated for the proposed rail line, with lawmakers implying the project will no longer go forward.

== Religion ==
Superior is the episcopal see of the Roman Catholic Diocese of Superior, and the Cathedral of Christ the King in Superior is the mother church of the diocese. Saint Francis Xavier Catholic Church, located in the East End of Superior, has been noted for its architecture. Christ Evangelical Lutheran Church is the only congregation of the Lutheran Church Missouri Synod located in Superior. It recently moved from its original location on Belknap Street to a new campus on North 28th Street. Pilgrim Lutheran Church is located along Belknap Street near the University of Wisconsin–Superior. United Presbyterian Church represents the Presbyterian Church U.S.A. as a merger of three churches in a new church building. Faith United Methodist Church is the result of a merger of the city's original three Methodist Churches: First, Central and Trinity. Many small churches dot the city's neighborhoods, representing most major denominations.

== Notable people ==
- James H. Agen, Wisconsin state representative
- Wallace W. Andrew, Wisconsin state representative
- Morrie Arnovich, MLB All-Star outfielder
- Dave Bancroft, MLB player and manager, member of the National Baseball Hall of Fame
- David Francis Barry, photographer of the American West
- David L. Bazelon, judge of the U.S. Court of Appeals
- Kris Benson, Major League Baseball player
- Niko Bogojevic, professional wrestler for WWE
- Richard Bong, Medal of Honor recipient and top flying ace of the U.S. in World War II
- C.A. Bottolfsen, 17th and 19th governor of Idaho
- Charles J. Bouchard, Wisconsin state representative
- Dave Bronson, mayor of Anchorage, Alaska
- Esther Bubley, photographer
- Anthony Bukoski, short story writer
- Solanus Casey, priest and a "blessed" of the Catholic Church
- Carl Cashion, MLB player
- Agnes Charbonneau, Wisconsin state representative
- Frank Christopherson Jr., Wisconsin state representative
- Paul Clemens, U.S. Army general
- Charles H. Crownhart, justice of the Wisconsin Supreme Court
- Albert W. Durley, Wisconsin state representative and lawyer
- Russ Ennis, MLB player
- Ernest R. Feidler, U.S. Coast Guard Rear Admiral and Judge Advocate General, Secretary of the National Gallery of Art
- Daniel R. Fitzpatrick, editorial cartoonist
- William R. Foley, Wisconsin state representative
- James B. French, Wisconsin state representative
- Philip Gannon, Wisconsin state representative
- Bud Grant, head coach of the Minnesota Vikings from 1967 to 1983; 1985, member of the Canadian Football Hall of Fame and Pro Football Hall of Fame
- Lawrence M. Hagen, Wisconsin state representative
- John Henry Hammond (1833–1890), Civil War veteran and land developer in West Superior
- Ogden H. Hammond, diplomat and New Jersey politician
- Christine Hoberg, singer-songwriter and music producer
- William E. Hoehle, Wisconsin state representative
- George Hudnall, Wisconsin state senator
- Eastman Johnson, artist, co-founder of the Metropolitan Museum of Art
- Doc Kelley, NFL player
- Bill LaBounty, songwriter and musician
- Tuffy Leemans, NFL player, member of the Pro Football Hall of Fame
- Irvine L. Lenroot, U.S. representative, U.S. senator, and judge of the U.S. Court of Customs and Patents Appeals
- Victor Linley, Wisconsin state senator
- Robert J. MacDonald, Michigan state senator
- James S. Mace, Wisconsin state representative
- Gordon MacQuarrie, journalist and outdoors writer
- Bruce Mathison, NFL player
- Edgar G. Mills, Wisconsin state representative and senator
- Thomas Brooks Mills, Wisconsin politician
- Thomas B. Murray, Wisconsin state representative
- Ernie Nevers, member of both College and Pro Football Halls of Fame
- Marian Nixon, actress
- Ray J. Nye, Wisconsin state senator
- Scott O'Brien, special teams coordinator of the New England Patriots
- Bob Olson, football player
- Byron C. Ostby, Wisconsin state representative
- Dave Peterson, coach of the United States men's national ice hockey team
- Angus B. Rothwell, Superintendent of Public Instruction of Wisconsin
- Augustine Francis Schinner, bishop of the Roman Catholic Diocese of Superior and Roman Catholic Diocese of Spokane
- Lewis B. Schwellenbach, U.S. Secretary of Labor
- Frank D. Sheahan, Wisconsin state representative
- Mike Sislo, NHL player
- Henry Clay Sloan, Wisconsin state representative
- Edward Stack, Wisconsin state representative
- James S. Stack, Wisconsin state representative
- Don Stivers, artist
- Doug Sutherland, NFL player
- Tarzan Taylor, NFL player
- David Tipton, NFL player
- Leonard Patrick Walsh, United States District Court judge in Washington, D.C.
- Albert D. Whealdon, Wisconsin state representative
- Jarvis White, Wisconsin state representative
- Jeffrey Williams, NASA astronaut
- Oliver E. Williamson, winner of the 2009 Nobel Prize in economics
- F. A. Woodward, Superior mayor, Arizona state senator

== See also ==
- Richard I. Bong Memorial Bridge
- John A. Blatnik Bridge
- Lakehead Pipeline
