= Ernest Staples Osgood =

American historian

Ernest Staples Osgood (October 29, 1888 – June 22, 1983) was an American historian of the American West and Guggenheim Fellow best known for his book The Day of the Cattleman and for his work on the field notes of Captain William Clark.

== Early life ==
Osgood was born in Lynn, Massachusetts, on October 29, 1888, the son of John C. and Eveline H. Osgood and the nephew of prominent colonial American historian Herbert Levi Osgood. There, he attended Lynn Classical High School. He went on to attend Dartmouth College, graduating with his A.B. in 1912. After brief, unsuccessful stints in Ohio and Chicago, Osgood moved to Montana. From 1914 to 1924, he taught history at Helena High School in Helena, Montana, where his interest in and love of the American West and particularly Montana was stoked.

== Professional career ==
In 1924, he moved to Madison, Wisconsin to pursue a PhD in history at the University of Wisconsin, which he was awarded in 1927. After teaching at the University of Wisconsin from 1927 to 1929, he moved westward to the other side of the St. Croix River (Wisconsin-Minnesota) to a professorship at the University of Minnesota.

His scholarly work focused largely on issues relating to the American West. His book The Day of the Cattleman, a regional study of cattlemen in Montana and Wyoming in the mid-nineteenth century, was his most critically acclaimed work. It focuses on the cattlemen's utilization of the semi-arid Great Plains region as well as their roles in railroad building and building an economic foundation for the American West. His work on The Day of the Cattleman along with a number of subsequent articles in the journals Minnesota History and Agricultural History were enough to earn him a Guggenheim Fellowship in 1936. This fellowship was to support a book on Montana history which never materialized. Along with his own scholarship, Dr. Osgood was an active participant in the historical conversation by writing numerous book reviews of works on the American West well into his retirement in the 1960s, most notably reviewing Walter Prescott Webb's seminal work The Great Plains in 1932.

Dr. Osgood's second book happened almost by accident. In 1953, a former student of his, Lucile M. Kane, who had gone on to work at the Minnesota Historical Society called him up. She had just left the St. Paul, Minnesota home of the granddaughter of John Henry Hammond, a general during the Civil War on the staff of William Tecumseh Sherman and, later, an inspector for the Bureau of Indian Affairs. Kane told Dr. Osgood that in the papers of General Hammond, she had found a bundle wrapped in an 1805 copy of the Washington, D.C. National Intelligencer. Within that bundle were the unmistakable field notes of Captain William Clark, from the famous Lewis and Clark Expedition. After a prolonged federal legal battle over ownership of the papers involving Hammond's descendants, the Minnesota Historical Society, Yale University, and the National Archives and Records Administration, the papers ended up in the Western Americana Collection at Yale University's Beinecke Rare Book & Manuscript Library where Osgood was able to finish editing the collection. It was published as The Field Notes of Captain William Clark, 1803–1805 by Yale University Press in 1964.

== Retirement and death ==
After 30 years at the University of Minnesota, Dr. Osgood retired to Wooster, Ohio where he occasionally lectured at the College of Wooster, continued to write, and was an Independent Study Advisor to scores of students, including Pulitzer Prize winner Susan Q. Stranahan. He spent his summers in Montana with his wife on Alice Creek in the western part of that state, near Lewis and Clark Pass (Montana), until his death in 1983. His love of the West never abated; in an article published near the end of his life in the Western Historical Quarterly of the Western History Association entitled "I Discover Western History", Osgood wrote "As I drive westward, the words of the prophet Isaiah come to me, 'For ye shall go out with joy, and be led forth with peace; the mountains and the hills shall break forth before you into singing and all the trees of the field shall clap their hands'."
