= Anthony Bukoski =

Polish-American author of short stories

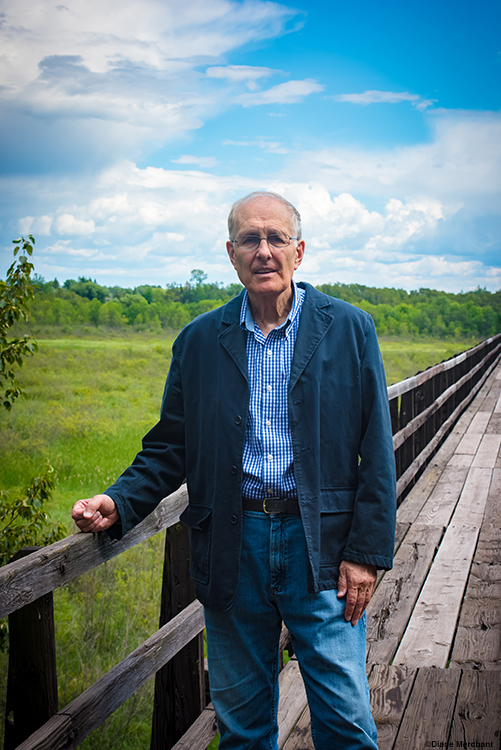
- Bukoski in 2022
- Born: Anthony Vincent Bukoski; October 18, 1945 (age 81); Superior, Wisconsin, U.S.
- Known for: Short stories
- Awards: Anne Powers Book Length Fiction Award (now the Edna Ferber Fiction Book Award) four times from the Council for Wisconsin Writers; The Polish American Historical Association Creative Arts Award as well as its Oskar Halecki Prize; The Christopher Isherwood Foundation R. V. Cassill Fellow in Fiction

Anthony Bukoski (born October 18, 1945) is a Polish-American writer living in Superior, Wisconsin. He has published several collections of short stories and won various awards. His story "Time Between Trains" was read in live performance by Liev Schreiber at New York's Symphony Space as part of the Selected Shorts program. He is a professor emeritus at the University of Wisconsin-Superior.

== Biography ==
Bukoski was born at St. Francis Hospital in Superior's East End neighborhood. His mother, the former Genevieve Barbara Fronckiewicz, was a homemaker. Bukoski has said that his father, Joseph Anthony Bukoski, sailed on the Great Lakes, at first working belowdecks as a coal passer shoveling coal into boilers on "Black Gangs." During World War II, he served as a first assistant engineer on merchant marine ships in the Atlantic, the Mediterranean, and the Persian Gulf. Later, Bukoski's father worked in the King Midas flour mill in Superior. The mill plays a role in several of Bukoski's stories.

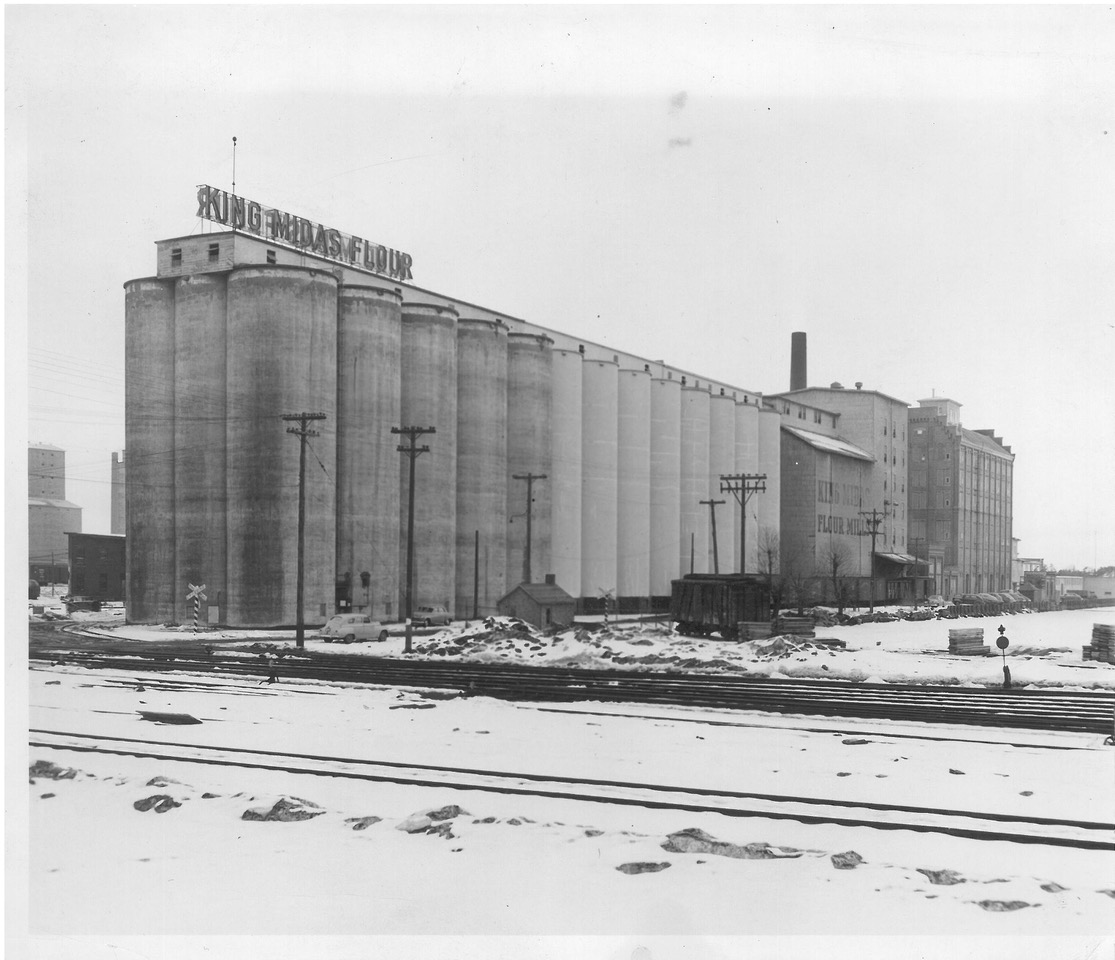
King Midas Flour Mill, Superior, Wisconsin

Bukoski attended St. Adalbert's grade school and church, where he was an altar boy. In 1963 he graduated from Superior Cathedral High School. A year later, he joined the Marines. He served a tour in Da Nang, South Vietnam. At the time of his discharge in 1967, he had achieved the rank of corporal. Bukoski then returned to Superior and enrolled at Wisconsin State University-Superior, now University of Wisconsin-Superior, graduating in 1970. Bukoski earned an A.M. degree at Brown University. He attended the University of Iowa, earning an M.F.A. at the Iowa Writers' Workshop, where he studied with John Irving, and a Ph.D. in literature in 1984. After teaching at Northwestern State University in Natchitoches, Louisiana, Bukoski returned to his hometown to take a position at the University of Wisconsin-Superior. For most of his life, Bukoski has lived in Superior. He says that the city and its working-class Polish-American community with its deep ties to the Catholic Church are the subjects of many of his short stories.

In 2018, Bukoski was named a Fellow of the Wisconsin Academy of Sciences, Arts, and Letters.

== Critical reception ==
A New York Times review called Bukoski, "a sure-handed, lyrical writer with ... a powerful empathy for the earnest, hopeful, hapless and dispirited people of a heretofore mostly silent culture." On the other hand, a Publishers Weekly reviewer felt that many stories collected in North of the Port, "...never quite gel and seem to be more about style and craft than about memorable characters or situations." The reviewer did call a few of the stories "moving." Flannery O’Connor, Elizabeth Strout, Eudora Welty, and Sherwood Anderson are among the regional writers Bukoski has been compared to. Bukoski has won the Anne Powers Book Length Fiction Award (now the Edna Ferber Fiction Book Award) four times from the Council for Wisconsin Writers. The Polish American Historical Association has twice presented Bukoski its Creative Arts Award and once its Oskar Halecki Prize. In 2002 he was named the R. V. Cassill Fellow in Fiction by the Christopher Isherwood Foundation, and he was awarded the first Literary Prize given by Polish Institute of Houston, "For Excellence in presenting the life of American Polish communities in the Midwest."

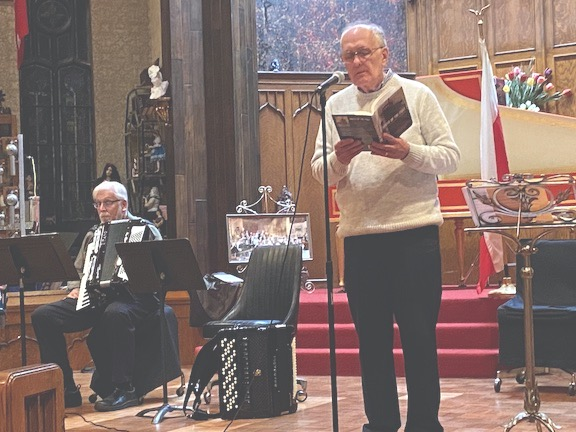
Anthony Bukoski reading from North of the Port at A World of Accordions Museum, Superior, WI

== Work ==
Bukoski's stories have been gathered in eight collections. He has published numerous stories in a variety of journals and magazines.

Among these journals are The Cimarron Review, Image, Quarterly West, The Literary Review, Ascent, New Letters, New Orleans Review, Alaska Quarterly Review Tikkun Magazine, Arcana (Krakow, Poland), and Akcent (Lublin, Poland).

Bukoski is a member of the National Book Critics Circle. He has reviewed a number of books for the Minneapolis Star Tribune. He has written reviews for Books in Canada, Studies in the Novel, Canadian Literature, and other publications.

== Story collections ==
- Twelve Below Zero – New Rivers Press, 1986
- Children of Strangers: Stories – Southern Methodist University Press, 1993
- Polonaise: Stories – Southern Methodist University Press, 1999
- Time Between Trains: Stories – Southern Methodist University Press, 2003; reprinted by Holy Cow! Press, 2011
- North of the Port: Stories – Southern Methodist University Press, 2008
- Twelve Below Zero: New and Expanded Edition – Holy Cow! Press, 2008
- Head of the Lakes: Selected Short Stories – Nodin Press, 2018.
- The Blondes of Wisconsin – University of Wisconsin Press, 2021
- The Thief of Words – University of Wisconsin Press, 2025
