= List of presidents of Union College =

== Presidents ==
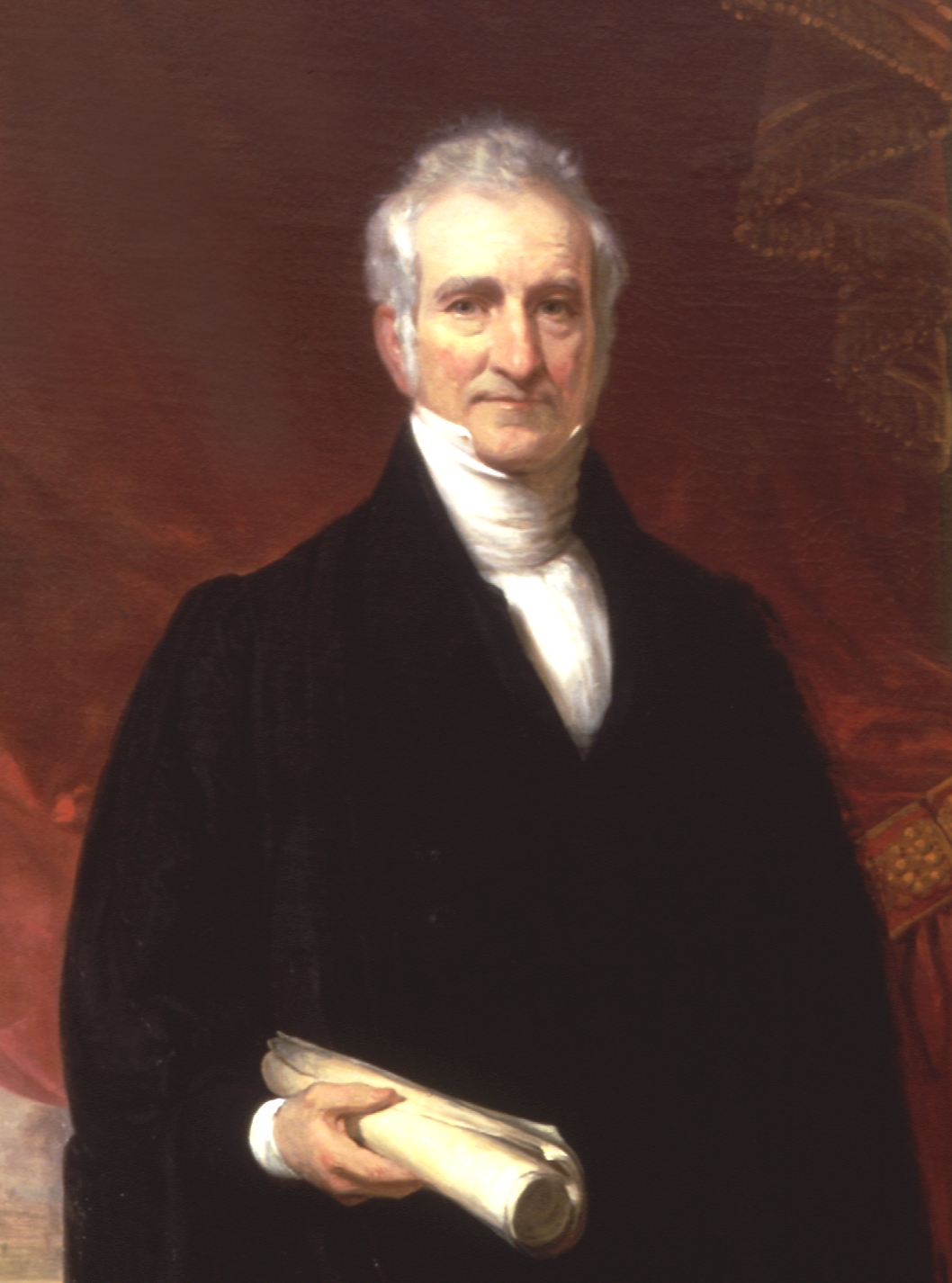
Eliphalet Nott

Union College has had twenty presidents since its founding in 1795.

1. John Blair Smith (1795–1799)
2. Jonathan Edwards, Jr. (1799–1801)
3. Jonathan Maxcy (1802–1804)
4. Eliphalet Nott (1804–1866)
5. Laurens Perseus Hickok (1866–1868)
6. Charles Augustus Aiken (1869–1871)
7. Eliphalet Nott Potter (1871–1884) President ad interim: Judson S. Landon (judge and trustee) (1884-1888)]
8. Harrison Edwin Webster (1888–1894)
9. Andrew Van Vranken Raymond (1894–1907)
10. Charles Alexander Richmond (1909–1928)
11. Frank Parker Day (1929–1933)
12. Dixon Ryan Fox (1934–1945)
13. Carter Davidson (1946–1965)
14. Harold Clark Martin (1965–1974)
15. Thomas Neville Bonner (1974–1978)
16. John Selwyn Morris (1979–1990)
17. Roger Harold Hull (1990–2005) [Interim: James Underwood (2005–2006)]
18. Stephen Ainlay (2006–2018) [Acting President: Therese A. McCarty (July–December 2013)]
19. David R. Harris (2018–2025)
20. Elizabeth Kiss (2025–present)
