= Paul Clemens (United States Army officer) =

United States Army general

Paul Clemens was a general officer in the United States Army. He was born in Superior, Wisconsin. During World War I he served as Chief of Staff of the 32nd Infantry Division. Later he was given command of the 64th Infantry Brigade of the 32nd Infantry Division.

== Career ==
While serving in World War I he was awarded the Army Distinguished Service Medal.

His award citation reads:

The President of the United States of America, authorized by Act of Congress, July 9, 1918, takes pleasure in presenting the Army Distinguished Service Medal to Lieutenant Colonel (Infantry) Paul B. Clemens, United States Army, for exceptionally meritorious and distinguished services to the Government of the United States, in a duty of great responsibility during World War I. As Assistant Chief of Staff, G-2, 32d Division, during its operations in France, Lieutenant Colonel Clemens displayed unusual and masterful grasp of his duties, executive ability of high order, and intense zeal and devotion to duty. His initiative, foresight, and good judgment were important factors in the successes of his division and made his services of inestimable value to the Government in a position of great responsibility.

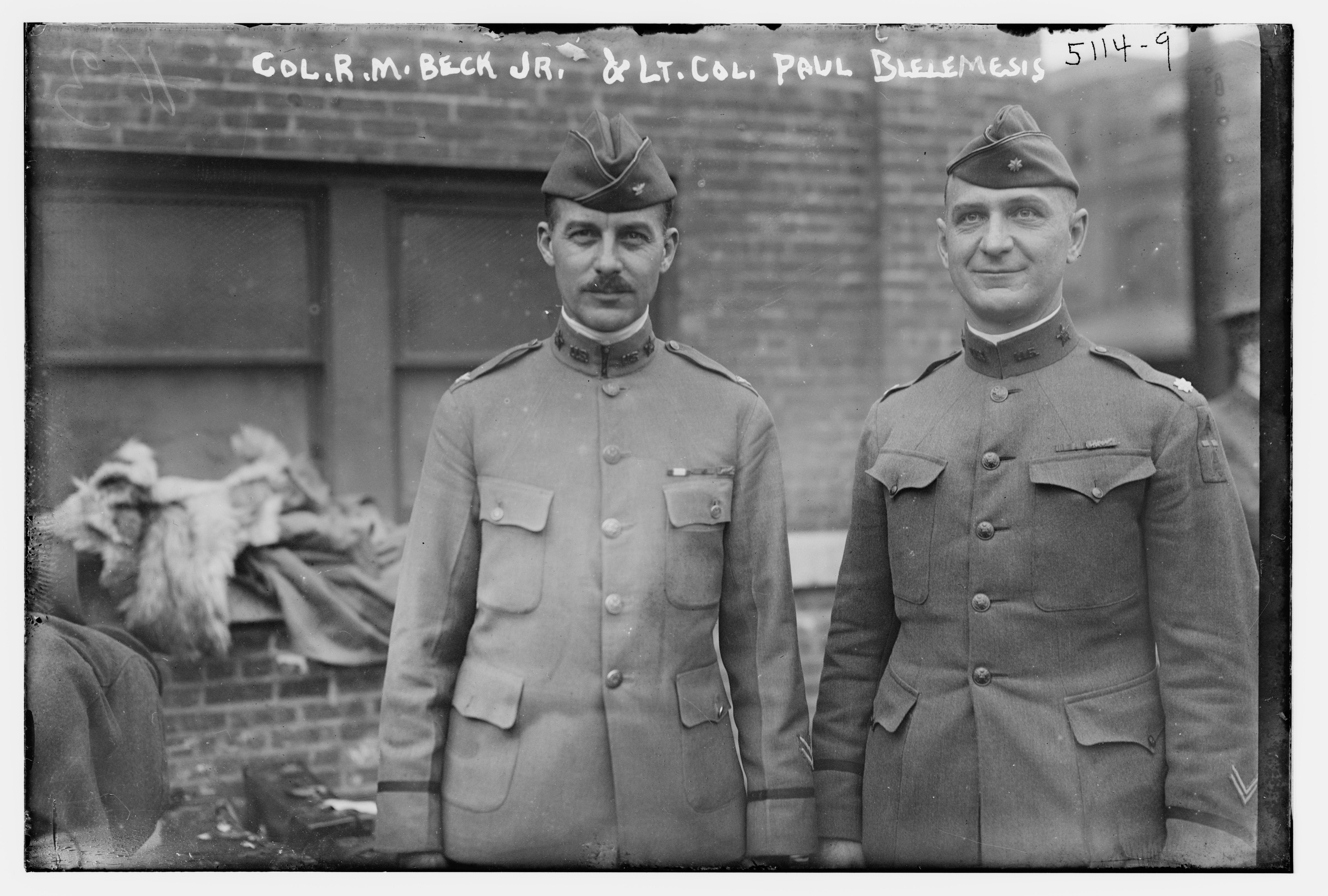
Clemens (right)
