= Virginia station (Minnesota) =

- Duluth, Winnipeg, and Pacific Depot
- U.S. National Register of Historic Places
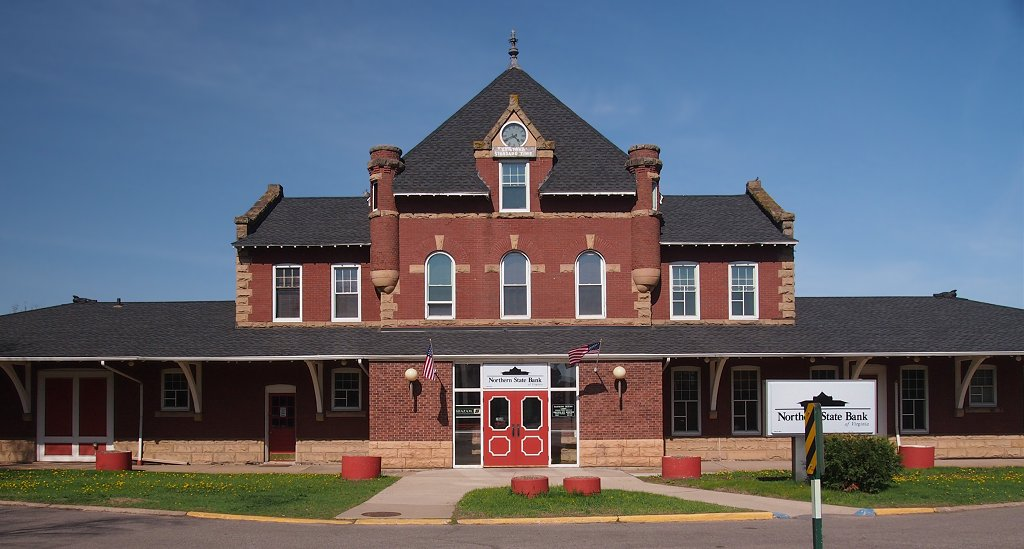
- The Virginia Depot viewed from the east

- Location within Minnesota Location within the United States
- Location: 600 Chestnut Street, Virginia, Minnesota
- Coordinates: 47°31′23″N 92°32′28″W
- Area: Less than one acre
- Built: 1913
- NRHP reference No.: 80004364
- Added to NRHP: August 18, 1980

The Virginia Depot is a former train station in Virginia, Minnesota, United States. It was built in 1913 by the Duluth, Winnipeg and Pacific Railway. The station was listed on the National Register of Historic Places as the Duluth, Winnipeg, and Pacific Depot in 1980 for its local significance in the themes of architecture, commerce, and transportation. It was nominated as a distinctive symbol of Virginia's importance as a major entry point to the Mesabi Range, and of the region's dependence on rail transport to deliver goods and workers and ship out ore.

The Virginia Depot occupies a prominent site at the west end of Chestnut Street, the artery running through Virginia's historic downtown. Immediately behind the depot is Silver Lake. Trains originally approached the station on a wooden trestle over the water, reflecting the pressure to maximize use of surface space in a city tightly hemmed by mining operations.

The Virginia Depot's final passenger train departed on July 1, 1961. Five years later the building was purchased for adaptive reuse as a bank.

== See also ==
- National Register of Historic Places listings in St. Louis County, Minnesota

== Gallery ==
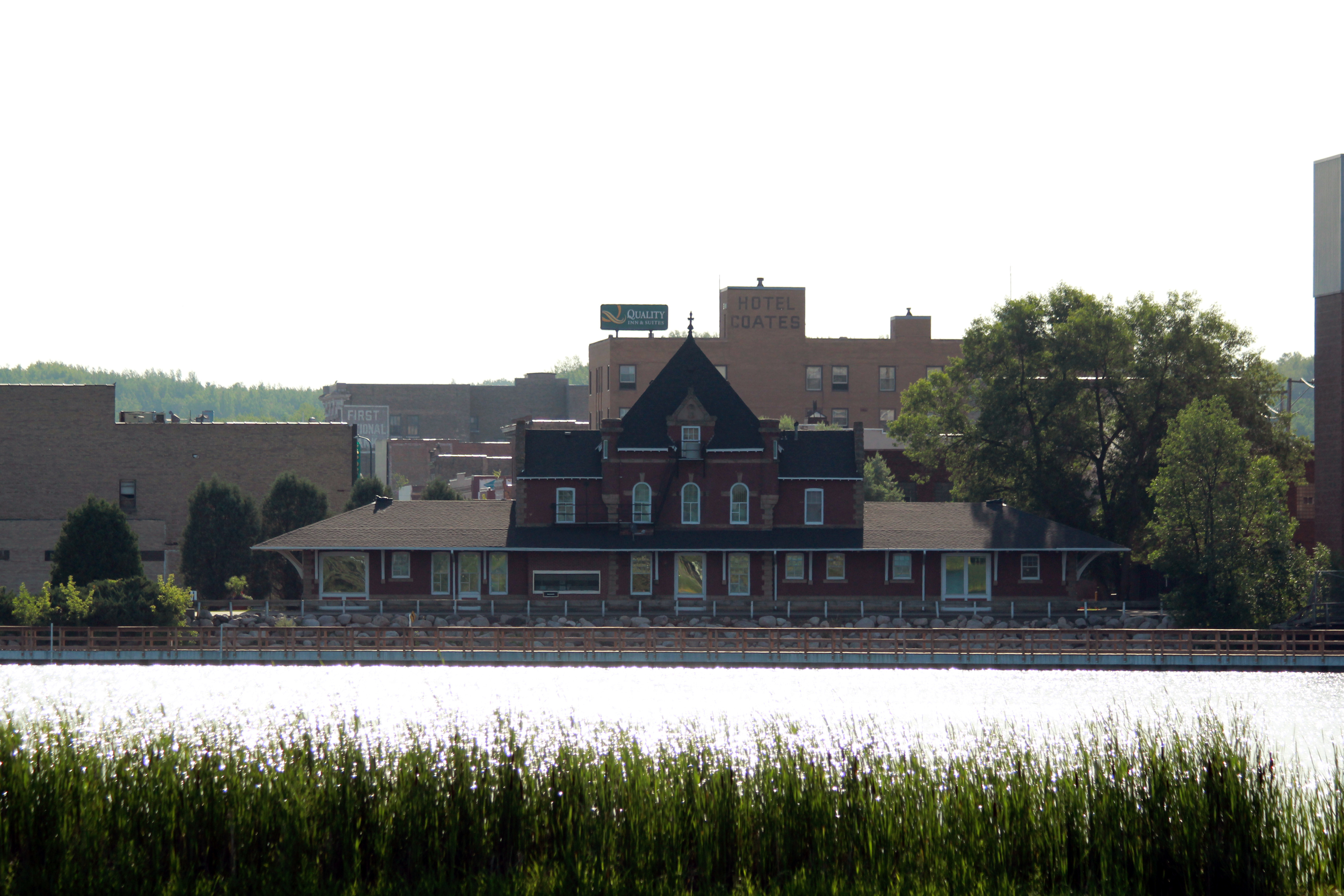
Silver Lake

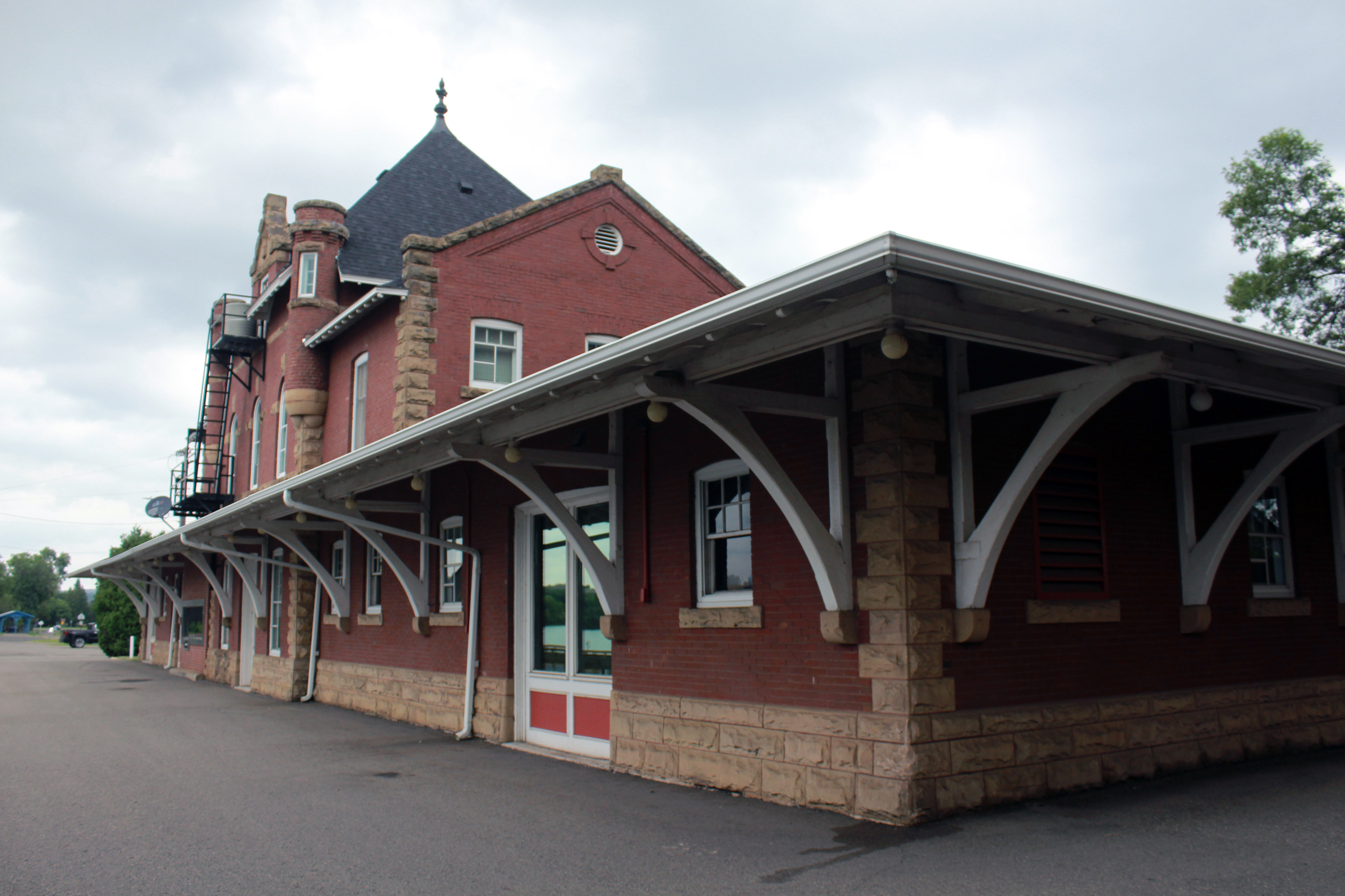
Detail of clock tower

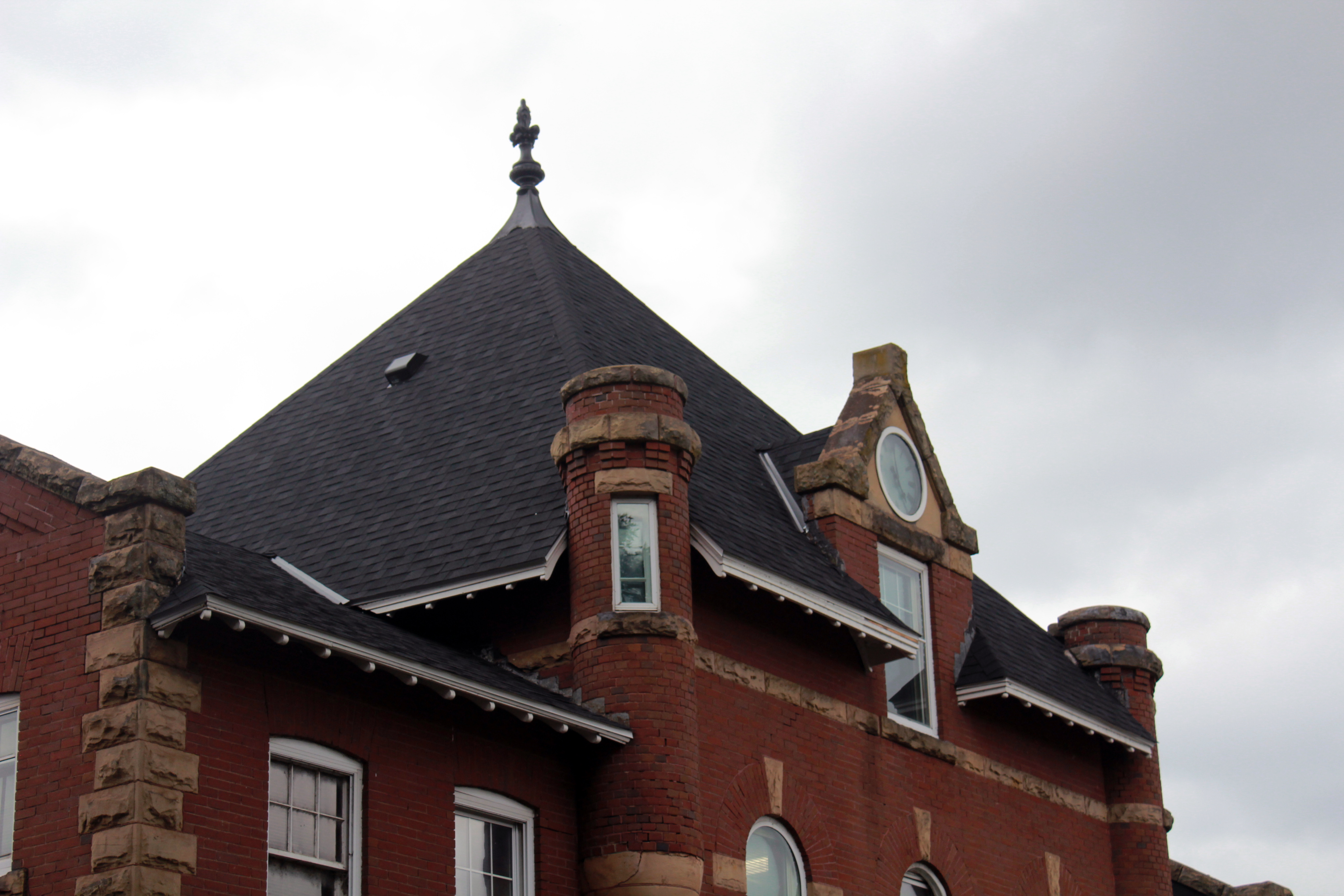
Back of Depot
