= Land of the Loon =

Land of the Loon is an annual event each summer hosted by the city of Virginia, Minnesota for its residents and surrounding communities. Each year it starts off with a parade, then Olcott Park hosts dozens of merchants to sell their fine goods of arts, crafts, foods, clothing, jewelry, etc.

Land of the Loon has also been used to host All Class Reunions for the Virginia High School (which hosted its first All Class Reunion in 2008). During these events, Virginia, Minnesota sees its highest peak of tourism.

Land of the Loon is one of many summer time celebrations celebrated in the area collectively known as the Mesabi Iron Range. Others include Mines and Pines in Hibbing, Minnesota, Eveleth, Minnesota 3 July, Gilbert, Minnesota 4 July, Hoyt Lakes, Minnesota Water Carnival, Merritt Days in Mt. Iron, Minnesota, and several others.

Officials scrapped the event in 2020 citing COVID-19 pandemic concerns.
