= Mesabi Trail =

Bike trail in Minnesota

Coordinates: 47°29′44″N 92°41′30″W

- Mesabi trailhead at the Itasca County Fairgrounds in Grand Rapids, Minnesota.
- Length: 165 miles (265.5 km)
- Location: Grand Rapids, Minnesota, United States
- Use: Cycling, pedestrians
- Surface: Asphalt, small gravel portions
- Maintained by: Saint Louis County, Itasca County
- Website: https://mesabitrail.com/

The Mesabi Trail is a 165 mile paved bicycle trail running from Grand Rapids, Minnesota to Ely, Minnesota. Until August 2026, the Mesabi Trail was not fully contiguous. The completion of the final section of trail between Embarrass and Tower made the trail the longest paved trail in Minnesota. The trail goes through the many small towns along it, such as Marble, Keewatin, Hibbing, Mountain Iron, Virginia, and Gilbert. Much of the trail runs along abandoned railroad grade.

== The Great River Mesabi Trail Ride ==
Since 2005, the Mesabi Trail has hosted a long bike ride every year in mid-August. Each stop (usually at a town or at intervals between towns) has fruit, water, granola, and other snacks. In Buhl, there is ice cream. The refreshments are free, as is the food at the ending destination, but there is a fee to ride in this event. To accommodate riders of different abilities, the ride includes multiple official starting points; while the full route may be 50 to 70 miles, intermediate starting places along the route may be as close as 8 or 10 miles from the end.

Year	Start	End	Max Length
2005	Biwabik (Giant's Ridge Ski Resort)	Chisholm (Ironworld Discovery Center)	50 miles
2006	Biwabik (Giant's Ridge Ski Resort)	Hibbing (Bennet Park)	57 miles
2007	Marble	Virginia (Olcott Park)	51 miles
2008	Marble	Virginia (Olcott Park)	51 miles
2009	Grand Rapids (Itasca County Fairgrounds)	Chisholm (Museum of Mining)	50 miles
2010	Biwabik (Giant's Ridge Ski Resort)	Hibbing (Bennet Park)	50 miles
2011	Chisholm (Minnesota Discover Center)	Grand Rapids (Itasca County Fairgrounds)	48 miles
2012	Grand Rapids (Itasca County Fairgrounds)	Virginia (Olcott Park)	64 miles
2013	?	?	?
2014	Fayal Township (Township Hall)	Coleraine (Longyear Park)	69 miles

== Historical signs ==
Along the Mesabi Trail there are signs that establish the history along it. Most of the signs notice certain areas as important to the Mesabi Range's early mining economy.
