= Thomas Rukavina Memorial Bridge =

Highway bridge in Minnesota, U.S.

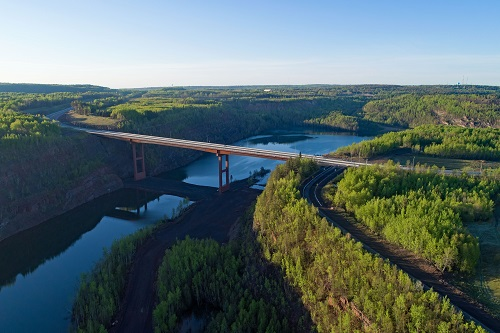
- Coordinates: 47°30′47″N 92°31′21″W
- Carries: Four lanes of US 53
- Crosses: Rouchleau Mine Pit
- Locale: Virginia, Minnesota
- Official name: Thomas Rukavina Memorial Bridge
- Other name: U.S. Route 53 Bridge
- Maintained by: Minnesota Department of Transportation
- ID number: 69129

Characteristics
- Total length: 1,125 ft (343 m)
- Height: 204 ft (62 m)

History
- Opened: September 4, 2017; 8 years ago

Location
- Interactive map of Thomas Rukavina Memorial Bridge

The Thomas Rukavina Memorial Bridge carries U.S. 53 over the Rouchleau Mine pit connecting Virginia, Minnesota with other cities to the south. U.S. 53 continues through Virginia to International Falls and Canada; International Falls is about 100 miles (160 km) north of Virginia. The bridge, opened in 2017, was named after Tom Rukavina in 2021 following his death in 2019. Rukavina was a state legislator from the Iron Range. At 204 feet (62 m) tall, it is the tallest bridge in Minnesota. This bridge carries a traffic volume of about 22,200 cars per day, making it one of the most-traveled highway segments on the Iron Range. The bridge also features a bike lane and pedestrian walkway that leads to trails connecting Gilbert and Virginia. The Mesabi Trail crosses the bridge.

In 1960, the state of Minnesota and the mining companies in the area came to an agreement that allowed the construction of U.S. 53 across lands held by the mining company without the state paying anything for the land. The agreement stipulated that after 1987, the state would be responsible for the costs involved with moving the roadway to allow for mining after given advance notice by the mining companies. The two owners of the land notified MnDOT of their intent to mine the site in 2010 which gave the state until 2017 to move the roadway. Cliffs Natural Resources which had a nearby active mine, hope to begin mining the site by 2017. After evaluating several more expensive options that involved longer bridges or routing US 53 across an active mine pit, an alignment was selected that resulted in the highest bridge in Minnesota. A route on level ground away from the mining formation was identified as too disruptive to development patterns in the area. The entire project estimated to cost $220 million with $159 million for construction of the bridge and diverted roadway. The bridge crosses the Rouchleau Mine pit. The water filled pit also serves as Virginia's water supply. The final cost was $230 million with $30 million coming from the federal government and the remaining from the state. To prevent the need to move the bridge in the future, the state purchased the mineral rights for the land beneath the roadway for $15 million.

== Major intersections nearby ==
Main intersections in a five miles (8.0 km) radius of the bridge.

- Minnesota State Highway 135 - To Gilbert
- Minnesota State Highway 37 - To Gilbert
- U.S. Highway 169 - To Hibbing

== Gallery ==
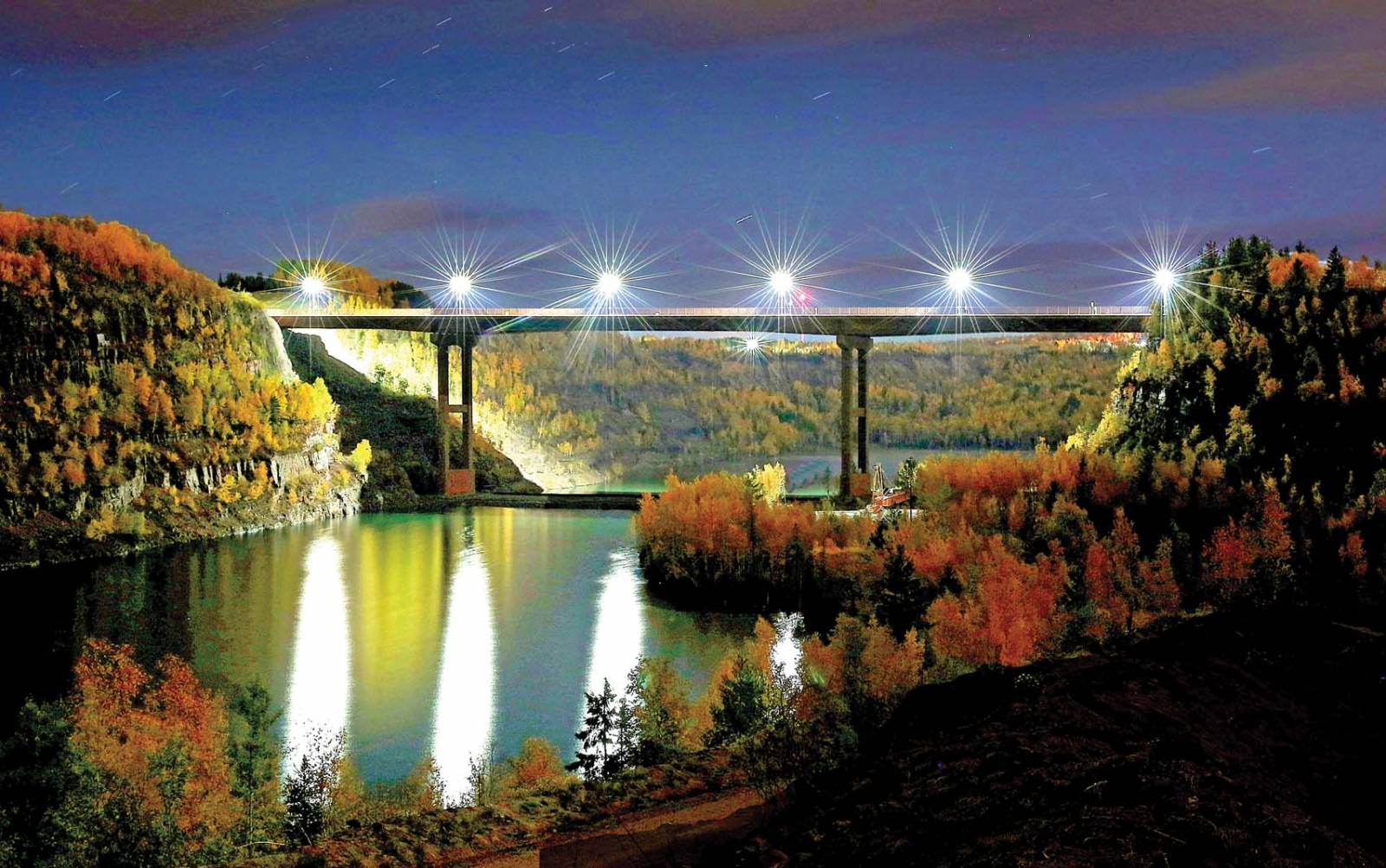
Night Time Image of Thomas Rukavina Memorial Bridge

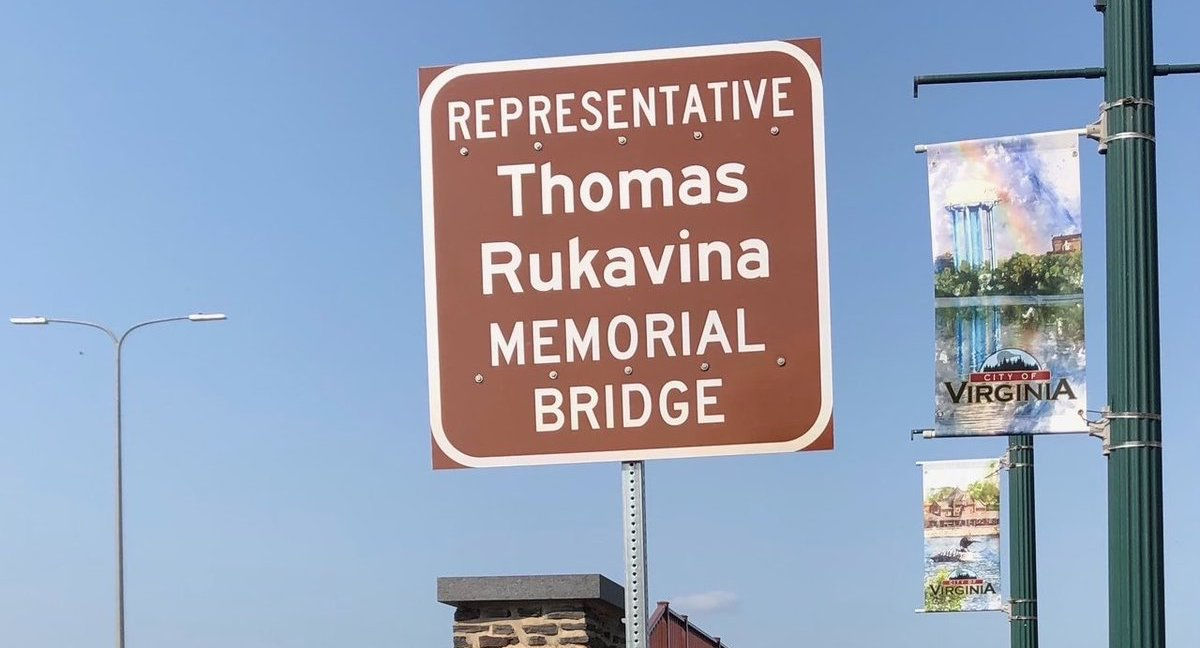
Thomas Rukavina Memorial Bridge Sign
