= Sherman Walt =

Sherman Abbot Walt (August 22, 1923 – October 26, 1989) was one of the foremost American bassoonists of the 20th century. Born in Virginia, Minnesota, he served in the U.S. Army in World War II, winning a Bronze Star; after his discharge from the service he joined the Chicago Symphony Orchestra as principal bassoonist. He studied at the University of Minnesota and the Curtis Institute of Music. In 1951 he moved to the Boston Symphony Orchestra and served in a similar position there for the remainder of his career. He is featured on numerous recordings as an ensemble player and soloist.

He was hit by an automobile while helping his wife cross the road in 1989 just a few months after his retirement. He was eulogized in print by Seiji Ozawa "From the beginning, Sherman made me feel tremendous joy and pride to be the music director of the Boston Symphony Orchestra. His death is a great loss for all of us in the Boston Symphony family. Sherm was a magnificent musician, a wonderful human being and my dear friend. We are all shaken by this tragedy and will mourn this day forever."
