= Thomas D. Yukelich =

American politician (1909–1984)

Thomas D. Yukelich (July 9, 1909 – August 7, 1984) was an American politician.

Yukelich was born in Virginia, St. Louis County, Minnesota and graduated from Virginia High School. He went to Virginia Junior College and to Winona State University. Yukelich lived in Gilbert, Minnesota with his wife and family and served as the Gilbert City Assessor from 1933 to 1939. Yukevich served in the Minnesota House of Representatives from 1939 to 1946 and in the Minnesota Senate from 1947 to 1966. He was a Democrat. Yukelich died from lung cancer at the Virginia Regional Hospital in Virginia, Minnesota.
