= Tim Paulson =

California labor leader (born 1952)

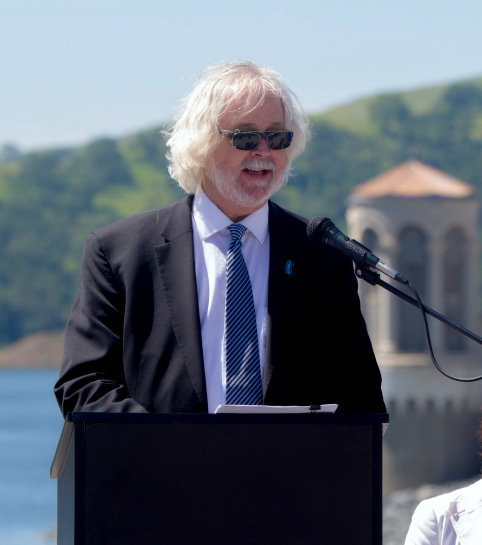
- Born: Timothy Dale Paulson; November 27, 1952 (age 73); Virginia, Minnesota, U.S.
- Education: Macalester College
- Occupations: Secretary-Treasurer of the San Francisco Building and Construction Trades Council

Timothy "Tim" Dale Paulson (born November 27, 1952) is a California labor leader, who last served as the Secretary-Treasurer of the San Francisco Building and Construction Trades Council from July 2018 to 2022.

== Early life and education ==
Paulson was born and raised in Virginia, Minnesota, a small mining town on northern Minnesota's Mesabi Iron Range and later moved to the Twin Cities where he earned his bachelor's degree in Economics and Political Science at Macalester College, a private liberal arts school in St. Paul.

Paulson later moved to San Francisco in the late 1970s, and currently lives in the Mission District.

== Career ==
Paulson began his career in 1981 as a tile-setter for the Bricklayers, Tilesetters and Allied Craftworkers Local 3 Union, going on to serve in a variety of capacities including: Journeyperson, Foreman, Principal Officer, Business Agent, and Apprenticeship Training Coordinator for the Northern California Tilelayers and Tile Finishers Joint Apprenticeship and Training Committee.

In the late 1990s he served as the Organizing and Political Director for SEIU's Justice for Janitors campaigns in San Francisco, generating significant union membership growth and helping to jumpstart SEIU's successful campaign to organize and improve the lives of security officers. In 1997 delegates to the San Francisco Building and Construction Trades Council elected Paulson as their vice president.

Paulson would then go on to work as the Political Director and Assistant Executive Officer of the San Mateo County Central Labor Council. At the San Mateo CLC, he directed all political activities of the council, and coordinated a wide range of Council activities, including the staffing of the council's Airport Labor Coalition, a monthly convening of labor unions which monitors, and coordinates labor activities at San Francisco's International Airport.

Thereafter, Paulson spent the previous 14 years as Executive Director of the San Francisco Labor Council, having been unanimously elected every 2 years. The San Francisco Labor Council is the center of labor activity in San Francisco and comprises 150 local unions, representing over 100,000 working men and women in San Francisco. The mission of the Labor Council is to promote social and economic justice for all working people. As Executive Director, Paulson led and coordinated labor's political activities, organized events, fundraisers and rallies, coordinated the council's legislative campaigns at the local, state and national levels, and supported affiliate unions in their bargaining and contract negotiations when necessary.

While at the Labor Council, Paulson oversaw the passage of the Health Care Security Ordinance which requires that employers make Health Care Expenditures (health insurance, City Option payments, etc.) on behalf of their workers. He was also instrumental in passing the $15 minimum wage increase for the City and County of San Francisco in 2014, and the Retail Employee Rights Ordinances, which regulates hours, retention, scheduling, and treatment of part-time employees at some Formula Retail Establishments. Additionally, Paulson established the community benefits agreement for the revitalization of San Francisco's Hunters Point Shipyard. The community benefits agreement included over 10,000 new homes, 35% designated workforce affordable, and development that requires living wage jobs. Paulson also secured a donation agreement on behalf of the developer of over $35 million to support the community during the build out for workforce development, education, and other needs.

Under his leadership at the San Francisco Labor Council, Paulson established the first union Immigrant Rights center in the nation, We Rise SF, a resource for documented, undocumented, and citizen workers in San Francisco and the surrounding Bay Area.

Paulson recently retired as the current Secretary-Treasurer of the San Francisco Building and Construction Trades Council where he negotiated many Project Labor Agreements for major San Francisco development projects that guaranteed prevailings wages, benefits and skilled apprenticeship training for all construction workers.

== Board and committees ==
Paulson has served various committees and boards, including AFL–CIO Presidents John Sweeney and Richard Trumka's National Advisory Committee on State Federations and Central Labor Councils, and the California Labor Federation's Strategic Advisory Committee, which is composed of representatives of the 15 largest international unions in California charged with coordinating and organizing political strategies.

Paulson has also been a trustee to various Taft–Hartley Health and Welfare and Pension trust funds, and in the early 1990s coordinated the Tile Layers' Local 19s Northern California Work Preservation organizing program which generated millions of dollars of employment during that recession.

Paulson was the Vice President of the statewide California Federation of Labor, AFL–CIO, which represents over 2,000 California unions. Additionally, while at the Labor Council, Paulson was a director of the United Way of the Bay Area, and was appointed by Janet Yellen to serve on the Community Advisory Board of the San Francisco branch of the Federal Reserve Bank.

Paulson is the chair of the San Francisco State University Labor Archives Board, and serves on both the San Francisco City College Labor Studies and the University of California Berkeley Institute for Labor Education and Research advisory boards.

For the last ten years he has also served on the Executive Board of the California Democratic Party as the elected Labor Chair, and since 2019 Paulson has served as Mayor London Breed's appointee to the San Francisco Public Utilities Commission.
