= Edwin H. Hoff =

American politician (1921–2007)

Member of the Minnesota House of Representatives from the 62 district
- In office January 7, 1969 – January 4, 1971

Personal details
- Born: February 5, 1921 Virginia, Minnesota, U.S.
- Died: August 9, 2007 (aged 86) Virginia, Minnesota, U.S.
- Party: Democratic–Farmer–Labor

Edwin H. Hoff (February 5, 1921 – August 9, 2007) was an American politician.

Hoff was born in Virginia, St. Louis County, Minnesota, and graduated from Virginia High School. He lived in Virginia, Minnesota with his wife and family and worked for the Oliver Mining Company as a mechanic. Hoff served on the Virginia City Council and on the St. Louis County Commission. Hoff served in the Minnesota House of Representatives in 1969 and 1970. Hoff died at the Virginia Convalescent Center in Virginia, Minnesota.
