= Luke F. Burns =

American politician (1881–1956)

Luke Francis Burns (May 16, 1881 – August 27, 1956) was an American lawyer and politician.

Burns was born in Osman, Manitowoc County, Wisconsin, and went to the Manitowoc, Wisconsin, schools. He went to University of Wisconsin–Oshkosh, Northwestern University Pritzker School of Law, and University of Wisconsin Law School. Burns practiced law in Virginia, St. Louis County, Minnesota and served as the Virginia City Attorney and the Kinney Village Attorney. He also served as the attorney for the Virginia Board of Education. Burns was also admitted to the Wisconsin bar. He served in the Minnesota House of Representatives in 1943 and 1944. Burns died in a hospital in Wausau, Wisconsin, and was buried in Wausau, Wisconsin.
