= William J. Olcott =

American college football player and mining and railroad executive

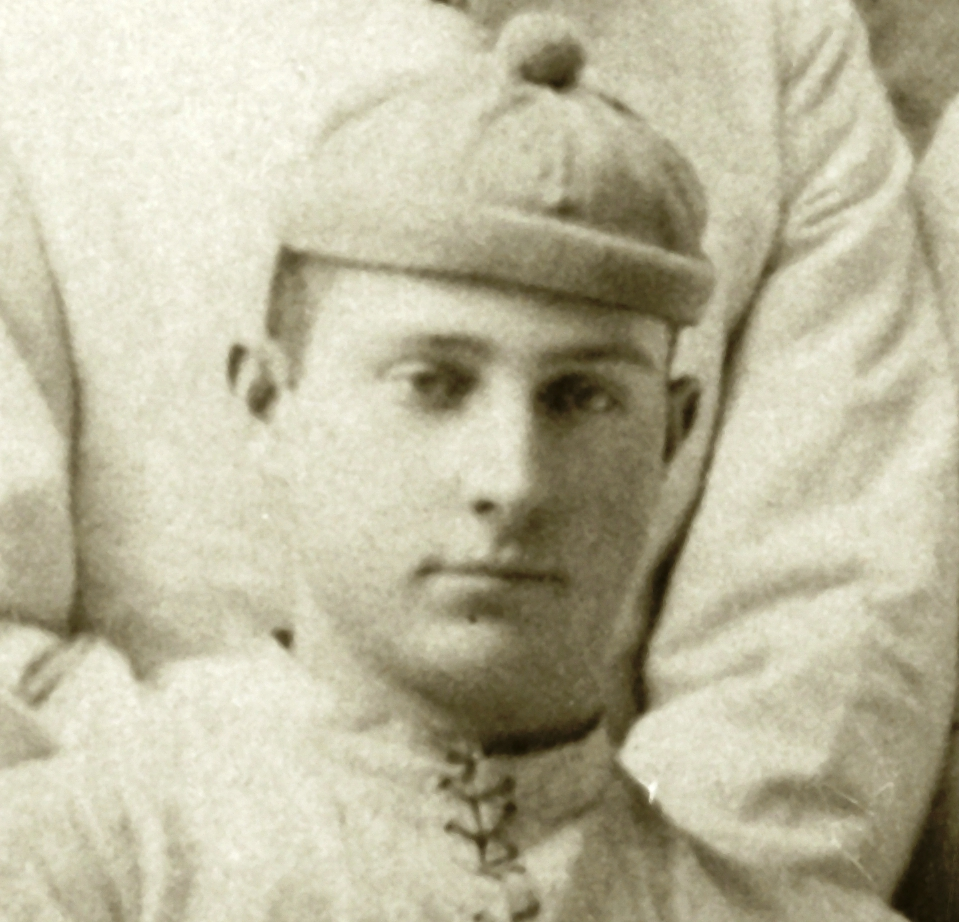
- Olcott cropped from 1883 University of Michigan team photograph
- Born: February 22, 1862; Detroit, Michigan, U.S.
- Died: April 29, 1935 (aged 73); Pasadena, California, U.S.
- Education: University of Michigan
- Known for: Football player/mining executive

William James Olcott (February 22, 1862 – April 29, 1935) was an American college football player and mining and railroad executive in the Mesabi Range. He played football for the University of Michigan from 1881 to 1883 and was captain of the 1882 and 1883 teams. After receiving his degree, he worked in the iron ore mining industry for more than 40 years. He was president of the Oliver Iron Mining Company from 1909 to 1928 and president of the Duluth, Missabe and Iron Range Railway from 1901 to 1909.

== Early years ==
Olcott was born in Detroit, Michigan, in 1862, the son of Harlow and Elizabeth Olcott. He moved with his family to Michigan's Upper Peninsula and attended school in Marquette, Michigan.

== University of Michigan ==
He subsequently attended the University of Michigan where he studied chemistry and mining. He played on the Michigan Wolverines football team, was the starting "three-quarter back" from 1881 to 1883 and served as captain of the 1882 and 1883 teams.

== Mining and railroad career ==
Olcott graduated from Michigan in 1884. After receiving his degree, Olcott returned to Michigan's Upper Peninsula, where he worked in the mining business. In 1885, he was employed as an assistant engineer to the Chapin Mine on the Menominee Range.

In 1890, he was reported to be living in Ironwood, Michigan, and working as an assistant superintendent of five mines at a salary of $3,600. Olcott later moved to Duluth, Minnesota, where he lived for three decades.

He became superintendent of the Lake Superior Consolidated Mines on the Mesabi Range. In 1897, he was appointed first vice president of the Duluth, Missabe and Iron Range Railway and in 1901 became the company's president. He served as the railroad's president from 1901 to 1909.

In 1905, Olcott was promoted to the position of vice president of the Oliver Iron Mining Company; he had previously been the general manager of the company. In 1909, he was appointed as the company's president. The Oliver Iron Mining Company was at the time the subsidiary of the United States Steel Corporation responsible for the company's iron ore mining operations. He testified in 1913 in a government suit seeking to break up the steel company. Olcott had 40,000 men working for him and reported directly to John D. Rockefeller. Rockefeller and his family stayed at the Olcott's home in 1928.

== Family and later years ==
On December 26, 1887, Olcott married Fannie Bailey of Ann Arbor, Michigan. In 1904, Olcott and his wife built a 10,000 square foot Georgian Colonial mansion for their family in Duluth. The house was built at a cost of $140,000 and had an estate covering five city lots surrounded by a brick and wrought iron wall. The Olcotts had two daughters who they raised in the house. The Olcott family donated the house to Duluth Teachers College in 1939, where it housed a music school.

In 1925, Olcott and his wife established the "Olcott Lodge", a rest lodge for wives of the Oliver Iron Mining Company at Half Moon Lake in the Mesabi Range. At the time, a newspaper account noted: "The lodge itself is a charming place, and the surroundings of lake and forest attractive and restful. The Olcotts not only have caused the beautiful lodge to be built and completely furnished and equipped, but they defray all costs of maintenance, with a competent and experienced woman in charge." In 1931, the camp was turned over to the Girl Scouts and has been operated since that time as the Fannie Bailey Olcott Girl Scout Camp.

Olcott retired as president of the Oliver Iron Mining Co. in 1928 and traveled extensively in the seven years following his retirement, including a year in Europe and trips to Florida and California.

In April 1935, Olcott died while visiting his daughter, Mrs. Torrey Ford, in Pasadena, California. He died from pneumonia following a stroke suffered several weeks earlier. He was 73 years old at the time of his death.

== Legacy and honors ==
- Olcott Park is a 40-acre (160,000 m2) piece of land in Virginia, Minnesota, reserved for the city's enjoyment. It has a fountain in the northern part built during the Great Depression. There is also a bandstand in the center, used mainly for city band performances. To the south, it borders Parkview Learning Center, to the east 9th Avenue West, to the north 9th Street North, and to the west Greenwood Cemetery. Olcott Park is also home to the Olcott Park Greenhouse. Williams Olcott's company, the Oliver Iron Mining Co., first leased the land to the city in 1905 for $1 per year if the city would pay taxes. In 1939 the city purchased the land for $9,015.
- Olcott Park Greenhouse is a ,500 square feet (420 m^{2}) city-operated greenhouse located in the 40-acre (162,000 m^{2}) Olcott Park at N 9th Avenue W and 7th Street N in Virginia, Minnesota. It is open to the public year-round without charge. This three-room greenhouse dates from the 1930s. Its central room contains a good collection of exotic plants, ranging in size from small specimens to mature Ponderosa lemon trees bearing fruit, with cacti and succulents, large agave, palm, and ficus specimens. Historically, it was the site for huge begonia shows which attracted thousands of visitors. The north and south greenhouses were used to raise bedding plants for flower beds throughout the city.
- Due to Olcott's standing in the mining and railroad industry, a steamboat was named for him and launched on July 9, 1910, in Ecorse, Michigan.
