= Kaleva Hall =

- Valon Tuote Raittiusseura
- U.S. National Register of Historic Places
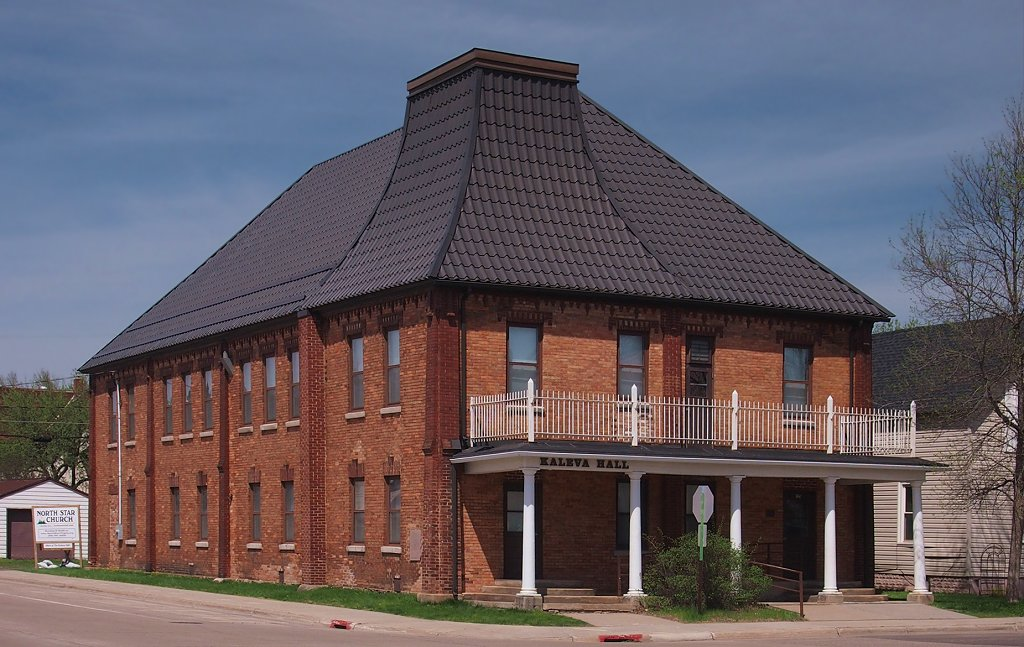
- Kaleva Hall viewed from the southwest

- Location within Minnesota Location within the United States
- Location: 125 3rd Street N., Virginia, Minnesota
- Coordinates: 47°31′34″N 92°31′58″W
- Area: Less than one acre
- Built: c. 1906
- NRHP reference No.: 79003199
- Added to NRHP: August 24, 1979

Kaleva Hall is a historic Finnish-American clubhouse in Virginia, Minnesota, United States. It was operated by the Valon Tuote temperance society from its construction around 1906 until the late 1960s, after which it was acquired by the Knights and Ladies of Kaleva. The building was listed on the National Register of Historic Places in 1980 under its Finnish name Valon Tuote Raittiusseura for its local significance in the themes of education, entertainment/recreation, and social history. It was nominated for continuously serving as the headquarters of one of the city's major ethnic groups throughout the 20th century.

== Description ==
Kaleva Hall is a rectangular, two-story building constructed of brick. Columnar brick buttresses divide the front façade into two bays and the side elevations into four bays. The building has a steeply pitched hip roof with an additional roof feature over the main entrance in the form of a squared-off bell. Some decorative brickwork creates a frieze just below the eaves.

== See also ==
- National Register of Historic Places listings in St. Louis County, Minnesota
