= Virginia Commercial Historic District =

Historic district in Minnesota, United States

- U.S. National Register of Historic Places
- U.S. Historic district
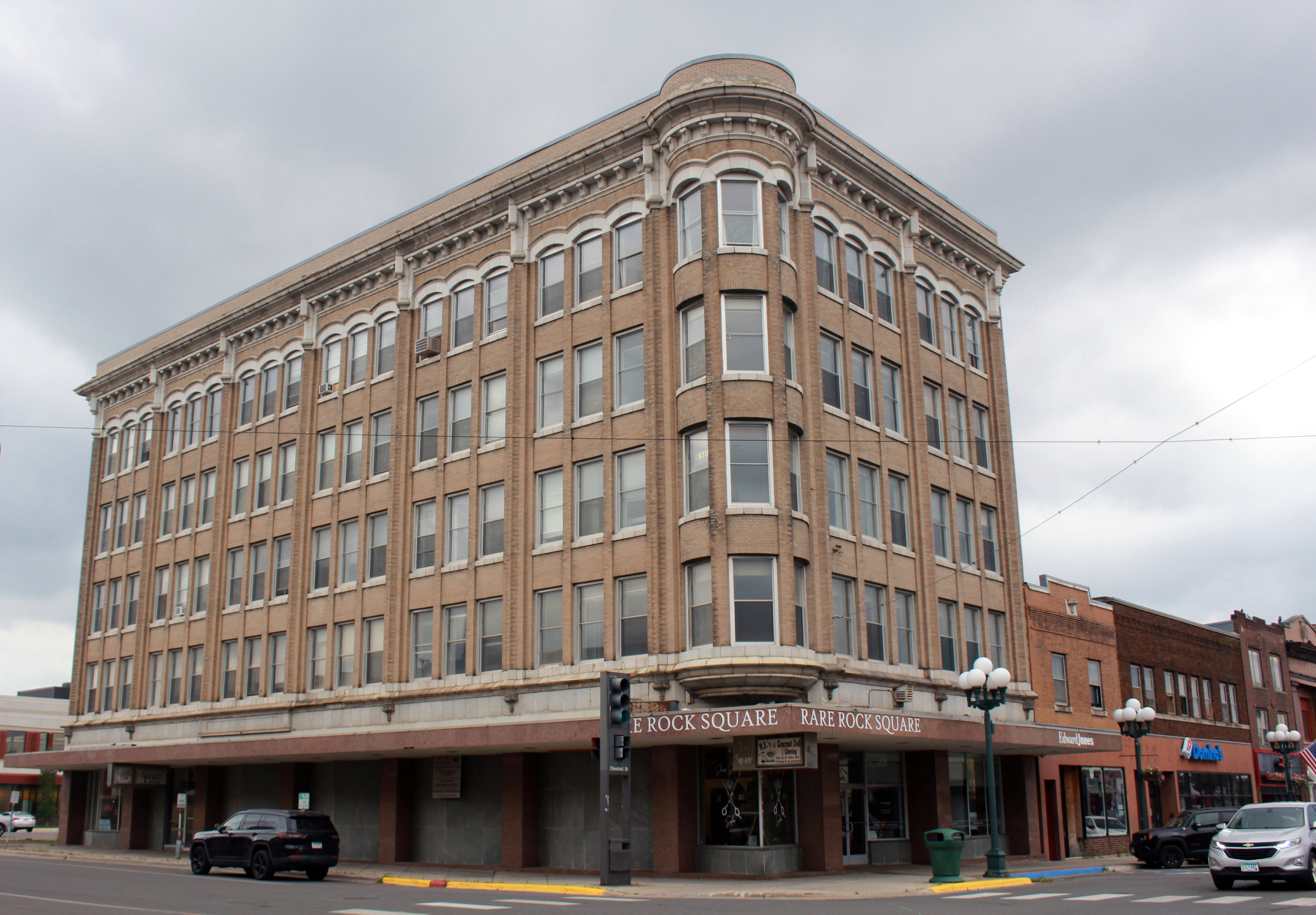
- Former First National Bank of Virginia building

- Location within Minnesota Location within the United States
- Location: Chestnut Street between 1st and 6th Avenues, Virginia, Minnesota
- Coordinates: 47°31′23″N 92°32′9″W
- Area: 13 acres (5.3 ha)
- Built: 1900–1941
- Architect: Edwin S. Radcliffe and Vernon Price, Liebenberg and Kaplan, Anthony W. Puck, Paul S. and Reuben Damberg
- NRHP reference No.: 97000020
- Added to NRHP: January 31, 1997

The Virginia Commercial Historic District is a defined area in downtown Virginia, Minnesota, recognized for its collection of historic commercial buildings constructed between 1900 and 1941. This historic district was officially listed on the National Register of Historic Places in 1997 because of its significance to commerce and its role in the economic development of the Iron Range region. It was nominated for representing an early-20th-century business district and Virginia's development as a mining boomtown and tourism gateway.

== Architectural Features ==
The district comprises 78 contributing structures, which exhibit a range of early twentieth-century commercial architectural forms. Buildings in the area were erected primarily with brick and stone, reflecting heightened concerns for fire safety and durability. Notable examples within the district include the former First National Bank of Virginia, the Roman Block building, and the Lyric Center for the Arts, formerly known as a vaudeville theater and opera venue.

== Chestnut Street ==
Chestnut Street serves as the central thoroughfare within the district, lined with historic buildings that housed businesses, hotels, dining establishments, and civic organizations. These structures served both residents and the many workers drawn to the region by mining opportunities, establishing Virginia as a significant commercial hub in northern Minnesota.

== Galley ==
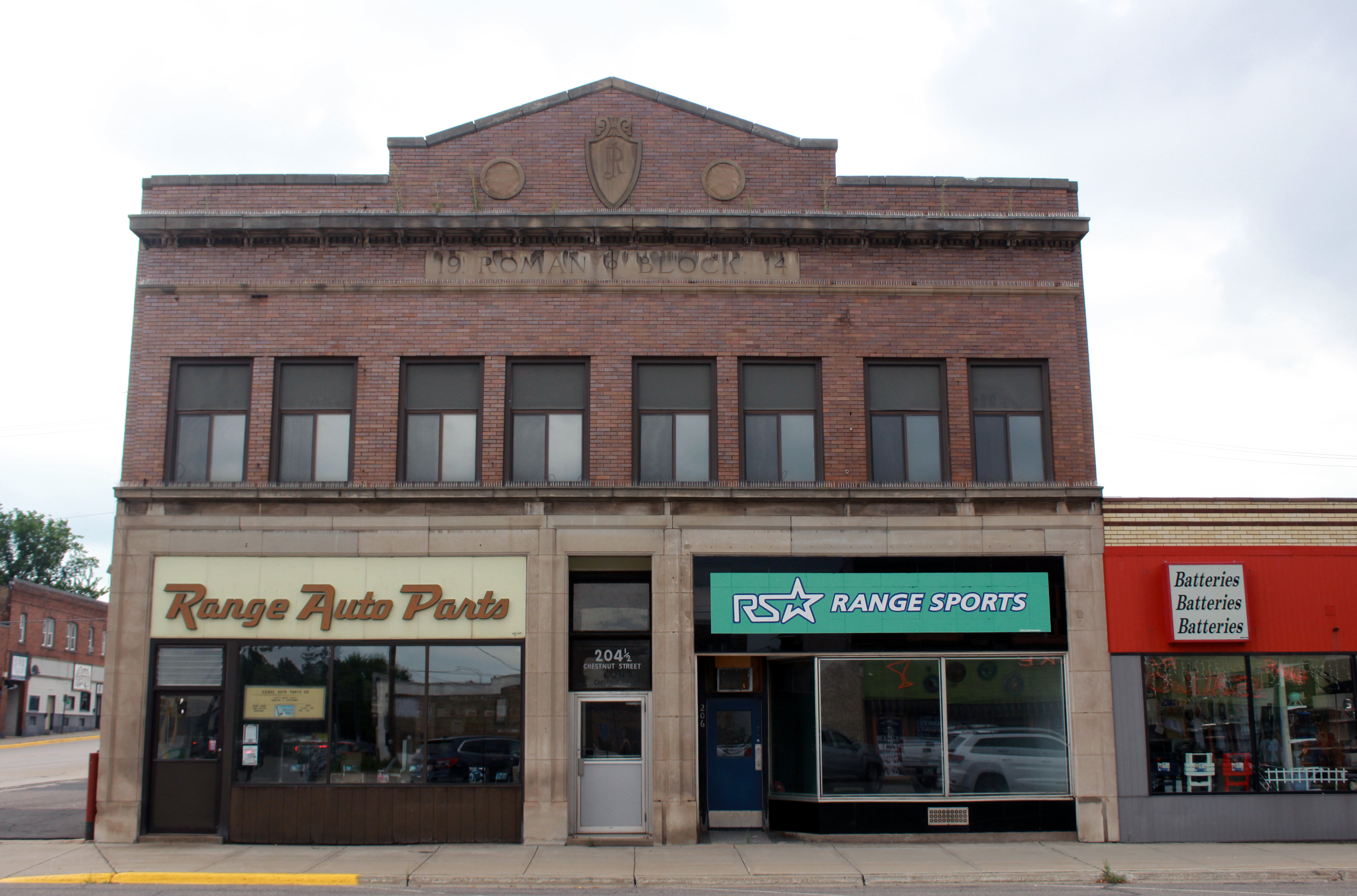
Roman Block building

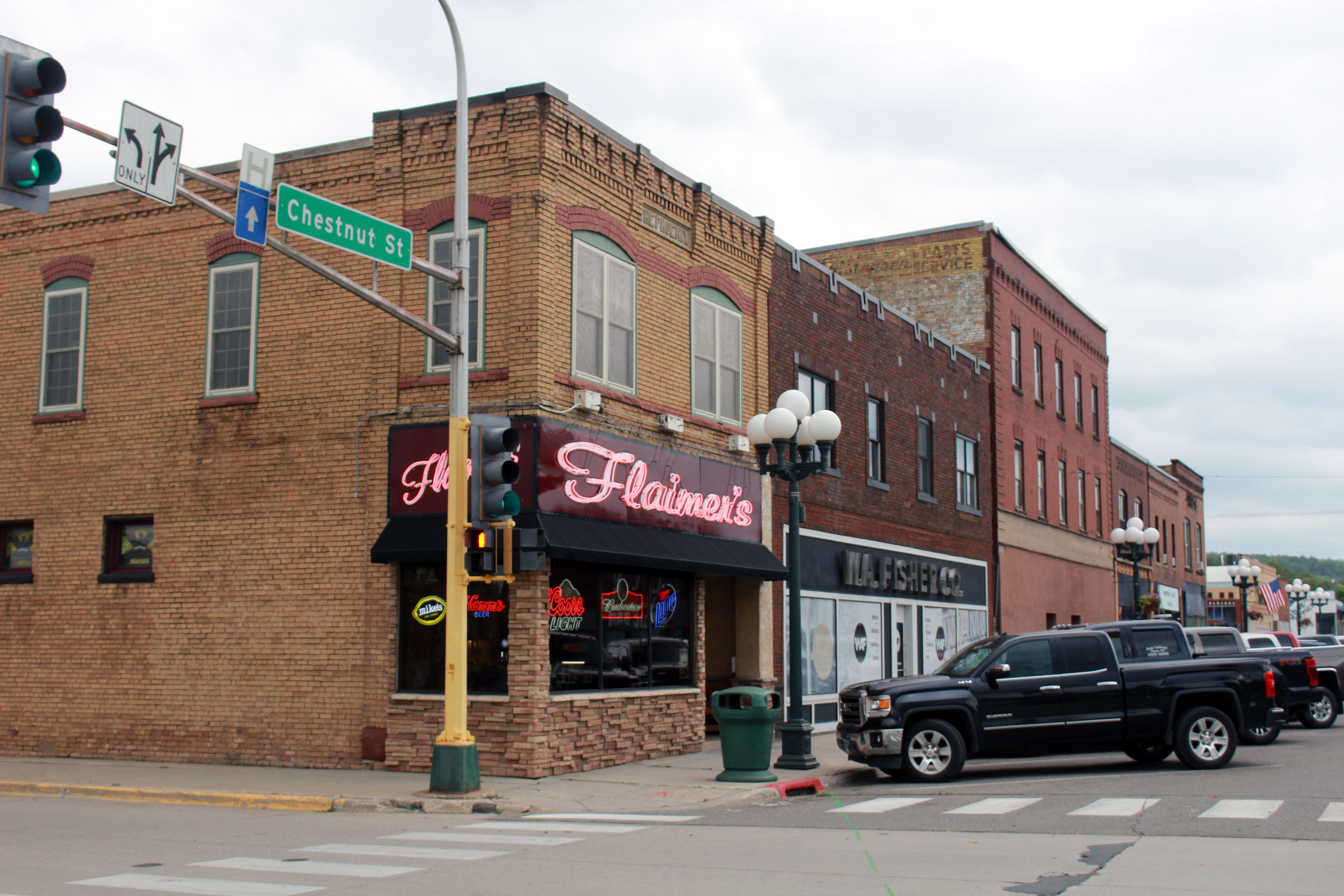
Chestnut Street at 2nd Avenue, Northeast corner

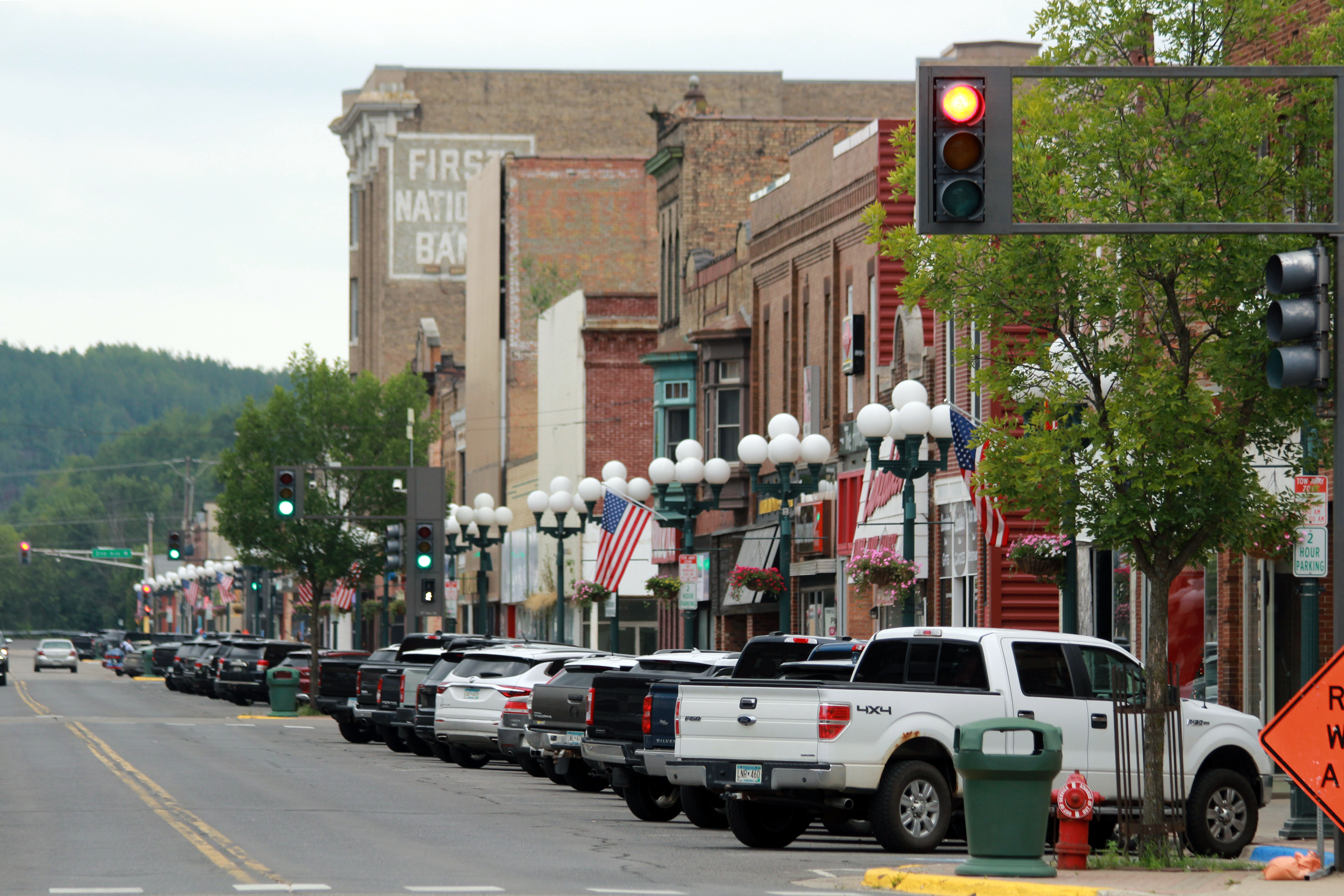
Chestnut Street between Third and Fourth Avenues, South side

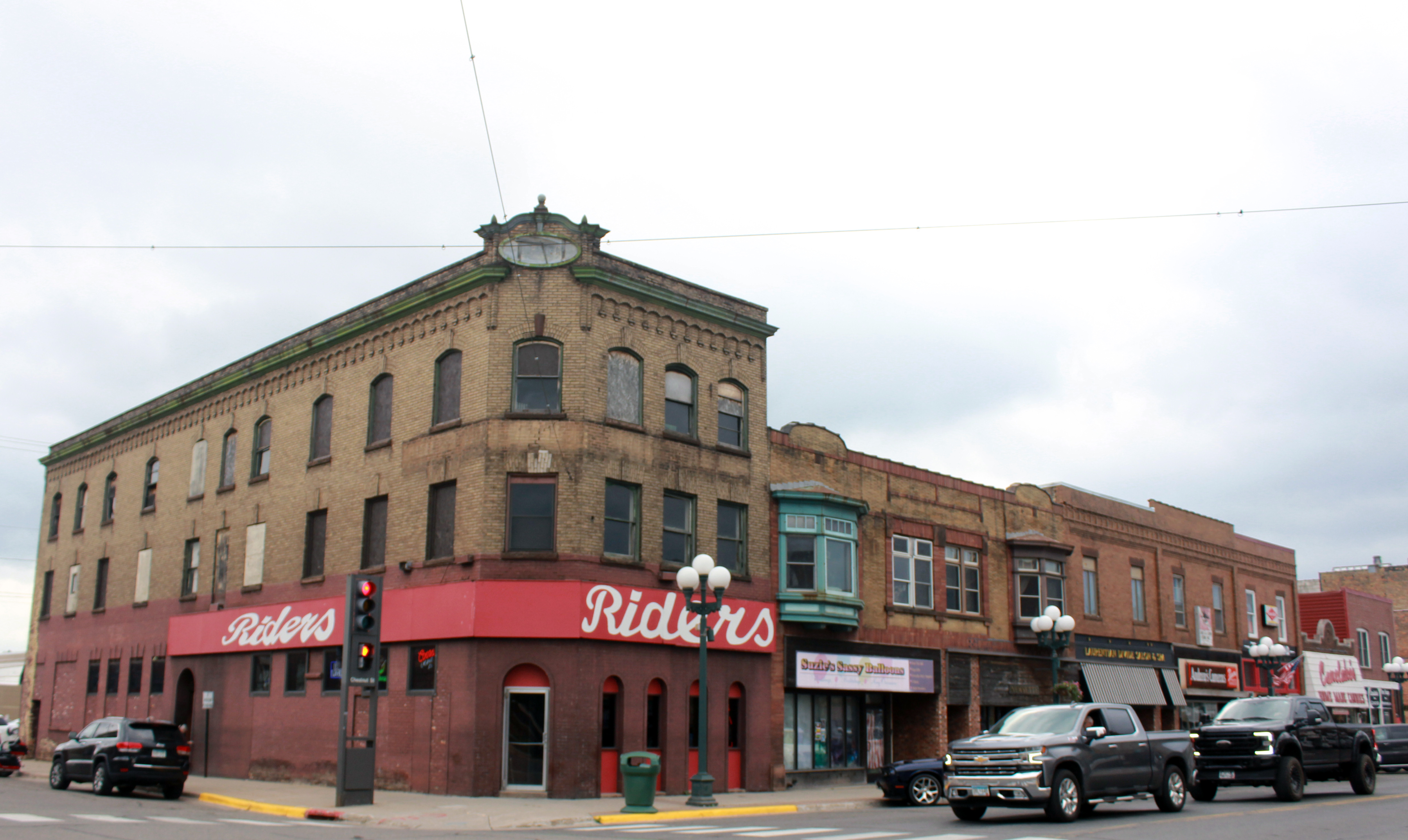
Chestnut Street at Fourth Avenue, Southwest corner

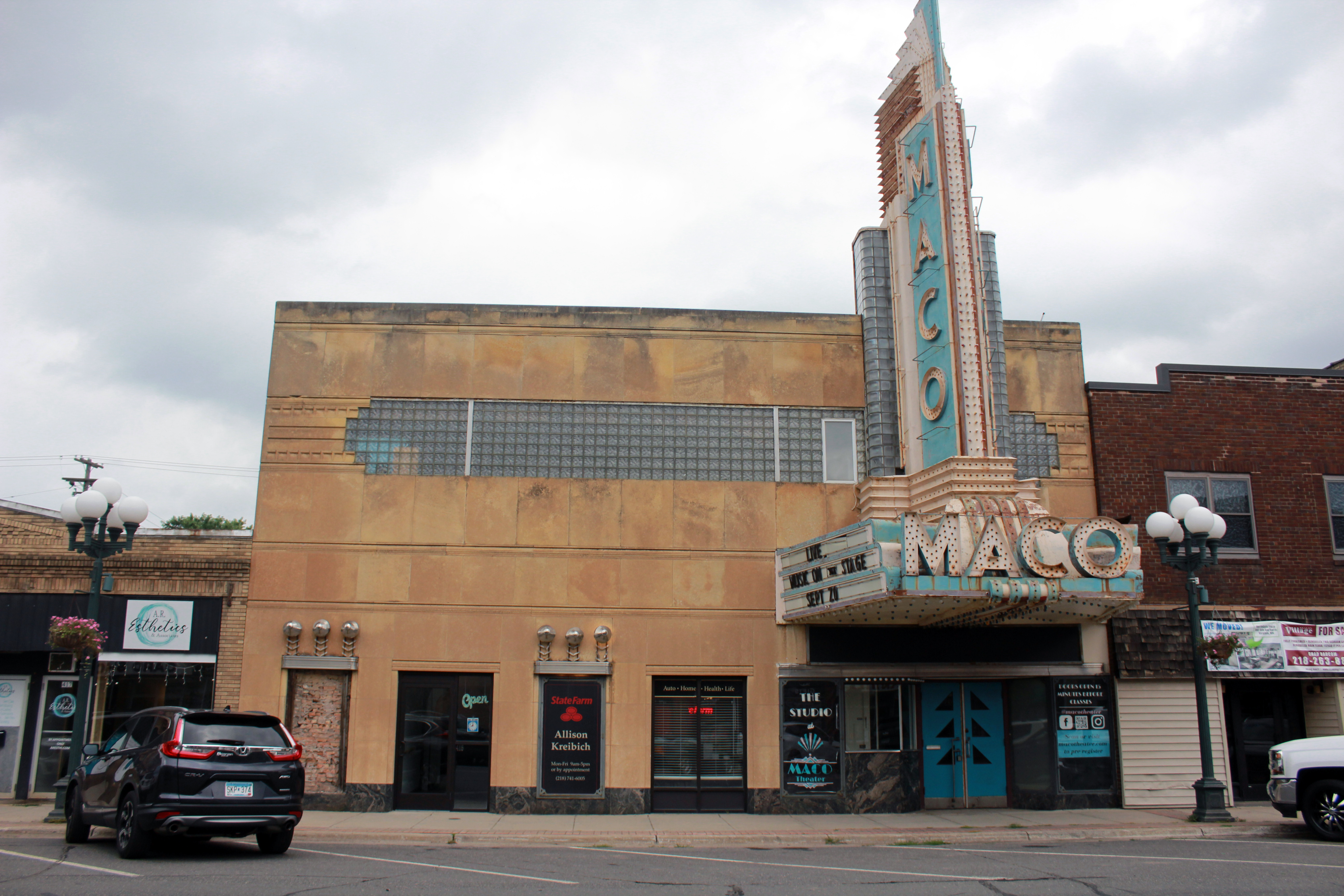
Maco Theater

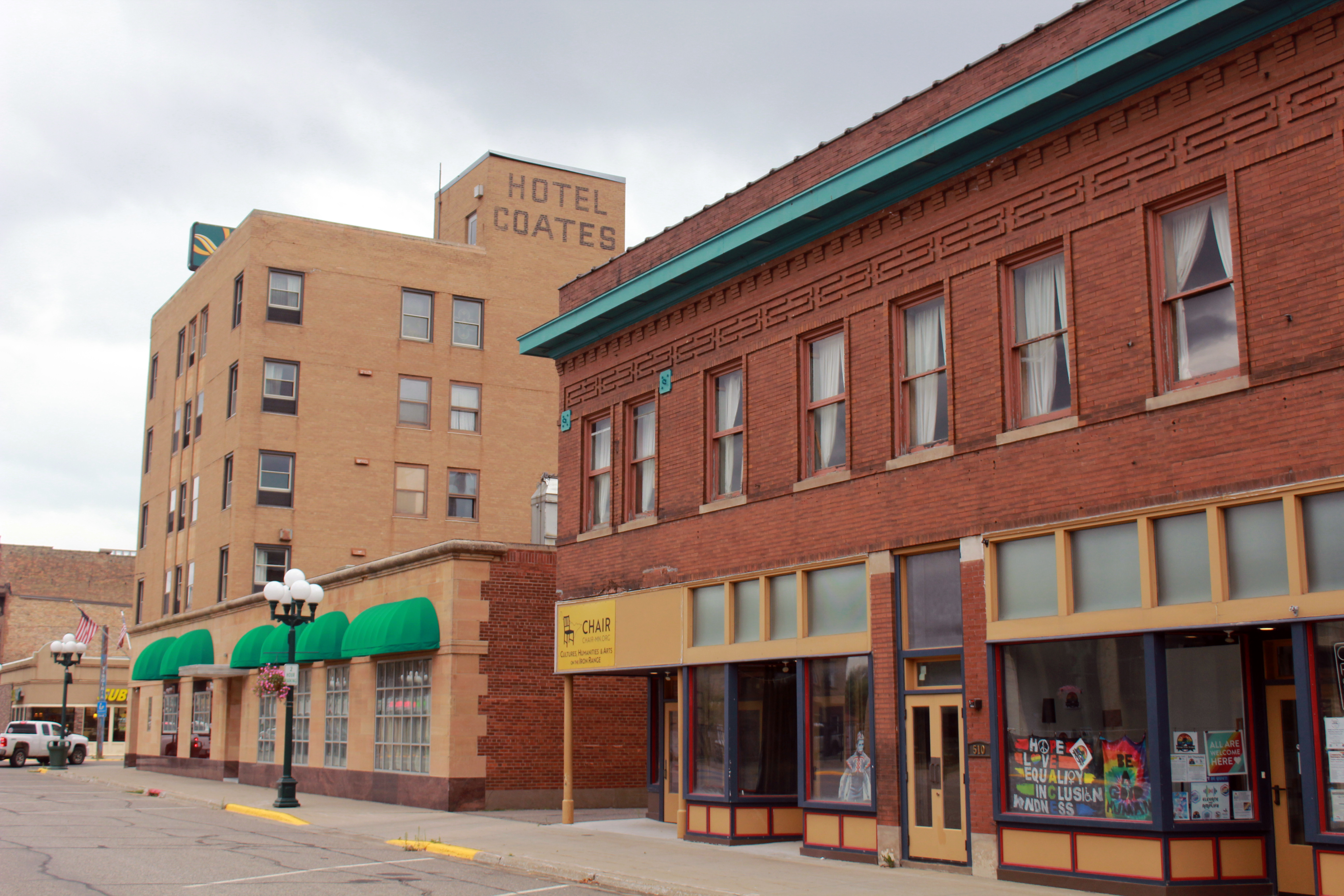
Hotel Coates and Lyric Theater

== See also ==
- National Register of Historic Places listings in St. Louis County, Minnesota
