= Lyric Center for the Arts =

Theater in Virginia, Minnesota

Lyric Theatre
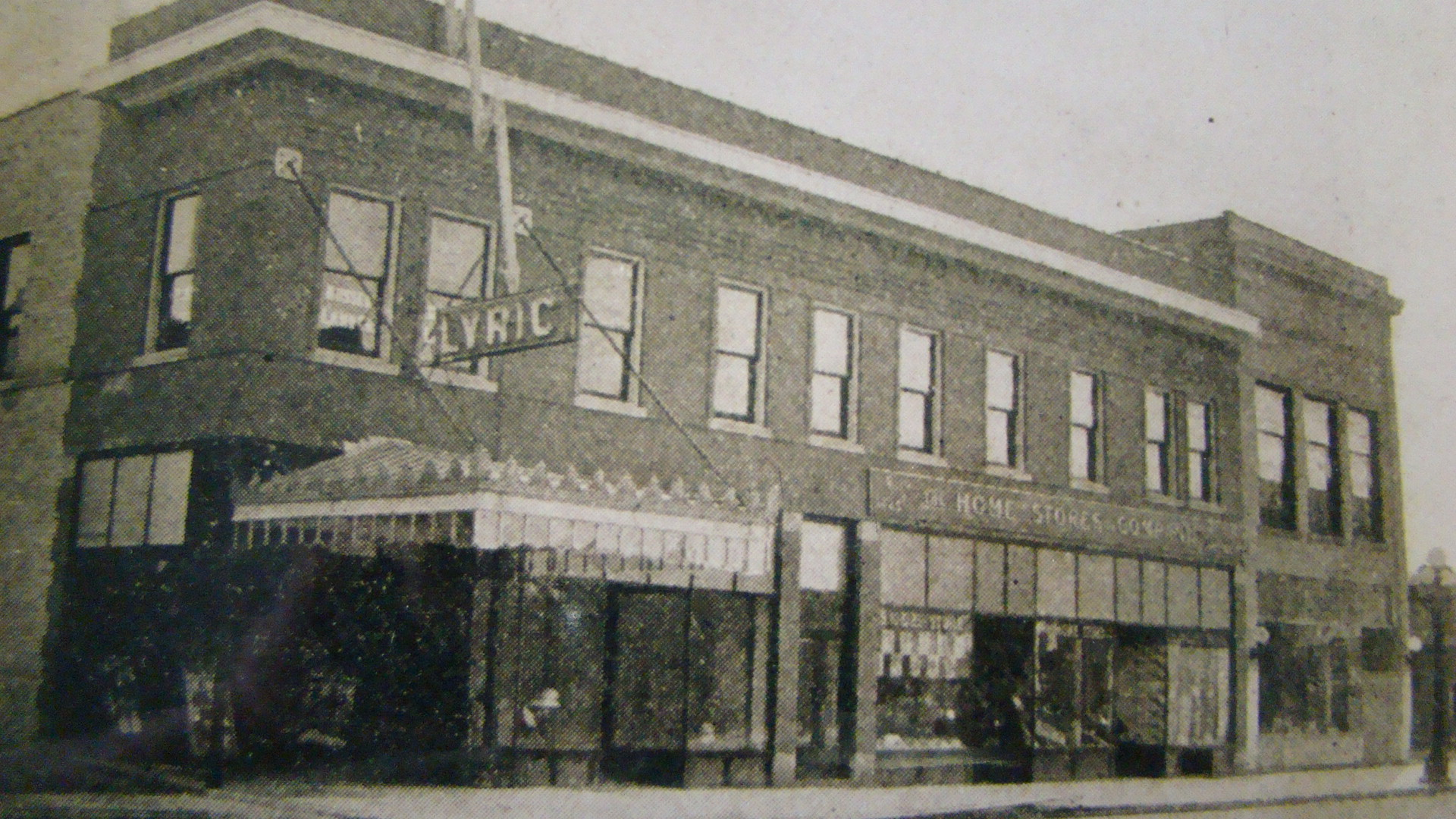
- The exterior of the Lyric Theatre, as it originally appeared in 1912
- Address: 510 Chestnut Street, Virginia, Minnesota; United States
- Type: Movie palace

Construction
- Opened: 1912
- Rebuilt: Redevelopment currently underway
- Years active: 1912–1950s
- Architect: Liebenberg and Kaplan

The Lyric Center for the Arts (aka Lyric Theater) is a historic theater in Virginia, Minnesota, United States.

== History ==
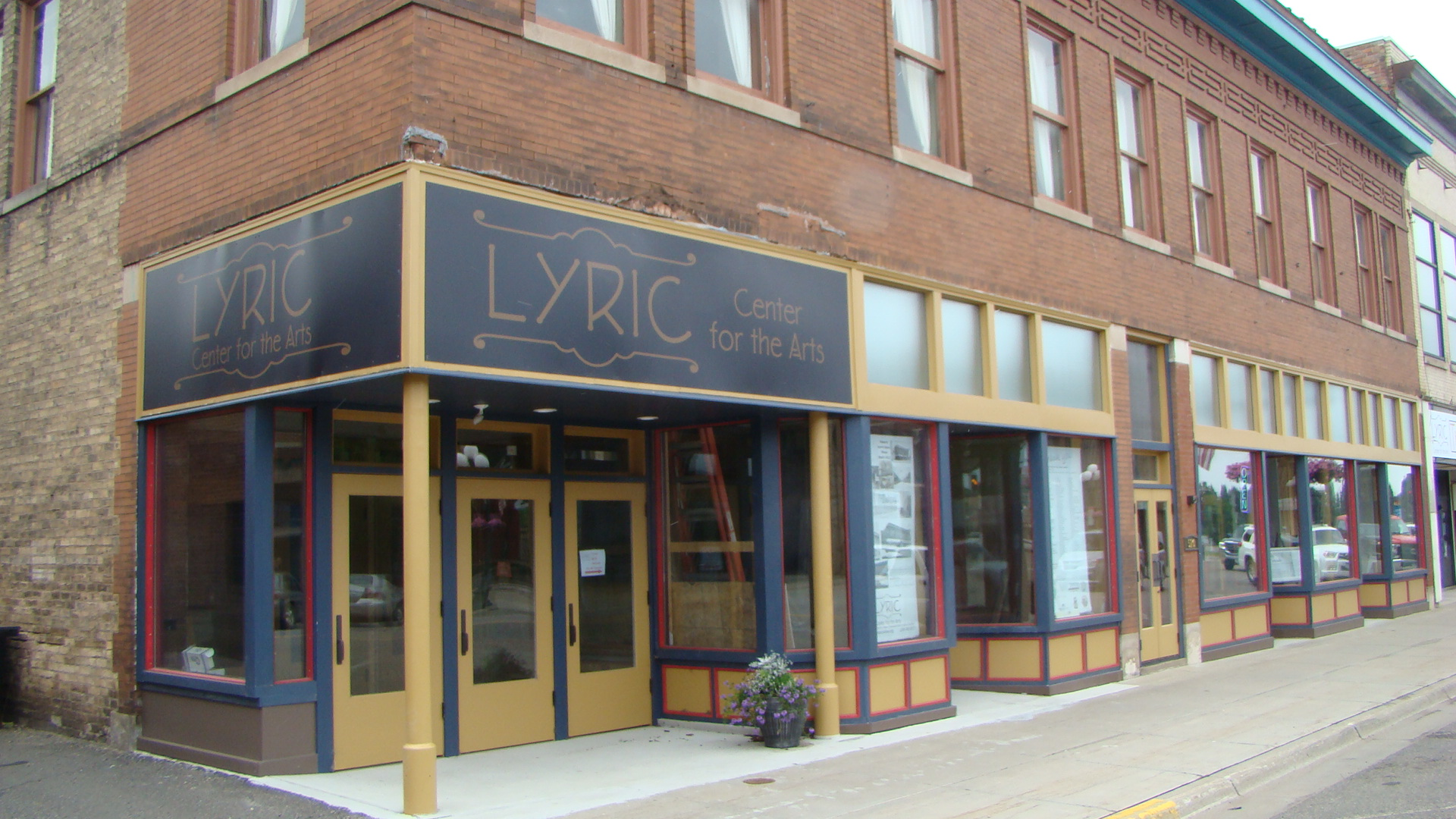
The Lyric Center today

The theater was originally built as a vaudeville/movie theater and opera house in 1912. Architects Franklin Ellerbe, Olin Round and William Sullivan (located in the Palladio Building in Duluth, Minnesota) designed the building in 1911. Virginia businessman Henry Sigel commissioned the architects to design an opera house to be built on the site of the McGarry Hotel, which burned to the ground during the catastrophic fire in Virginia in 1900.

The building was designed for use as a mixed-use commercial space, with the auditorium located behind a storefront space. The two-story auditorium was designed in a vernacular style fitting the current style and materials available. The second floor also houses a ballroom and a lounge.

The building was renamed the State Theater when it was remodeled in the 1930s by then-owner Paramount Studios, who utilized it as one of their cinema chain of State Theaters. The architect was Jack J. Liebenberg, who would later found the architectural firm Liebenberg and Kaplan in Minneapolis. The building remained in business as a movie theater until the 1950s.

The building is of special historic interest, and became a contributing property to the Virginia Commercial Historic District. At that time, the building was then purchased by the Laurentian Arts and Culture Alliance (LACA), with the intent to redevelop the building back to a functioning theater and arts centre.

The restoration of the building is being done in phases, with funds coming from various sources. The current owners, Laurentian Arts and Culture Alliance, have completed securing the building from further deterioration, remodeled a small portion for use as an art gallery, and completed reconstruction of front facade of the exterior storefront to restore original exits and comply with ADA regulations and modern building codes. The next phase will renovate the lobby area and create a 120-seat performance/multi-use space on the street level. Fundraising efforts have been steady and ongoing, with activities such as a GoFundMe page, as well as a summer silent film festival fundraiser.

While the main building is being restored, current events are being presented in the Lyric Annex building, next door to the main building. The Lyric Center is on track to become a regional hub for performing arts.
