= Marble, Minnesota =

City in Minnesota, United States

Marble
- City
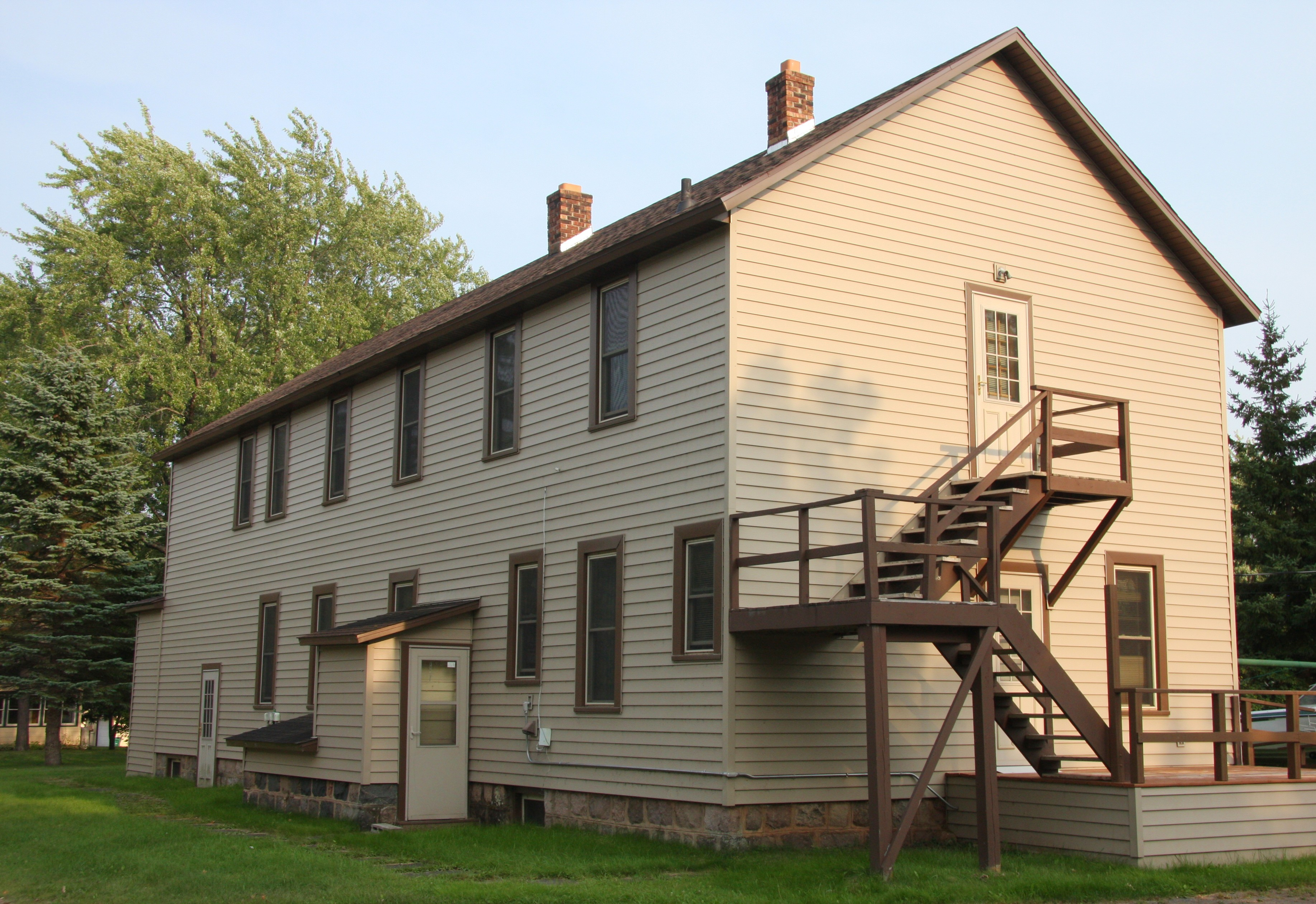
- Oliver Boarding House on Jessie Street in Marble, Minnesota

- Location of the city of Marble within Itasca County, Minnesota
- Coordinates: 47°19′10″N 93°17′46″W
- Country: United States
- State: Minnesota
- County: Itasca

Area
  - Total: 4.47 sq mi (11.59 km^{2})
  - Land: 4.37 sq mi (11.33 km^{2})
  - Water: 0.10 sq mi (0.26 km^{2})
- Elevation: 1,417 ft (432 m)

Population (2020)
  - Total: 610
  - Density: 139.5/sq mi (53.85/km^{2})
- Time zone: UTC-6 (Central (CST))
  - Summer (DST): UTC-5 (CDT)
- ZIP code: 55764
- Area code: 218
- FIPS code: 27-40418
- GNIS feature ID: 0657313
- Website: https://www.marblemn.com/

Marble is a city in Itasca County, Minnesota, United States. It is part of the chain of small mining towns known as the Iron Range. The population was 610 at the 2020 census.

U.S. Highway 169 serves as a main route in the community.

== Geography ==
According to the United States Census Bureau, the city has a total area of 4.45 square miles (11.53 km^{2}), of which 4.35 square miles (11.27 km^{2}) is land and 0.10 square miles (0.26 km^{2}) is water.

== Demographics ==
Historical population
Census	Pop.	Note	%±
1910	887		—
1920	742		−16.3%
1930	738		−0.5%
1940	792		7.3%
1950	867		9.5%
1960	879		1.4%
1970	682		−22.4%
1980	757		11.0%
1990	618		−18.4%
2000	695		12.5%
2010	701		0.9%
2020	610		−13.0%
U.S. Decennial Census

=== 2010 census ===
As of the census of 2010, there were 701 people, 281 households, and 174 families living in the city. The population density was 161.1 inhabitants per square mile (62.2/km^{2}). There were 315 housing units at an average density of 72.4 per square mile (28.0/km^{2}). The racial makeup of the city was 93.4% White, 0.6% African American, 3.1% Native American, 0.4% Asian, and 2.4% from two or more races. Hispanic or Latino of any race were 0.3% of the population.

There were 281 households, of which 32.7% had children under the age of 18 living with them, 41.6% were married couples living together, 13.9% had a female householder with no husband present, 6.4% had a male householder with no wife present, and 38.1% were non-families. 31.0% of all households were made up of individuals, and 9.6% had someone living alone who was 65 years of age or older. The average household size was 2.47 and the average family size was 3.04.

The median age in the city was 38.2 years. 27.8% of residents were under the age of 18; 6.2% were between the ages of 18 and 24; 26.6% were from 25 to 44; 25.6% were from 45 to 64; and 13.8% were 65 years of age or older. The gender makeup of the city was 53.5% male and 46.5% female.

=== 2000 census ===
As of the census of 2000, there were 695 people, 287 households, and 179 families living in the city. The population density was 161.3 inhabitants per square mile (62.3/km^{2}). There were 308 housing units at an average density of 71.5 per square mile (27.6/km^{2}). The racial makeup of the city was 96.83% White, 1.29% Native American, 0.29% Asian, 0.14% from other races, and 1.44% from two or more races. Hispanic or Latino of any race were 0.86% of the population.

There were 287 households, out of which 33.1% had children under the age of 18 living with them, 47.7% were married couples living together, 9.8% had a female householder with no husband present, and 37.3% were non-families. 31.4% of all households were made up of individuals, and 13.6% had someone living alone who was 65 years of age or older. The average household size was 2.42 and the average family size was 3.01.

In the city, the population was spread out, with 27.1% under the age of 18, 9.4% from 18 to 24, 26.5% from 25 to 44, 21.7% from 45 to 64, and 15.4% who were 65 years of age or older. The median age was 35 years. For every 100 females, there were 107.5 males. For every 100 females age 18 and over, there were 99.6 males.

The median income for a household in the city was $27,361, and the median income for a family was $36,667. Males had a median income of $25,875 versus $22,188 for females. The per capita income for the city was $14,620. About 11.2% of families and 15.8% of the population were below the poverty line, including 19.5% of those under age 18 and 8.6% of those age 65 or over.
