= Virginia, Minnesota =

City in Minnesota, United States

Virginia
- City
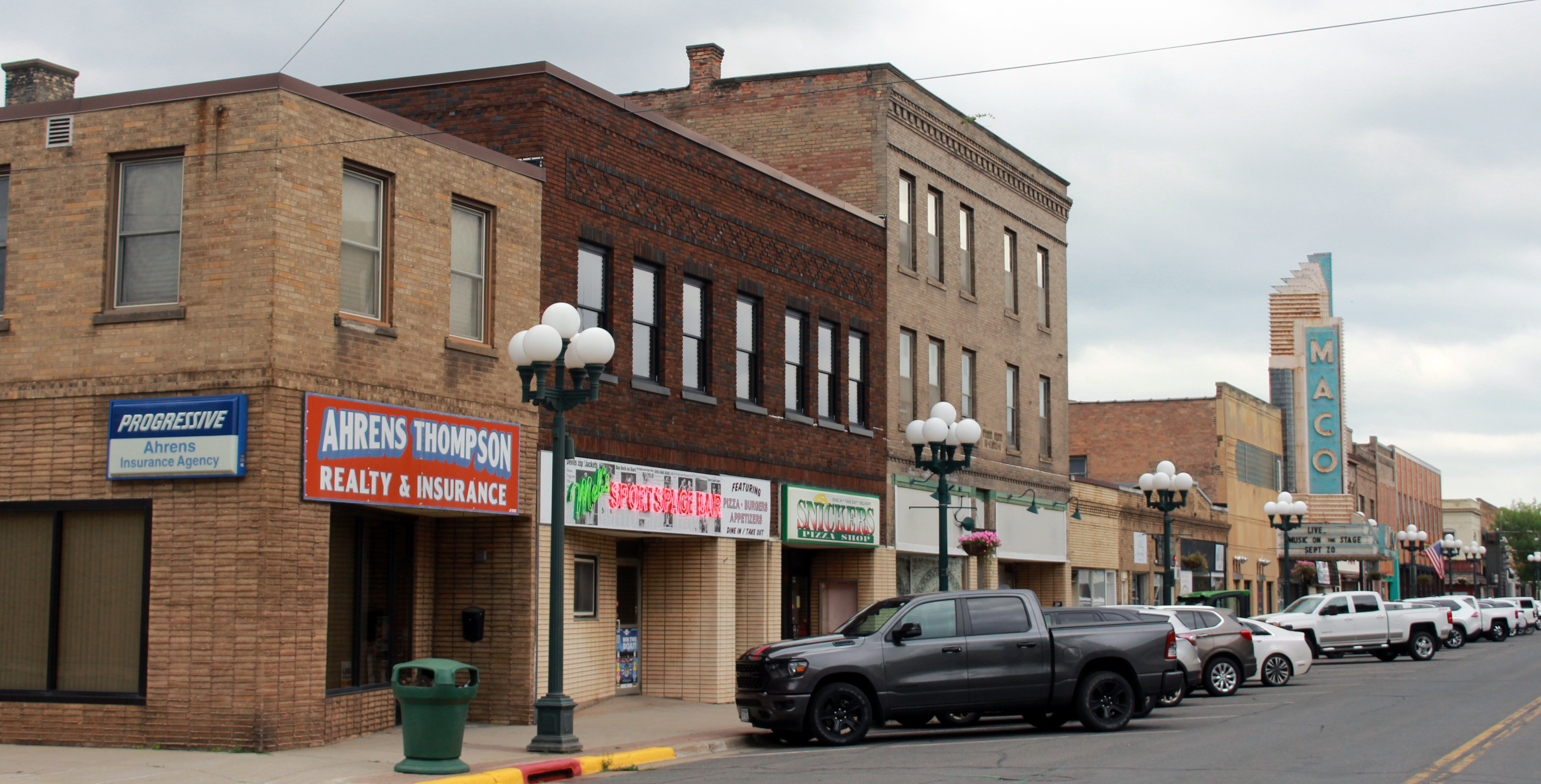
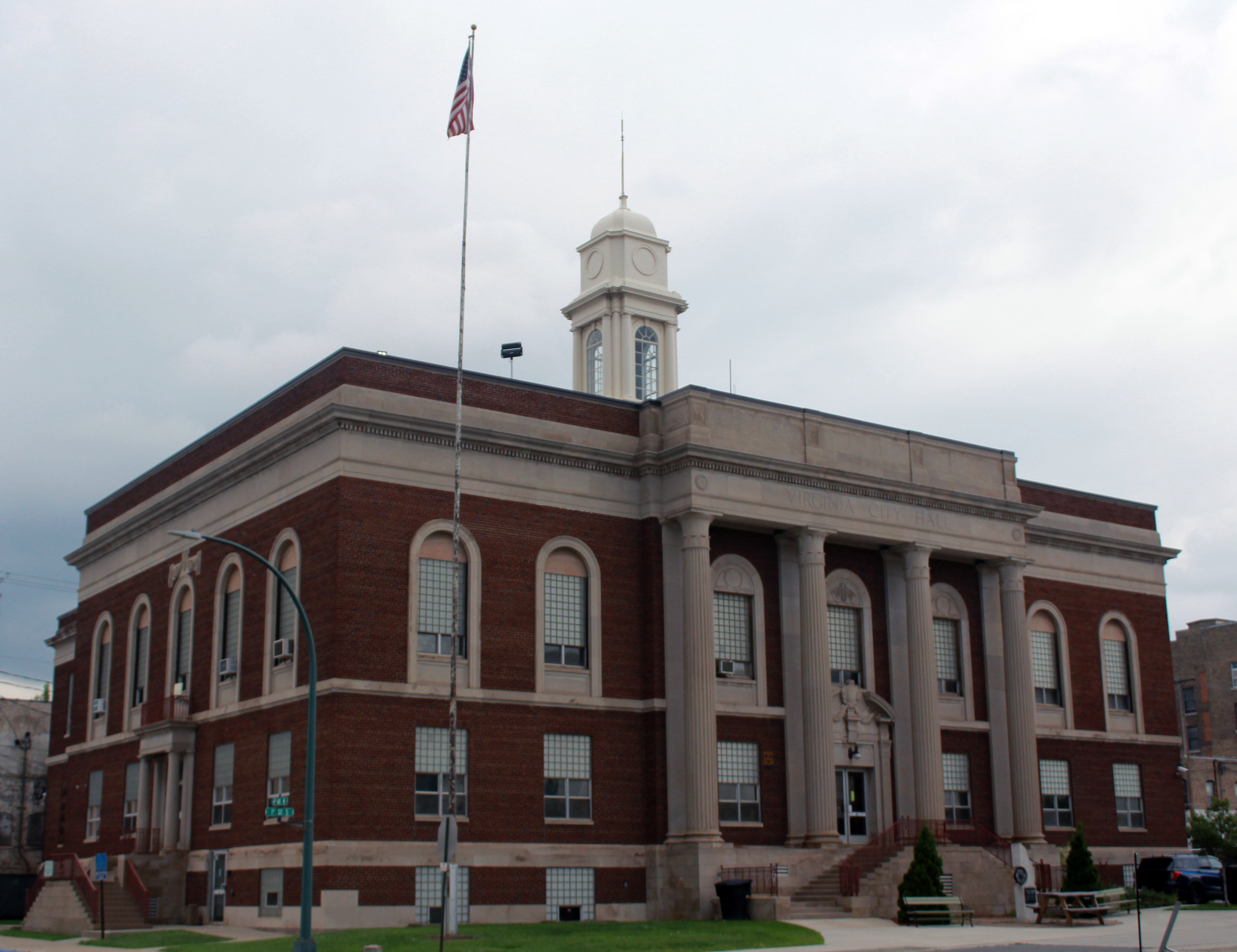
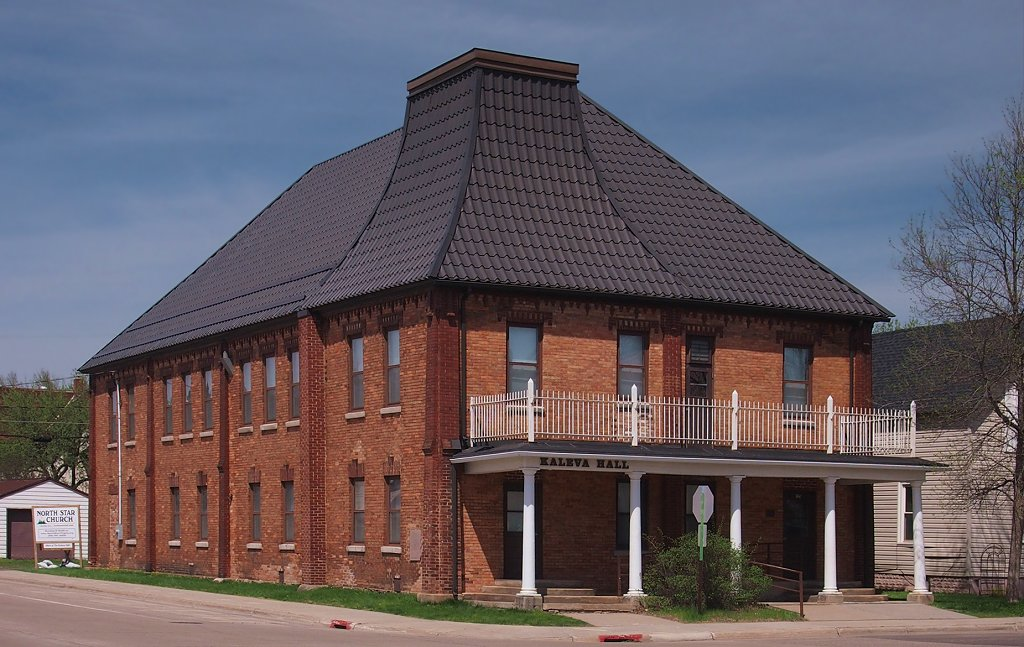
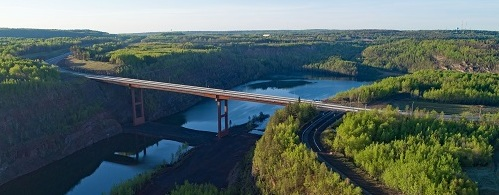
- Virginia Commercial Historic District Virginia City Hall Kaleva Hall Thomas Rukavina Memorial Bridge spanning above Rouchleau Mine

- Seal
- Nickname: Queen City of the North
- Location of the city of Virginia within St. Louis County, Minnesota
- Coordinates: 47°31′2″N 92°32′29″W
- Country: United States
- State: Minnesota
- County: St. Louis
- Established: March 1892
- Incorporated: February 1895
- Named for: U.S. state of Virginia

Government
  - Mayor: Larry A. Cuffe Jr.

Area
  - Total: 19.10 sq mi (49.46 km^{2})
  - Land: 18.77 sq mi (48.61 km^{2})
  - Water: 0.33 sq mi (0.85 km^{2})
- Elevation: 1,440 ft (439 m)

Population (2020)
  - Total: 8,421
  - Estimate (2022): 8,332
  - Density: 448.7/sq mi (173.23/km^{2})
- Time zone: UTC−6 (Central (CST))
  - Summer (DST): UTC−5 (CDT)
- ZIP codes: 55741, 55777, 55792
- Area code: 218
- FIPS code: 27-67288
- GNIS feature ID: 0662719
- Sales tax: 8.375%
- Website: www.virginiamn.us

Virginia is a city in St. Louis County, Minnesota, United States. With an economy heavily reliant on large-scale iron ore mining, Virginia is considered the Mesabi Iron Range's commercial center. The population was 8,421 at the 2020 census. Virginia is a part of the Duluth metropolitan area, and U.S. Highway 53 runs through town.

== History ==
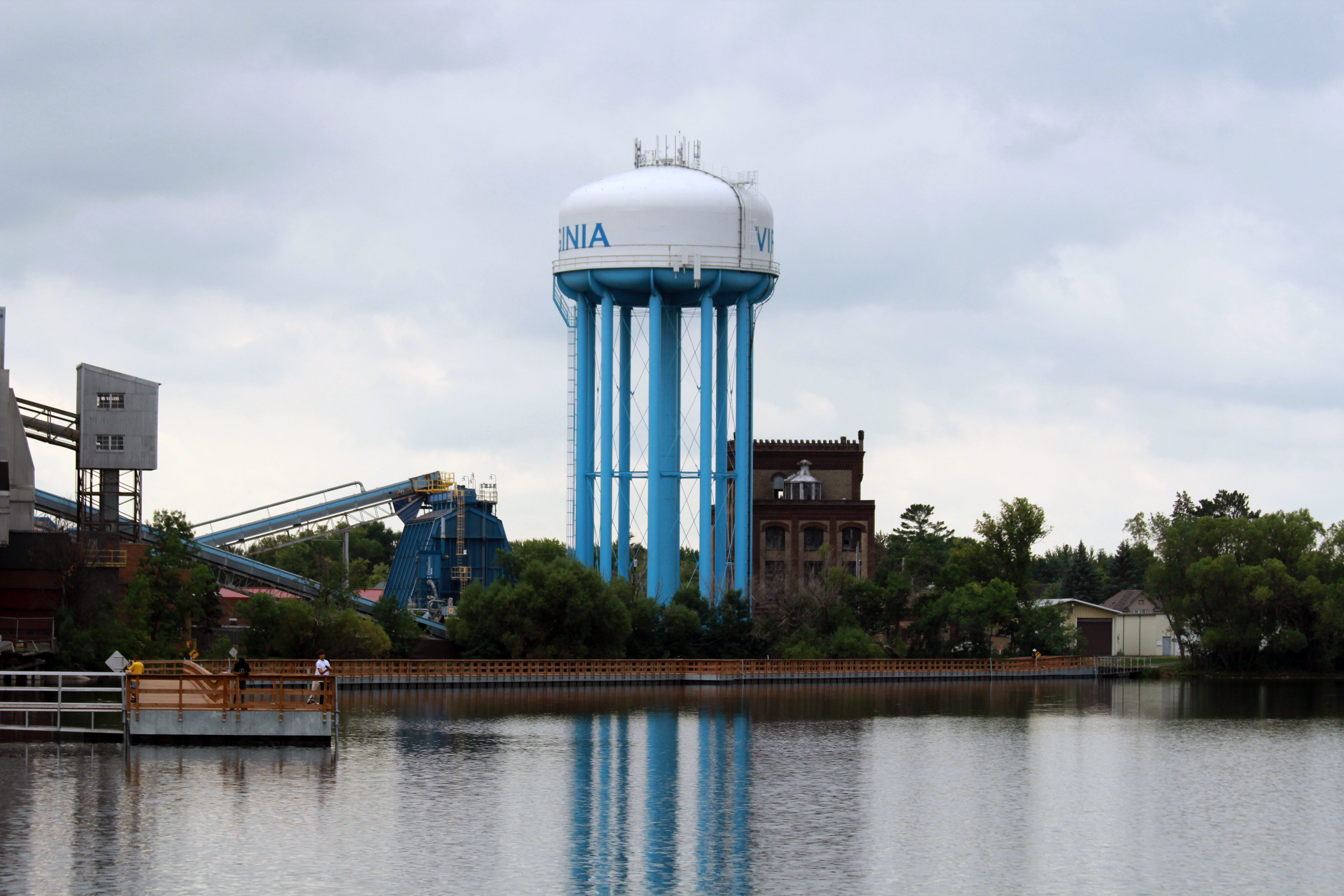
Water tower and Virginia Brewery

Virginia began as a logging settlement and experienced significant growth when the iron ore industry expanded. Orrin Day Kinney, the original owner of the land, founded the town. The site was planned in 1892 and named in honor of the home state of many local lumber workers at that time. A post office was established in Virginia in 1893. The city was incorporated in 1895. As the mining industry developed, mines in the area became highly productive, consistently breaking records for ore output by the late 1890s. The city’s main population increase started after the construction of mining camps for prominent business figures such as Andrew Carnegie, Leonidas Merritt, Jay Cooke, John D. Rockefeller, William J. Olcott, and James J. Hill. Mining operations relied on diamond drills, mules, and a large workforce to extract millions of tons of ore each year. The ore was shipped from the Twin Ports of Duluth and Superior, as well as Two Harbors.

The commercial heart of Virginia endured two catastrophic fires in 1893 and 1900, with the second leading to the complete destruction of the downtown business area. In response, city ordinances were enacted mandating the use of brick for new commercial construction along Chestnut Street, which subsequently led to the establishment of a durable and fire-resistant downtown core. Many properties in this historic district were operated by early immigrant families from Finland, Sweden, Slovenia, and Croatia, along with other European countries who contributed to the city’s economic landscape. These groups, drawn by mining and industrial jobs, became major parts of the business community and established various enterprises in the city’s commercial district.

The City of Franklin was consolidated into the City of Virginia.

== Virginia Commercial Historic District ==
The Virginia Commercial Historic District is a designation applied to Virginia's historic downtown. It comprises 78 contributing properties built from 1900 to 1941. It was listed as a historic district on the National Register of Historic Places in 1997 for its local significance in commerce. It was nominated for representing an early-20th-century business district and Virginia's development as a mining boomtown and tourism gateway.

== Geography ==
According to the United States Census Bureau, the city has an area of 19.18 square miles (49.68 km^{2}); 18.85 square miles (48.82 km^{2}) is land and 0.33 square miles (0.85 km^{2}) is water. Lakes in Virginia include Silver Lake and Bailey Lake. An Ojibwe tribe originally named the area Qeechaquepagem, which roughly means "lake of the north birds".

Virginia is part of the Quad Cities, along with Eveleth, Gilbert, and Mountain Iron.

=== Climate ===
The Köppen Climate Classification subtype for this climate is "Dfb" (Warm Summer Continental Climate). Summers are warm, sometimes hot, and winters are severely cold.

Climate data for Virginia, Minnesota
Month	Jan	Feb	Mar	Apr	May	Jun	Jul	Aug	Sep	Oct	Nov	Dec	Year
Mean daily maximum °C (°F)	−9 (16)	−4 (24)	2 (36)	11 (51)	19 (66)	23 (74)	25 (77)	24 (75)	18 (64)	11 (52)	1 (33)	−6 (21)	9 (49)
Mean daily minimum °C (°F)	−21 (−6)	−17 (2)	−10 (14)	−3 (27)	4 (39)	9 (48)	12 (53)	11 (51)	6 (43)	0 (32)	−8 (17)	−17 (1)	−3 (27)
Average precipitation mm (inches)	20 (0.8)	13 (0.5)	28 (1.1)	41 (1.6)	69 (2.7)	120 (4.6)	99 (3.9)	94 (3.7)	86 (3.4)	64 (2.5)	36 (1.4)	18 (0.7)	690 (27.1)
Source: Weatherbase

== Demographics ==
Historical population
Census	Pop.	Note	%±
1900	2,962		—
1910	10,473		253.6%
1920	14,022		33.9%
1930	11,963		−14.7%
1940	12,264		2.5%
1950	12,486		1.8%
1960	14,034		12.4%
1970	12,450		−11.3%
1980	11,056		−11.2%
1990	9,410		−14.9%
2000	9,157		−2.7%
2010	8,712		−4.9%
2020	8,421		−3.3%
2022 (est.)	8,332		−1.1%
U.S. Decennial Census; 2020 Census

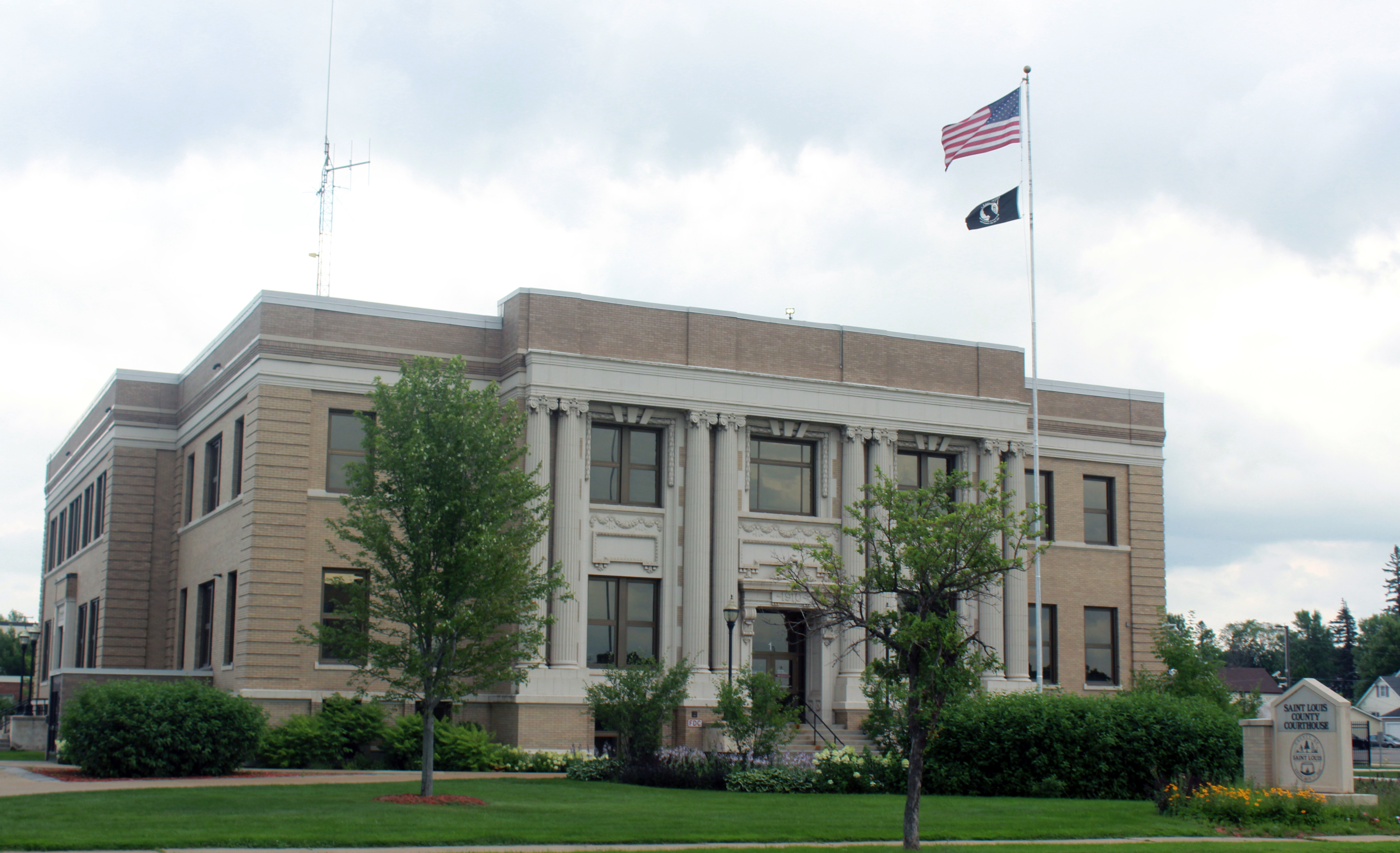
St. Louis County District Courthouse

=== 2020 census ===
As of the 2020 census, Virginia had a population of 8,421. The median age was 43.5 years. 20.0% of residents were under the age of 18 and 24.6% of residents were 65 years of age or older. For every 100 females there were 95.2 males, and for every 100 females age 18 and over there were 92.2 males age 18 and over.

95.0% of residents lived in urban areas, while 5.0% lived in rural areas.

There were 4,100 households in Virginia, of which 20.9% had children under the age of 18 living in them. Of all households, 29.2% were married-couple households, 25.6% were households with a male householder and no spouse or partner present, and 37.3% were households with a female householder and no spouse or partner present. About 48.2% of all households were made up of individuals and 22.8% had someone living alone who was 65 years of age or older.

There were 4,735 housing units, of which 13.4% were vacant. The homeowner vacancy rate was 3.2% and the rental vacancy rate was 11.0%.

Racial composition as of the 2020 census
Race	Number	Percent
White	7,360	87.4%
Black or African American	198	2.4%
American Indian and Alaska Native	281	3.3%
Asian	43	0.5%
Native Hawaiian and Other Pacific Islander	4	0.0%
Some other race	41	0.5%
Two or more races	494	5.9%
Hispanic or Latino (of any race)	164	1.9%

=== 2010 census ===
As of the census of 2010, there were 8,712 people, 4,242 households, and 2,019 families living in the city. The population density was 462.2 inhabitants per square mile (178.5/km^{2}). There were 4,738 housing units at an average density of 251.4 per square mile (97.1/km^{2}). The racial makeup of the city was 94.7% White, 0.6% African American, 1.0% Native American, 0.5% Asian, 0.3% from other races, and 2.9% from two or more races. Hispanic or Latino of any race were 1.5% of the population.

There were 4,242 households, of which 21.8% had children under the age of 18 living with them, 31.7% were married couples living together, 12.0% had a female householder with no husband present, 4.0% had a male householder with no wife present, and 52.4% were non-families. 46.3% of all households were made up of individuals, and 20% had someone living alone who was 65 years of age or older. The average household size was 1.95 and the average family size was 2.74.

The median age in the city was 44.9 years. 18.9% of residents were under the age of 18; 9.3% were between the ages of 18 and 24; 21.8% were from 25 to 44; 27.9% were from 45 to 64; and 22% were 65 years of age or older. The gender makeup of the city was 47.9% male and 52.1% female.

=== 2000 census ===
As of the census of 2000, there were 9,157 people, 4,333 households, and 2,270 families living in the city. The population density was 486.1 inhabitants per square mile (187.7/km^{2}). There were 4,692 housing units at an average density of 249.1 per square mile (96.2/km^{2}). The racial makeup of the city was 95.17% White, 0.46% African American, 2.24% Native American, 0.55% Asian, 0.01% Pacific Islander, 0.17% from other races, and 1.40% from two or more races. Hispanic or Latino of any race were 0.80% of the population. 21.4% were of Finnish, 13.3% German, 9.9% Norwegian, 8.8% Italian, and 7.8% Swedish ancestry.

There were 4,333 households, out of which 22.5% had children under the age of 18 living with them, 38.4% were married couples living together, 10.7% had a female householder with no husband present, and 47.6% were non-families. 42.6% of all households were made up of individuals, and 19.6% had someone living alone who was 65 years of age or older. The average household size was 2.00 and the average family size was 2.73.

In the city, the population was spread out, with 19.0% under the age of 18, 9.4% from 18 to 24, 25.0% from 25 to 44, 23.3% from 45 to 64, and 23.2% who were 65 years of age or older. The median age was 43 years. For every 100 females, there were 88.4 males. For every 100 females age 18 and over, there were 85.9 males.

The median income for a household in the city was $28,873, and the median income for a family was $43,419. Males had a median income of $38,834 versus $22,473 for females. The per capita income for the city was $17,776. About 10.6% of families and 15.9% of the population were below the poverty line, including 16.6% of those under age 18 and 10.0% of those age 65 or over.

== Politics ==
Presidential election results

Precinct General Election Results
Year	Republican	Democratic	Third parties
2024	50.1% 2,056	47.5% 1,950	2.3% 96
2020	47.8% 2,040	50.0% 2,134	2.2% 98
2016	44.1% 1,854	47.0% 1,976	8.9% 375
2012	34.5% 1,607	62.3% 2,902	3.2% 148
2008	33.4% 1,612	64.0% 3,090	2.6% 125
2004	32.1% 1,595	66.6% 3,310	1.3% 66
2000	30.5% 1,453	60.8% 2,901	8.7% 416
1996	23.3% 1,066	66.3% 3,036	10.4% 479
1992	20.8% 1,064	62.2% 3,183	17.0% 871
1988	27.5% 1,476	72.5% 3,885	0.0% 0
1984	30.4% 1,790	69.6% 4,102	0.0% 0
1980	32.7% 2,004	59.4% 3,637	7.8% 479
1976	34.1% 2,296	64.0% 4,309	1.9% 130
1968	28.6% 1,829	69.4% 4,429	2.0% 128
1964	28.5% 1,968	71.4% 4,935	0.1% 12
1960	39.7% 2,809	60.1% 4,254	0.2% 11

== Economy ==
Virginia is on the Mesabi Range, part of northeastern Minnesota’s Iron Range, a region historically known for iron ore mining. While mining remains important to the broader area, Virginia has diversified its economy. The city serves as a commercial, healthcare, and service hub for nearby communities, aided by its location along U.S. Highway 53 and proximity to other towns on the Range. Retail plays a significant role in Virginia's economy, with national chains like Target and Walmart operating alongside independent businesses downtown and along the highway corridor.

Healthcare is a major employer, with Essentia Health–Virginia providing medical services to much of the central Iron Range and standing as one of the city's largest institutions. Other economic sectors include transportation, warehousing, and companies supporting mining and industrial activities. Tourism also contributes seasonally, as visitors come for outdoor recreation, nearby lakes, and events such as the Land of the Loon festival. In 2023, Virginia strengthened its role as an educational center with the opening of a new consolidated high school campus under Rock Ridge Public Schools, serving students from multiple communities in the region.

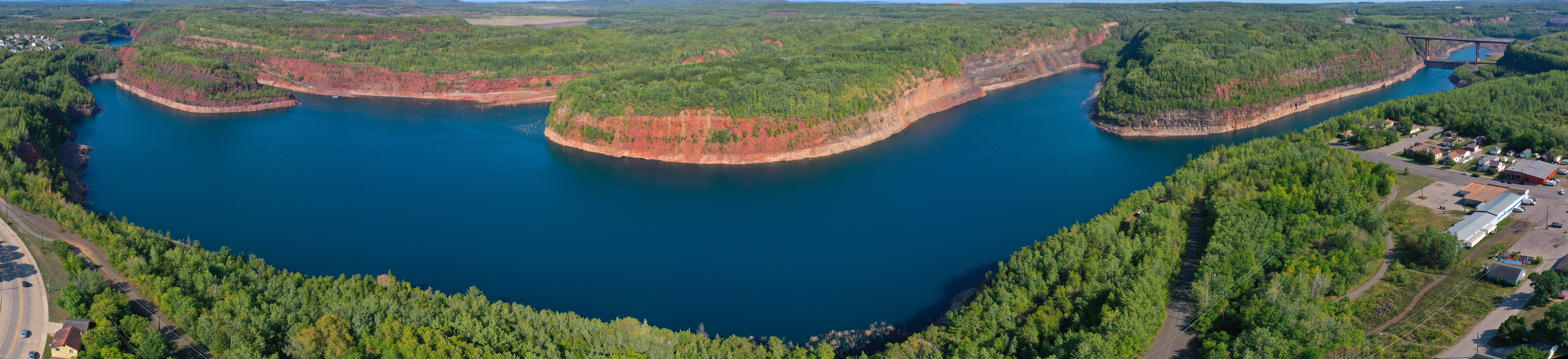
The Rouchleau open pit iron mine, now closed

== Arts and culture ==
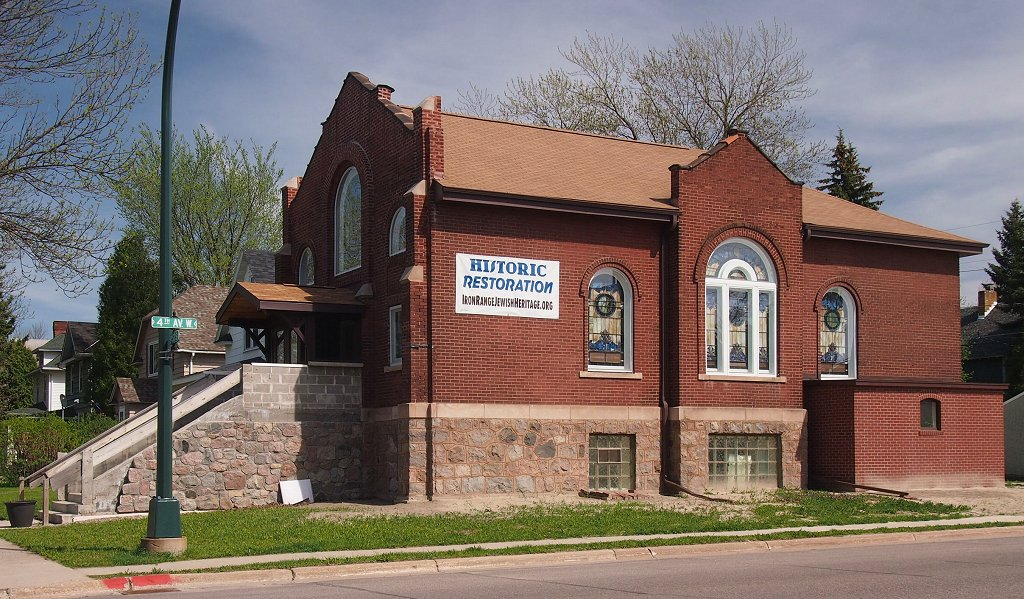
B'nai Abraham Museum and Cultural Center

Virginia is home to several annual events that celebrate its culture and traditions. Each June, the city hosts the Land of the Loon festival, which includes a parade, artisan market, food vendors, and cultural exhibitions that highlight the Iron Range's immigrant heritage. The Range Iron Pride Festival takes place in August and focuses on LGBTQ+ pride and supporting diversity in the region. Other major events include the Brewfest at Olcott Park, where regional craft breweries and live music are featured, and the Virginia Food Truck Festival, which is held on Main Street.

=== Points of interest ===
B'nai Abraham Synagogue: A restored early 20th-century synagogue now used as a cultural and historical interpretive site.

Laurentian Divide: A geographical landmark just north of the city, representing a continental hydrological divide.

Lyric Center for the Arts: Located in the historic Lyric Opera House, this venue supports local performing arts and visual arts through shows, exhibits, and educational programs.

Mesabi Trail: A paved recreational trail that passes through Virginia and connects communities across the Iron Range.

Olcott Park Greenhouse: A city-operated public greenhouse featuring botanical displays and seasonal programming.

==== Socialist Opera House ====
In the early 20th century, socialist Finns in Virginia founded the cooperative Socialist Opera House, which hosted plays and political meetings. The opera house also became home to the local Industrial Workers of the World (IWW) chapter. During the 1916 Mesabi strike, the IWW used the opera house as a headquarters. In 1955, the local United Brotherhood of Carpenters and Joiners union bought the property and converted it into an office building.

== Urban area ==
Virginia is part of a cluster of communities in northeastern Minnesota commonly referred to as the central Mesabi Iron Range. The immediate urban area includes Virginia, Hibbing, Mountain Iron, Eveleth, Gilbert, Chisholm, and Fayal Township.

Virginia is about 60 miles north of Duluth, which anchors the Duluth–Superior metropolitan area. Virginia is included in the Duluth MN–WI Metropolitan Statistical Area, Minnesota's second-largest metropolitan region by population.

== Parks and recreation ==
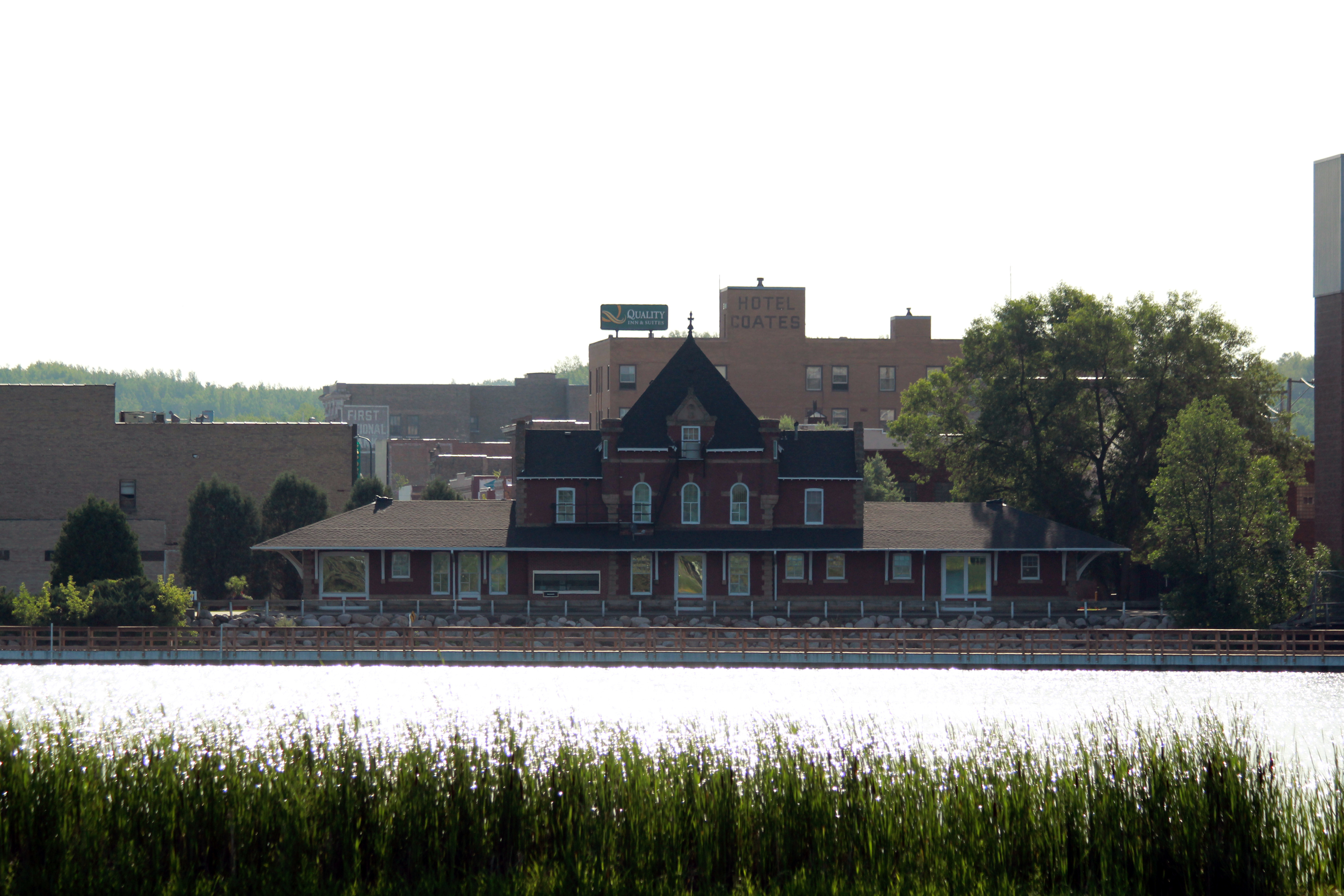
Looking across Silver Lake at former train depot

Virginia maintains various public parks, trails, and recreational facilities that serve residents and visitors throughout the year.

Olcott Park, near the center of the city, spans approximately 40 acres. It features open green space, a bandshell used for summer concerts, and a stone fountain built in 1937 through a Works Progress Administration (WPA) project and restored and reactivated in 2019. The park is also home to the Olcott Park Greenhouse, a city-operated botanical facility that features tropical and seasonal plants and is open to the public year-round.

East of downtown, Silver Lake Park includes picnic shelters, a public boat launch, shoreline access, and paved trails. The adjacent Silver Lake Trail forms a walking and biking loop around the lake.

Bridgeview Park, near the east end of Chestnut Street, offers elevated views of the Tom Rukavina Memorial Bridge, which spans the Rouchleau Mine Pit. The park features interpretive signage, benches, and access to the Mesabi Trail trailhead.

Southside Park, in the southern part of the city, includes athletic fields used for youth baseball, softball, and soccer programs.

The Iron Trail Motors Event Center (ITMEC) opened in 2021. The 120,000-square-foot facility includes two indoor ice arenas, a fitness center, a ballroom, and community meeting rooms. It serves as the home rink for Rock Ridge High School and hosts public skating, tournaments, and other events.

The Virginia Indoor Tennis and Pickleball Club, formerly known as Tennis for All, is at 1310 South 5th Avenue. The facility includes 12 acrylic courts—six indoor and six outdoor—with permanent lines, portable nets, restrooms, water, and lights.

Virginia is along the Mesabi Trail, a paved multi-use trail that extends more than 135 miles across the Iron Range.

== Education ==
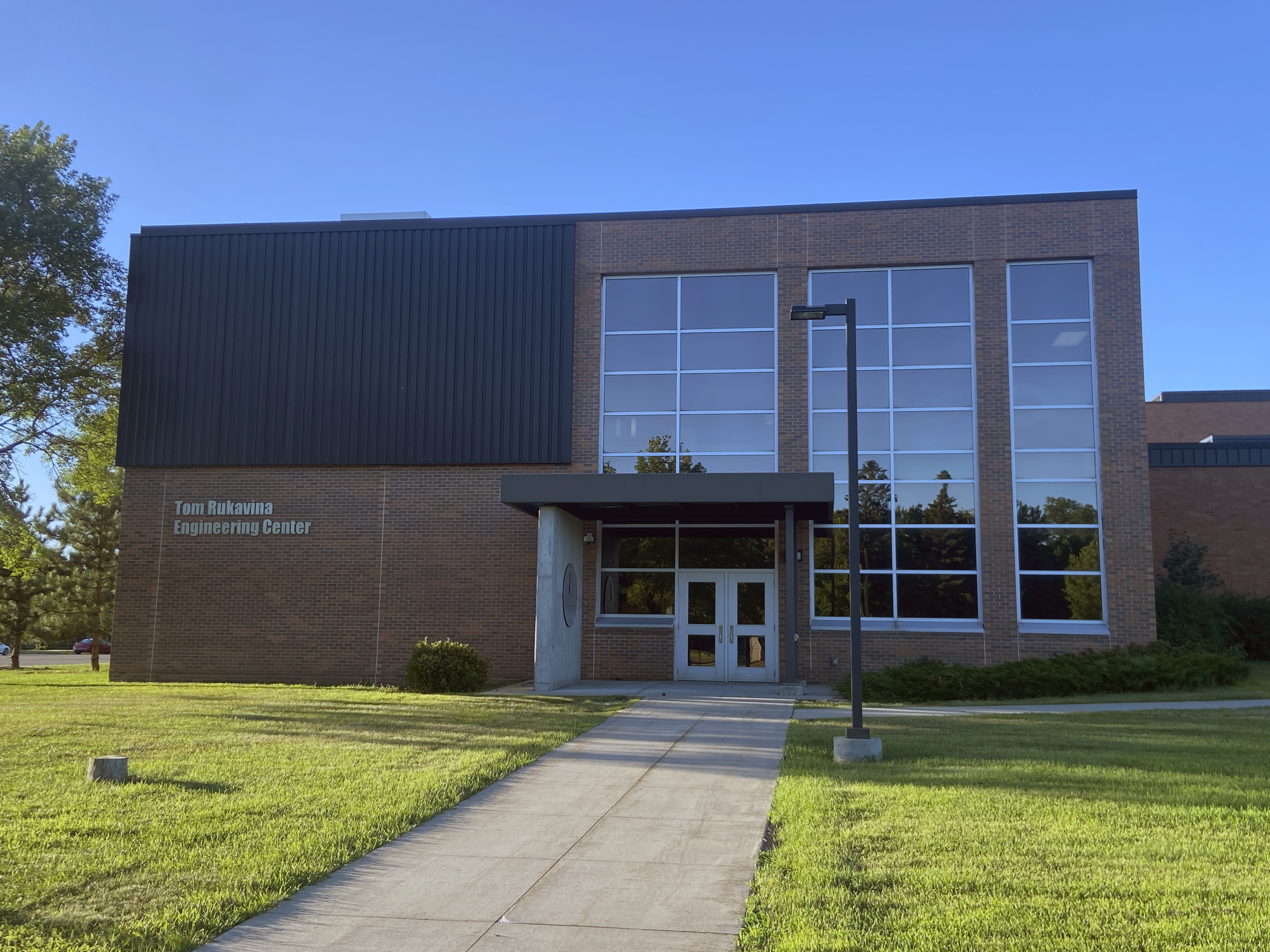
Tom Rukavina Engineering Center, Minnesota North College

Rock Ridge Public Schools (ISD 2909) serves the city with Rock Ridge High School (grades 7–12), North Star Elementary (grades 3–6), and Parkview Learning Center (Pre-K–2).

Virginia is also the site of the Iron Range Engineering program, an ABET-accredited bachelor's degree in Integrated Engineering offered through Minnesota North College and Minnesota State University, Mankato. The program, based at Mesabi Range–Virginia, uses a cooperative education model with industry internships during the junior and senior years.

The Independent School District 2142 (ISD 2142) office is in Virginia, though its schools serve surrounding towns such as Cherry and Tower–Soudan.

Marquette Catholic School, affiliated with the Diocese of Duluth, offers private elementary education (K–6).

The Virginia campus of Mesabi Range, part of Minnesota North College, provides two-year technical, career, and transfer programs.

The Virginia Public Library offers media, resources, and programs for all ages.

The Northland Learning Center, housed in the former James Madison Elementary School, serves students requiring alternative education under ISD 2909.

== Media ==
News media

- The Mesabi Tribune, newspaper published in Virginia and Hibbing

Television

Stations serving Virginia are received from the Duluth television market:

- 3 KDLH – CBS
- 6 / 11 KBJR – NBC
- 8 / 31 WDSE – PBS
- 10 / 13 WDIO – ABC
- 21 KQDS – Fox

== Infrastructure ==
Transportation

Virginia is a regional transportation hub within the Mesabi Range. Major roadways include U.S. routes 53 and 169 (northern terminus) and State Highway 135 (MN 135). Other main routes include 2nd Avenue West, 9th Avenue West, 12th Avenue West, 13th Street South, 8th Street South, and 9th Street North. Downtown Virginia is centered along Chestnut Street. Arrowhead Transportation also allows for city bussing through the Virginia Metro area.

In 2017, the U.S. 53 Bridge was built. It is Minnesota's tallest bridge and the main bridge from the freeway from southern Minnesota to the north. In 2021, it was renamed the Thomas Rukavina Memorial Bridge.

== Notable people ==
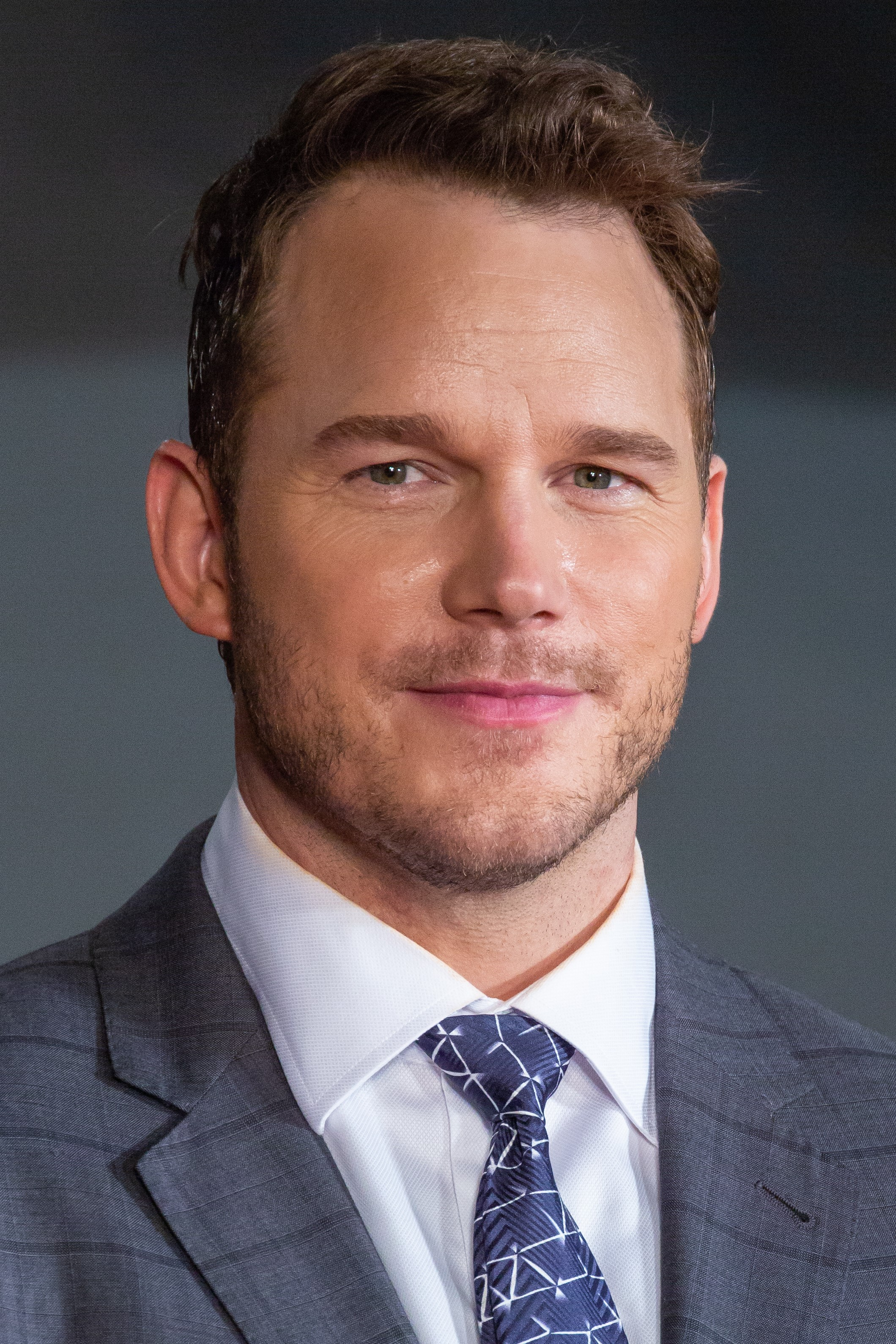
Actor Chris Pratt was born in Virginia, Minnesota.

- W. T. Bailey, lumber industrialist
- Daniel Berrigan, peace activist
- Luke F. Burns, lawyer and Minnesota state legislator
- Jack Carlson, professional hockey player
- Jeff Carlson, professional hockey player
- Steve Carlson, professional hockey player
- Mark Cullen, professional hockey player
- Matt Cullen, professional hockey player
- Peter X. Fugina, educator and Minnesota state legislator
- John Gruden, professional hockey player
- Frank Haege, professional and collegiate football coach
- John Harrington, hockey player, member of the 1980 Miracle on Ice team that won the Olympic gold medal
- Edwin H. Hoff, Minnesota state legislator
- Craig Hella Johnson, composer
- Kurt Johnson, auto racer
- Warren Johnson, auto racer, member of Motorsports Hall of Fame of America
- Vic Kulbitski, football player
- Pete LoPresti, professional hockey player
- Robert W. Mattson, Sr., Minnesota attorney general
- Robert Mondavi, winemaker
- Matt Niskanen, professional hockey player
- Johnny Norlander, professional basketball player
- Tim Paulson, California Labor Leader
- Chris Pratt, actor
- Alex Rozier, journalist
- Tom Rukavina, Minnesota state legislator
- Sherman Walt, bassoonist
- Leonard C. Ward, United States Army Brigadier General
- Thomas D. Yukelich, Minnesota state legislator
