= Olcott Park =

City park in Virginia, Minnesota, United States

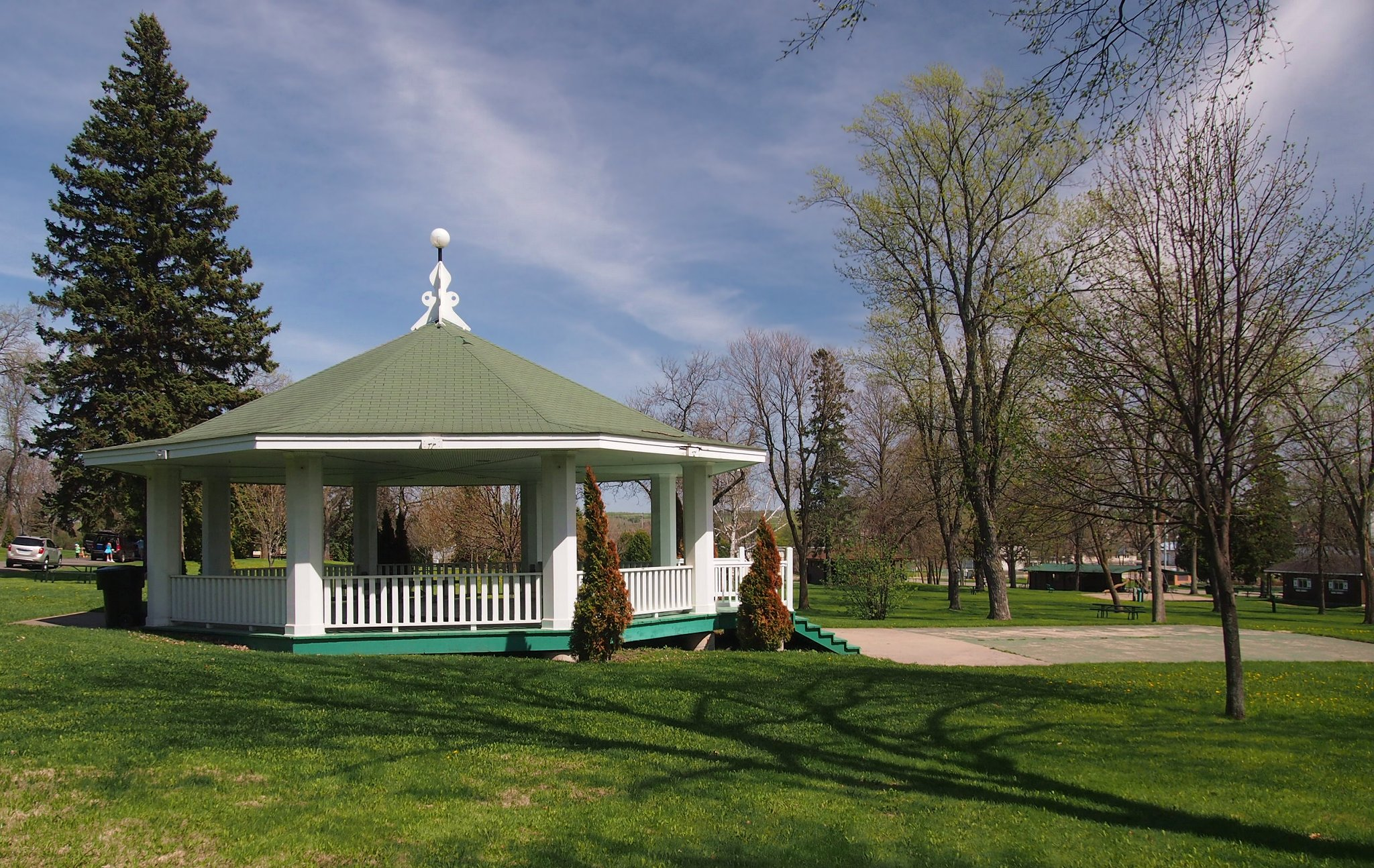
- A gazebo at the center of Olcott Park
- Interactive map of Olcott Park
- Type: City park
- Location: Virginia, Minnesota, United States
- Coordinates: 47°31′45″N 92°33′00″W
- Area: 40 acres (16 ha)
- Website: Official website

Olcott Park is a city park in Virginia, Minnesota, United States.

== History ==
Olcott Park was named after William J. Olcott, an officer of the Oliver Iron Mining Company. In 1905 the company first leased the land to the city for $1 a year if the city would pay taxes on it. The city purchased the land in 1939 for $9,015.

== Description ==
The Olcott Park in Virginia, Minnesota is a 40-acre (16 ha) amount of land on the north side of town. It is bordered by 9th St. N and Essentia Health/Virginia Regional Medical Center on the north and the Calvary Cemetery on the west. On the east it is bordered by N 9th Ave W, and a city museum (Heritage Museum). On the south, the park is bordered by Parkview Learning Center and some little-league baseball fields.

Along with a large playground area, the park also boasts a bandstand in its center where Virginia City Band performances take place in the summer. In the northern region of the park, a fountain still stands today that was built during the Great Depression and renovated in 2019. Also, a structure in the southern edge of the park still stands that held monkeys and bear cubs prior to World War II.

== Olcott Park Greenhouse ==
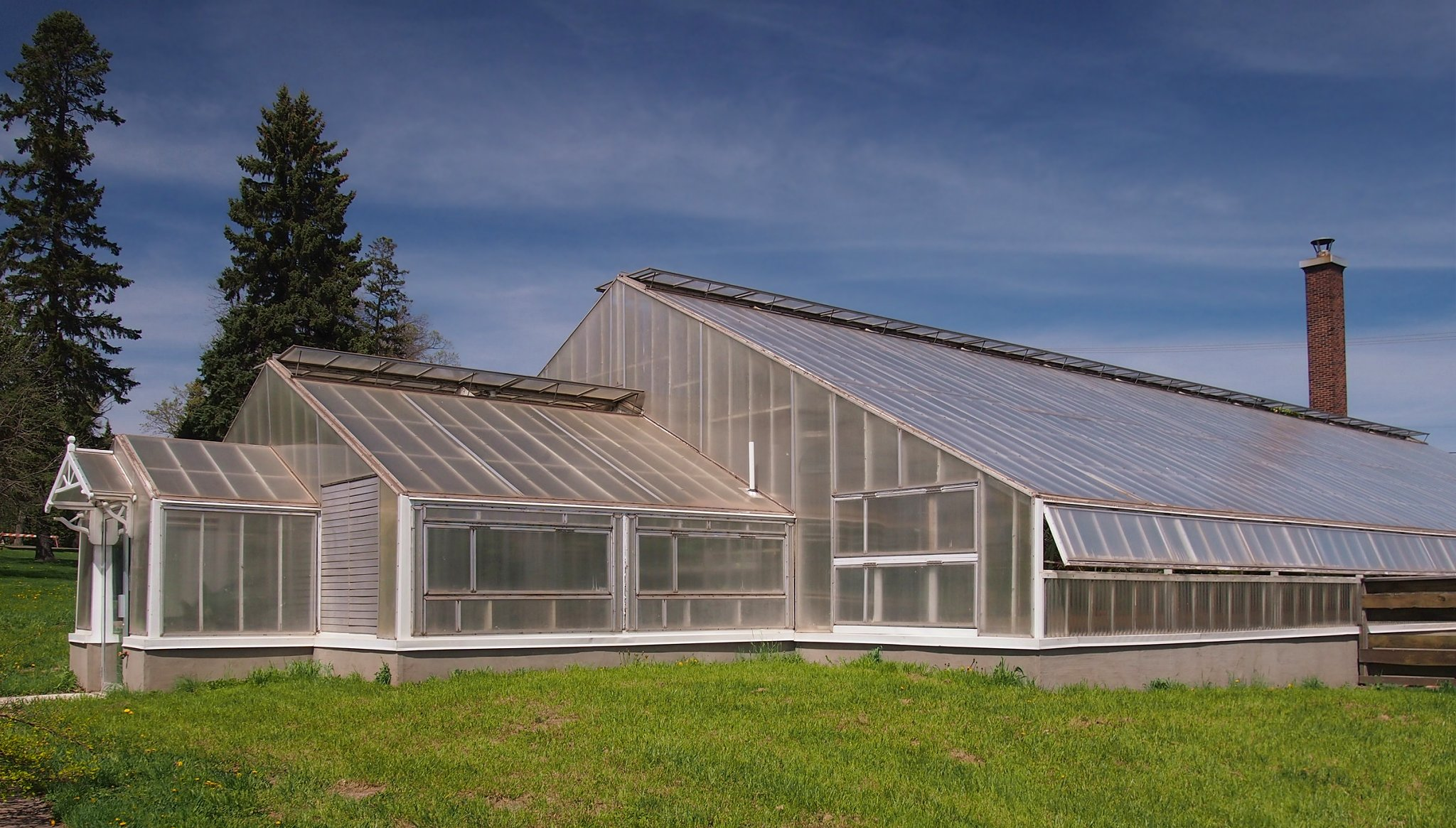
The Olcott Park Greenhouse

The Olcott Park Greenhouse is a 4,500-square-foot (420 m^{2}), city-operated greenhouse located in the Olcott Park at N. 9th Avenue W. and 7th Street N. in Virginia, Minnesota, United States. It is open to the public year-round without charge.

This three-room greenhouse dates from the 1930s. Its central room contains a good collection of exotic plants, ranging in size from small specimens to mature Ponderosa lemon trees bearing fruit, with cacti and succulents, large agave, palm, and ficus specimens. Historically it was the site for huge begonia shows which attracted thousands of visitors. The north and south greenhouses were used to raise bedding plants for flower beds throughout the city.

== See also ==
- List of botanical gardens in the United States
