= Delvic Building =

Commercial building in Hibbing, Minnesota

- U.S. National Register of Historic Places
- U.S. Historic district – Contributing property
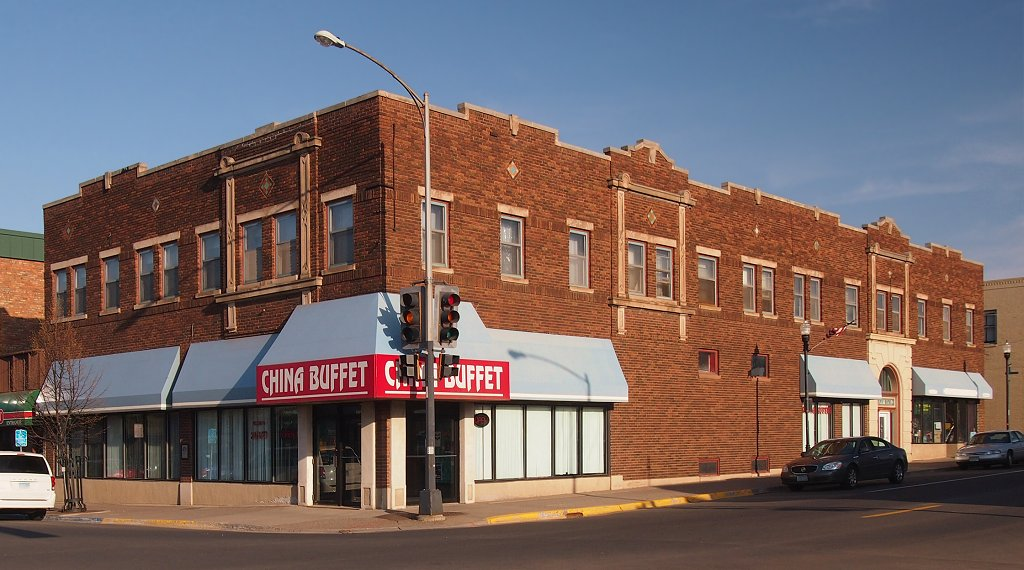
- The Delvic Building viewed from the northwest

- Location within Minnesota Location within the United States
- Location: 102 E. Howard Street, Hibbing, Minnesota
- Coordinates: 47°25′38″N 92°56′30″W
- Area: Less than one acre
- Built: 1922
- Part of: East Howard Street Commercial Historic District (ID93000255)
- NRHP reference No.: 80004350

Significant dates
- Added to NRHP: July 17, 1980
- Designated CP: April 1, 1993

The Delvic Building is a historic commercial building in Hibbing, Minnesota, United States. It was constructed in 1922 when Hibbing was a company town for a subsidiary of U.S. Steel, which took the unusual step of designing the commercial as well as residential sectors. In previous company towns, such as Coleraine, Minnesota, or Gary, Indiana, the controlling industry focused on employee housing and left commercial development to private entrepreneurs. The Delvic Building was listed on the National Register of Historic Places for its local significance in the themes of commerce, community planning and development, and industry. It was nominated for exemplifying the type of building constructed in Hibbing's planned downtown, and for attesting to this evolution in corporate control of community development.

When the East Howard Street Commercial Historic District was designated in 1993, the Delvic Building was listed as a contributing property.

== See also ==
- National Register of Historic Places listings in St. Louis County, Minnesota
