= East Howard Street Commercial Historic District =

Historic district in Minnesota, United States

- U.S. National Register of Historic Places
- U.S. Historic district
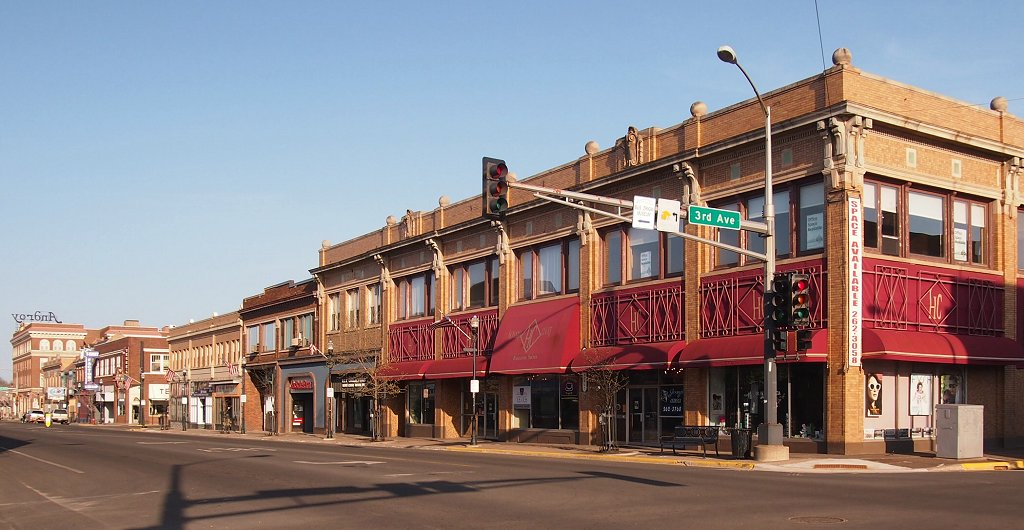
- East Howard Street from 3rd Avenue looking southeast

- Location within Minnesota Location within the United States
- Location: 101–510 E. Howard Street, Hibbing, Minnesota
- Coordinates: 47°25′39″N 92°56′21″W
- Area: 7 acres (2.8 ha)
- Built: 1919–1925
- Built by: C.F. Haglin & Sons
- Architect: Oliver Iron Mining Company
- Architectural style: Colonial Revival, Prairie School, Tudor Revival
- NRHP reference No.: 93000255
- Added to NRHP: April 1, 1993

The East Howard Street Commercial Historic District is a historic business district in Hibbing, Minnesota, United States. It comprises both sides of East Howard Street along the four blocks between 1st and 5th Avenues. It was the new business district designed and built for Hibbing by the Oliver Iron Mining Company from 1920 to 1921, when the company arranged to move the city a mile south to expand the Hull–Rust–Mahoning Open Pit Iron Mine. The district was listed on the National Register of Historic Places in 1993 for its local significance in the theme of community planning and development. It was nominated as a key portion of Hibbing that represents the efforts of the Oliver Iron Mining Company to relocate the entire town, and the economic importance of iron mining on the Mesabi Range.

The historic district consists of 34 contributing properties. Two, the Androy Hotel and the Delvic Building, are also listed individually on the National Register.

== See also ==
- National Register of Historic Places listings in St. Louis County, Minnesota
