= Fena =

Fena may refer to:

- FENA, the Federal News Agency of the Federation of Bosnia and Herzegovina
- Fractional sodium excretion (FE_{Na}), a medical parameter representing the fraction of sodium in urine relative to the fraction of sodium in circulation
- Fena Lake, the largest lake on the island of Guam
- Fena Gitu (born 1991), Kenyan rapper
- Jack Fena (1923-2010), American politician and judge
- Lori Fena (born 1961), American internet activist, entrepreneur, and author
- Fena: Pirate Princess, a TV series
