= Hill-Annex Mine State Park =

Former State park in Minnesota, United States

Hill Annex Mine State Park
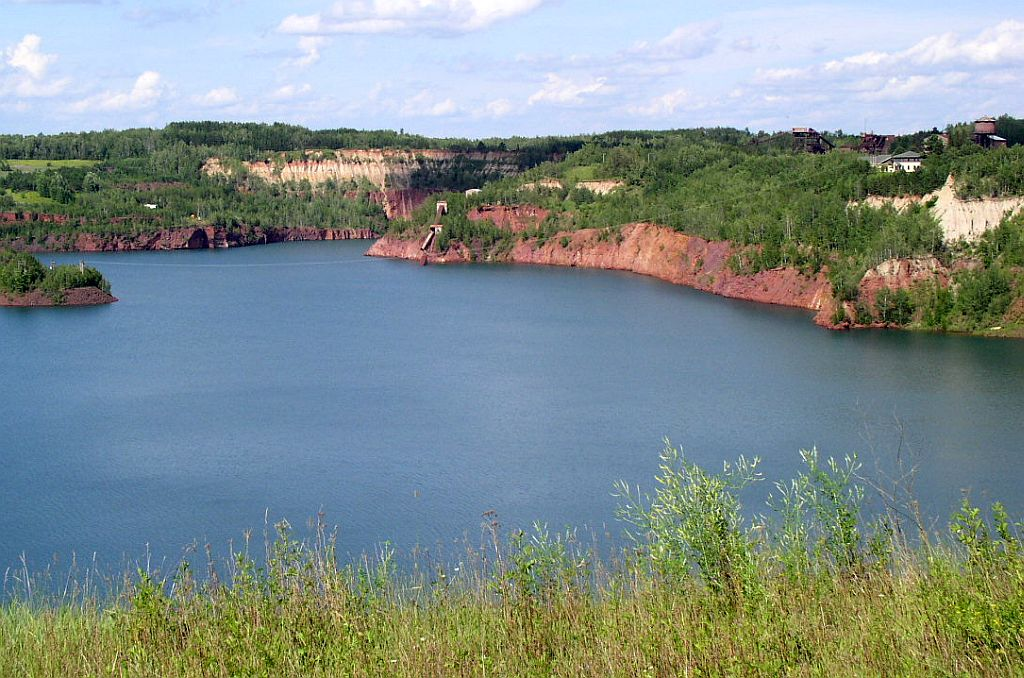
- Hill-Annex Mine

- Location within Minnesota Location within the United States
- Location: Itasca, Minnesota, United States
- Coordinates: 47°20′04″N 93°16′21″W
- Area: 625 acres (253 ha)
- Elevation: 1,434 ft (437 m)
- Established: 1988
- Governing body: Minnesota Department of Natural Resources
- Website: Hill Annex Mine State Park
- Hill Annex Mine
- U.S. National Register of Historic Places
- U.S. Historic district
- Built: 1912
- Architect: Jones & Laughlin Steel Co.
- Architectural style: Bungalow/Craftsman
- NRHP reference No.: 86002126
- Added to NRHP: August 1, 1986

Hill-Annex Mine State Park is a former state park of Minnesota, United States, interpreting the open-pit mining heritage of the Mesabi Range. The park was located north of the city of Calumet, in Itasca County, Minnesota. The park provided access to fossil material exposed by mining from the Cretaceous era Coleraine Formation.

In 1892, the land was leased for mineral exploration. It was leased again in 1900 and mining began in 1913. In the years it was in operation, the mine produced 63 million tons of iron ore. It grew to become the sixth largest producer in Minnesota. Historic buildings include the office building (c. 1930), laboratory (c. 1930), maintenance shop (c. 1930), truck repair shop (c. 1919), wooden water tower (c. 1919), and community club (c. 1915).

After the mine closed, the Iron Range Resources and Rehabilitation Board acquired it for a dollar. They converted the community club building into a museum and visitors center and gave tours. The former mine was listed on the National Register of Historic Places in 1986 as a historic district, and the Minnesota Legislature made Hill Annex Mine a state park two years later. Responsibility for the site was transferred to the Minnesota Department of Natural Resources (MNDNR) in 1991.

In June 2024, Hill-Annex Mine State Park was permanently closed, as economic situations had made mining at the site viable again. MNDNR noted that this change had been planned for quite some time, and that the park's closure was "consistent with the historical expectation that mining would return to this site". Preparations for re-opening may begin as early as late 2024, and mining operations could begin as soon as 2025. As of 2024, MNDNR is working with 'community partners' on the question of what to do with the various artifacts preserved at the park's museum building.

== Flora and fauna ==
Conservationists have added vegetation to rehabilitate areas damaged by open-pit mining. The landscape is home to grouse, deer, coyotes, timber wolves, and black bears. Raptors, including eagles, peregrine falcons, and hawks have returned to the park.

== Hill Annex Paleontology Project ==
The Hill Annex Paleontology Project is a research endeavor focused on the Cretaceous deposits found in Minnesota and has been active at the state park since 2014. It began as a volunteer-led study by the Science Museum of Minnesota. As of 2017, the project is now led by and housed at the Minnesota Discovery Center in Chisholm. This project focuses on the Coleraine Formation, a formation specifically found only in Minnesota.

Many specimens previously undocumented on the Mesabi Iron Range and Minnesota have been uncovered over the course of this project. One of the most scientifically important finds was the end piece of a toe bone from a dromaeosaur in 2015, which is only the second piece of dinosaur remains found in the state. These raptors were approximately five to six feet tall and lived during the Late Cretaceous Period.

Specimens found by this project also ammonites, crocodiles, and various species of fish, sharks, plant material, turtles, crabs, mollusks, snails, and clams.
