= Bob Dylan Childhood Home =

Childhood home of Bob Dylan

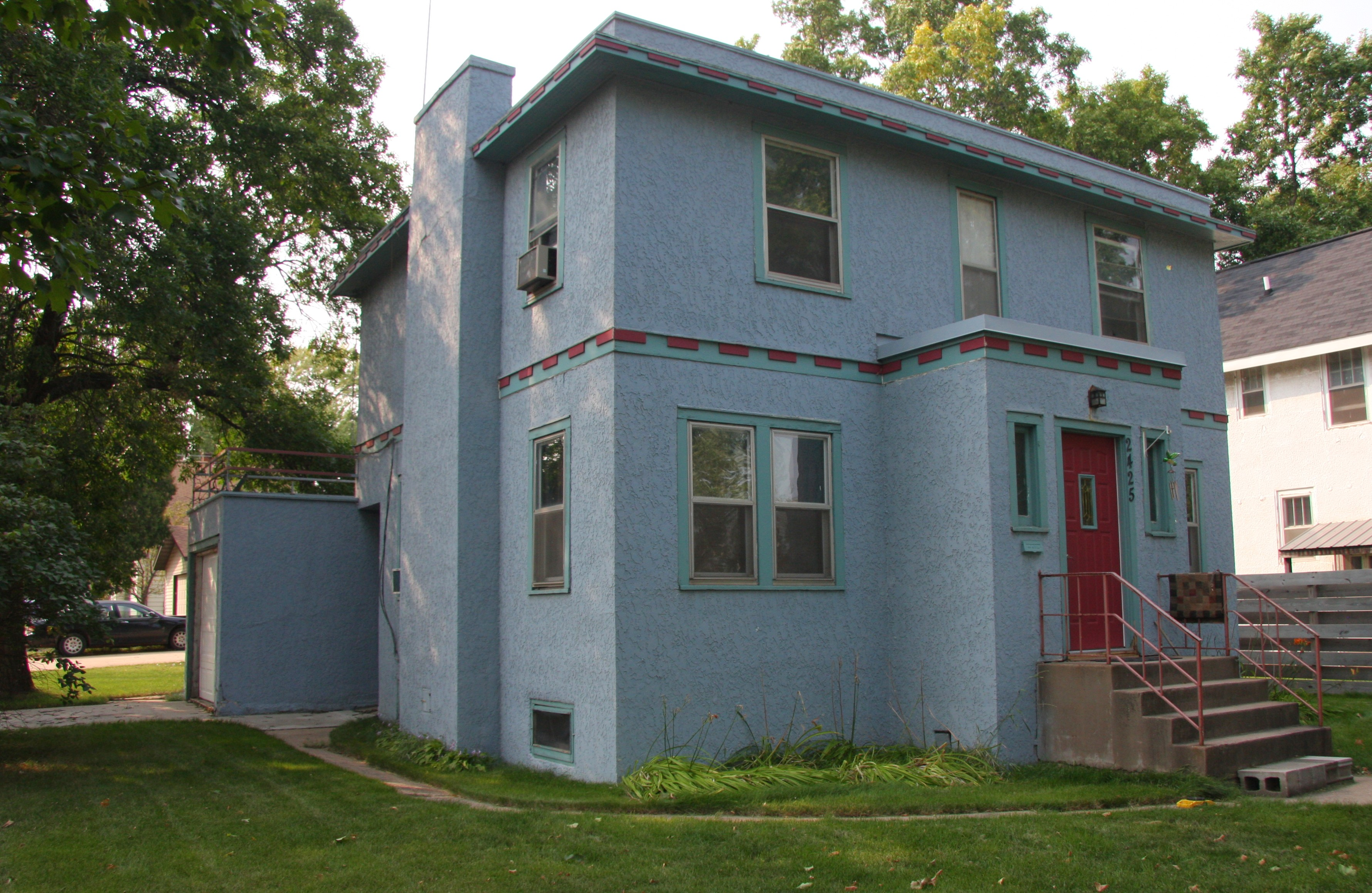
- Exterior of the house in 2015; it has since been repainted beige
- Interactive map of the Bob Dylan Childhood Home area

General information
- Type: Residential home
- Location: 2425 Seventh Avenue East, Hibbing, MN, United States
- Coordinates: 47°25′18″N 92°56′02″W
- Completed: 1939

Technical details
- Floor area: 1,446 square feet (134.3 m^{2})

The Bob Dylan Childhood House, also known as the Zimmerman Family Home, is a house at 2425 Seventh Avenue East in Hibbing, Minnesota notable for being the childhood home of American musician and Nobel laureate Bob Dylan (born Robert Zimmerman). The house is a private residence owned by Dylanologist and archivist Bill Pagel, though it is occasionally open for public tours.

== Description and history ==
=== General ===
The house was built in 1939 in the iron ore mining town of Hibbing, Minnesota. It is two stories tall and has three bedrooms. The exterior of the house is currently painted beige, the color it was when Dylan originally lived at the site. The house has two distinctive strips of siding that extend horizontally across the entire building with distinctive arts and crafts embellishments.

=== History ===
Bob Dylan's family moved to Hibbing in 1948, briefly staying with relatives before moving to the house on Seventh Avenue that same year. Dylan's father, Abraham Zimmerman, had contracted polio and moved the family from Dylan's birthplace of Duluth to Hibbing to be closer to family. Dylan's mother, Beatrice "Beatty" Stone, also had ties to the town; the town's cinema, the Lybba Theater, was named for her grandmother, the wife of a local showman. Dylan's first exposure to rock music and the Grand Ole Opry, both of which he would recall as formative experiences, were at the house. Dylan lived in the house when he first performed live in a 1957 talent show at Hibbing High School. In 1959, Dylan moved out of the house to attend the University of Minnesota in Minneapolis. The Zimmerman family lived in the house until 1967.

In 2019, archivist Bill Pagel purchased the home with the intentions of preserving the house and opening it to tours. Pagel also owns the house in Duluth, Minnesota where Dylan was born and lived until the move to Hibbing. Pagel has begun collecting Dylan materials and photographs for the site, and has given private tours of the house to such notable people as Timothée Chalamet, who portrayed Dylan in the film A Complete Unknown (2024).

In 2006, the Hibbing Public Library published the Bob Dylan Walking Tour, a map for a self-guided walking tour of downtown Hibbing where visitors could visit several Dylan-related sites. The house was included as one of the stops on the map.
