= Hull–Rust–Mahoning Open Pit Iron Mine =

Iron mine

- Hull-Rust-Mahoning Open Pit Iron Mine
- U.S. National Register of Historic Places
- U.S. National Historic Landmark
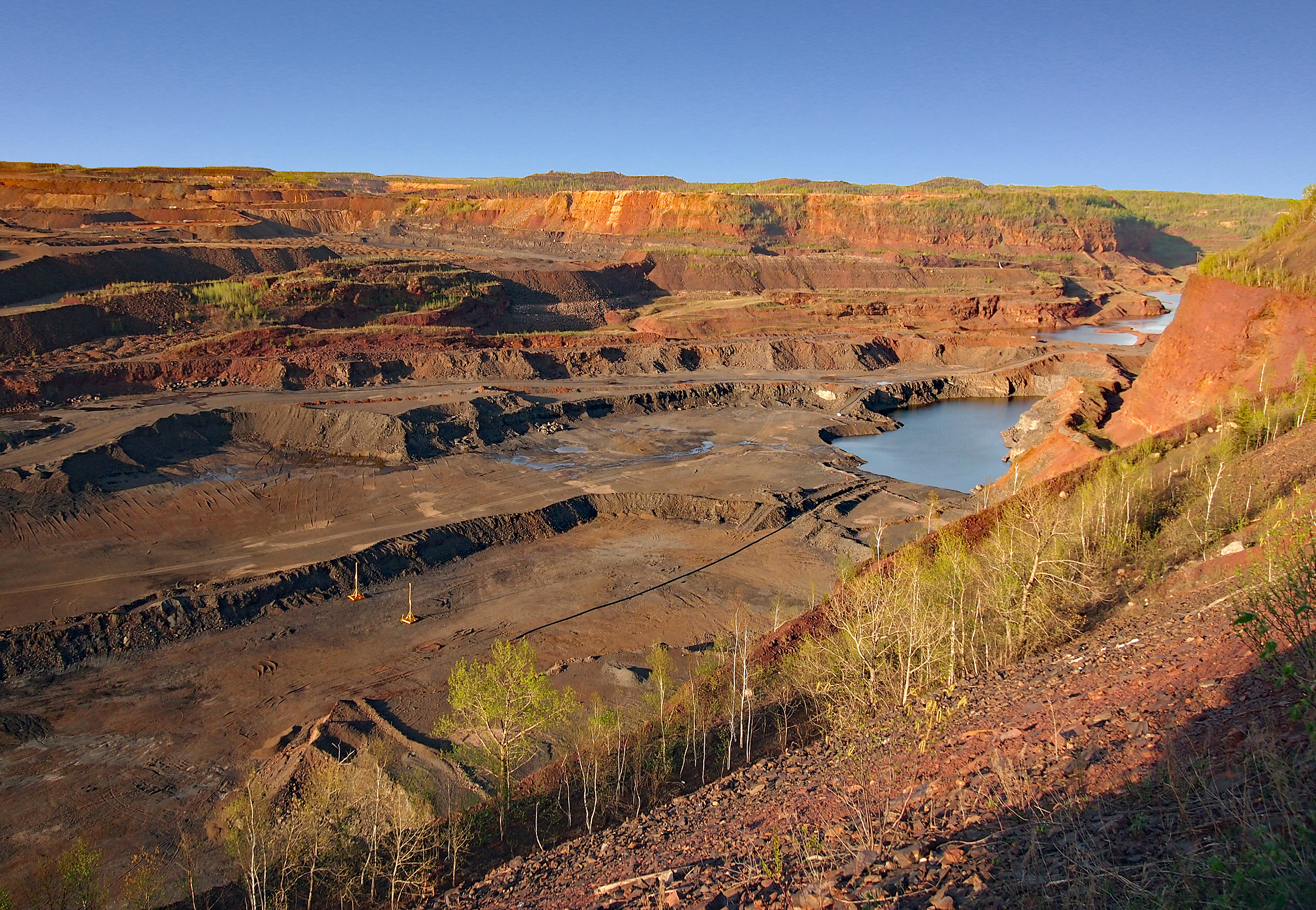
- The Hull–Rust–Mahoning Mine from an overlook

- Location within Minnesota Location within the United States
- Location: off 3rd Avenue E., Hibbing, Minnesota
- Coordinates: 47°27′30″N 92°57′0″W
- Built: 1895–present
- NRHP reference No.: 66000904

Significant dates
- Added to NRHP: November 13, 1966
- Designated NHL: November 13, 1966

The Hull–Rust–Mahoning Open Pit Iron Mine in Hibbing, Minnesota, United States, is the largest operating open-pit iron mine in Minnesota. The pit stretches more than three miles (5 km) long, two miles (3 km) wide, and 535 feet (163 m) deep. It was established in 1895 and was one of the world's first mechanized open-pit mines.

The mine, located in the Mesabi Range, supplied as much as one-fourth of all the iron ore mined in the United States during its peak production from World War I through World War II. This output made Minnesota the nation's largest iron ore producer and the U.S. the world's largest steel manufacturer.

The Hull–Rust–Mahoning Mine was named a National Historic Landmark in 1966. The city of Hibbing has long maintained a public overlook and visitor center on the rim of the mine, attracting tens of thousands of tourists each year. In 2019, the overlook was to be moved as mining operations expanded.

== History ==
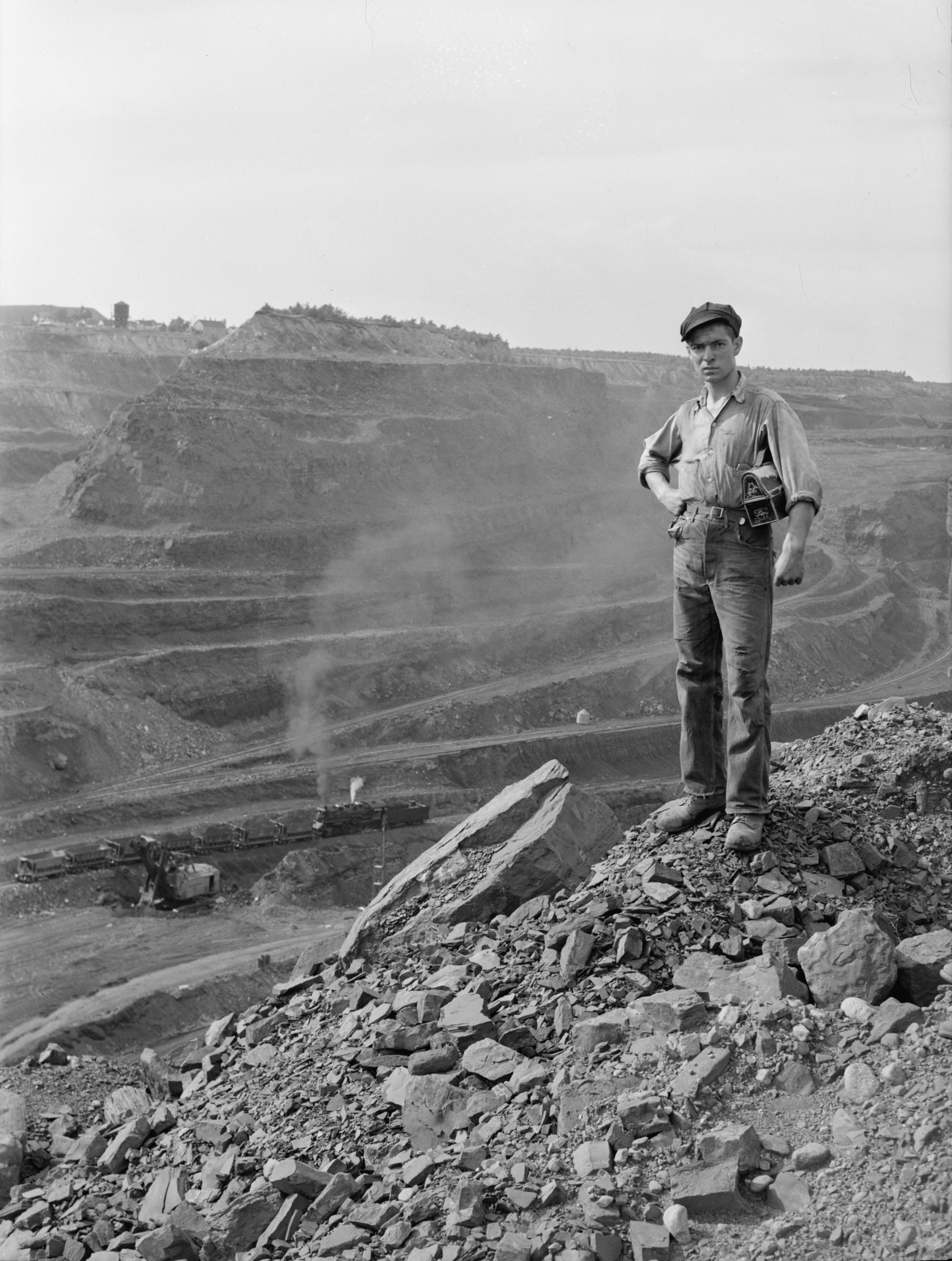
A miner posing near the edge of the pit in 1941

The first mine on the Mesabi Range was the Mountain Iron Mine, discovered in 1890. Iron ore was discovered near present-day Hibbing in early 1892. The Lake Superior Consolidated Iron Mines developed the underground Burt Mine (William Olcott, manager) and The Sellers Ore Co (C.H. Munger) the underground Sellers Mine. William C. Agnew directed stripping and development of the open-pit Mahoning Mine for the Mahoning Ore Company.

All three mines began shipping in 1895, and with development of the Hull and Rust Mines soon merged into one large mine. The consolidation of the mines was led by the formation of U.S. Steel in 1901, the world's largest corporation at the time. The mine's sheer size led to many technological innovations as the open-pit method—pioneered at the nearby Biwabik Mine—was developed, such as the adoption of steam shovels.

The town of Hibbing, founded in 1893 on word of the rich iron deposits, prospered considerably as the mine grew. By 1910, though, the northern end of the community was surrounded by the mine on three sides, and it was well known that the ore continued under the town. In 1916 the Oliver Mining Company, operator of the mine, declared that the northern part of Hibbing, which contained many of its homes and businesses, had to be moved. The town government agreed and in 1918 they accepted a proposal from the company to build a new downtown for Hibbing two miles (3 km) to the south.

A total of 188 buildings ranging in size from small family homes to the large Colonial Hotel were moved by Hibbing's residents using horses, farm tractors, and a steam crawler provided by the mining company. To move all of the buildings, they gradually placed logs underneath the structures and secured them with steel cables. They then rolled the buildings to their new location on specially constructed wooden rails. If the building was too large, they cut it into two or three pieces and moved each separately. If it was too tall, they removed the chimney or had a worker stand on the roof with a long stick to lift up electrical lines as it passed underneath.

The Oliver Mining Company also funded the construction of new buildings and services in the new townsite, such as the Androy Hotel, Hibbing City Hall, and Hibbing High School, sewage, and electric lines.

While the moving of Hibbing succeeded in dramatically shifting the focal point of the town, houses and other buildings remained close to what became known as North Hibbing. In 1935, the mining company decided that they needed to mine that land as well. At that point, they did not attempt to move the remaining houses. Instead, they tore them down, paying their owners just a fraction of their value.

Since ore shipments began in 1895, over 1.4 billion tons of waste material and 800 million tons of iron ore have been removed from the 2,000-acre (800 ha) mine site.

The mine was listed as a National Historic Landmark and added to the National Register of Historic Places on November 13, 1966. It was listed for its national significance in the themes of commerce and industry.

== Present operation ==
Since 1976, the mine has been operated by Hibbing Taconite Company (HibTac for short). Iron-bearing taconite pellets are produced at the rate of 8.2 million tons annually (not counting tailings, waste rock, or overburden). Hibbing Taconite was initially managed by Pickands Mather on behalf of owners Bethlehem Steel and Stelco. ArcelorMittal assumed the role of a managing partner in August 2019. On September 28, 2020, ArcelorMittal sold its U.S. business to Cleveland-Cliffs Inc. for about $1.4 billion. As of 2021 the company is managed by Cleveland-Cliffs, with ownership divided between Cleveland-Cliffs (85.3%), and U.S. Steel (14.7%).

== Hull Rust Mine View Visitor Center ==
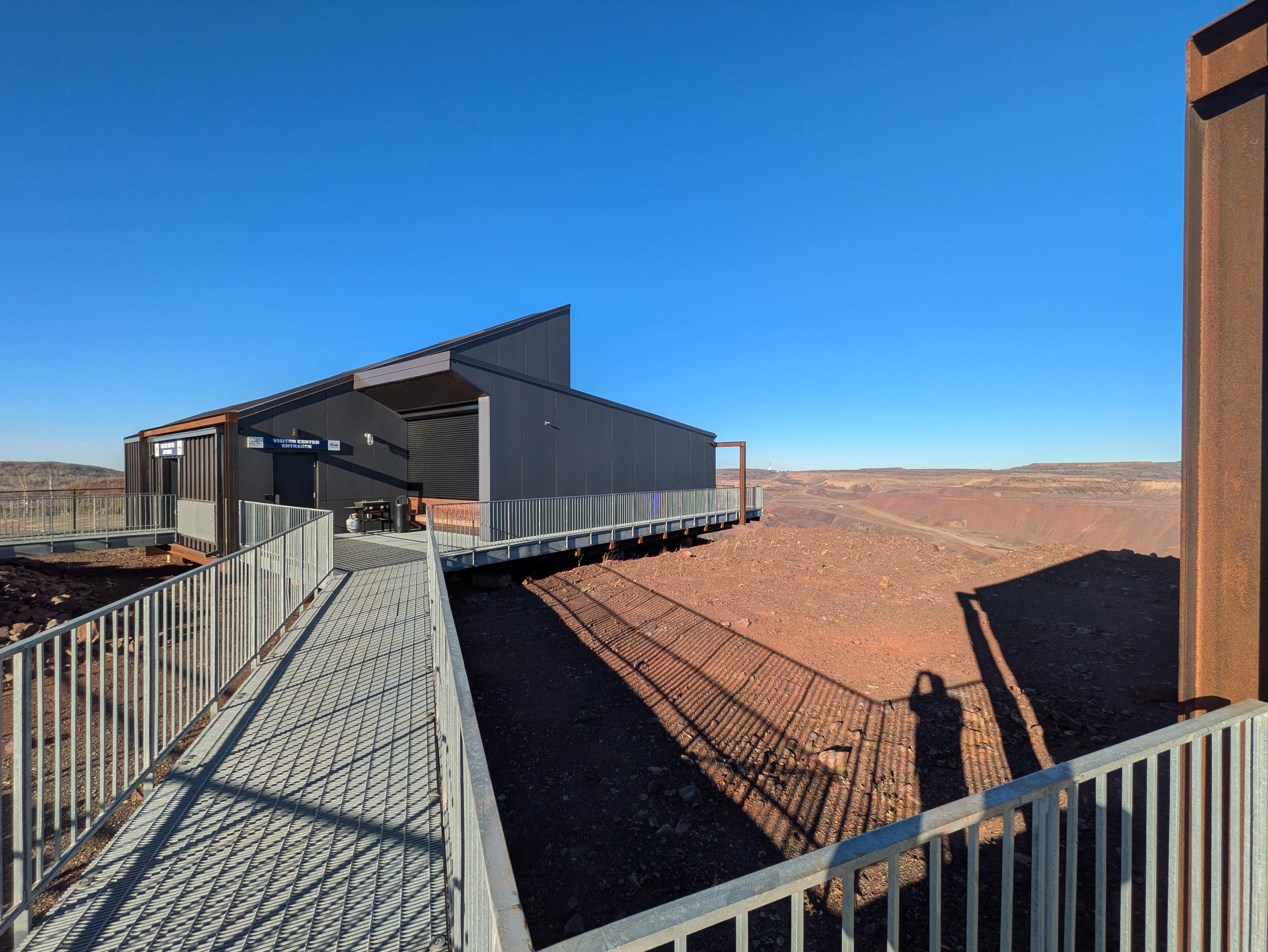
Hull Rust Mine View Visitor Center

The Hull Rust Mine View Visitor Center overlooks the Hull–Rust–Mahoning Mine and tells the story of iron mining on the Mesabi Range. The original Mineview closed because the land under it had to be mined. The site was relocated and later reopened in a new location in 2017. In 2025, two new permanent buildings were finished at the site, replacing the temporary structure that had been there. It includes exhibits, maps, and displays about mining methods and the role of iron ore in industry. Visitors can view active mining from a designated area and learn about the equipment used in the mine.

== See also ==
- List of National Historic Landmarks in Minnesota
- National Register of Historic Places listings in St. Louis County, Minnesota
