= Little Swan, Hibbing, Minnesota =

Human settlement in Minnesota, US

Coordinates: 47°17′50″N 92°49′52″W

Little Swan is a neighborhood of the city of Hibbing in St. Louis County, Minnesota, United States. Previously, Little Swan was its own unincorporated community before it was annexed by the city of Hibbing. Little Swan is located at the East Swan River, near County Highway 5.
