= Rufus Wilber Hitchcock =

American newspaper publisher, educator, and politician

Rufus Wilber Hitchcock (July 27, 1868 – February 27, 1961) was an American newspaper publisher, educator, and politician.

Hitchcock was born in Mount Clemens, Michigan and moved to Minnesota in 1902 with his wife and family and settled in Hibbing, Minnesota. He was the publisher of the Hibbing Daily Tribune, the Crookston Daily News, and the Bemidji Daily Pioneer newspapers. He served as the superintendent of schools of Crookston, Minnesota and as principal of the Fosston, Minnesota schools. Hitchcock served in the Minnesota House of Representatives from 1919 to 1924.
