= John J. Spanish =

American politician

John James Spanish (June 1, 1922 – December 12, 2011) was an American politician, mechanic, and miner.

== Biography ==
Spanish was born in Hibbing, Minnesota and graduated from Hibbing High School. He also took University of Minnesota vocational extension classes. Spanish served in the United States Navy during World War II. Spanish worked as a mechanic, machinists, and in the iron ore mine. He served on the Hibbing Village Council and was a Democrat. Spanish served in the Minnesota House of Representatives in 1969 and 1970 and from 1973 to 1978. In 2004, he ran for election to the Minnesota House of Representatives on the Independence Party of Minnesota ticket and lost the election. Spanish died at the St. Raphael's Rehabilitation Center in Eveleth, Minnesota.
