= Carl Mario D'Aquila =

American politician (1924–2005)

Carl Mario D'Aquila (August 1, 1924 – September 9, 2005) was an American politician. journalist, and advertising agent.

D'Aquila was born in Hibbing, Minnesota and graduated from Hibbing High School in 1946. He went to Hibbing Community College and to Marquette University. D'Aquila served as an overseas civilian expediter for the United States Air Force during World War II. He was involved with the advertising and newspaper businesses and was a radio commenter. D'Aquila served in the Minnesota House of Representatives from 1947 to 1950. In 1962, D'Aquila lost the Republican nomination for the office of Lieutenant Governor of Minnesota. He served on the Minnesota Metropolitan Airports Commission from 1996 to 2004. D'Aquila died from adrenal cancer at his home in Saint Paul, Minnesota. The funeral and burial was in Hibbing, Minnesota.

Minnesota House of Representatives
Preceded by Elmer Peter Peterson	Member of the Minnesota House of Representatives from the 50th district January 6, 1947–December 31, 1950	Succeeded by Paul B. Widstrand
