= Bernard J. Bischoff =

American politician and judge

Bernard J. "Barney" Bischoff (January 27, 1931 – July 5, 1980) was an American politician and judge.

== Biography ==
Bischoff was born in Hibbing, Minnesota and graduated from Hibbing High School. He served in the United States Army from 1954 to 1956. He went to Hibbing Community College. Bischoff received his bachelor's degree in chemical engineering from Iowa State University and his law degree from University of Minnesota Law School. He practiced law in Hibbing, Minnesota. Bischoff served in the Minnesota House of Representatives in 1969 and 1970 and was a Democrat. His election was contested with Jack Fena and the Minnesota House of Representatives declared he was not legally elected on February 7, 1969. However, he was elected in a special election and took office on March 20, 1969. In 1970, he ran for the Minnesota Senate and lost the election. From 1972 to 1978, Bischoff served as Hibbing Municipal Court judge. He and his wife Grace Erickson Bischoff had 10 children. Bischoff died at Hibbing General Hospital in Hibbing, Minnesota from a swimming accident.
