= Leetonia, Hibbing, Minnesota =

Neighborhood of Hibbing, Minnesota, United States of America

Coordinates: 47°25′45″N 92°59′07″W

Leetonia is a neighborhood of the city of Hibbing in St. Louis County, Minnesota, United States. Previously, Leetonia was its own unincorporated community before it was annexed by the city of Hibbing. County Road 63 serves as a main arterial route in the community.

In the early 1900s, the community consisted mainly of immigrant mine workers associated with the Leetonia Mine.

Historical population
Census	Pop.	Note	%±
1940	396		—
U.S. Decennial Census
