= Androy Hotel =

Historic hotel building in Hibbing, Minnesota

- U.S. National Register of Historic Places
- U.S. Historic district – Contributing property
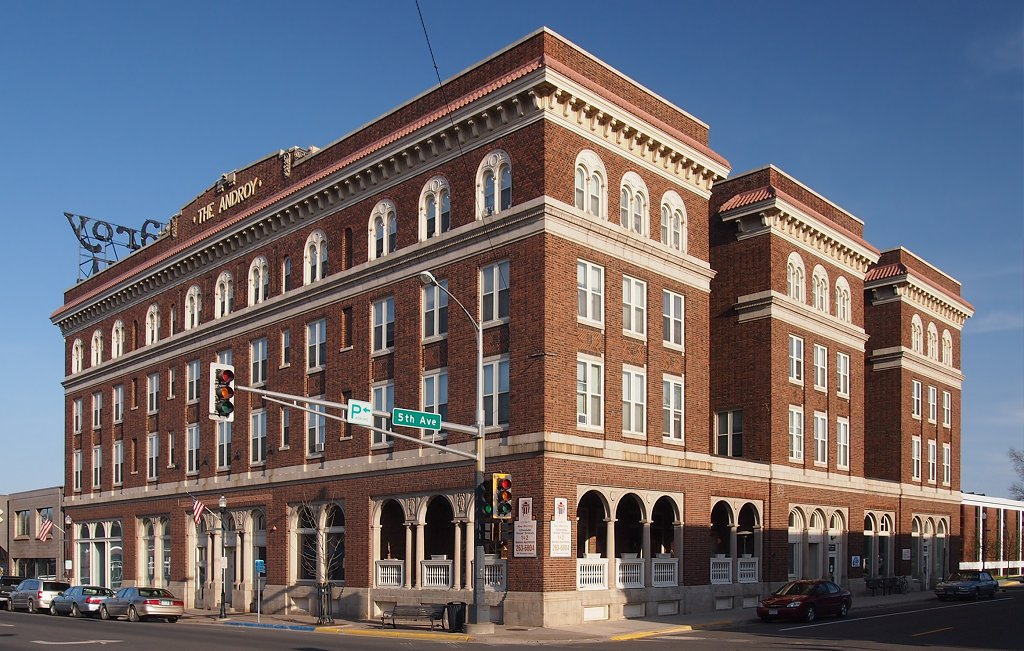
- The Androy Hotel viewed from the northwest

- Location within Minnesota Location within the United States
- Location: 592 E. Howard Street, Hibbing, Minnesota
- Coordinates: 47°25′38″N 92°56′10″W
- Area: Less than one acre
- Built: 1921
- Built by: Charles F. Haglin & Sons
- Architect: Spencer S. Rumsey
- Architectural style: Renaissance Revival
- Part of: East Howard Street Commercial Historic District (ID93000255)
- NRHP reference No.: 86001290

Significant dates
- Added to NRHP: June 13, 1986
- Designated CP: April 1, 1993

The Androy Hotel is a former hotel building in Hibbing, Minnesota, United States. It was built in 1921 by the Oliver Iron Mining Company to anchor the city's new business district, which was being relocated so the Hull–Rust–Mahoning Open Pit Iron Mine could expand. The Androy Hotel was listed on the National Register of Historic Places in 1986 for its local significance in the themes of architecture and industry. It was nominated for being a good example of a large, Renaissance Revival hotel built to serve a growing mining community. When the East Howard Street Commercial Historic District was designated in 1993, the Androy Hotel was listed as a contributing property.

The hotel closed in 1977. In 1994 it underwent adaptive reuse to become a mixed-use commercial and residential property.

== Origin ==
Hibbing was established as a company town in the 1890s next to a rich vein of iron ore. From early on it was known that the ore continued under the town, and in 1919 the Oliver Iron Mining Company began the process of moving the city a mile to the south. The company relocated 185 houses and 20 commercial buildings, and funded the construction of new buildings along East Howard Street to resell or lease.

The Androy's design is credited to Spencer S. Rumsey, the Oliver Iron Mining Company's chief engineer from 1917 to 1927. It was built to be an anchor of the new business district, with refined Renaissance Revival style and an imposing mass rising twice as high as most of the other nearby buildings.

== Description ==
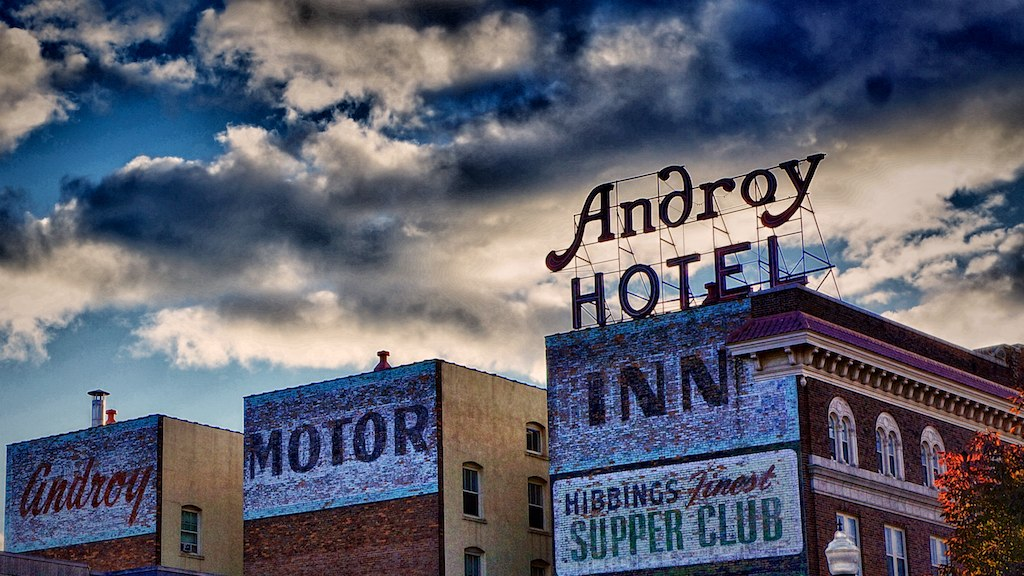
Rear of the Androy Hotel showing its three projecting halls

The Androy Hotel is a four-story brick building with Indiana Limestone trim. It has a flat façade facing East Howard Street to the north, but the east and west sides have three projecting masses giving it the footprint of two back-to-back capital "E"s. The hotel featured 142 guest rooms, a public dining room, three private dining rooms, reception rooms, sample rooms for traveling salesmen to display their products, and commercial and office space for lease. The Hibbing Chamber of Commerce and local Red Cross were early tenants.

== History ==
The Quigley–Doran Hotel Company assumed management of the Androy, the title coming from a portmanteau of the first names of officers Andrew Doran and Roy Quigley. The grand opening was held on June 30, 1921. The Androy was a key amenity in Hibbing, not only housing out-of-town visitors but hosting much of the city's commercial, political, and social activity for half a century. Declines in the iron ore industry depressed the local economy later in the 20th century, and the Androy Hotel went bankrupt and closed on November 30, 1977.

The Androy stood vacant for 14 years, prompting the city to issue a permit for its demolition. Residents of Hibbing lobbied to save the historic building. Their efforts secured a restoration project beginning in 1994 in which Brighton Development Corporation updated the 73-year-old building into a mixed-use facility of commercial space and senior apartments.

== See also ==
- National Register of Historic Places listings in St. Louis County, Minnesota
