= Redore, Hibbing, Minnesota =

Redore
- Neighborhood
- Location within Minnesota Location within the United States
- Coordinates: 47°26′37″N 92°53′57″W
- Country: United States
- State: Minnesota
- County: St. Louis
- Elevation: 1,473 ft (449 m)
- Time zone: UTC-6 (Central (CST))
  - Summer (DST): UTC-5 (CDT)
- Area code: 218
- GNIS feature ID: 662262

Redore is a neighborhood located within the city of Hibbing in St. Louis County, Minnesota, United States. It was an independent unincorporated community until its annexation into Hibbing in 1979.

The community is located near the junction of Spudville Road and U.S. Hwy. 169 / Minn. Hwy. 73.
