= Coleraine Formation =

Geologic formation in Minnesota, United States

- Stratigraphic range: Cretaceous
- Type: Formation

Location
- Region: Minnesota
- Country: United States

The Coleraine Formation is a geologic formation in Minnesota. It preserves fossils dating back to the Cretaceous period.

== See also ==
- List of fossiliferous stratigraphic units in Minnesota
- Paleontology in Minnesota
- Hill-Annex Mine State Park
