= Rouchleau Mine =

Mine in St. Louis County, Minnesota, United States

Coordinates: 47.5115931°N 92.5221273°W

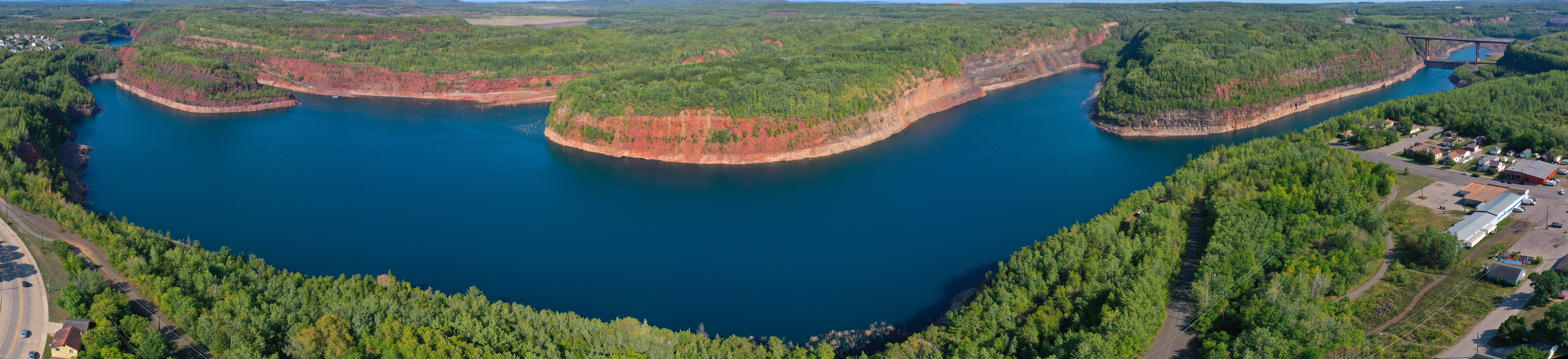
Panoramic view of the mine

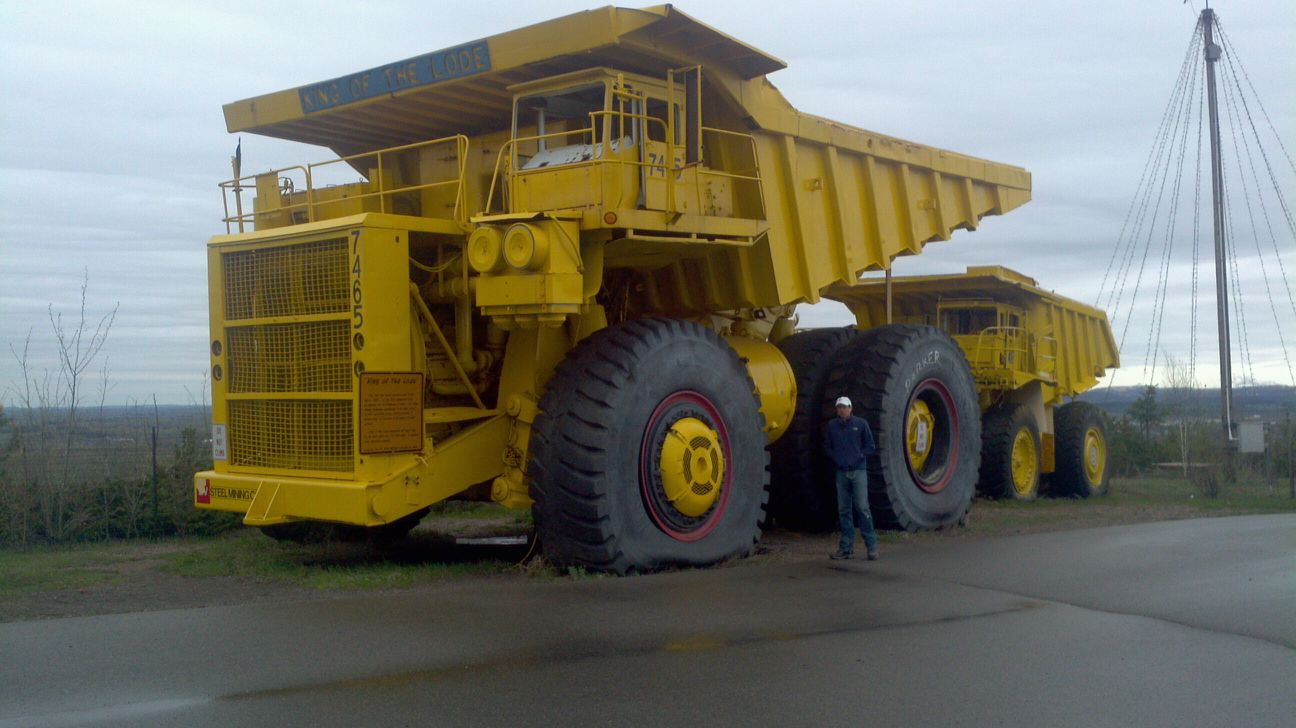
Mine trucks at the mine

The Rouchleau Mine is an abandoned open-pit mine within the Mesabi Iron Range at Virginia, Minnesota, United States. The mine, located on the east side of the city, is roughly 3 miles (4.8 km) long and .5 miles (0.80 km) wide; its deepest point is 450 feet (140 m) below its surface, making it one of the deepest mines in the range. Named for Louis Rouchleau, who explored the area for its mining potential, the mine was initially created as a shaft mine. It was converted to a pit mine by the 1930s due to improvements in open-pit mining technology and increasingly unstable terrain which made shaft mining unsafe.

Ten companies have overseen mining operations at the Rouchleau Mine since it began operating in 1893. The majority owner has always been either present owner U.S. Steel or one of the firm's predecessors. The mine has produced 300 million gross tons of iron ore since it opened; it was last mined in 1977.

Since its closure, the mine became part of Mineview in the Sky, a local tourist attraction. Mineview in the Sky featured a viewing platform overlooking both the Rouchleau Mine and an active United Taconite mine; it also included a 240-ton mining truck, a production truck, a railroad car, and a visitor center. The attraction closed in 2015 due to United Taconite's planned expansion of its mine into the land the mineview occupied. The mine expansion forced U.S. Route 53 to relocate; the Minnesota Department of Transportation built a bridge over the Rouchleau Mine to carry the highway. The Thomas Rukavina Memorial Bridge opened in September 2017. The mine pit serves as the source of drinking water for Virginia, Minnesota.

== See also ==
- Taconite
