= Mesabi Range =

Mining district in northeastern Minnesota

Coordinates: 47°30′N 93°4′W

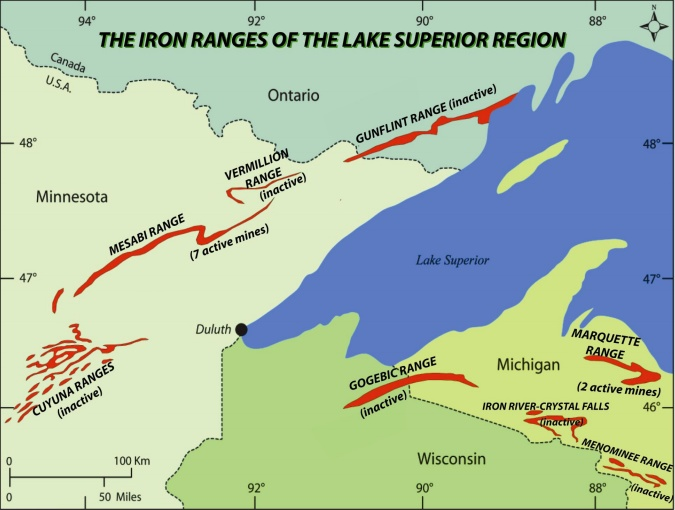
Lake Superior Iron Ranges

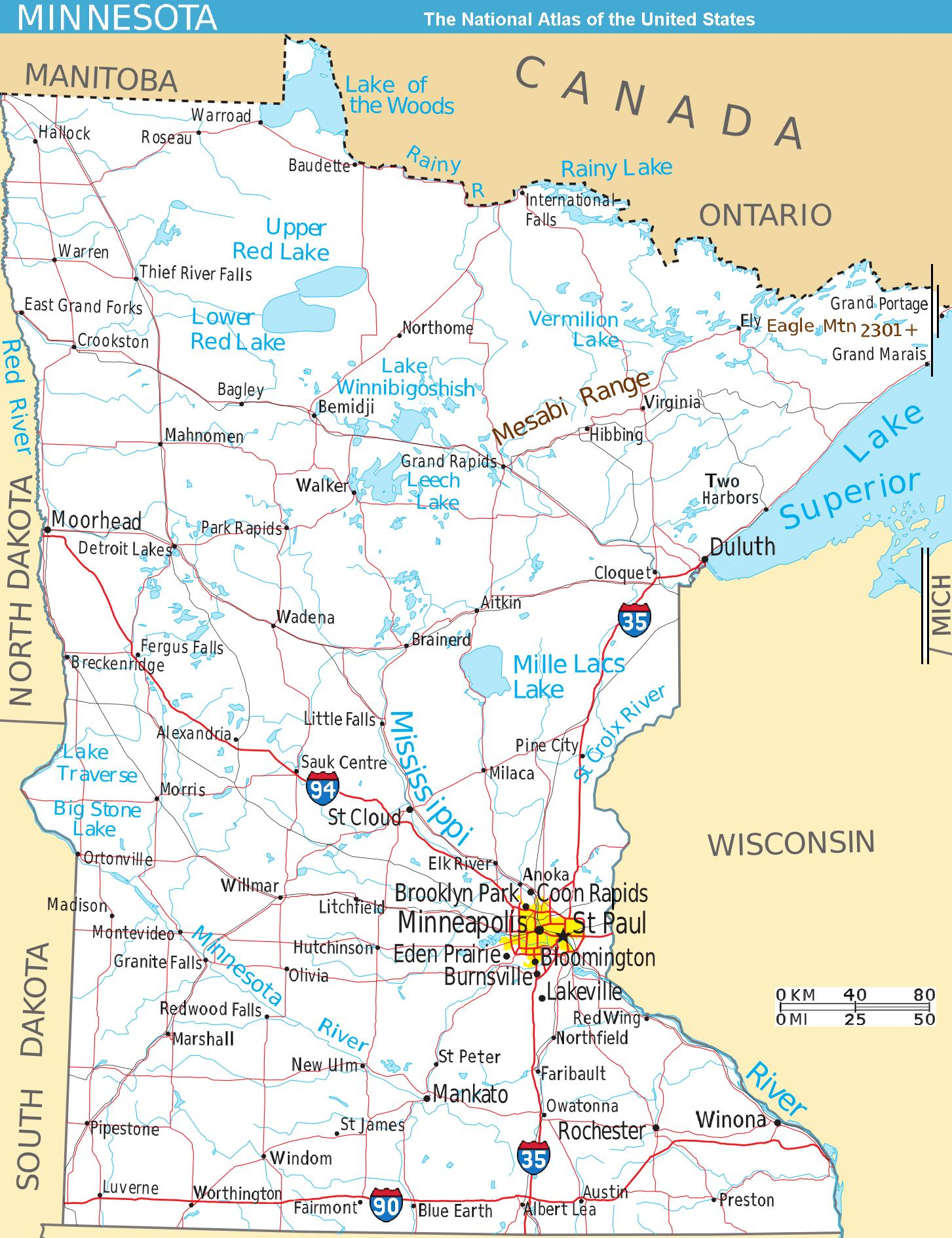
The Mesabi Range (upper center) is west of Lake Superior, north of Duluth, Minnesota, and far north of Minneapolis-St. Paul. Nearby towns include Grand Rapids, Hibbing, and Virginia.

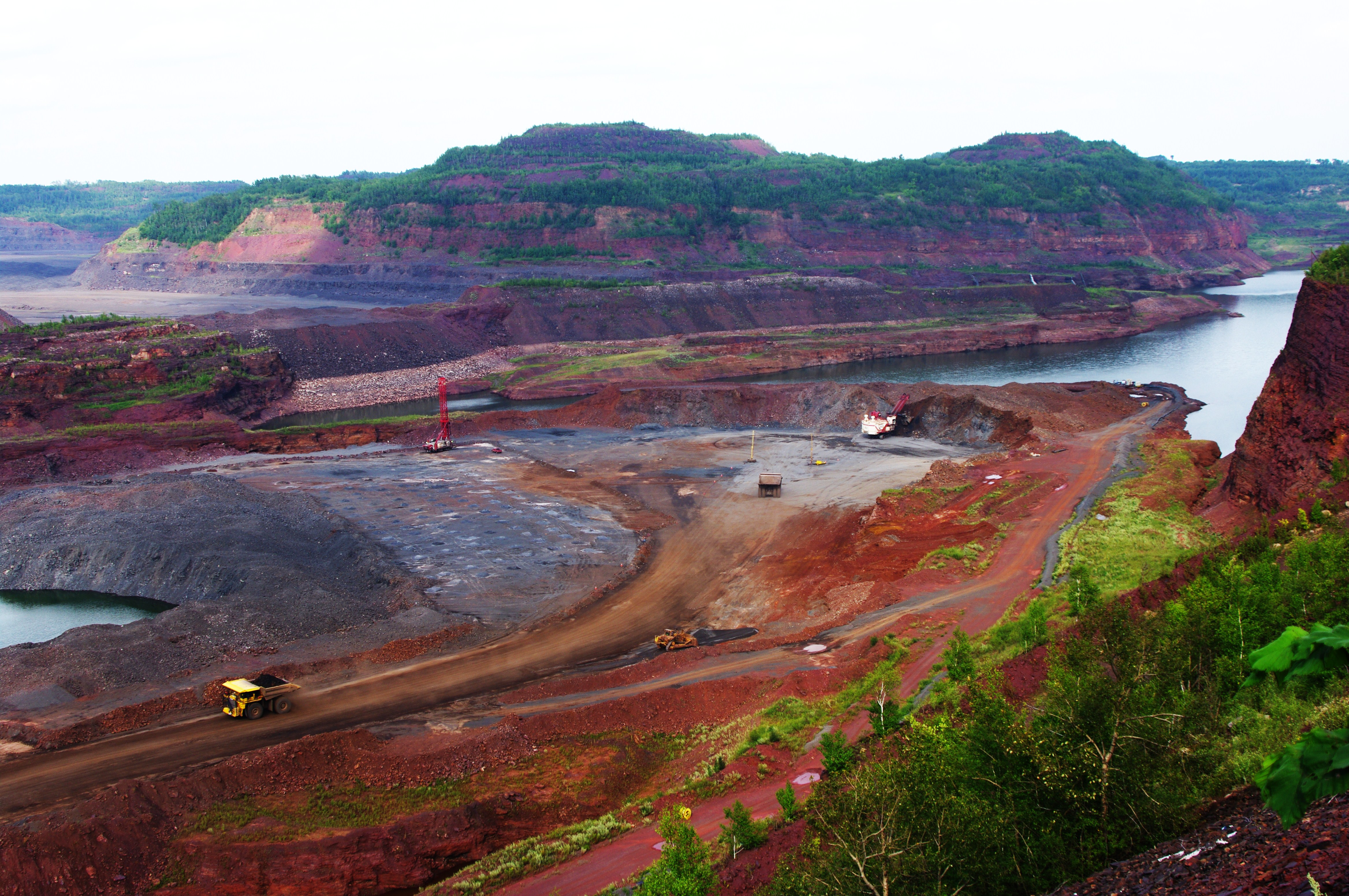
Hull–Rust–Mahoning Open Pit Iron Mine, Mesabi Range, 2010

The Mesabi Iron Range is a mining district and mountain range in northeastern Minnesota following an elongate trend containing large deposits of iron ore. It is the largest of four major iron ranges in the region collectively known as the Iron Range of Minnesota. First described in 1866, it is the chief iron ore mining district in the United States. The district is located largely in Itasca and Saint Louis counties. It has been extensively worked since 1892 and has seen a transition from high-grade direct shipping ores through gravity concentrates to the current industry exclusively producing taconite pellets. Production has been dominantly controlled by vertically integrated steelmakers since 1901 and therefore is dictated largely by US ironmaking capacity and demand.

== Name ==
The Mesabi Range was known to the local Ojibwe as Misaabe-wajiw ('Giant mountain'). Throughout the Mesabi Range, Mesaba and Missabe spelling variations are found along with places containing Giant in their names.

== Geology ==
There are four iron ranges in northern Minnesota: the Cuyuna, the Vermilion, the Mesabi, and the Gunflint. Most of the world's iron ore, including that contained in northern Minnesota, was formed during the middle Precambrian. During this period, erosion leveled mountains. This erosion released iron and silica into a shallow water marine environment. Algae living in this sea raised the level of oxygen, creating an oxidizing atmosphere known as the Great Oxidation Event. This oxygen catastrophe caused the eroded iron to precipitate into the banded iron formations found in northern Minnesota and other members of the Animikie Group. Over billions of years, geological forces left behind ore deposits of varied quality and concentrations – differences that would determine how the ore was mined from place to place. On the Mesabi Range, soft ore lay close to the surface where it could be scooped from open-pit mines.

The overall structure of the range is that of a monocline dipping 5 to 15 degrees to the southeast. Key faults include the Calumet, La Rue, Morton, Biwabik, and the Siphon. The Duluth Gabbro complex to the east has caused metamorphic changes in the Biwabik formation. The natural iron ores and the magnetite taconites occur in this Precambrian Biwabik formation, which is a cherty layer 340–750 feet (100–230 m) thick. The natural ores are located in elongated channels or tabular deposits, while the magnetite taconites occur in stratigraphic zones. Natural ores have an iron content of 51 to 57 per cent while the taconites are 30 to 35 percent iron, which are beneficiated to pellets contain 60 to 67 percent iron. The natural ores are mainly mixtures of hematite and goethite. The most common silicate is Minnesotaite. Also of note are the presence of algal structures in the Biwabik formation.

== Geography ==
The Mesabi Range is 110 miles (180 km) long. Heights vary from 200–500 feet (61–152 m). The highest point, located about 5.6 miles (9.0 km) northeast of Virginia, is Pike Mountain at 1,950 feet (590 m). The range trends from the northeast to the southwest, extending from Babbitt to Grand Rapids.

=== Embarrass Mountains ===
The Embarrass Mountains are a small subrange of the Mesabi Range, spanning about 9 miles (14 km) through northern White Township and Hoyt Lakes in St. Louis County. Heights vary from 200–400 feet (61–122 m). The highest point, at 1,940 feet (590 m), is roughly 1.9 miles (3.1 km) west of the unincorporated community of Hinsdale, near the former Erie Mining Company's pits and taconite processing plant.

== Mining operations ==
Iron-bearing rocks were noted by the Minnesota State Geologist Henry H. Eames in 1866. Iron ore was discovered north of Mountain Iron on November 16, 1890, by J. A. Nichols of the Merritt brothers. The range was defined by 1900. Initially underground mines were employed, but these gave way to open pits so that by 1902, half the operations were conducted this way. The last underground mine closed in 1960. Natural ores eventually gave way to iron-ore concentrates from magnetite taconite so that by 1965 one third of production came from these pellets.

Much of the softer ore was formed close to the surface, allowing mining operations to be conducted via open pit mines. The world's largest open pit iron ore mine is the Hull–Rust–Mahoning Open Pit Iron Mine in Hibbing. In the early years of mining from the late 19th century until the 1950s, mining focus was on high grade ore that could be processed into steel without much change. However, when that supply dried up, focus shifted to lower-grade ore (taconite) which requires extensive processing at large mining-processing facilities before moving to port. The mined ore is then transported, primarily by the Canadian National Railway, to the ports of Two Harbors and Duluth, and by BNSF Railway to Superior, Wisconsin. At Duluth, trains of up to eighty 100-ton open cars are moved out on massive ore docks to be dumped into lake freighters with tonnages of up to 60,000 for shipment to steel mills in Indiana and Ohio.

Dormant and exhausted open pit mines are a common feature along the Iron Range. Some of these sites have been redeveloped for other uses. For instance, the Virginia Pilot is a project which focuses on redeveloping the grounds adjacent to the old mines into low- to moderate-income residential space. The Hill-Annex Mine became a state park and offered tours to visitors who wished to learn about mine operations. The park was closed in 2024 as mining had become feasible again.

Currently, there are six mining-processing facilities in operation on the Iron Range. Cleveland-Cliffs owns and operates Northshore Mining, which has mining operations in Babbitt and crushing, concentrating (grinding) and pelletizing operations in Silver Bay, along with United Taconite which has mining operations in Eveleth and crushing, concentrating and pelletizing operations in Forbes. Arcelor Mittal owns and operates the Minorca Mine and Plant with mining operations near Biwabik and Gilbert and a crushing, concentrating and pelletizing facility near Virginia. United States Steel owns and operates both KeeTac and Minntac with mining and processing facilities in Keewatin and Mountain Iron respectively. Hibbing Taconite operates a mine and plant between Hibbing and Chisholm.

Mesabi Metallics is constructing a mine/plant near Nashwauk to mine and process taconite. Steel Dynamics and Kobe Steel formerly owned and operated Mesabi Nugget near Hoyt Lakes which did not mine its own material but produced high-iron content nuggets from purchased iron ore concentrate. Magnetation, Inc. formerly produced iron ore concentrate reclaimed from tailings with company-designed high-power magnetic separators to produce concentrate to sell and ship throughout the world.

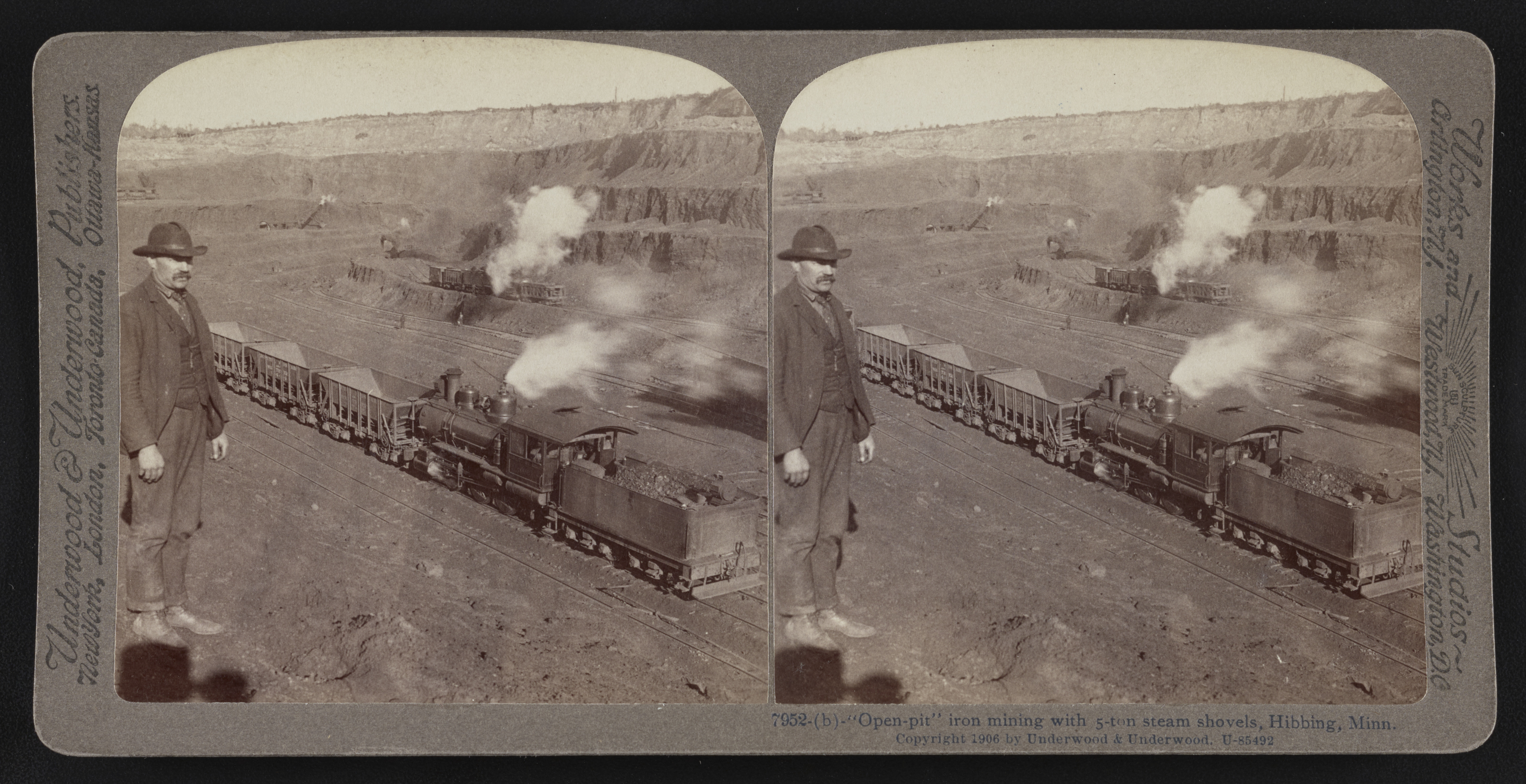
Open-pit iron mining with five-ton steam shovels, Hibbing, Minnesota c. 1906

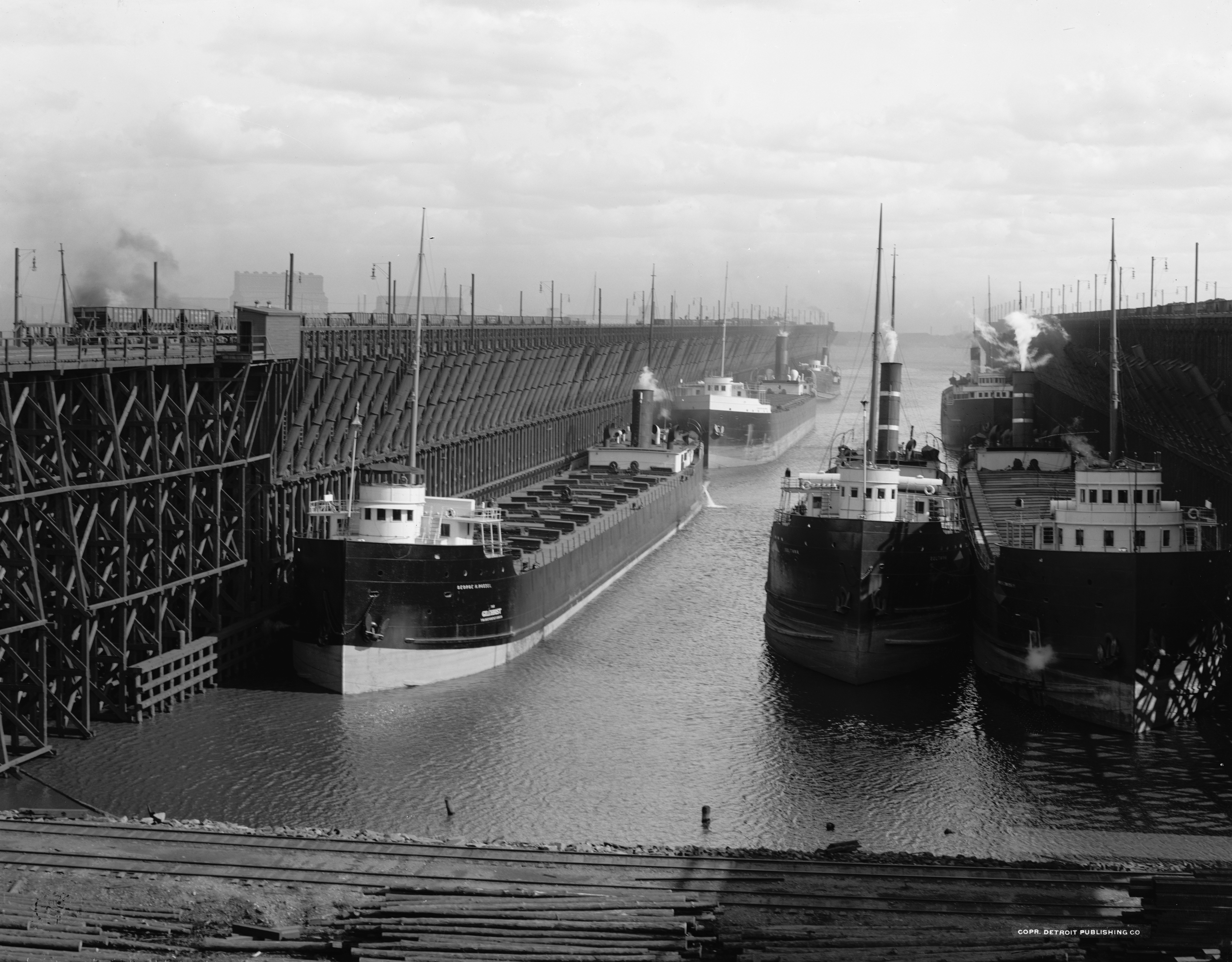
Duluth Ore Docks c. 1900–1915

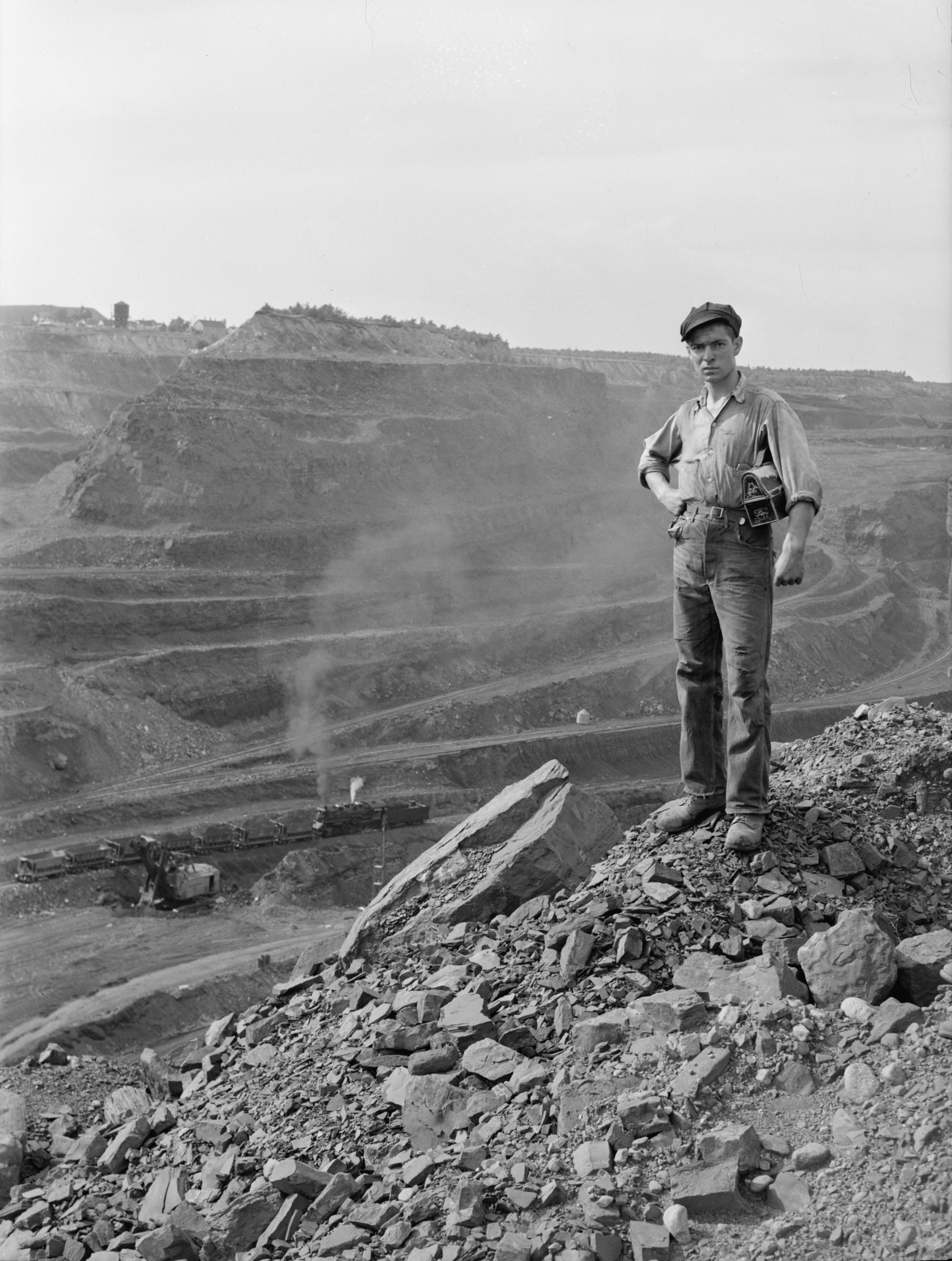
Hull–Rust–Mahoning Open Pit Iron Mine c. 1946

== Rockefellers' interests ==
John D. Rockefeller had previously loaned money to his brother, Frank Rockefeller, and Frank's business associate, James Corrigan, to buy into the Franklin Iron Mine Company, which operated in the Mesabi Range. By late 1896 or early 1897, John took Corrigan's shares due to failure to repay loans. Frank and Corrigan were forced to sell the company. The market for ore from the Mesabi Range was almost non-existent at this time because American steel furnaces were not built to deal with its powdery nature, and steelmakers believed it to be poor ore. John invested $40 million to build up the Mesabi mines and transportation business. To reach the steelmakers in Pittsburgh, the ore had to travel across the Great Lakes to Cleveland. He invested $2 million into a railroad to transport the ore from the Mesabi Range to Duluth on Lake Superior.

By 1896, he controlled the Lake Superior Consolidated Iron Mines Company, which was a holding company of the Merritt brothers. He built a fleet of ore ships. In December 1896, he made a deal with Henry W. Oliver and Andrew Carnegie of Pittsburgh whereby they agreed not to go into the ore field or transportation business, and Rockefeller agreed not to go into the steel business. The steelmakers adapted their mills to process the ore from the Mesabi Range. Oliver broke with the agreement, and in response Rockefeller procured a monopoly of ore ship transportation on the Great Lakes. Rockefeller sold his western ore holdings to J. P. Morgan for $90 million soon after Morgan bought Carnegie's steel interests in 1901.

== Labor strikes ==
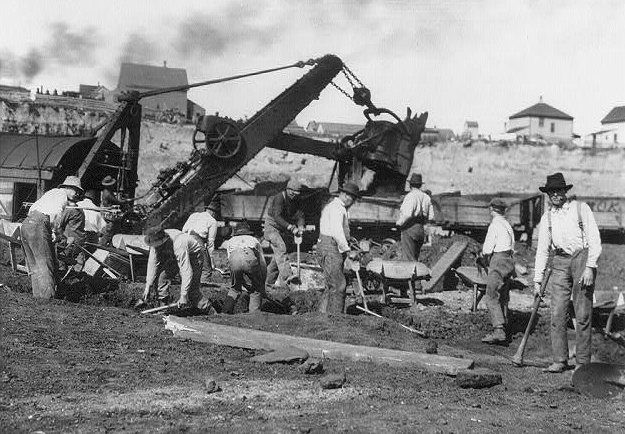
Miners at work on the Mesabi Range 1903.

Several large-scale strikes took place on the Mesabi Iron Range during the early 20th century. The first began on July 20, 1907 after the Western Federation of Miners asked Oliver Iron Mining Company for, among other demands, an eight-hour work day and a pay raise. The strike lasted two months and resulted in thousands of workers being blacklisted.

On June 25, 1916, a miner left his shift after being paid less than the contracted rate. His action led to the Mesabi Range strike of 1916. The Industrial Workers of the World quickly supported the strike for better pay and shorter hours. In September 1916, the workers voted to resume work, assuming a failed strike. However, shortly after returning to work a 10% raise in wages was issued for workers throughout the range.

== Present ==
The Mesabi Iron Range continues to play a central role in the economy and identity of northeastern Minnesota, although the region has undergone economic and demographic shifts since its peak mining years in the early 20th century. Iron mining remains active, with major companies including Cleveland-Cliffs and United States Steel operating taconite mining and processing facilities across the range.

Economic diversification has become a regional focus, with investments in health care, education, renewable energy, and tourism. Attractions such as the Minnesota Discovery Center in Chisholm, the Hull–Rust Mine View in Hibbing, and the Mesabi Trail draw visitors interested in the region’s mining heritage and natural landscape.

Redevelopment of former mine lands is also underway. In Virginia, the Rock Ridge Public Schools campus and the Virginia Pilot housing project are located on reclaimed mining sites. Similar efforts across the Range have converted former pits and tailings basins into parks, trails, and new residential areas. Examples include the Bruce Mine Headframe, Buhl Disc Golf Course, and West Two Rivers Recreation Area.

Like many rural areas in the Upper Midwest, the Iron Range faces demographic challenges, including an aging population, youth outmigration, and overall population decline. Regional agencies, such as the Iron Range Resources and Rehabilitation Board, have implemented workforce development and housing incentives to attract new residents and retain workers.

Culturally, the Iron Range retains strong ties to its labor and immigrant history, which are reflected in events such as the annual Iron Range Labor Day picnic, local ethnic festivals, and active historical societies. In recent years, the region has experienced a political shift, with many traditionally Minnesota Democratic–Farmer–Labor Party-leaning communities increasingly supporting Republican candidates in statewide and federal elections.

== See also ==
- Cliffs Shaft Mine Museum
- Cuyuna Range
- Gogebic Range
- Gunflint Range
- Hill-Annex Mine State Park
- Marquette Iron Range
- Rouchleau Mine
- Soudan Underground Mine State Park
- Vermilion Range (Minnesota)
