= Hibbing, Minnesota =

City in Minnesota, United States

Hibbing
- City
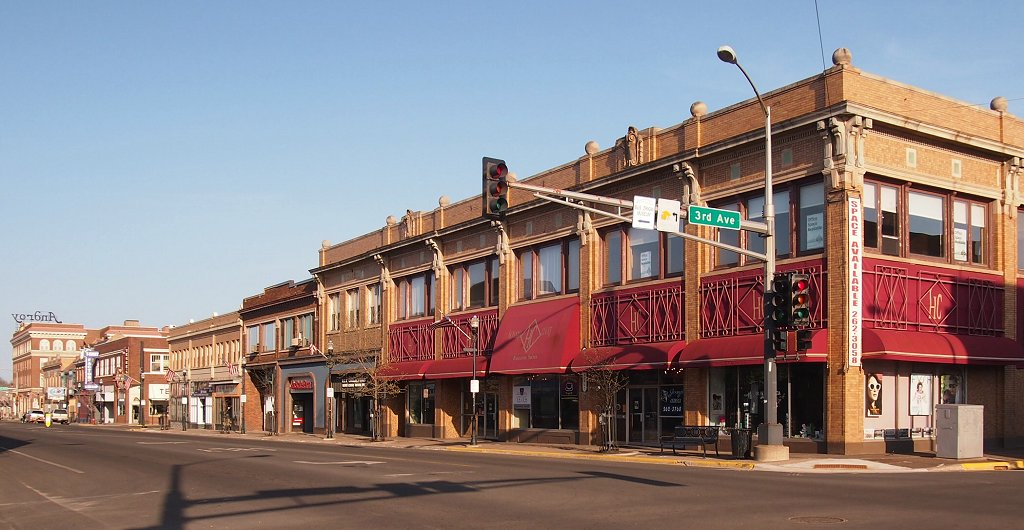
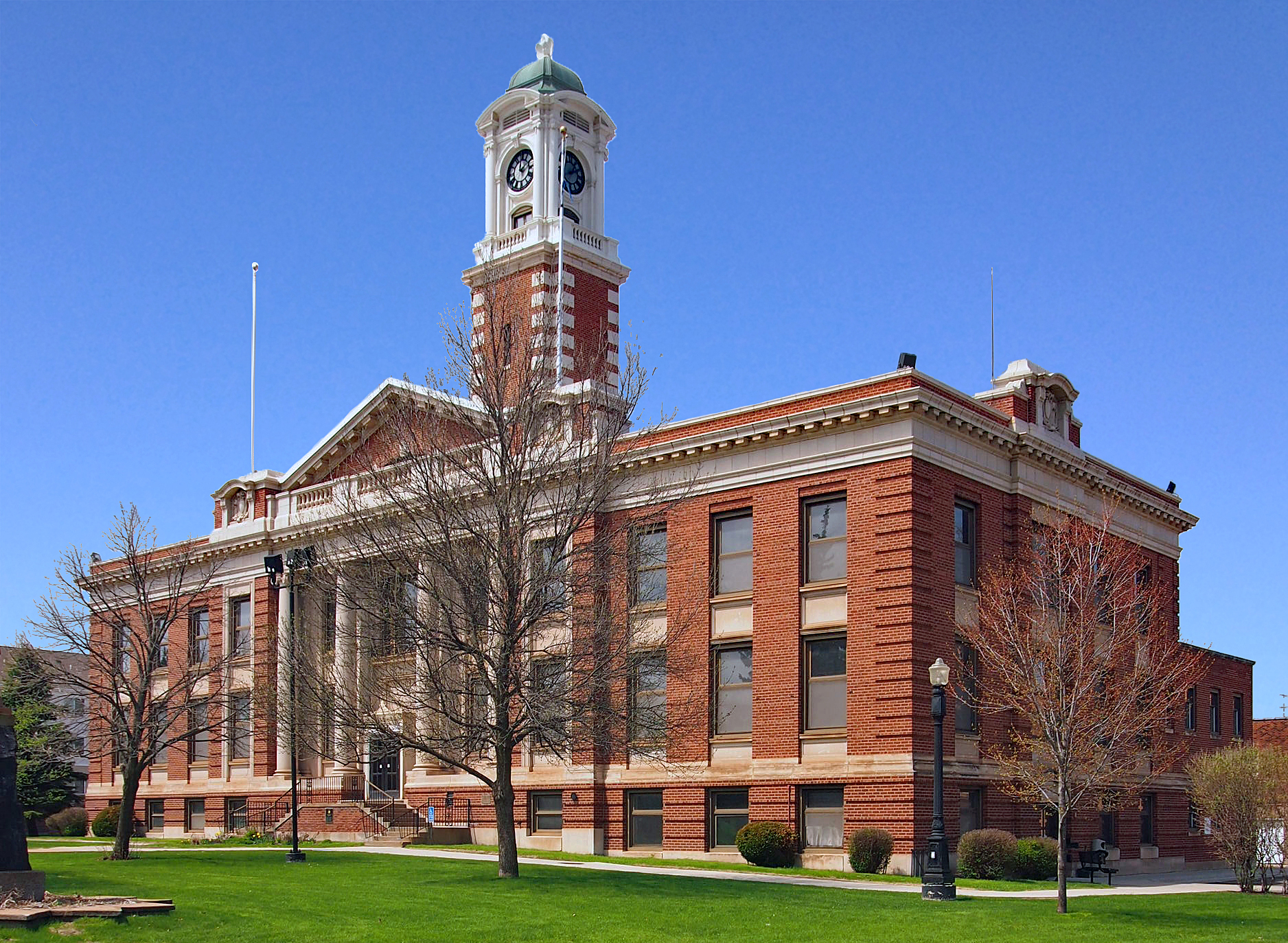
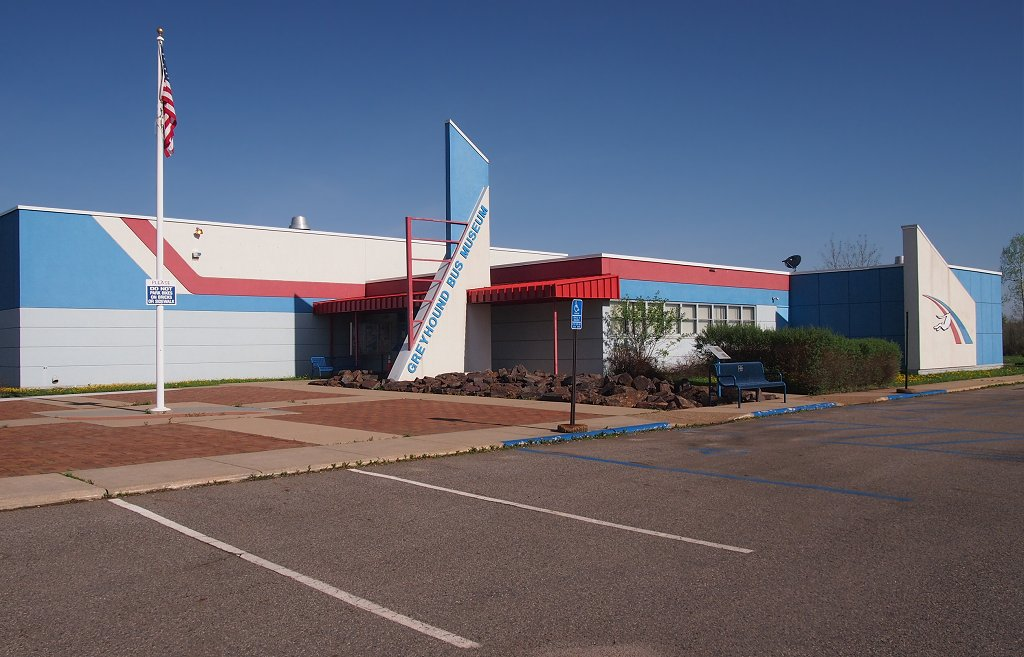
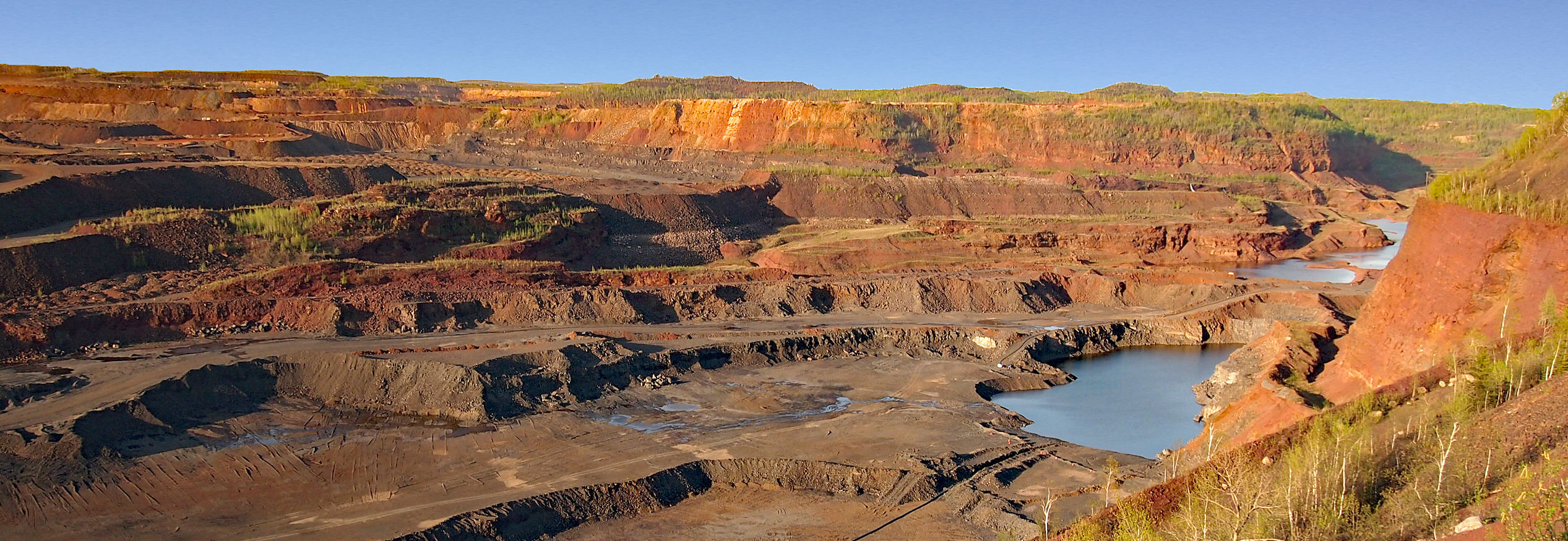
- Downtown Hibbing Hibbing City Hall Greyhound Bus Museum Hull-Rust-Mahoning Open Pit Iron Mine
- Motto: We're Ore And More.
- Location of the city of Hibbing within Saint Louis County, Minnesota

- Location within the United States
- Coordinates: 47°25′2″N 92°56′18″W
- Country: United States
- State: Minnesota
- County: Saint Louis
- Founded: 1893

Government
  - Mayor: Pete Hyduke

Area
  - Total: 186.46 sq mi (482.93 km^{2})
  - Land: 182.03 sq mi (471.45 km^{2})
  - Water: 4.43 sq mi (11.48 km^{2})
- Elevation: 1,490 ft (454 m)

Population (2020)
  - Total: 16,214
  - Estimate (2022): 16,052
  - Density: 89.1/sq mi (34.39/km^{2})
- Time zone: UTC−6 (Central (CST))
  - Summer (DST): UTC−5 (CDT)
- ZIP code: 55746
- Area code: 218
- FIPS code: 27-28790
- GNIS feature ID: 0661469
- Sales tax: 7.375%
- Website: hibbingmn.gov

Hibbing is a city in Saint Louis County, Minnesota, United States. The population was 16,214 at the 2020 census. The city was built on mining the rich iron ore of the Mesabi Iron Range and still relies on that industry today. At the edge of town is the world's largest open-pit iron mine, the Hull–Rust–Mahoning Open Pit Iron Mine.

Hibbing's main routes are U.S. Highway 169, State Highway 37, State Highway 73, Howard Street, and 1st Avenue. It is about 59 miles (95 km) northwest of Duluth, Minnesota.

== History ==
The town was founded in 1893 by Frank Hibbing, born in Walsrode, Germany, on December 1, 1856, and christened Franz Dietrich von Ahlen. His mother died when he was still in infancy and he took her name, Hibbing, when he sought his fortune in the New World. He first settled in Beaver Dam, Wisconsin, where he worked on a farm and in a shingle mill. Injured in a mill accident, he considered becoming a lawyer, but after deciding he was not familiar enough with the English language to make a legal career possible, he turned to timber cruising.

In 1887, Hibbing settled in Duluth, where he established a real estate business and began exploring the Vermilion Range. In 1892, he headed a party of 30 men at Mountain Iron and cut a road through the wilderness to Section 22, 58–20. An expert iron ore prospector, he soon discovered the surface indication that led him to believe there were extensive ore deposits.

In July 1893, the townsite of Hibbing was laid out and named in honor of him. Feeling personally responsible, he took pride in its development and, by his generous aid, made its progress possible. He used his personal means to provide a water plant, electric light plant, the first roads, hotel, sawmill, and bank building. For the last ten years of his life, Hibbing made his home in Duluth, where many of his business interests were centered. He retained close contact with the community that bore his name until dying of appendicitis on July 30, 1897, at age 40.

In 1914, Carl Wickman and Andrew "Bus Andy" Anderson started a bus line between Hibbing and Alice, Minnesota, that eventually became Greyhound Lines, the world's largest bus transportation company. The Greyhound Bus Museum is in Hibbing. Included in the display of Greyhound buses is the famous Scenicruiser General Motors made exclusively for Greyhound.

Hibbing Heights was platted in 1908 and annexed by Alice in 1910, when Alice incorporated as a city. Between 1919 and 1921, the Village of Hibbing moved immediately south of Alice and then annexed Alice in 1920. Hibbing remained a village until 1979 when the Town of Stuntz was annexed. An Article of Incorporation was filed in July 1979 with the state and Hibbing became a city from that action in January 1980.

Hibbing is home to the world's largest iron ore mine, which was discovered by Leonidas Merritt. Hibbing grew rapidly in its early years as huge iron ore mines such as the Mahoning, Hull, Rust, Sellers, and Burt provided the raw material for America's industrial revolution. In fact, the mines encroached on the village from the east, north, and west, and it was determined that some of the ore body actually went under the town, whose population hit 20,000 by 1915.

The city was rocked by the 1916 Mesabi Range strike, during which the mayor Victor L. Power supported and protected the strikers.

Negotiations between the Oliver Mining Company and the village finally brought about a plan whereby the entire village would relocate to a site two miles south, near Alice, and the company would develop the downtown buildings with low-interest loans that retailers could pay off over the years. New civic structures such as Hibbing High School, the Androy Hotel, the Village Hall, and the Rood Hospital were also constructed with mining company money. In all, about 200 structures were moved down the First Avenue Highway, as it was called, to the new city. These included a store and a couple of large hotels. Only one structure did not make it: the Sellers Hotel tumbled off some rollers and crashed to the ground, leaving, as one witness said, "an enormous pile of kindling". The move started in 1919 and the first phase was completed in 1921. Known today as "North Hibbing", this area remained a business and residential center until the 1940s, when the mining companies bought the remaining structures. The last house was moved in 1968.

On July 25, 1979, Hibbing annexed the Town of Stuntz, which comprised five townships. With this annexation, the following unincorporated communities were also annexed (community location by township, range and section indicated):

- Brooklyn (T57N, R20W, Section 6)
- Burton (T57N, R20W, Section 8)
- Darrow (T56N, R20W, Section 31)
- Dunwoody Junction (T57N, R20W, Section 3)
- Frederick (T56N, R20W, Section 18)
- Kelly Lake (T57N, R21W, Sections 16 and 21)
- Kerr (T57N, R21W, Section 14)
- Kitzville (T57N, R20W, Section 5)
- Lavinia (T58N, R21W, Section 25)
- Leetonia (T57N, R21W, Section 15)
- Leighton (T56N, R21W, Section 9)
- Little Swan (T56N, R20W, intersection of Sections 25, 26, 35 and 36)
- Mahoning (T57N, R21W, Section 2)
- Mitchell (T57N, R20W, Section 4)
- Onega (or Omega in some documents) (T56N, R20W, Section 24)
- Powers (T58N, R21W, Section 23)
- Redore (T57N, R20W, Section 5)
- Riley (T56N, R21W, Section 1)
- Ruby Junction (T57N, R20W, Section 7)
- Scranton (T57N, R21W, Section 13)
- Sims (T56N, R21W, Section 16)
- Stevenson (or Stephenson in some documents) (T58N, R21W, Section 7)
- Stuart (T56N, R21W, Section 29)
- Wilpen (T57N, R20W, Section 2)

On December 1, 1993, Northwest Airlink Flight 5719 crashed near Hibbing, killing all 18 people on board.

== Geography ==
According to the United States Census Bureau, the city has an area of 186.46 square miles (482.9 km^{2}), of which 182.03 square miles (471.5 km^{2}) is land and 4.43 square miles (11.5 km^{2}) is water. McCarthy Beach State Park is nearby.

The Northern Divide intersects the St. Lawrence Divide near Hibbing, with waters draining to the Hudson Bay, the Gulf of Mexico, and the Great Lakes.

=== Climate ===
Hibbing has a humid continental climate (Köppen: Dfb/Dwb), experiencing all four seasons, but with long winters. Summers are generally warm to very warm, while winters are generally frigid. A freeze has been recorded in every month of the year.

Climate data for Hibbing, Minnesota (Chisholm-Hibbing Airport), 1991–2020 normals, (Note: Mean monthly maxima and minima (i.e. the expected highest and lowest temperature readings at any point during the year or given month) calculated based on data at said location from 1991 to 2020.) extremes 1938–present
Month	Jan	Feb	Mar	Apr	May	Jun	Jul	Aug	Sep	Oct	Nov	Dec	Year
Record high °F (°C)	51 (11)	60 (16)	80 (27)	89 (32)	95 (35)	97 (36)	98 (37)	95 (35)	95 (35)	87 (31)	72 (22)	60 (16)	98 (37)
Mean maximum °F (°C)	38.0 (3.3)	43.8 (6.6)	57.5 (14.2)	72.6 (22.6)	83.6 (28.7)	87.1 (30.6)	88.7 (31.5)	87.2 (30.7)	83.2 (28.4)	74.8 (23.8)	54.6 (12.6)	40.1 (4.5)	90.4 (32.4)
Mean daily maximum °F (°C)	16.9 (−8.4)	22.5 (−5.3)	35.4 (1.9)	49.5 (9.7)	63.4 (17.4)	72.2 (22.3)	76.7 (24.8)	74.9 (23.8)	65.7 (18.7)	50.8 (10.4)	34.3 (1.3)	21.4 (−5.9)	48.6 (9.2)
Daily mean °F (°C)	6.2 (−14.3)	10.5 (−11.9)	23.8 (−4.6)	37.1 (2.8)	49.5 (9.7)	58.9 (14.9)	63.5 (17.5)	61.6 (16.4)	53.0 (11.7)	40.2 (4.6)	25.6 (−3.6)	12.3 (−10.9)	36.9 (2.7)
Mean daily minimum °F (°C)	−4.4 (−20.2)	−1.4 (−18.6)	12.2 (−11.0)	24.8 (−4.0)	35.7 (2.1)	45.7 (7.6)	50.3 (10.2)	48.3 (9.1)	40.3 (4.6)	29.7 (−1.3)	16.9 (−8.4)	3.1 (−16.1)	25.1 (−3.8)
Mean minimum °F (°C)	−29 (−34)	−25.2 (−31.8)	−14.2 (−25.7)	10.6 (−11.9)	23.4 (−4.8)	32.2 (0.1)	39.0 (3.9)	36.7 (2.6)	25.8 (−3.4)	16.2 (−8.8)	−3.6 (−19.8)	−22.2 (−30.1)	−32.5 (−35.8)
Record low °F (°C)	−50 (−46)	−44 (−42)	−37 (−38)	−6 (−21)	14 (−10)	25 (−4)	32 (0)	27 (−3)	20 (−7)	0 (−18)	−27 (−33)	−38 (−39)	−50 (−46)
Average precipitation inches (mm)	0.51 (13)	0.53 (13)	0.91 (23)	1.61 (41)	2.76 (70)	4.36 (111)	3.85 (98)	3.09 (78)	3.06 (78)	2.35 (60)	1.09 (28)	0.64 (16)	24.76 (629)
Average snowfall inches (cm)	15.0 (38)	7.1 (18)	7.8 (20)	3.7 (9.4)	0.0 (0.0)	0.0 (0.0)	0.0 (0.0)	0.0 (0.0)	0.0 (0.0)	1.2 (3.0)	13.2 (34)	12.3 (31)	60.3 (153)
Average precipitation days (≥ 0.01 in)	7.2	5.0	6.4	8.1	12.0	13.1	11.5	10.7	12.0	11.1	8.0	7.8	112.9
Average snowy days (≥ 0.1 in)	10.9	6.9	5.9	3.0	0.2	0.0	0.0	0.0	0.1	1.5	7.3	10.6	46.4
Source: NOAA (snow 1981–2010)

== Demographics ==
Historical population
Census	Pop.	Note	%±
1900	2,481		—
1910	8,832		256.0%
1920	15,089		70.8%
1930	15,666		3.8%
1940	16,385		4.6%
1950	16,276		−0.7%
1960	17,731		8.9%
1970	20,744		17.0%
1980	21,193		2.2%
1990	18,046		−14.8%
2000	17,071		−5.4%
2010	16,361		−4.2%
2020	16,214		−0.9%
2022 (est.)	16,052		−1.0%
U.S. Decennial Census; 2020 Census

=== 2020 census ===
As of the 2020 census, Hibbing had a population of 16,214. The median age was 42.6 years. 21.5% of residents were under the age of 18 and 21.8% of residents were 65 years of age or older. For every 100 females there were 97.0 males, and for every 100 females age 18 and over there were 94.7 males age 18 and over.

74.2% of residents lived in urban areas, while 25.8% lived in rural areas.

There were 7,403 households in Hibbing, of which 24.2% had children under the age of 18 living in them. Of all households, 37.5% were married-couple households, 23.7% were households with a male householder and no spouse or partner present, and 30.1% were households with a female householder and no spouse or partner present. About 39.7% of all households were made up of individuals and 17.4% had someone living alone who was 65 years of age or older.

The population density was 89.1 inhabitants per square mile (34.4/km^{2}), and the average housing unit density was 45.6 per square mile (17.6/km^{2}). There were 8,302 housing units, of which 10.8% were vacant. The homeowner vacancy rate was 1.8% and the rental vacancy rate was 12.8%.

Racial composition as of the 2020 census
Race	Number	Percent
White	14,798	91.3%
Black or African American	245	1.5%
American Indian and Alaska Native	140	0.9%
Asian	77	0.5%
Native Hawaiian and Other Pacific Islander	11	0.1%
Some other race	70	0.4%
Two or more races	873	5.4%
Hispanic or Latino (of any race)	253	1.6%

=== 2010 census ===
As of the census of 2010, there were 16,361 people, 7,414 households, and 4,325 families living in the city. The population density was 90.0 inhabitants per square mile (34.7/km^{2}). There were 8,200 housing units at an average density of 45.1 per square mile (17.4/km^{2}). The racial makeup of the city was 95.9% White, 0.6% African American, 0.9% Native American, 0.4% Asian, 0.3% from other races, and 1.9% from two or more races. Hispanic or Latino of any race were 1.1% of the population.

There were 7,414 households, of which 26.3% had children under the age of 18 living with them, 42.5% were married couples living together, 11.1% had a female householder with no husband present, 4.8% had a male householder with no wife present, and 41.7% were non-families. 36.4% of all households were made up of individuals, and 14.8% had someone living alone who was 65 years of age or older. The average household size was 2.17 and the average family size was 2.80.

The median age in the city was 42.5 years. 21.6% of residents were under the age of 18; 8.6% were between the ages of 18 and 24; 22.7% were from 25 to 44; 29.4% were from 45 to 64; and 17.8% were 65 years of age or older. The gender makeup of the city was 48.4% male and 51.6% female.

=== 2000 census ===
As of the census of 2000, there were 17,071 people, 7,439 households, and 4,597 families living in the city. The population density was 94.0 inhabitants per square mile (36.3/km^{2}). There were 8,037 housing units at an average density of 44.2 per square mile (17.1/km^{2}). The racial makeup of the city was 97.33% White, 0.46% Black, 0.73% Native American, 0.27% Asian, 0.01% Pacific Islander, 0.19% from other races, and 1.01% from two or more races. Hispanic or Latino of any race were 0.68% of the population. 17.1% were of German, 12.4% Finnish, 10.5% Norwegian, 9.4% Italian, 6.4% Irish and 5.9% Swedish ancestry.

There were 7,439 households, out of which 27.7% had children under the age of 18 living with them, 48.3% were married couples living together, 9.6% had a female householder with no husband present, and 38.2% were non-families. 33.5% of all households were made up of individuals, and 15.5% had someone living alone who was 65 years of age or older. The average household size was 2.24 and the average family size was 2.86.

In the city, the population was spread out, with 22.8% under the age of 18, 9.1% from 18 to 24, 24.5% from 25 to 44, 23.8% from 45 to 64, and 19.8% who were 65 years of age or older. The median age was 41 years. For every 100 females, there were 93.1 males. For every 100 females age 18 and over, there were 89.4 males.

The median income for a household in the city was $33,346, and the median income for a family was $43,558. Males had a median income of $38,064 versus $22,183 for females. The per capita income for the city was $18,561. About 8.1% of families and 11.7% of the population were below the poverty line, including 16.3% of those under age 18 and 8.2% of those age 65 or over.

== Politics ==
United States presidential election results for Hibbing, Minnesota
Year	Republican		Democratic		Third party(ies)	
Year	No.	%	No.	%	No.	%
2024	4,338	51.83%	3,840	45.88%	191	2.28%
2020	4,266	49.74%	4,094	47.74%	216	2.52%
2016	3,681	46.35%	3,674	46.26%	587	7.39%
2012	2,863	33.84%	5,418	64.04%	179	2.12%
2008	2,914	33.44%	5,629	64.60%	171	1.96%
2004	2,924	31.90%	6,154	67.15%	87	0.95%
2000	2,726	32.00%	5,277	61.95%	515	6.05%
1996	2,000	24.59%	5,136	63.16%	996	12.25%
1992	1,936	20.67%	5,548	59.25%	1,880	20.08%
1988	2,853	30.51%	6,498	69.49%	0	0.00%
1984	3,000	30.32%	6,894	69.68%	0	0.00%
1980	3,119	28.54%	6,962	63.71%	846	7.74%
1976	2,909	30.74%	6,355	67.16%	198	2.09%
1968	2,282	26.42%	6,131	70.99%	224	2.59%
1964	2,283	26.48%	6,326	73.38%	12	0.14%
1960	3,299	35.75%	5,908	64.02%	21	0.23%

== Education ==
Hibbing is home to Minnesota North College – Hibbing, a two-year community and technical college.

Hibbing High School, a public school serving grades 6–12, was built between 1920 and 1926 in the Tudor Revival style; it received the Bellamy Award in 1968 and is listed on the National Register of Historic Places.

== Media ==
=== AM ===
- 1240 kHz WMFG

=== FM ===
- 88.7 MHz WHPJ
- 89.3 MHz K207ES
- 90.1 MHz KADU
- 93.9 MHz WTBX
- 98.3 MHz W252AN
- 106.3 MHz WMFG-FM

=== TV ===
• 11 KRII

- 13 WIRT-DT
- 31 WRPT

=== Newspapers ===
The Hibbing Daily Tribune newspaper was founded in Hibbing in 1893 and served readers in Saint Louis County. In 2020 it merged with the Mesabi Daily News to become the Mesabi Tribune of Virginia, Minnesota. The Tribune is owned by Adams Publishing Group. It is published daily, except Monday, with a circulation of 3,749 in 2019.

== Notable people ==
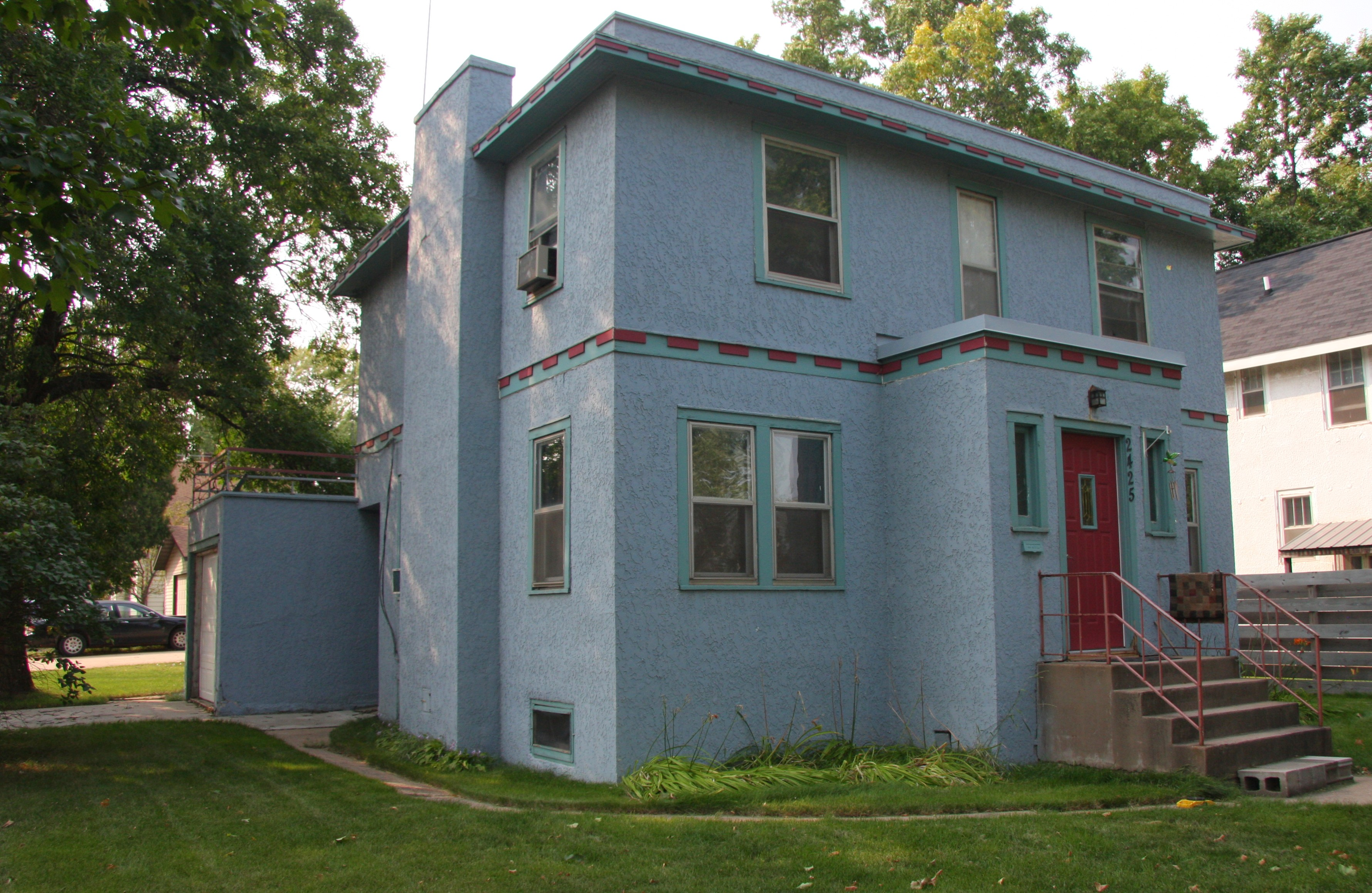
Bob Dylan's childhood home in Hibbing

Hibbing is the hometown of singer-songwriter Bob Dylan, NBA Hall-of-Famer Kevin McHale, MLB outfielder Roger Maris, and former Governor of Minnesota Rudy Perpich.

- Corey Adam, stand-up comedian
- Bernard J. Bischoff, Minnesota state representative and judge
- Joe Bretto, professional ice hockey player, Chicago Blackhawks
- Milton Brink, ice hockey player
- Vincent Bugliosi, prosecutor of serial killer Charles Manson
- Bruce Carlson, United States Air Force general, director of National Reconnaissance Office
- Frankie Campbell, boxer killed in a match by Max Baer in 1930
- Carl Mario D'Aquila, Minnesota state representative, journalist, and businessman
- Steve Deger, juvenile nonfiction author
- Bob Dylan (born Robert Zimmerman in Duluth), musician, singer-songwriter, Rock and Roll Hall of Famer, winner of 2016 Nobel Prize in Literature
- Ron Dicklich, Minnesota state senator
- Steve Enich, professional football player
- Jack Fena, Minnesota state representative and judge
- Dick Garmaker, professional basketball player
- Gus Hall, leader of Communist Party USA and four-time US presidential candidate
- Jeff Halper, professor of anthropology, author, activist, co-founder of Israeli Committee Against House Demolitions
- Rufus Wilber Hitchcock, newspaper editor, educator, and Minnesota state legislator
- Karl Jacob (born and raised), actor and filmmaker
- Carl Jacobson, Minnesota state representative and businessman
- Adam Johnson, professional ice hockey player
- Chi Chi LaRue, film director
- Bob Latz, Minnesota state representative and lawyer
- Roger Maris, professional baseball player, broke Babe Ruth's single-season home run record
- Kevin McHale, professional basketball player, won three NBA championships with Boston Celtics, named one of 50 Greatest Players in NBA History; served as Minnesota Timberwolves' vice president and as head coach of Houston Rockets, broadcaster for NBA on TNT
- Bethany McLean, co-author of Enron: The Smartest Guys in the Room
- Joe Micheletti, professional ice hockey player, Olympics and NHL television analyst in NYC, won two NCAA championships with Minnesota Golden Gophers
- Pat Micheletti, professional ice hockey player, younger brother of Joe
- Robert Mondavi, wine entrepreneur
- Lona Minne, Minnesota state representative
- Timothy Murphy, poet and businessman
- Marie Myung-Ok Lee, novelist and essayist
- Carol J. Oja, music historian at Harvard University
- Benjamin B. Patterson, Minnesota state senator and businessman
- Jeno Paulucci, founder of Jeno's Pizza and Chun King Foods brands
- Rudy Perpich, dentist who served two terms as Governor of Minnesota
- Scott Perunovich, 2020 Hobey Baker Award winner; St Louis Blues defenseman
- Elmer Peter Peterson, Minnesota state legislator and electrician
- John (Jack) Petroske, member of 1956 U.S. Olympic Hockey Team, winning a silver medal
- Gary Puckett, lead singer and namesake of 1960s band Gary Puckett and the Union Gap was born in Hibbing
- Frank Riley, co-winner of second Hugo Award for Best Novel, was born in Hibbing
- Scott Sandelin, professional ice hockey player, won two NCAA championships with North Dakota Fighting Sioux and three as head coach of Minnesota–Duluth Bulldogs men's ice hockey
- John P. Sheehy, architect
- Rudy Sikich, football player
- John J. Spanish, Minnesota state representative
- Carl Wickman, founder and longtime CEO of Greyhound Lines

== In popular culture ==
In the film The Great Flamarion, Connie tells Flamarion she is going to Hibbing for three months.

Hibbing is the setting for two episodes of the fantasy horror television series Supernatural.

Bazooka and Tripwire, fictional G.I. Joe characters, were born in Hibbing.

Michael York's character in the film Wrongfully Accused is named Hibbing Goodhue. Many of the characters' names are based on Minnesota cities.

== Sister cities ==
- Walsrode, Lower Saxony (Germany)
