= Bruce Mine Headframe =

Mining relic in Minnesota

- U.S. National Register of Historic Places
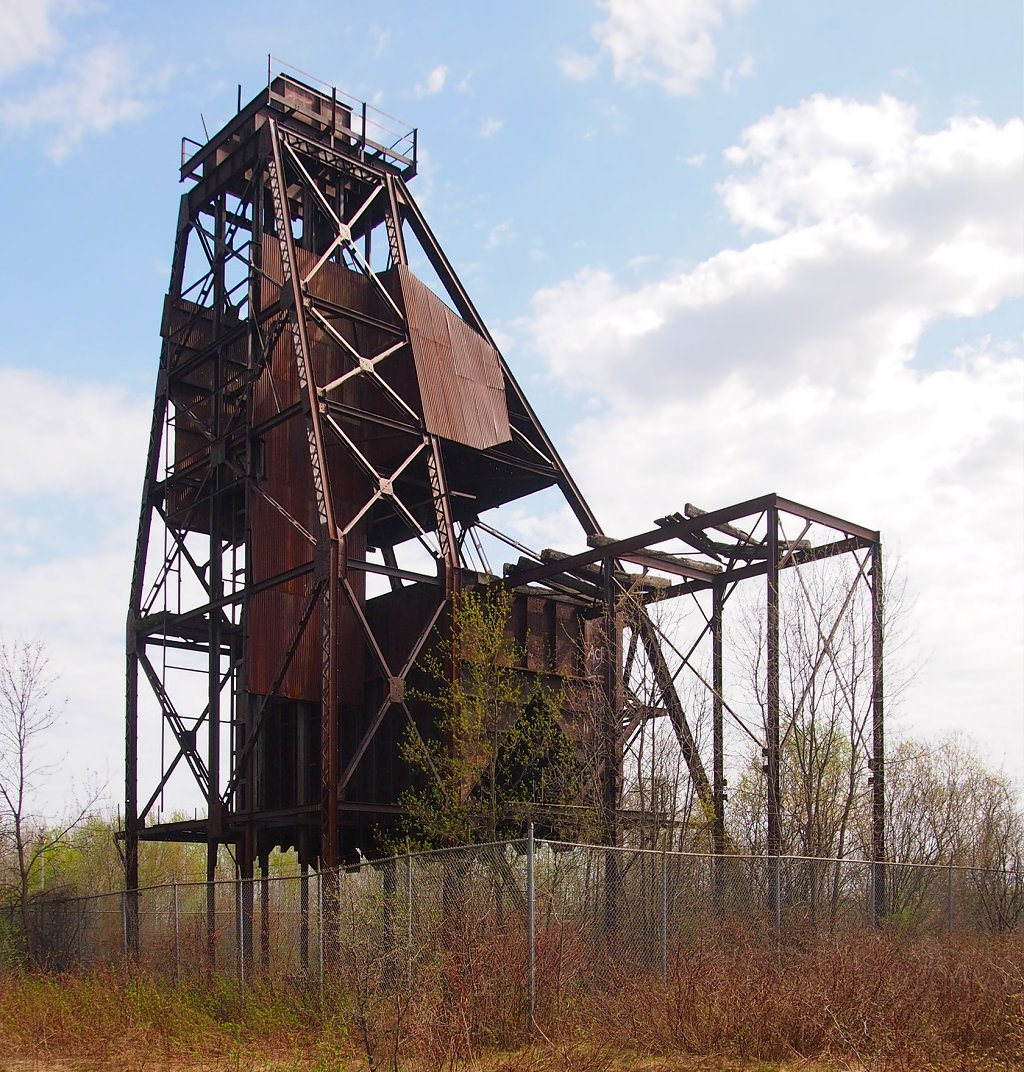
- The Bruce Mine Headframe viewed from the Mesabi Trail

- Location within Minnesota Location within the United States
- Location: off U.S. Highway 169, Chisholm, Minnesota
- Coordinates: 47°28′37.5″N 92°51′54″W
- Area: 1 acre (0.40 ha)
- Built: 1925–26
- Built by: International Harvester
- NRHP reference No.: 78003124
- Added to NRHP: November 28, 1978

The Bruce Mine Headframe is the headframe of a former underground mine in Chisholm, Minnesota, United States. It was built 1925–26 and operated until the mine closed in the early 1940s. The Bruce Mine Headframe was listed on the National Register of Historic Places in 1978 for its state-level significance in the theme of engineering. It was nominated for being the last standing example of the headframes that once proliferated on the Mesabi Range. Most of the other headframes were dismantled as open-pit mining overtook underground mining as the dominant extraction method in the region.

The Bruce Mine Headframe is adjacent to the Mesabi Trail. After six years of planning and negotiation for access rights, the non-profit Chisholm Beautification Association began developing a park around the headframe in 2018. The Chisholm Beautification Association worked with multiple entities to establish historic interpretive signage, pathways, and other park amenities at Bruce Mine Headframe Park and Trailhead. On August 4, 2023, Chisholm Beautification Association hosted a ribbon cutting ceremony in celebration of the completion of the park. The historic headframe is owned and operated by the city of Chisholm. An outdoor recreation hub, the trailhead serves as a launching pad for the paved Mesabi Trail, Redhead Mountain Bike Park, and the Chisholm ATV Trail System.

== See also ==
- National Register of Historic Places listings in St. Louis County, Minnesota
