= Elmer Peter Peterson =

American politician (1904–1979)

Elmer Peter Peterson (July 10, 1904 – January 22, 1979) was an American electrician and politician.

Peterson was born in Palmer, Marquette County, Michigan and moved with his family to Minnesota when he was twelve years old. He lived in Hibbing, Minnesota with his wife and family and worked as an electrician for the Hibbing School District. Peterson served in the Minnesota House of Representatives from 1941 to 1946 and in the Minnesota Senate from 1947 to 1962. He died in St. Louis County, Minnesota.
