= Hibbing High School =

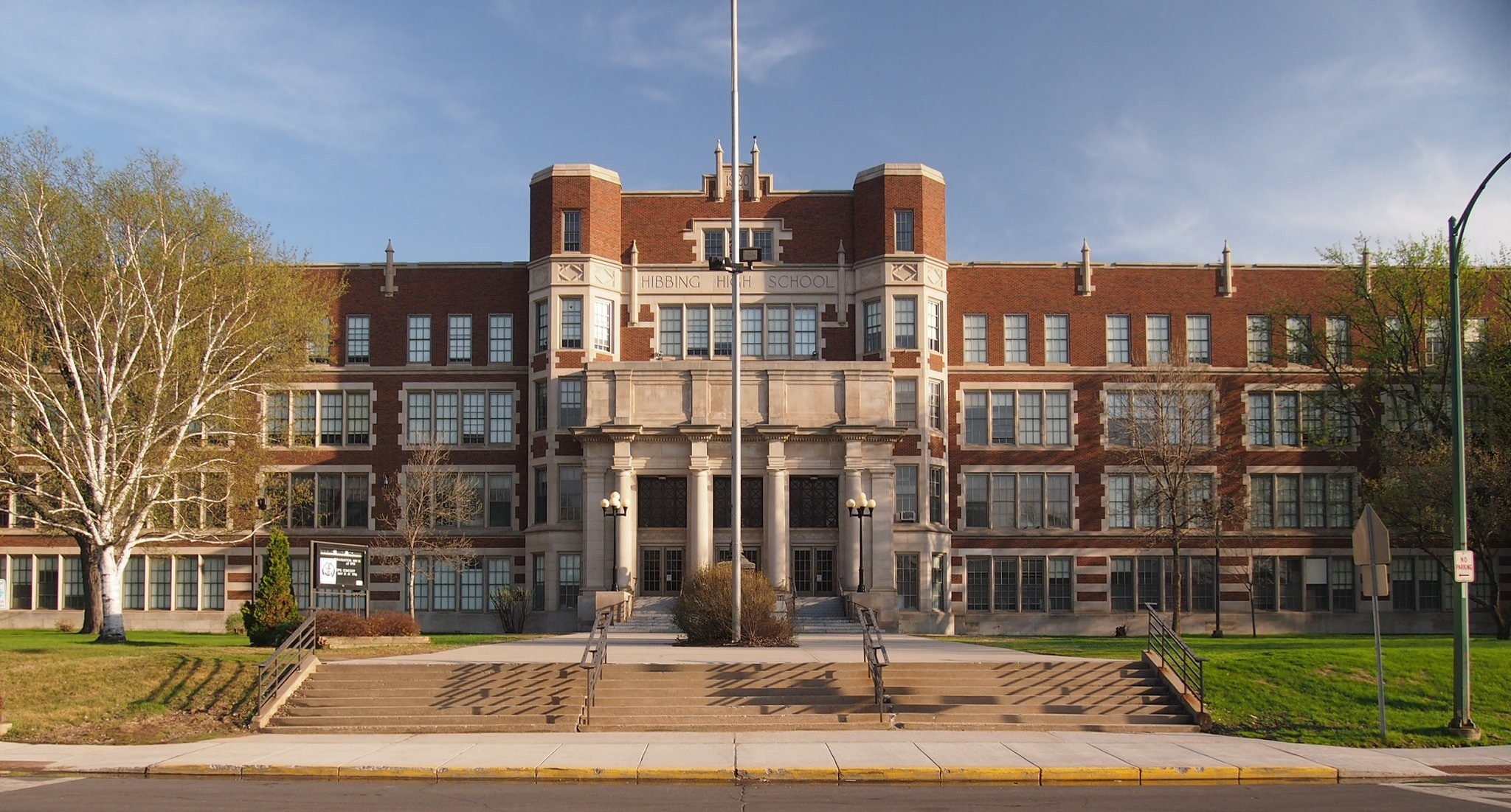
- Hibbing High School from the north

Location
- 800 East 21st Street, Hibbing, Minnesota; 55746-1803; United States; 47°25′32″N 92°55′57″W

Information
- Type: Public
- School district: Hibbing Public School District
- Principal: Ranae Seykora
- Grades: 7–12
- Enrollment: 1,018 (2023–2024)
- Colors: Navy blue, white
- Teams: Hibbing Bluejackets
- Yearbook: Hematite
- Website: highschool.isd701.org
- Hibbing High School
- U.S. National Register of Historic Places
- Location within Minnesota Location within the United States
- Area: 2.5 acres (1.0 ha)
- Built: 1919–1924
- Architect: W.T. Bray
- Architectural style: Tudor Revival
- NRHP reference No.: 80004351
- Added to NRHP: August 11, 1980

Hibbing High School is a public school, grades 6–12, in Hibbing, Minnesota, United States. It was built from 1920 to 1922 as the entire city relocated two miles (3 km) south to make way for the expanding Hull–Rust–Mahoning Mine. The lavish Tudor Revival building was constructed at a cost of about $3.9 million (equivalent to $62,678,571 in 2025), becoming known as the "castle in the woods" and—thanks to its polished brass fixtures—the "school with the golden doorknobs". The project was bankrolled by the mining industry, which wanted to make the move more palatable for those being displaced. It also satisfied immigrants' desire for their children's education.

Hibbing High School is listed on the National Register of Historic Places. Visitors may tour the building on their own during the school year or on guided tours during the summer.

== Amenities ==
The school features a lavishly decorated 1,800-seat auditorium built from 1922 to 1924. It was patterned after the Capitol Theatre in New York City. The chandeliers were built at a cost of $15,000 each, with cut glass from Belgium. They are now each insured for $250,000. The auditorium also contains a 1900-pipe organ from the Barton Organ Company, which can play any orchestra instrument except for the violin.

== History ==
Hibbing High School received the Bellamy Award in 1968, an honor given to one school nationwide annually for outstanding academic achievements.

The school was listed on the National Register of Historic Places in 1980 for its state-level significance in the themes of architecture, education, industry, and politics/government. It was nominated for its sumptuous Jacobethan architecture and association with the mutual desire by corporations and residents for improved public education as the mining industry mechanized.

On November 26, 1996 construction on a new addition to the building caused a fire. Although the fire was extinguished before it reached the original building, a significant amount of smoke damage had occurred. School had to be suspended for over a month while cleaning took place.

== Notable alumni ==
- Carl Mario D'Aquila, Minnesota politician
- Richard DeMillo, professor of computer science at Georgia Tech
- Bob Dylan, Nobel prize winner, singer-songwriter, author, and visual artist
- Dick Garmaker, basketball player
- Deion Harris, football player
- Adam Johnson, ice hockey player
- Delores J. Knaak, Minnesota politician
- Kevin McHale, basketball player, 3× NBA Champion, Basketball Hall of Famer
- Bethany McLean, journalist
- Carly Melin, Minnesota politician
- Jeno Paulucci, businessman
- Scott Perunovich, ice hockey player
- Julie Sandstede, Minnesota politician
- Rudy Sikich, former football tackle
- John J. Spanish, Minnesota politician

== See also ==
- National Register of Historic Places listings in St. Louis County, Minnesota
