= Jack Fena =

American politician and judge

Jack Richard Fena (December 23, 1923 – June 4, 2010) was an American politician and judge.

== Biography ==
Fena was born in Hibbing, Minnesota and graduated from Hibbing High School in 1941. He graduated from the University of Notre Dame in 1943 and received his law degree from Notre Dame Law School in 1952. He served in the United States Marine Corps during World War II. He practiced law in Hibbing and was a Democrat. Fena served in the Minnesota House of Representatives from 1959 to 1968 and from 1971 to 1972. Fena contested the 1968 election with Bernard J. Bischoff. He then was an assistant county attorney for St. Louis County, Minnesota. From 1977 to 1981, Fena was a judge of the Minnesota Tax Court. Fena died at Benedictine Health Center in Duluth, Minnesota.
