= Hibbing City Hall =

- U.S. National Register of Historic Places
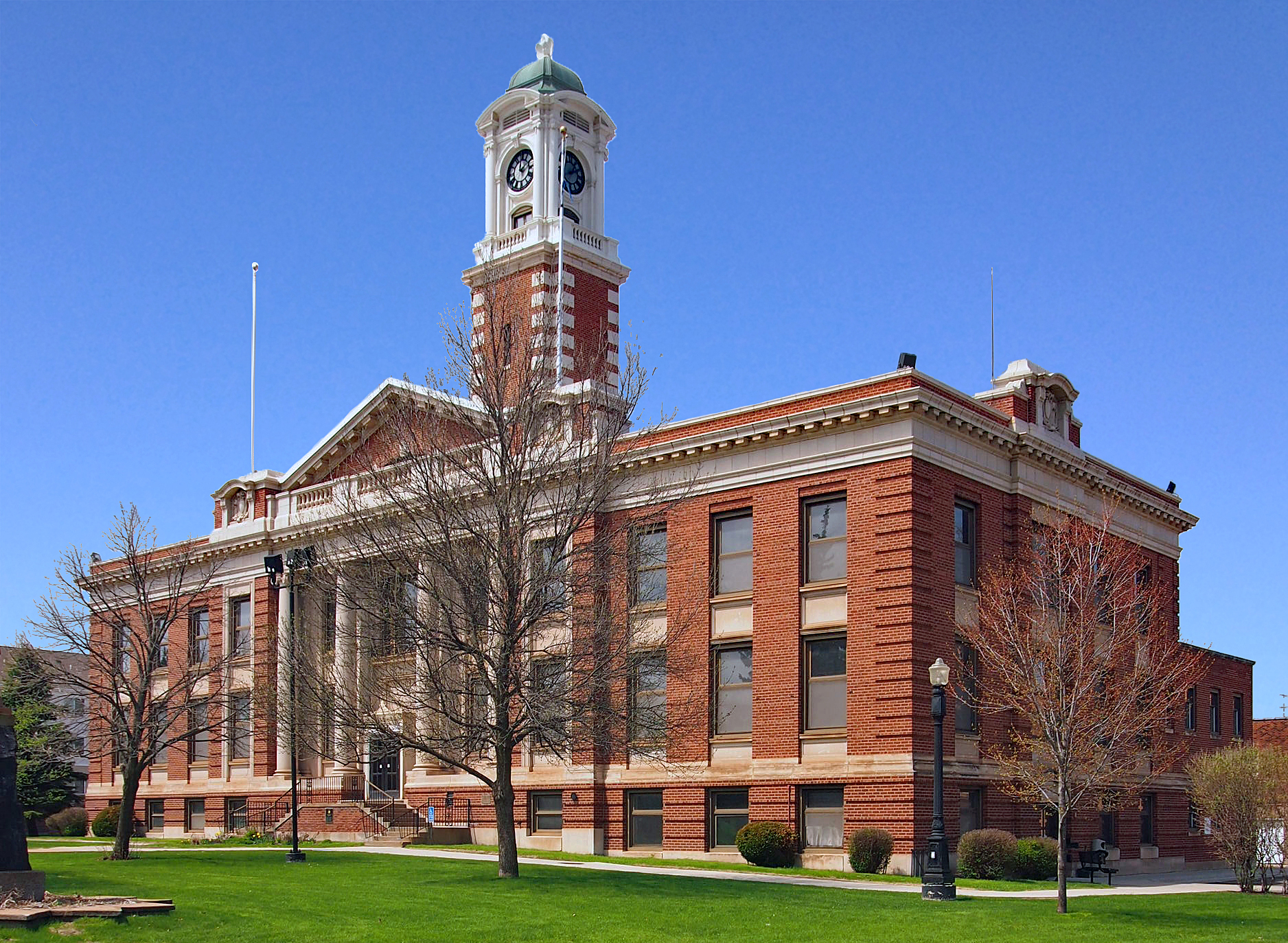
- Hibbing City Hall from the southeast

- Location within Minnesota Location within the United States
- Location: 401 E. 21st Street, Hibbing, Minnesota
- Coordinates: 47°25′36″N 92°56′14″W
- Area: Less than one acre
- Built: 1922
- Architect: Holstead & Sullivan
- Architectural style: Colonial Revival
- NRHP reference No.: 81000683
- Added to NRHP: February 12, 1981

Hibbing City Hall is the seat of local government for Hibbing, Minnesota, United States. It was built in Colonial Revival style in 1922. Hibbing City Hall was listed on the National Register of Historic Places in 1981 for its state-level significance in the themes of architecture and politics/government. It was nominated for being one of northern Minnesota's most architecturally distinctive public buildings and the longstanding seat of government for one of the largest communities of the Iron Range.

== See also ==
- List of city and town halls in the United States
- National Register of Historic Places listings in St. Louis County, Minnesota
