= Minnesota Discovery Center =

Museum and venue complex

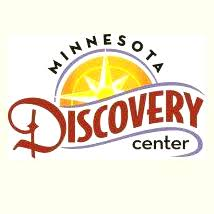

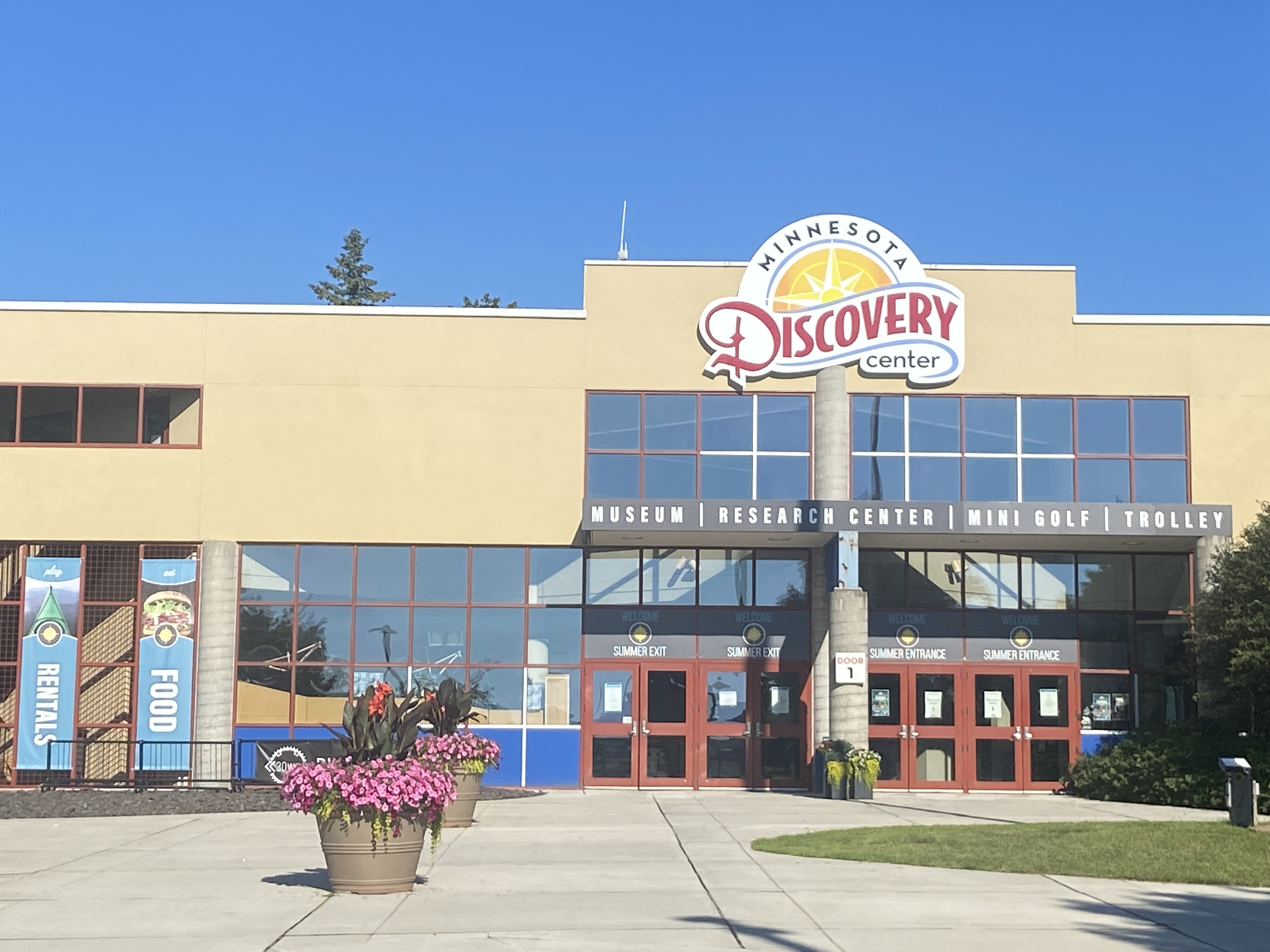
- The Minnesota Discovery Center summer entrance
- Location: 1005 Discovery Drive; Chisholm, Minnesota, USA
- Coordinates: 47°28′41″N 92°53′46″W
- Type: History, industry
- Website: www.mndiscoverycenter.com

The Minnesota Discovery Center, formerly known as Ironworld Discovery Center and originally as the Iron Range Interpretive Center, opened in the 1977 outside Chisholm, Minnesota, United States. It showcases northeastern Minnesota's "history and future" and includes a museum, entertainment venue, research center and library, and a park. The site offers various community programs and events including Polka fests, concerts, and fairs. The property includes a memorial to Rudy Perpich and holds historical documents and artifacts related to mining in the Iron Range.

== History ==
The 660-acre (270 ha) museum complex opened in 1977 as the Iron Range Interpretive Center with 34 exhibits and was renamed in 1984 as Ironworld USA. In 2009 it became the Minnesota Discovery Center. The Minnesota Discovery Center is operated by a non-profit organization called the Ironworld Development Corporation (IDC). The organization was established in 2003 to manage the facility and transition from being a state-run entity. The transition was completed in 2007.

It was built to celebrate the immigrants who built Minnesota's Iron Range mining region, including Italians, Finns, and Yugoslavs. It was supposed to draw tourists from around the state and other parts of the U.S., but in the late 1990s was struggling to live up to attendance expectations.

Due to shifting ground on the property with mine shafts beneath it, the tourist attraction faced a $2 million to $7 million cost in 2004 for filling and shoring up its foundation or to do complete reconstruction. It is located on the old Glen Mine property where there are abandoned mine shafts.

The Center include a 1920s trolley that travels along a "picturesque" 2.4-mile (3.9 km) railway that winds around the Pillsbury mine pit and Glen mine disembarking at Wilpen Train Depot. There is a renovated 1905 Hill's Finn Boarding House. There is also the Pellet Pete 19 hole mini-golf course. The museum has two floors of "exhibits about labor history, geology, mining, immigration and other aspects of the industrial and cultural history of the region," including the taconite mining process and the evolution of the industry on the Iron Range.

== See also ==
- List of museums in Minnesota
