= Mount McKay =

Mountain in Ontario, Canada

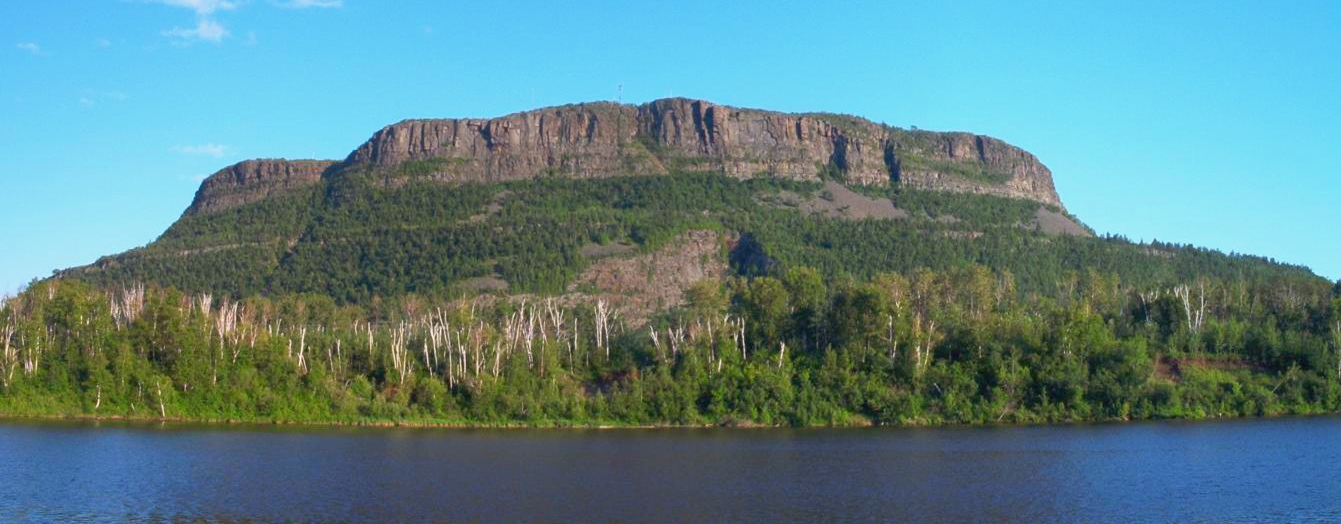
- Mount McKay as seen from the Neste Boat Launch

Highest point
- Elevation: 489 m (1,604 ft)
- Coordinates: 48°20′41″N 89°17′12″W

Geography
- Location within Ontario
- Location: Fort William First Nation, Ontario, Canada
- Parent range: Nor'Wester Mountains
- Topo map: NTS 52A6 Thunder Bay

Geology
- Rock age: Precambrian
- Mountain type: Sill

Mount McKay (Ojibwe: Anemki Wajiw) is a mafic sill located south of Thunder Bay, Ontario, Canada, on the First Nation Reserve of the Fort William First Nation.

It is the highest, most northern and best known of the Nor'Wester Mountains. It formed during a period of magmatic activity associated with the large Midcontinent Rift System about 1,100 million years ago.

Since 1933, there is a road allowing for access to a plateau on the mountain.

== Name ==
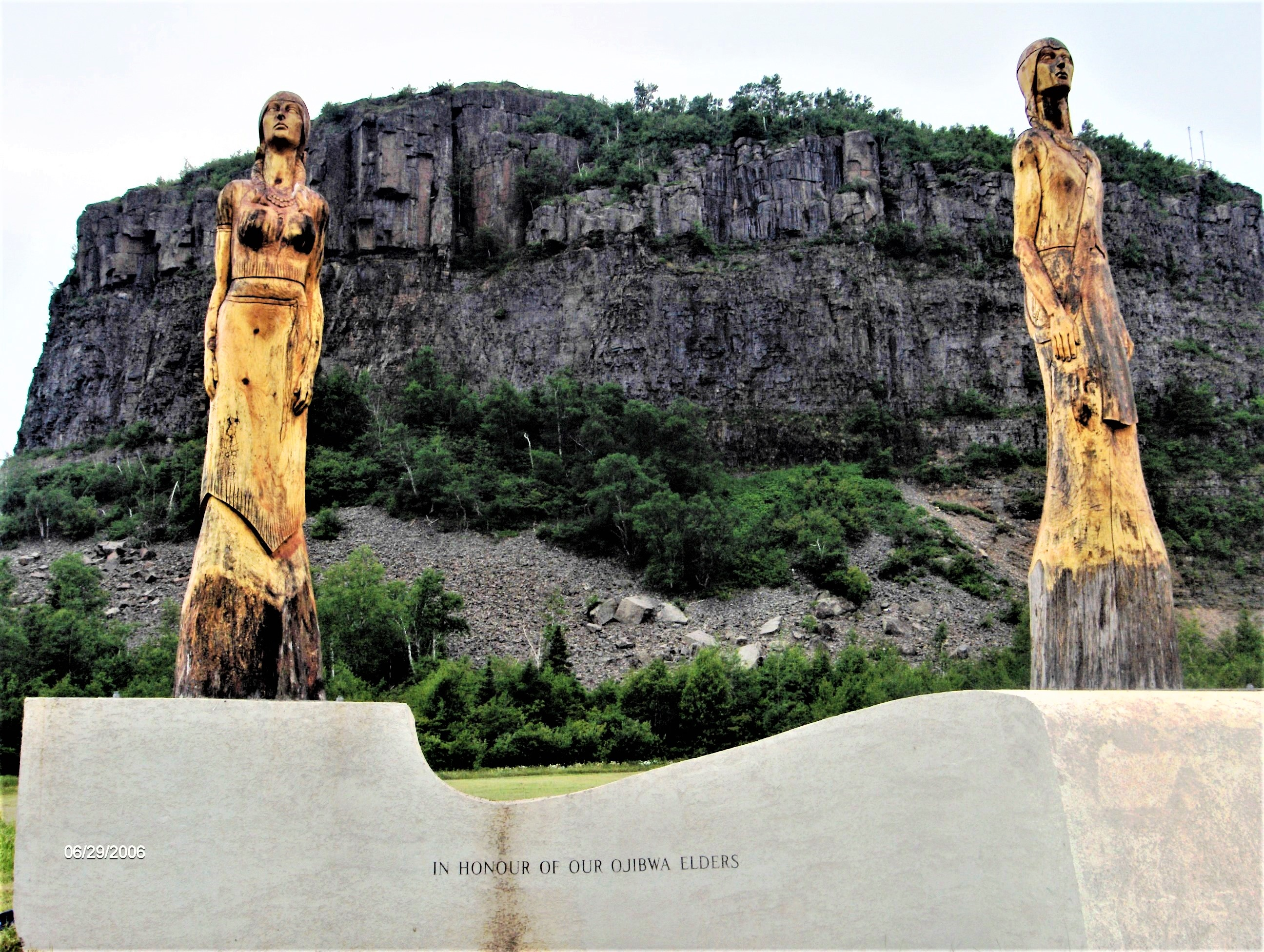
Ojibwe Elder monument

Mount McKay is known by the Fort William First Nation as Anemki Wajiw (also written as: Anemki-Wajiw, Animikii Wajiw, Animikii-Wajiw, Anemki-waucheu, or Anemki-Waucheuin) in Ojibwe or Thunder Mountain in English.

The English name "Mount McKay", evolved from "Mackay's Mountain" and later, "McKay's Mountain", after William Mackay, a Scottish free trader who resided in the Fort William area sometime between 1821 and 1857.

== Geology ==
Mount McKay is 299 m (981 ft) above Lake Superior and 483 m (1,585 ft) above sea level. It is a flat-topped hill flanked by steep cliffs on three sides.

Mount McKay is composed of shale and greywackes – the Rove Formation – which is covered by the hard, protective 60 m (200 ft) thick diabase cap. The Rove Formation is part of the Animikie Group. The Rove sedimentary layers in the Nor'Wester Mountains are overlain by a 60 m (200 ft) cap of diabase; this Logan diabase is 1115 ± 1 million years old. This diabase cap is the erosional remnant of a sill that once extended over the entire area. Most of it is covered by a thick layer of mineral soil.

The north face of Mount McKay shows evidence that below this cap is another 7.2 m (24 ft) thick sill of very hard diabase. This sill is also an erosional remnant and is 96 m (315 ft) below the first cap and 190 m (620 ft) below the top of the hill – or 242 m (794 ft) above sea level.

== Features ==
A lookout exists on the lower eastern plateau at an elevation of 300 metres (980 ft), providing a view of Thunder Bay and the city's harbour. A small memorial commemorates Aboriginal people that fought in wars. There is a path on the eastern face of the mountain that can be used for hiking. Plants on the mountain include red and sugar maple and poison ivy (animikiibag—"thunder-leaf" in the Ojibwe language). The top of the mountain has glacial erratics and jack pines. A small grove of yellow birch grows just south of the entrance gate.

A small, unmaintained trail can be used to reach the top from the lookout via the north face, with a heavy gauge steel cable that can be used for support. However, due to the grade and geology (mostly shale) of the face, this unsanctioned hike is considered dangerous, and is not recommended for novice hikers.

There is also somewhat of a trail on the west side of the mountain. Shale is predominant in this area, making the western climb considerably less dangerous than the north face.

There is a notice posted on a billboard at the lookout requesting that visitors "do not climb mountain." Animikii-wajiw is considered sacred ground by the members of the Fort William First Nation, on whose traditional territory the mountain stands.

== See also ==
- Volcanism of Eastern Canada
