= Rove Formation =

Sedimentary rock formation

The Rove Formation is a sedimentary rock formation of Middle Precambrian age underlying the upper northeastern part of Cook County, Minnesota, United States, and extending into Ontario, Canada. It is the youngest of the many layers of sedimentary rocks which constitute the Animikie Group.

Before the Rove sediments were laid down, during the Archean Eon, the Algoman orogeny added landmass along a border from South Dakota to the Lake Huron region; this boundary is the Great Lakes tectonic zone. Several million years later a thin layer of hypervelocity impact ejecta from the Sudbury impact event was deposited on the older, underlying, Gunflint Iron Formation, and the Rove was then deposited on top of the ejecta; it is estimated that at ground zero the earthquake generated by the meteor impact would have registered 10.2 on the Richter scale.

During the Middle Precambrian a shallow inland sea covered much of the Lake Superior region and formed the Animikie Group of sedimentary rocks overlying 2700-million-year-old Archean rocks.

After the Rove Formation sediments were deposited, the Penokean orogeny added more land mass by accretion that occurred from the south. A few hundred million years later the proto-North American continent nearly split in half along the Midcontinent Rift, which is a bow-shaped rift extending from northeast Kansas, arcing through the present-day Lake Superior Basin and then angling southeast through Michigan. Then came a period of advancing and retreating glaciers. The more resistant diabase sills and dikes remained, while the softer shales were bulldozed away by the glaciers. The north path of glaciation is transverse to the general trend on the valleys and ridges.

As a result of erosion of sandstone and the erosion-resistant sills and dikes, the topography in Minnesota has repeated parallel hills and valleys. The tightly packed lakes in the narrow valleys are long and narrow, and they orient from the east to west. The cliffs in these narrow valleys are the habitat to several rare plants which prefer living in narrow cliff areas in a sub-Arctic climate. In Ontario the Rove Formation is overlain by a thick diabase cap.

== Location ==
Bedrock geological map of Minnesota which shows the location northeastern Minnesota on the small inset state map. The Rove Formation is along the eastern Minnesota-Canada border.

The Rove Formation is in the Arrowhead Region of northeastern Minnesota, U.S., and extends into Ontario, Canada. In Minnesota it occurs along the U.S.-Ontario border from Gunflint Lake to Pigeon Point (both in northeastern Cook County) and northward into Canada. Pigeon Point is the most eastern part of Minnesota; it is a diabase sill about 152 m (500 ft) thick. Both the north and south coasts of the point expose Rove slates under and over the sill. Within the sill, rates of cooling and gravity have created an interesting distribution of rock types.

The visible formation is in Minnesota and contains many east–west oriented ridges and valleys. Many lakes in this 5 to 8 km (3 to 5 mi) wide band along the Canada–US border are in the elongated east–west valleys; included are Caribou, Clearwater, Crocodile, Daniels, Duncan, Dunn, Hungry Jack, Iron, Loon, Moose, Pine, Portage and South. In Ontario the Rove Formation is overlaid by a thick diabase sill.

== Geologic history ==
=== Archean Eon ===
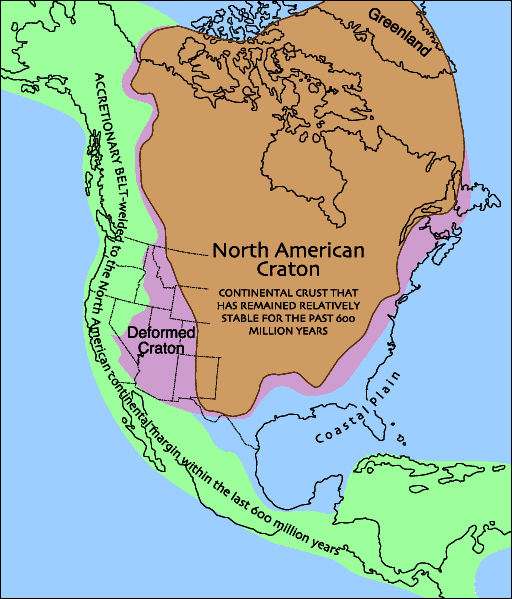
The brown area shows the part of the North American continent that has been stable for over 600 million years.

The Archean Eon lasted from 3,800 million years ago until approximately 2,500 million years ago.

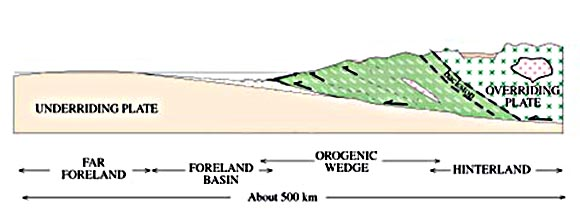
During the Algoman orogeny continental plates collided; this diagram shows the dynamics of such a collision.

The Algoman orogeny occurred 2800 to 2,500 million years ago, and it marks the end of the crust-building Archean Eon. There were several episodes of continental collision, compression and subduction which resulted in mountain building during this time. Orogenic events are characterized by extensive metaphorism, granitic extrusions and unconformities. The Algoman orogeny added landmass along a border from South Dakota to the Lake Huron region; this boundary is the Great Lakes tectonic zone (GLTZ).

Northeast Minnesota has 2700-million-year-ago exposed rocks formed during volcanic activity that was in the form of seepage of lava from rifts in the sea floor. These lava flows began to rise up out of the ancient ocean to form the Superior Craton; the Superior craton later assembled into the Canadian Shield, which became part of the North American craton. The Superior province is the largest preserved fragment of Archean crust, and the Canadian shield is the nucleus of the North American craton.

=== Proterozoic Eon ===
The Proterozoic Eon lasted from 2,500 million years ago until 570 million years ago

==== Animikie Group ====
The Animikie Basin, measuring 700 km × 400 km (430 mi × 250 mi), is an elongated oval straddling the North Shore of Lake Superior, mainly in Minnesota. Approximately the northwestern two-thirds lies to the northwest of the shoreline; the southeastern third lies to the southeast of the shoreline (so is under Lake Superior's waters).

During the Middle Precambrian a shallow inland sea covered much of the Lake Superior region and formed the Animikie Group, which are layers of sedimentary rocks which unconformably overlies 2700-million-year-old Archean rocks. This group contains both the Rove and Gunflint Iron formations. The Rove Formation is the youngest of the many Animikie layers; it consists of gently tilted fine-grained sediments. It is composed of greywackes and black shale, and contains lower concentrations of iron and taconite than the underlying Gunflint Iron Formation does.

The Rove Formation consists of a lower argillite unit, a middle transition unit and an upper thin-bedded greywacke unit. The lower argillite unit is about 150 m (490 ft) thick; this layer contains fine-grained greywacke, and silty and graphitic argillites. Greywacke is a sedimentary rock composed of a mixture of poorly sorted grains of sand, silt and clay particles. Argillite is a fine-grained sedimentary rock composed primarily of clay particles; they are essentially lithified muds and oozes. Greywacke is abundant in the middle unit and dominates the upper unit. The complete thickness of the upper two units is about 900 m (3,000 ft).

Gunter Faure and Jack Kovach, using Rb-Sr dating, determined the age to be 1635 ±24 million years old. The Resident Geologist Program, Geology of the Thunder Bay South District, reports an age of 1800 million years old.

==== Penokean orogeny ====
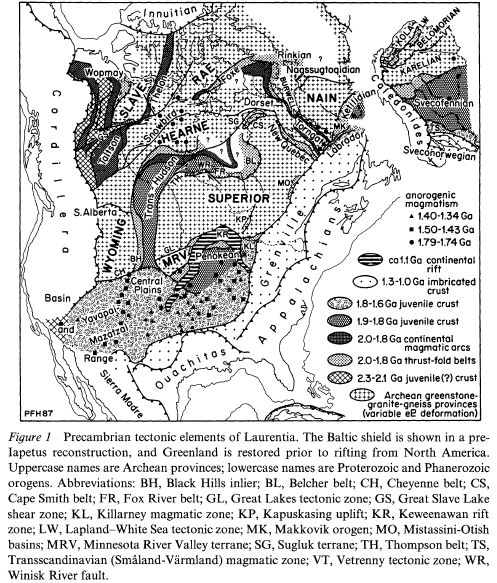
This North American map shows the location of the Superior province, the Penokean orogonic area south of the Superior province and the Midcontinent Rift between the two.

The Penokean Mountain Range formed in the Penokean orogeny 1880 to 1830 million years ago, when an oceanic island arc called the Pembine–Wausau terrane collided with the southern margin of the Superior craton. From 1880 to 1850 million years ago, the region was volcanically active. This volcanism ceased 1850 million years ago when a fragment of Archean crust arrived from the South at the subduction zone. Collision of this Archean crust in the south with the Superior craton in the North caused a period of intense crustal shortening. Rocks of the Pembine–Wassau terrane were thrust up over and onto the Superior craton, forming a mountain range that covered all but the northernmost portion of Lake Superior, crossed parts of three US states (south-central Minnesota, northern Wisconsin, and the Upper Peninsula of Michigan), and continued to the southernmost tip of Ontario, Canada. Loading of the lithosphere by these thrust sheets caused it to flex downwards, forming a foreland basin at around 1850 million years ago in the south and 1835 million years ago in the north. The Rove Formation was deposited in the northern basin. In the southern basin, crustal thickening caused high-grade metamorphism of the sedimentary fill by 1830 million years ago. A series of post-orogenic plutons intruded into the overlying rocks 1830 million years ago; these plutons mark the end of the Penokean orogeny.

==== Sudbury impact ejecta ====
At the base of the Rove Formation, between the Rove and the underlying Gunflint Iron Formation, there is a lateral layer of shocked quartz and feldspar grains found within accretionary lapilli, accreted grain clusters and spherule masses. These pieces of debris indicate that the layer contains hypervelocity impact ejecta. Zircon geochronologic data shows that this layer formed 1878 to 1836 million years ago; the Sudbury Impact event occurred 1,850 ± 1 million years ago. Because of the closeness in dating and the nearness of the crater, the Sudbury Impact event is the likely source for the ejecta; these are the oldest ejecta linked to a specific event on Earth. In the Rove area this layer is about 7.6 m (25 ft) thick; this thin layer very likely represents the catastrophic events of a single day nearly 1,850 million years ago.

Evidence indicates a 16 km (10 mi) diameter meteorite collided with Earth in the current-day vicinity of Sudbury, Ontario, Canada, about 1,850 million years ago. The meteorite vaporized and created a 240 km (150 mi) wide crater (this is the second-largest impact depression on Earth). This impact is 770 km (480 mi) east of the Minnesota-Ontario border of the Rove Formation. Earthquakes shattered the ground hundreds of miles away and within seconds ejecta (cloud of ash, rock fragments, gases and droplets of molten rock) began to spread around the globe. It is estimated that at ground zero the earthquake would have registered 10.2 on the Richter scale. Seas covered the Rove Formation area and the Sudbury impact generated huge tsunamis.

To put the Sudbury meteorite impact in perspective, the Chicxulub impact on the Yucatán Peninsula occurred 66 million years ago from an object perhaps 60% the size of the Sudbury impactor; the results of this impact caused the worldwide extinction of many species (including dinosaurs).

The Sudbury Impact would have had global ramifications; it is conjectured that this caused the end of the iron deposits. The impact fundamentally affected concentrations of dissolved oxygen in the sea; the accumulation of marine sediments (known as banded-iron formations) were almost instantaneously shut down. Banded-iron formations are massive deposits rich in iron oxides; they accumulated at several periods in the Earth's geologic past. One extended episode of banded-iron formation buildup suddenly ended about 1,850 million years ago. In northeastern Minnesota these banded-iron formations lie immediately under the ejecta layer. Minnesota's Iron Range is composed of this layer of banded-iron formation.

Most of the impact layer in the Rove area consists of beccia, a mixture of rock fragments which ripped loose from the sea floor during the earthquakes. The tsunamis jumbled the loosened bedrock and ejecta together; over time this layer was buried by younger sediments, cemented together and fused by molten rock to form a solid layer. Ejecta from the Sudbury Impact was found in May 2007 on the Gunflint Trail in Cook County, Minnesota. Geologists Mark Jirsa and Paul Weiblen from the University of Minnesota took advantage of the burnt-over landscape resulting from the intense, hot Ham Lake fire to explore the newly exposed geology along the Gunflint Trail. Jirsa picked up some rocks which turned out to be ash and debris from the 1,100 km (680 mi) distant impact site; this is the farthest distance that Sudbury detrita has been found.

==== Midcontinent Rift ====
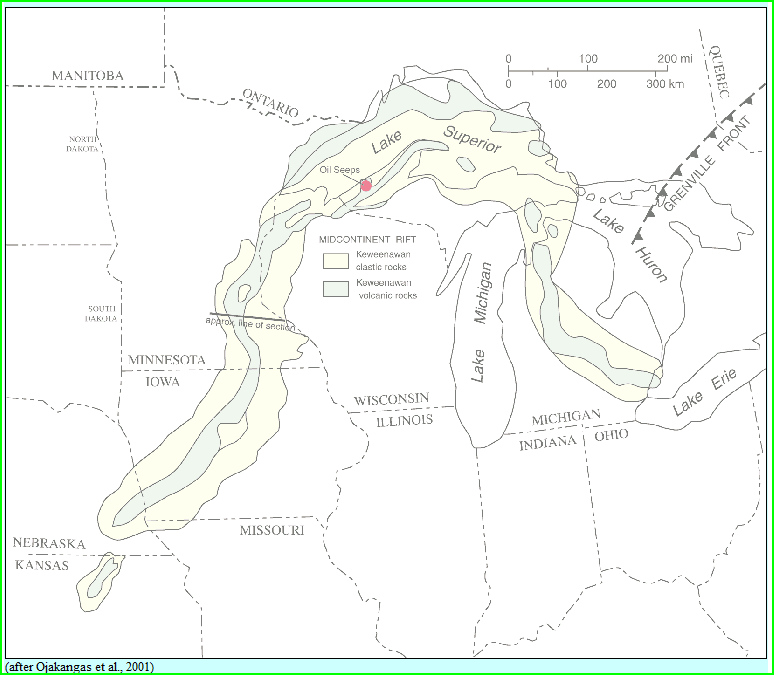
Midcontinent Rift

The Midcontinent Rift (also known as the Keweenawan Rift) began about 1,100 million years ago; it lasted for about 20 million years. After the Penokean Mountains had eroded away, the proto-North American continent nearly split in half along this rift zone. The 2,000 km (1,200 mi) bow-shaped rift extended from northeastern Kansas, through the southeastern corner of Nebraska, diagonally northeast through Iowa, through Minnesota along the current Minnesota-Wisconsin border, arced through the present-day Lake Superior basin and angled southeasterly through Michigan.

The Midcontinent Rift is the largest-known continental rift in the world. The rift began as a hot spot of basaltic magma underneath the Lake Superior region; it extruded layers of lava up to 20 km (12 mi) thick and extending up to 100 km (60 mi) on either side of the rift. The deposited lava along the North Shore of Lake Superior is 7,620 m (5 mi) thick.

This was a fast-spreading rift; the resulting basalts show little interaction with the then-existing rock. These immense volumes of mafic lava were generated in two major pulses, mostly via a hot mantle plume. Along the North Shore of Lake Superior, one can see the solidified lava (igneous rock) most everywhere. In the Rove region the magma didn't reach the surface; it intruded into fractures in the formation and slowly cooled to become diabase (rather than basalt). These solidified bodies are the Pigeon River and Logan Intrusion diabases.

The continent didn't split into two because the Grenville province (a microcontinent) was converging with the proto-North American continent to the east. This convergence applied compressional forces to the rift, preventing the complete splitting apart of the proto-North American continent.

This rift was the last of volcanic or mountain-building activity in present-day Minnesota. The solidified lava flows have sagged, tilted and faulted; this created a basin up to 5,000 m (16,000 ft) deep along the rift zone. Proto-Lake Superior filled the basin.

==== Puckwunge Formation ====
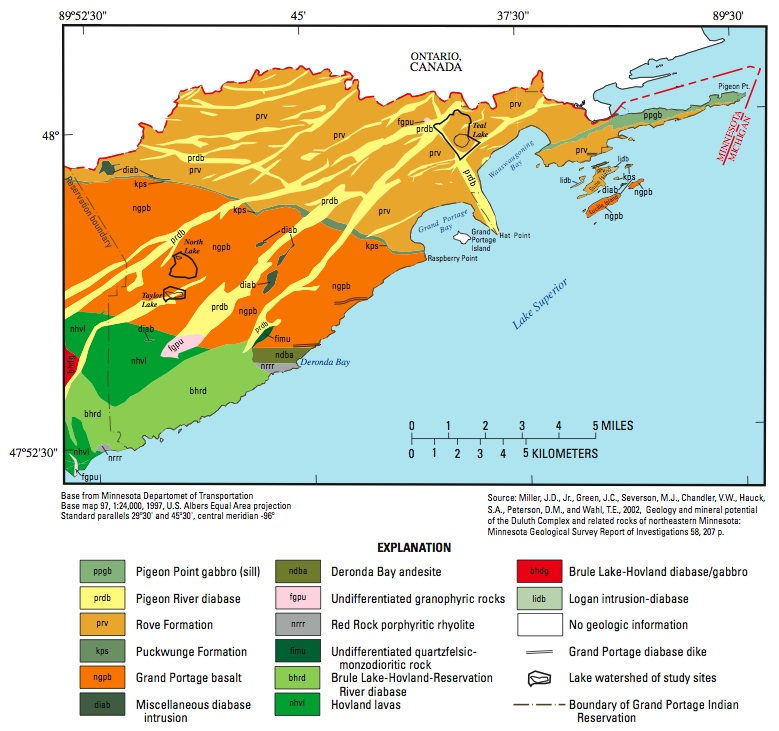
Bedrock geological map of northeastern tip of Minnesota, U.S. The Rove Formation is represented by prv, kps represents the Puckwunge Formation and prdb represents the Pigeon River diabase.

The Puckwunge Formation has buff to grey sandstone which comes from sediments deposited during the early stages of the Midcontinent rift; zircon dating shows a time period of 1200 to 1100 million years ago.

Puckwunge sandstone is exposed along an extremely narrow (feet-wide) band on the southwestern border of the Rove formation. The Puckwunge exposure begins at Raspberry Point within the Grand Portage National Monument on Lake Superior, Cook County, Minnesota, and extends for about 40 km (25 mi) inland to the northwest. The Rove Formation is located to the northeast of the Puckwunge sandstone; none is southwest of the border. The Rove Formation is bisected by several bands of Pigeon River Diabase; these bands are in a west-to-east orientation. The bands of Pigeon River Diabase do extend southwesterly past the Puckwunge Formation.

=== Quaternary Period and glaciation ===
The Quaternary Period began about 2 million years ago and continues today. This is the period of advancing and retreating glaciers. The Rove region has multiple tilted layers of volcanic rocks and easily eroded shale. The more resistant diabase dikes and sills remained, while the softer shales were bulldozed away by the glaciers. These former shale valleys filled with water, forming the many lakes in the region. The character of the slates made them especially well suited for glacial quarrying, much more so than the contiguous sills. A cuesta – a ridge formed by gently tilted sedimentary rock layers – topography had developed and was dominated by major east–west valleys with a few pronounced gaps in the intervening ridges.

The Rainy Lobe of the Wisconsin glaciation was the most recent of the glaciation events, and it retreated about 10,000 years ago. Glacial scratches and grooves in Rove rocks indicate a north or somewhat east-of-north glacial movement. This direction is transverse to the general trend on the valleys and ridges. The lakes in the Rove Formation area are unique from other well-known linear bedrock lakes in North America because their long axes lie transverse to the general movement of the glaciers.

When continental glaciers moved over the Rove Formation area, the ice was a hundreds of meters thick and its surface sloped gently southward from the Patrician center to the north. The base of the ice sheet encountered the cuesta topography relief of a few hundred feet. Because the ice over the valleys would be thicker than the ice over the ridges, obstructed extrusion flow would operate and resulted in the removal of the easily quarried slates of the valleys. The ridges would not be appreciably eroded, partly because the ice would be thinner over the ridges and therefore less plastic, and partly because of the resistance of the diabase to both quarrying and abrasion by the ice.

The weight of the ice sheet compressed the land and created depressions. As the glacier retreated, the weight and pressure were relieved from the surface of the land and the land rebounded; the rebound process continues, and is estimated to be 100 m (330 ft).

== Present-day topography ==
In Ontario, the shales and greywackes from the Rove Formation of the Animikie Group are overlain by a 60 m (200 ft) cap of diabase. This diabase cap is a sill remnant, and most of the diabase is covered by a considerable thickness of mineral soil. The mesa at Russell Point (about 16 km (10 mi) south of Thunder Bay) is a Logan sill of diabase over the softer Rove Formation metasediments. It is one of the many flat-topped, steep-sided mesas along Lake Superior's northwestern shore south of Thunder Bay that are collectively known as the Nor'Wester Mountains.

In Minnesota, the Rove Formation area shows a relationship of bedrock to topography, with its valley-and-ridge landscape. There are several series of steep, east–west oriented valleys which were created by the erosion of the exposed shale. The diabase-capped ridges between the valleys slope gently to the south (4° to 15° from the horizontal); the northern faces are precipitous; they rise 60 to 140 m (200 to 460 ft) above deep, cold lakes, creating an asymmetrical cross-section profile. The asymmetrical cross section of the ridges is the result of bands of massive, poorly jointed rock alternating with highly jointed rock units. The valleys contain glacially quarried bedrock lakes; they are also asymmetrical in cross section because of the same structural elements which control the ridge shapes. Most of the lakes show an asymmetrical bottom configuration, showing a steep subaqueous slope on the south shore. The northern-facing cliffs provide the habitat for a few species of endangered flora. The Rove Formation has landscape features that are not found elsewhere in Minnesota.

Most of the valleys are occupied by chains of elongate lakes, many of which are bordered by solid rock on all sides. Many of the east–west valleys terminate abruptly at either one or both ends when the bordering sills merge. The elevation of the lakes ranges from Rose Lake's 465 m (1,526 ft) to Loon Lake's 532 m (1,745 ft) above sea level. Lakes on the opposite sides of a single ridge may differ in surface elevation by as much as 60 m (200 ft). Many of the rock-bound lakes have a depth of about 30 m (100 ft); a few are deeper than 61 m (200 ft).

A topographic map shows that the majority of the interconnected complex of tightly packed lakes with their valley-and-ridge landscape is primarily in Minnesota; the border of the landscape is the Canada–US border. This border is composed of the Pigeon River, and these Rove Formation lakes (going east to west): South Fowl, North Fowl, Moose, Mountain, Watap, Rose, South, Little North and Gunflint. The border runs approximately through the center of the lengths of these lakes. The only Rove-typical east–west oriented lakes lying in Ontario are Arrow and North lakes.

The preglacial drainage pattern was controlled by the rock structure. Ver Steeg reconstructed a preglacial drainage pattern that shows major streams flowing east in the slate belts. Short tributaries and short north–south segments of the major streams cut across ridges which formed small gaps that are still present.

The Laurentian Continental Divide is within the formation. Between North Lake, Ontario, and South Lake, Minnesota, is a low saddle of land right on the border; this is the divide. North Lake drains into the Rainy River and then to Hudson Bay. South Lake drains into the Pigeon River and then to Lake Superior.

Topsoils are thin and poor because the glaciers had abraded down to the bedrock. The soils are clayey silt.

== Endangered flora ==
Topographically this is the Rove Slate Bedrock Complex Landtype Association. The sedimentary and diabase rocks are calcareous; they produce a more basic, nutrient-rich soil compared to the poorer soils typical of the Canadian shield. The Royal River drains Royal Lake [which is about 1.2 km (3,900 ft) east of South Fowl Lake] into John Lake, both in Minnesota. The relatively rich soils, particularly in the Royal River drainage area, along with steep, moist, north-facing cliffs provide the habitat for these rare plants. For over a century this landtype association has been recognized as being ecologically and botanically unique; it harbors a rare assemblage of plants, including the rarest plants in Minnesota. Virtually all of the known sensitive plant species in this landscape association occur on the north side of the cliffs or in the Royal River drainage.

Six vascular plants are unique in that they are at the extreme edge of their range or are disjunct from the main range of their species. They are the Maidenhair spleenwort (Asplenium trichomanes L.), in Minnesota six small populations of 20 to 40 plants have been found in the Rove area; Ross's (or Short) sedge (Carex rossii), only three populations are known to exist in the Rove area; Large-leaved sandwort (Moehringia macrophylla or Arenaria macrophylla), evidence indicates that this is a very rare species with limited distribution and restrictive environmental needs; Sticky locoweed (Oxytropis borealis var. viscida), is restricted to a single cliff in Cook County; Encrusted saxifrage (Saxifraga paniculata ssp. neogaea), 11 populations are known to exist in the Rove formation; and Smooth Woodsia (Woodsia glabella), there are small, isolated populations in the Rove Formation.

During two sensitive plant surveys conducted in June and July 2003, and July 2004, a Superior National Forest sensitive plant, Canada Yew (Taxus canadensis), was found; and a state-listed species of concern, Blunt-fruited sweet cicely (Osmorhiza depauperata), has only four populations within 30 km (19 mi) of each other. Minnesota's Department of Natural Resources lists these vascular plants as being threatened: Rocky Mountain woodsia (Physematium scopulinum ssp. laurentiana), there are few isolated populations in the formation; and Holboell's rock-cress (Boechera retrofracta or Arabis holboellii var. retrofracta), rare in Ontario and Minnesota. Minnesota's Department of Natural Resources lists the Nodding saxifrage (Saxifraga cernua) as endangered, one source refers it to being "very rare" and that Cook County has Minnesota's single colony with about a dozen plants – the entire population occupies less than a 1 m^{2} (1 yd^{2}) – so it is vulnerable to singular events which would alter its habitat.
