= Gunflint Range =

Iron ore deposit in Minnesota, United States and Ontario, Canada

Coordinates: 48.184°N 89.835°W

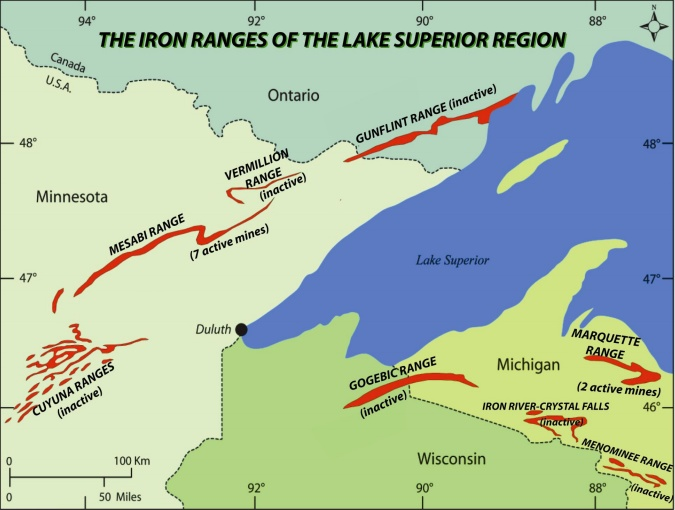
Lake Superior Iron Ranges

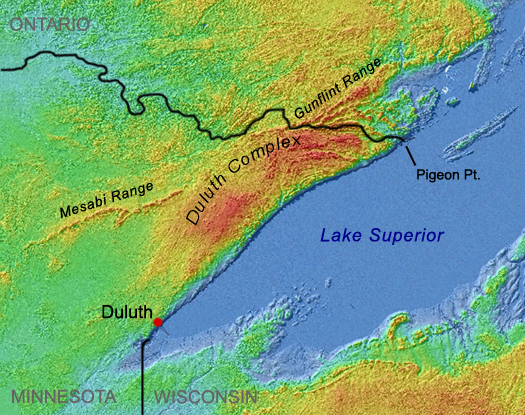
Shaded-relief image showing Duluth Complex arcing from Duluth to Pigeon Point, interrupting and splitting the Mesabi and Gunflint Ranges

The Gunflint Range is an iron ore deposit in northern Minnesota in the United States and Northwestern Ontario, Canada. The range extends from the extreme northern portion of Cook County, Minnesota into the Thunder Bay District, Ontario.

The Gunflint Iron Formation is a continuation of the Mesabi Range to the southwest. The two have been separated by the intrusion of the Duluth Gabbro complex. The iron deposit is a banded iron formation of the Early Proterozoic Animikie Group. The Gunflint Iron Formation is overlain by "brecciated and complexly deformed iron formations", which in turn is overlain by ejecta from the "Sudbury meteorite impact event." This Sudbury Impact Layer is overlain by the Rove Formation. Stromatolite structures are evident within the Gunflint Iron Formation.

The cherts of the Gunflint (the Gunflint Chert) are noted for containing Precambrian microfossils.

== See also ==
- Midcontinent Rift System
- Paulson Mine
- Cuyuna Range
- Vermilion Range (Minnesota)
- Gogebic Range
- Marquette Iron Range
