= Animikie Group =

North American geologic group

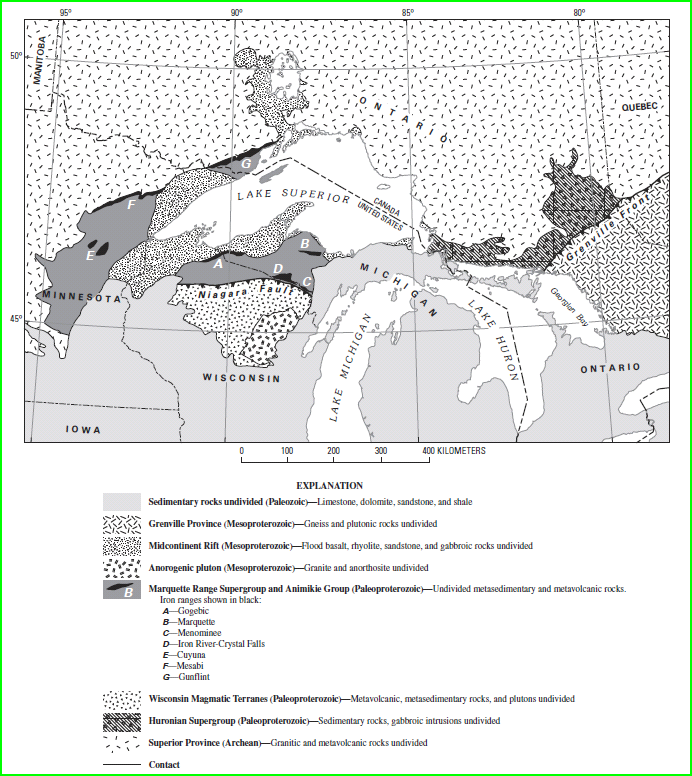
Iron Range areas marked include: G-Gunflint Iron Range, F-Mesabi Iron Range, E-Cuyuna Iron Range

The Animikie Group is a geologic group composed of sedimentary and metasedimentary rock, having been originally deposited between 2,500 and 1,800 million years ago during the Paleoproterozoic era, within the Animikie Basin. This group of formations is geographically divided into the Gunflint Range, the Mesabi and Vermilion ranges, and the Cuyuna Range. On the map, the Animikie Group is the dark gray northeast-trending belt which ranges from south-central Minnesota, U.S., up to Thunder Bay, Ontario, Canada. The Gunflint Iron Range is the linear black formation labeled G, the Mesabi Iron Range is the jagged black linear formation labeled F, and Cuyuna Iron Range is the two black spots labeled E. The gabbro of the Duluth Complex, intruded during the formation of the Midcontinent Rift, separates the Mesabi and Gunflint iron ranges; it is shown by the speckled area wrapping around the western end of Lake Superior.

Banded-iron formations are iron formations which formed about 2,000 million years ago and were first described in the Lake Superior region. Sediments associated with the last stage of the Great Lakes tectonic zone contain banded-iron formations. These sediments were deposited for two hundred million years and extend intermittently along roughly the same trend as the Great Lakes tectonic zone, from Minnesota into eastern Ontario, Canada, and through upper Wisconsin and Michigan. They are characterized by bands of iron compounds and chert. Enough oxygen had accumulated in seawater so that dissolved iron was oxidized; iron reacts with oxygen to form compounds that precipitate out – including hematite, limonite and siderite. These iron compounds precipitated from the seawater in varying proportions with chert, producing banded-iron formations. These iron formations are abundant in the Lake Superior region. The Sudbury Impact event occurred 1,850 million years ago; it is theorized that this caused the end of the banded-iron deposits. The results of the impact affected concentrations of dissolved oxygen in the sea; the accumulation of banded-iron formations suddenly ended 1,850 million years ago.

The Gunflint Range consists of a basal conglomerate, then the Gunflint Iron formation and the Gunflint Chert with the Rove Formation deposited on top. The Mesabi Range consists of the basal Pokegama Quartzite layer, then the Biwabik Iron Formation with the Virginia Formation deposited on top. The Vermilion Range consists of the basal Ely Greenstone, then the Soudan Iron formation with various granites on top. The Cuyuna Range consists of the basal North Range group, then the Trommald Formation with the Thomson Formation deposited on top.

== Age, location and size ==
The Animikie Group sediments were deposited between 2,500 and 1,800 million years ago, in the Animikie Basin. Deposition of sediments began after the Algoman orogeny and continued through the Great Lakes tectonic zone rupture from 2,200 to 1,850 million years ago.

The Animikie Group formations are in east-central and northeastern Minnesota, and the Thunder Bay District of Northern Ontario; they are geographically divided into the Gunflint Range, the Mesabi and Vermilion ranges, and the Cuyuna Range. The Animikie Basin was an extensional basin which developed over a basement consisting of the 2,750- to 2,600-million-year-old Superior province to the north and the 3,600-million-year-old Minnesota River Valley subprovince to the south. The extension was caused by the east-northeast–trending Great Lakes tectonic zone; it separates the Superior province from the Minnesota River Valley subprovince. The sediments were deformed, metamorphosed and intruded by the plutonic rocks of the 1860 ± 50-million-year-old Penokean orogeny.

The rocks of the Animikie Basin form a sequence up to 10 km (6.2 mi) thick and show a complete transition from a stable shelf environment to deep-water conditions. Irregularities in the basement influenced the thickness of the sequence. The 700 km (430 mi) by 400 km (250 mi) basin is an elongated oval parallel to and straddling the Great Lakes tectonic zone.

== Development of Animikie Basin ==
Twenty-seven hundred million years ago the Algoman orogeny formed mountains; these bare mountains eroded for several hundred million years to a broad level peneplain. A sea invaded central Minnesota and extended eastward through northern Wisconsin and the Upper Peninsula of Michigan. Sediments composed of quartz-rich sand were deposited along the shoreline of this sea; these were succeeded by thick iron-rich layers and eventually kilometers of mud and muddy sand. The deposition of sedimentary strata on top of the Archean basement formed the Animikie Group.

The next tectonic event was the Great Lakes tectonic zone which began with compression caused by the collision of the Superior province and the Minnesota River Valley subprovince during the Algoman orogeny about 2,700 million years ago; it continued as a pulling apart (extensional) rift from 2,450 to 2,100 million years ago, followed by a second compression which deformed the rocks in the Lake Superior region during the Penokean orogeny which lasted from 1,900 to 1,850 million years ago. The first deposits occurred during the initial stages of extension of the Great Lakes tectonic zone in the continental crust. As the crust expanded it thinned, and magma was intruded through fissures in the thinned crust. Sedimentation stopped during this transitional period because the elevation was now above sea level. During later stages, the spreading center was adding oceanic crust – which is heavier than continental crust – so the area subsided, seas returned, and the second layer of sediments were deposited unconformably on the basin fill.

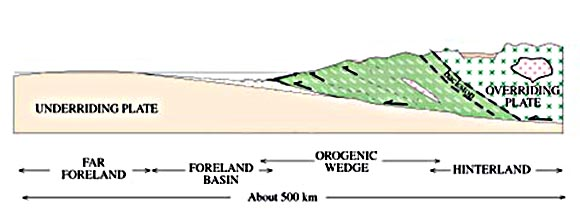
During the Penokean orogeny the Minnesota River Valley subprovince overrode the Superior province.

The third tectonic event was the Penokean orogeny which is dated 1,850 million years ago. The intense, northward-directed compression folded the shale and greywacke of the southernmost unit – the Thomson Formation – and metamorphosed the shale into slate. The Animikie strata on the Gunflint and Mesabi ranges were far enough away so they escaped this deformation and metamorphism; they contain some of the oldest unmetamorphosed sedimentary deposits in the world.

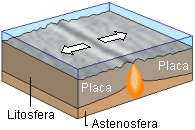
Hotspot causing rifting of tectonic plates

About 1,100 million years ago a fourth tectonic event occurred in the Lake Superior region. A hotspot of magma from the Earth's mantle beneath present-day Lake Superior rose, causing the crust to dome and break apart. This zone of crustal thinning and fracturing is the Midcontinent Rift System; it extends in a boomerang shape for over 2,200 km (1,400 mi) from northeastern Kansas northward through Iowa, under the Twin Cities of Minnesota, beneath Lake Superior, and then south through the eastern Upper Peninsula of Michigan and beneath the central Lower Peninsula of Michigan. As the crust was being stretched thin and more magma flowed out from below, the center of the rift was continuously subsiding. The vast quantities of rising magma created a vacuum under the crust, the weight of the solidified magma on the surface caused the crust to subside into that vacuum so the edges of the rift tilted toward the center. The rifting stopped after a few million years; one reason could be that the Grenville orogeny stopped the rift process when that collision occurred. Subsidence continued for several million years after the lava flows had ceased; immense volumes of sediments – sand, gravel and mud – were eroded off the barren landscape into the still-sinking basin along the rift axis. As much as 8 km (5.0 mi) of sedimentary rocks accumulated in the center before the sinking stopped and the region stabilized. A north-northeast trending branch of the Midcontinent Rift System separated the Animikie Basin into two distinct segments; the present-day Animikie Group and the Marquette Range Supergroup; the historical name for the Marquette Range Supergroup is the Animikie Series.

== Banded-iron formations ==
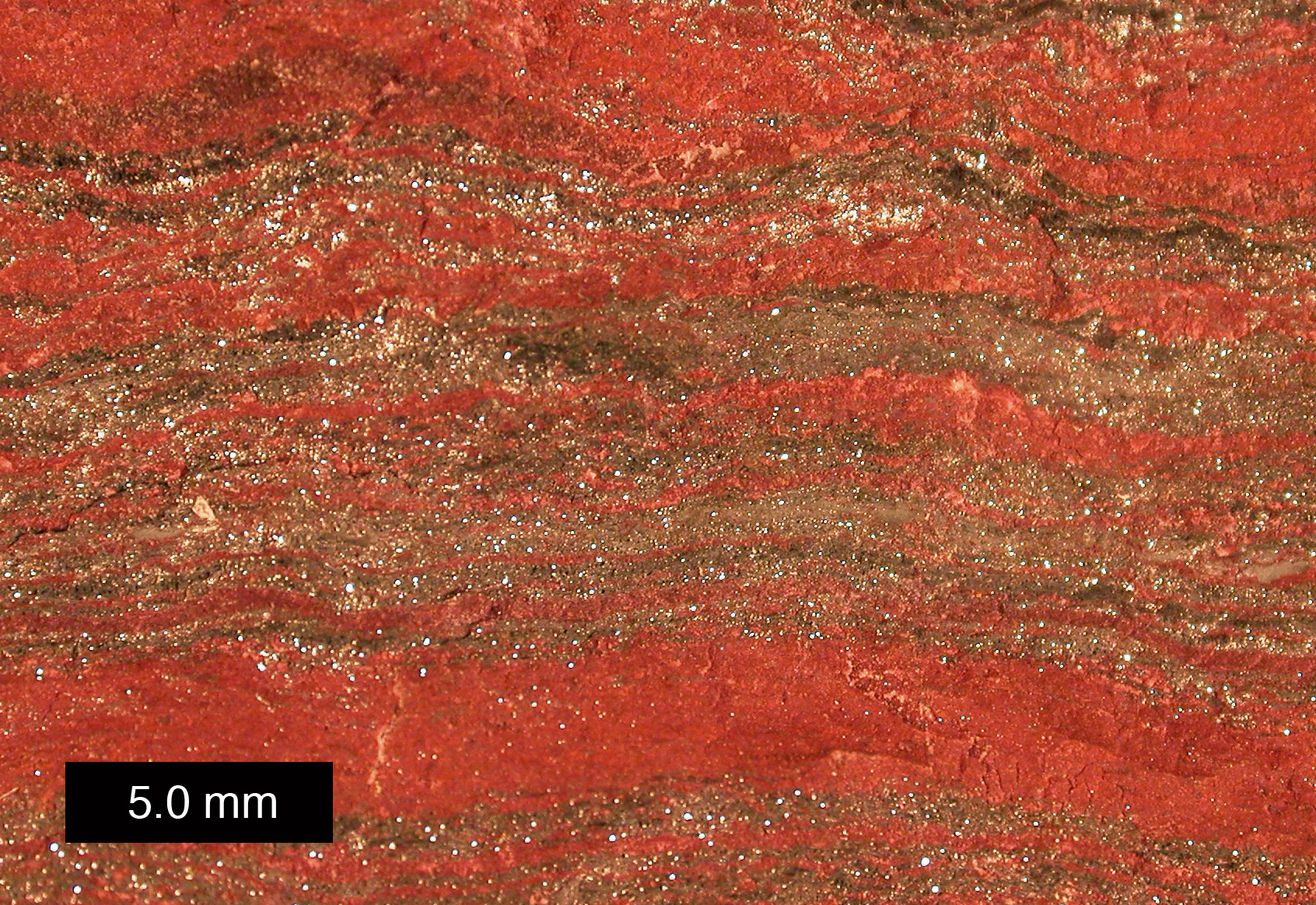
Hematitic banded-iron formation specimen from Michigan's Upper Peninsula; Scale bar is 5.0 mm

Oceanic sediments associated with the last stage of the Great Lakes tectonic zone contain the banded-iron formations. Banded-iron formations are iron formations which formed about 2,000 million years ago and were first described in the Lake Superior region. They are characterized by interlayers – bands – of iron minerals and chert (quartz). These sediments were laid down for two hundred million years and extend intermittently along roughly the same trend as the Great Lakes tectonic zone, from Minnesota into eastern Canada, and through upper Wisconsin and Michigan.

=== Change in atmospheric oxygen levels ===
Banded-iron sediments record the introduction of abundant free oxygen into earth's atmosphere. Microbial life played an important role in changing atmospheric conditions by releasing free oxygen as a waste product of photosynthesis. Free oxygen was taken up by elements with strong affinities for it – hydrogen, carbon and iron. Evidence for the change in oxygen levels is that the sediments of the earlier Archean are dark brown and black caused by unoxidized carbon, iron sulfide, and other elements and compounds. As oxygen levels increased in the atmosphere and oceans, the sediments changed. In the late Archean, sediments went through a transitional stage with the banded-iron formations; after this transition they demonstrate an oxygen-rich environment – shown by iron oxide-stained siltstones or mudstones called red beds.

Enough oxygen had accumulated in seawater so that dissolved iron – which had earlier eroded from the surrounding land – was oxidized. Oxygenated water has low levels of dissolved iron because iron reacts with oxygen to form compounds that precipitate out; the compounds include hematite (Fe_{2}O_{3}), limonite (Fe_{2}O_{3}·2H_{2}O) and siderite (FeCO_{3}). These iron compounds precipitated from the sea water in varying proportions with chert, producing banded-iron formations. Banded-iron formations occur in several ranges around the margins of this basin, five of which contained sufficient concentrations of iron to be economically mined. These banded-iron formations have been one of the world's greatest sources of iron ore since mining began in the area during the late 19th century. Major iron formations in different parts of the basin represent either nearly contemporaneous shelf sedimentation on either side of the main basin, or deposits formed simultaneously in isolated sub-basins of the main basin.

=== Effect of the Sudbury Impact on atmospheric oxygen levels ===
A 25 to 70 cm (9.8 to 27.6 in) thick lateral layer between the metasedimentary Gunflint Iron Formation and overlying Rove Formation, and between the Biwabik Iron Formation and overlying Virginia Formation has evidence that the layer contains hypervelocity impact ejecta. Radiometric dating reveals that this layer was deposited between 1,878 and 1,836 million years ago. The Sudbury Impact event – which occurred 650 to 875 km (404 to 544 mi) to the east 1,850 ± 1 million years ago – is the likely ejecta source, making these the oldest ejecta linked to a specific impact. Additional evidence indicates a 16 km (10 mi) diameter meteorite collided with Earth in the current-day vicinity of Sudbury, Ontario, Canada. The meteorite vaporized and created a 240 km (150 mi) wide crater. Earthquakes shattered the ground hundreds of kilometers away and within seconds ejecta (cloud of ash, rock fragments, gases and droplets of molten rock) began to spread around the globe. It is estimated that at ground zero the earthquake would have registered 10.2 on the Richter magnitude scale.

To put the Sudbury meteorite impact in perspective, the Chicxulub impact on the Yucatán Peninsula occurred 66 million years ago with the impact of a 16.5 km (10.3 mi) diameter comet. The kinetic energy from this impact probably generated earthquakes registering 13 on the Richter scale. The results of this impact caused the worldwide extinction of many species (including dinosaurs). The Sudbury Impact would have also had global ramifications; it is conjectured that this caused the end of the banded-iron deposits. The results of the impact fundamentally affected concentrations of dissolved oxygen in the sea; the accumulation of marine sediments (the banded-iron formations) were almost instantaneously shut down and banded-iron formation buildups suddenly ended about 1,850 million years ago. In northeastern Minnesota these iron-banded formations lie immediately under the ejecta layer.

One use of the impact layer is as a precise timeline that ties together well-known stratigraphic sequences of the various geographically separated iron ranges. The Sudbury Impact layer lies at a horizon that records a significant change in the character of sediments across the region. The layer marks the end of a major period of banded-iron formation deposition that was succeeded by deposition of fine clastic rocks – commonly black shales.

=== End of deposition ===
Sedimentation styles of the passive margin changed as deposition came to a close. The sedimentary environment recorded near the end changed from deep water shales derived from Archean rocks to coarser clastic rocks derived from a younger Proterozoic source. This change is interpreted to be from the Pembine-Wausau island arc as it closed in from the south just before its collision during the Penokean orogeny. Sediments shedding off the island arc settled on top of the previously deposited sequences.

== Formations within Animikie Group ==
=== Gunflint Range ===
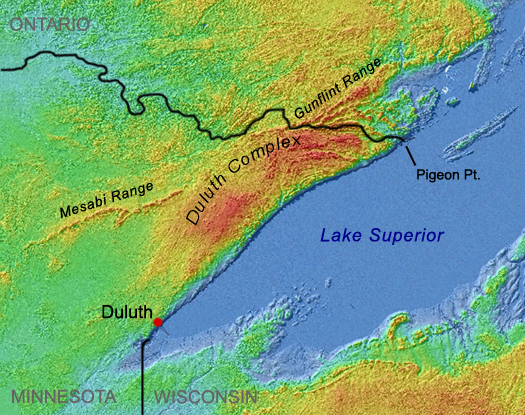
The Duluth Complex splits the Mesabi and Gunflint ranges.

The Gunflint Range is a mountain range in northeastern Minnesota, U.S., and western Ontario, Canada. The Gunflint and Mesabi ranges form a belt extending from the upper Mississippi River to the extreme northeast part of Minnesota and into Canada to Thunder Bay. The two ranges are separated by the 1,099-million-year-old Duluth Complex which was formed during the Midcontinent Rift.

The Gunflint Iron Formation is 1,878 ± 2 million years old. It lies on top of a basal conglomerate, unlike the Biwabik Iron Formation which was deposited on top of the Pokegama Quartzite in the Mesabi Range, and the Cuyuna Iron Formation which was deposited on top of the Mille Lacs and North ranges. It is 150 km (93 mi) long, less than 8 km (5.0 mi) wide, and 135 to 170 m (443 to 558 ft) thick. This iron formation lies in a northeasterly-trending belt; most of it lies in Ontario.

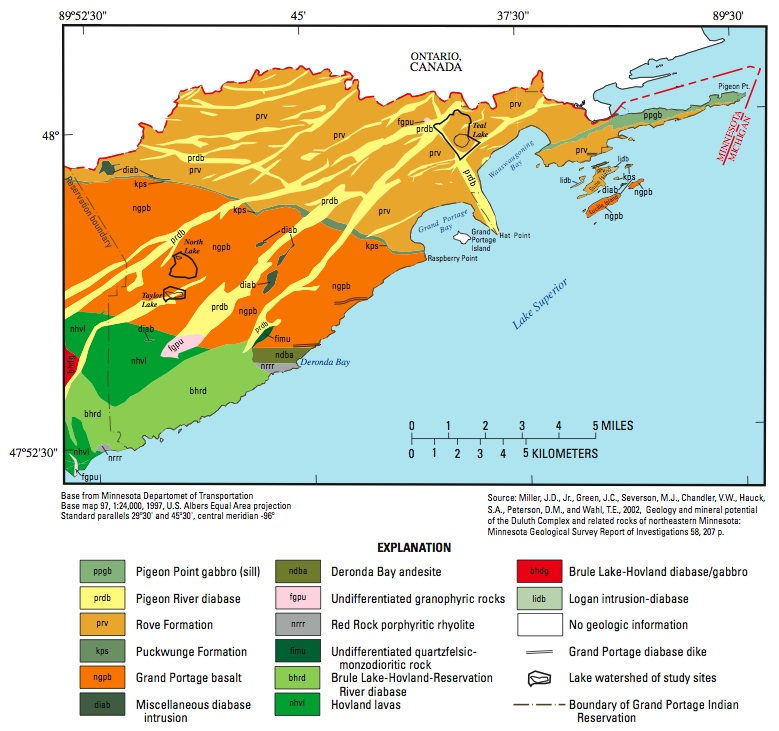
Rove formation represented by prv

The upper sedimentary layer is the 1,800- to 1,600-million-year-old Rove Formation. The seas and laid down the shales, slates and mudstones of the Rove Formation. Because the formation is on the northern part of the Animikie Basin these rocks escaped the crustal deformation from the Penokean orogeny that characterizes the equivalent strata of the Thomson Formation; this left the Rove Formation unmetamorphosed and lying flat. These are some of the oldest undeformed and unmetamorphosed sedimentary rocks in North America. The dikes and sills within the Rove Formation were intruded during the Midcontinent Rift.

=== Mesabi Range ===
The Mesabi Range is over 320 km (200 mi) long and less than 16 km (9.9 mi) wide – its typical width is 4 km (2.5 mi) – and 110 to 240 m (360 to 790 ft) thick. Its natural ore is hematite- or geothite-rich leached iron formation; natural ores contain up to 50% iron and less than 10% silica. These thick sedimentary layers contain millions of tons of iron and minor ores which have been mined in the Great Lakes region since before the turn of the 20th century. Sedimentation ended when the Penokean orogeny began 1,850 million years ago.

The three different formations exposed along the Mesabi Iron Range were deposited along the leading edge of a foredeep basin – the Animikie Basin – which transgressed north over the Archean craton during the Penokean orogeny. Deposition of the basal Pokegama Quartzite, the medial Biwabik Iron Formation and the upper Virginia Formation's sediments represent near-shore, shelf and slope environments, respectively. These three layers were formed 2,500 to 1,600 million years ago.

Pokegama Quartzite occupies the lowest level of the Mesabi Range sequence and is younger than 2,500 million years old. It contains shale, siltstone and sandstone, which were deposited in a flat environment of the sea that covered the Archean surface. It is 0 to 153 m (0 to 502 ft) thick, with an average of 60 m (200 ft).

The 1,900- to 1,850-million-year-old Biwabik Iron Formation is a narrow belt of iron-rich strata that extends east-northeast for 200 km (120 mi); its thickness varies from 60 to 600 m (200 to 1,970 ft), its average may be 305 m (1,001 ft). It has four primary subdivisions: the Lower Cherty (which was deposited upon the Pokegama Quartzite), the Lower Slatey, the Upper Cherty and the Upper Slaty (which the Virginia Formation rests upon). The two ore-producing layers are the Upper and Lower Cherty subdivisions; cherts make up the bulk of the formation. The east end of the Biwabik Iron Formation was metamorphosed by the heat of the Duluth Complex.

The 1,850-million-year-old Virginia Formation is the sedimentary layer on top of the Biwabik Iron Range and forms the footwall of the 1,100-million-year-old Duluth Complex in the Ely – Hoyt Lakes region. The Virginia formation consists of black to dark gray argillite, which does not crop out in natural exposures.

=== Vermilion Range ===
Anticline

The Vermilion Range is north of the Mesabi Iron Range; it is 154 km (96 mi) long and ranges from 3 to 30 km (1.9 to 18.6 mi) wide. Its basal unit is the Ely Greenstone layer. Ely Greenstone consists of igneous rocks which were metamorphosed by the gabbro of the Duluth Complex. The Ely Greenstone is a belt consisting chiefly of metamorphosed volcanic rocks which have been deformed so that original bedding stands nearly vertical. In the Soudan area the Ely Greenstone has been tightly folded and slightly overturned southward into the Tower-Soudan anticline, and bedding is inclined 70-80° to the north. The volcanic rocks of the Ely Greenstone are divided into a lower and upper sequence; the upper and lower volcanic sequences are separated by the Soudan Iron Formation – a 50 to 3,000 m (160 to 9,840 ft) thick unit that is transitional with the Ely Greenstone – which consists chiefly of banded iron-formation. The Soudan Iron Formation is in the western part of the Vermilion Range. It is in narrow belts, and consists of cherts, hematite, magnetite and small amounts of pyrite. The narrow belts trend east–northeast with the widest part to the southwest. These iron-bearing rocks are of sedimentary origin which overlie an igneous series. The iron formation is tightly folded with greenstone. and is overlain by granites in the Vermilion, Trout, Burntside, Basswood and Saganaga lake areas.

=== Cuyuna Range ===
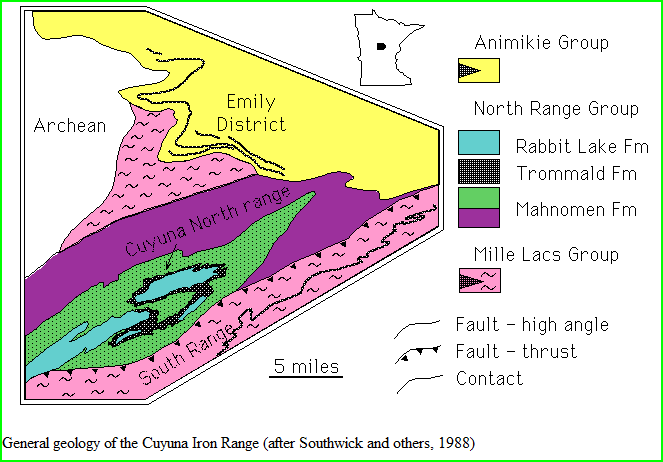
Constituent parts of Cuyuna Iron Range

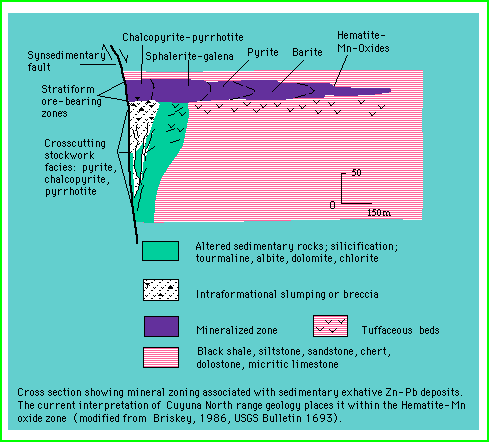
Cross section of Cuyuna North Range

The Cuyuna Iron Range is southwest of the Mesabi Range in east-central Minnesota; it is 110 km (68 mi) by 32 km (20 mi) of tightly folded iron formations. Its thickness ranges from 0 to 135 m (0 to 443 ft). Two sequences – the Mille Lacs and North ranges – underlie the southern part of the Animike Group. The Mille Lacs Group is more than 2,197 ± 39 million years old.

The North Range Group is the basal unit for the Cuyuna Range. It is divided into three structural units: South Range (The rocks of the South Range are assigned to the Mille Lacs group.), North Range and the Emily District each with its own characteristic stratigraphy and structure. The rocks of the South and North ranges are separated by a major north-verging thrust fault, and both are overlain unconformably by the Emily District. The rocks of the North Range – assigned to the North Range Group, – are divided into three formations, the Mahnomen, Trommald and Rabbit Lake. The North Range of the Cuyuna Range was regionally metamorphosed during the Penokean orogeny, which peaked between 1,870 and 1,850 million years ago. The iron ore of the Cuyuna is a Lake Superior-type iron-formation similar to other iron formations in the region.

The Mahnomen Formation has a lower member, which lacks iron oxide components, and an upper member dominated by beds of iron oxide argillite and lean iron-formation interlayered with non-iron oxide argillite, siltstone and quartzose sandstone. The Trommald Formation – the principal iron formation of the North Range – is a chemically precipitated unit. This formation is 14 to 150 m (46 to 492 ft) thick and is composed of carbonate-silicate iron formations and associated manganese oxide deposits. The iron oxidised to form hematite and goethite. The uppermost Rabbit Lake Formation has a lower member of black mudstone inserted with beds of iron formation and units of volcanogenic origin; and an upper member of slate, carbonaceous mudstone, greywacke and thin units of iron-rich strata.

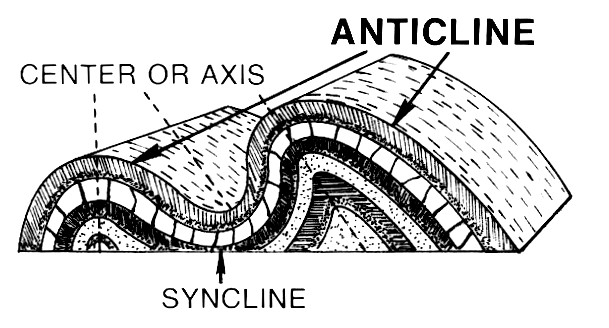
Syncline and anticlines

The top sedimentary layer is the Thomson Formation which was deposited 1,880 to 1,870 million years ago and deformed by the Penokean orogeny 1,850 million years ago. The formation contains folded and metamorphosed greywacke, siltstone, mudstone and slate which were originally deposited in the sea as horizontal beds of mud and sand; the Penokean orogeny subjected the rocks to intense compression from the south. This folded the layers into east–west trending anticlines and synclines, and compressed the muddy beds into slate, a metamorphic rock. The Thomson Formation has steeply dipping beds of greywacke, siltstone and slate. Several basaltic dikes, from the lava of the Midcontinent Rift period, cut across the Thomson Formation slate and greywackes. Most of these dikes trend in a northeasterly direction; they represent magma that rose in fissures in the crust.

== Summary of Huronian and Marquette Range supergroups ==
The Huronian and Marquette Range supergroups are similar sedimentary groups to the Animikie Group; all three are in the Great Lakes region. Rifting of continental plates create sedimentary basins; the largest of these basins in the Great Lakes area are the Animikie Group in Minnesota, the Marquette Range Supergroup in northern Michigan and Wisconsin, and the Huronian Supergroup in eastern Ontario.

=== Huronian Supergroup ===
The Huronian Supergroup on the north shore of Lake Huron in Ontario overlies an Archean basement. On the map it is the formation north of both Lake Huron and the Grenville Front Tectonic Zone. Huronian sedimentary rocks form a 300 km (190 mi) east–west fold belt and reach a thickness of 12 km (7.5 mi) near Lake Huron. Deposition of sediments began 2,450 to 2,219 million years ago and continued until 1,850 to 1,800 million years ago when the rocks were deformed and metamorphosed during the Penokean orogeny. The supergroup's sedimentary layers are divided into lower and upper sequences. The lower sequence is subdivided into the Elliot Lake, Hough Lake and Quirke Lake groups; the upper sequence is the Cobalt Group. The lower sequences were deposited in a continental rift basin and the upper sequence was deposited in a stable passive margin.

=== Marquette Range Supergroup ===
The Marquette Range Supergroup also overlies an Archean basement. Originally termed the Animikie Series, it was proposed to be renamed in 1970 to avoid confusion with the Animikie Group in Ontario and Minnesota. On the map it is the dark grey area south of Lake Superior with four iron ranges shown. This supergroup consists of the Chocolay, Menominee, Baraga and Paint River groups, in descending order of age. The Chocolay Group – up to 160 m (520 ft) thick – is a shallow-marine layer which was deposited on the Archean basement; deposition in the Chocolay Group began 2,207 ± 5 million years ago and ended 2,115 ± 5 million years ago. The Menominee Group is a foredeep deposit whose layers were deposited in second-order basins created by oblique subduction of the continental margin, rather than in basins formed on a rifting margin. The upper Baraga Group represents deeper marine basins resulting from increased subsidence and continued collision. Deposition continued until 1,850 million years ago when the Penokean orogeny began.

== See also ==
- Stromatolite
