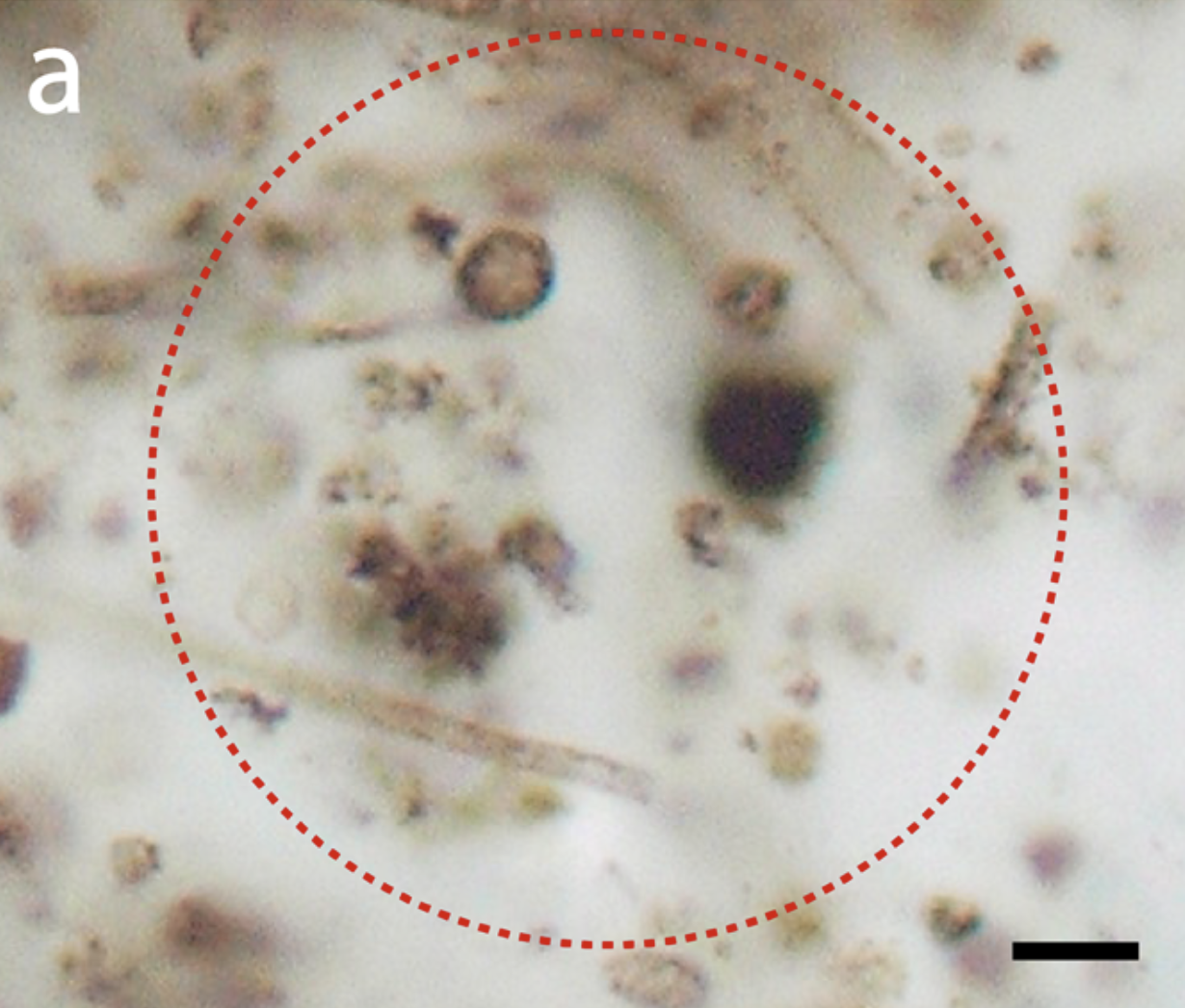
- Gunflintia from the Gunflint Chert

Scientific classification
- Domain: Bacteria
- Kingdom: Bacillati
- Phylum: Cyanobacteriota
- Class: incertae sedis
- Genus: †Gunflintia

Species
- †Gunflintia barghoornii P.K.Maithy; †Gunflintia magna P.K.Maithy

= Gunflintia =

Gunflintia Temporal range: Proterozoic–Cambrian

Extinct genus of cyanobacteria

Gunflintia is an extinct genus of cyanobacteria that once existed in what is now Canada and Australia. It was about five micrometres wide, and is known for being one of the first oxygen-producing cyanobacteria, which helped raise oxygen levels in the atmosphere, making Earth more habitable for other oxygen-using organisms. It is also one of the most common fossils in the Gunflint chert.
