= Vermilion Range (Minnesota) =

Iron ore deposit in Minnesota

Coordinates: 47°51′N 92°4′W

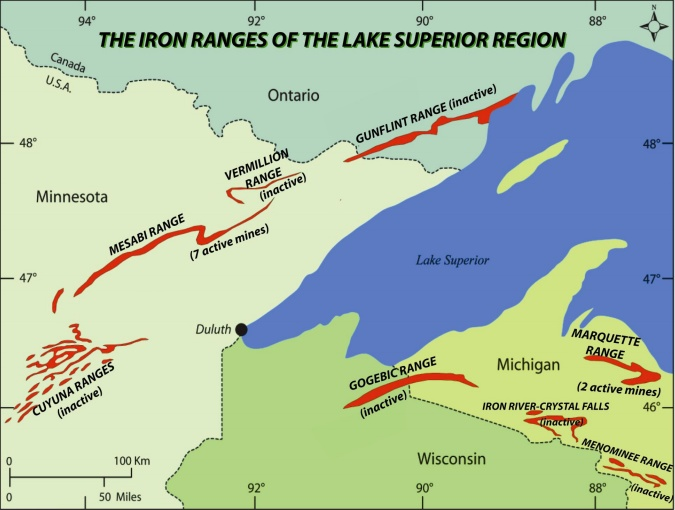
Lake Superior Iron Ranges

The Vermilion Range exists between Tower, Minnesota and Ely, Minnesota, and contains significant deposits of iron ore. Together with the Mesabi, Gunflint, and Cuyuna ranges, these four constitute the Iron Ranges of northern Minnesota. While the Mesabi Range had iron ore close enough to the surface to enable pit mining, mines had to be dug deep underground to reach the ore of the Vermilion and Cuyuna ranges. The Soudan mine was nearly 1/2 mile underground and required blasting of Precambrian sedimentary bedrock.

The banded iron formation in the range consists of a "interbedded sequence" of chert, magnetite and hematite. Eleven mines operated in the range, with five in the Ely area. The Ely Trough, a synclinal fold, produced 70 million metric tons from the Chandler, Pioneer, Zenith, Sibley and Savoy mines. The largest mine in the range, Soudan, was closed in 1962, and the last mine in the Ely area closed in 1964.

Despite the effort needed for the deep mining Soudan mine, the ore obtained was worth the effort; the quality of the hematite ore was so pure that two pieces could be welded. The bedrock, known as taconite, also contained iron, but in a much lower concentration. After more efficient practices for creating steel were discovered, the use of this high-quality ore was abandoned due to its more costly mining expense.

The Soudan hematite was used in the open hearth furnace, where the density of the ore, called Vermilion Lump, was needed to break through the floating slag to cause the molten charge to roil and burn off the impurities. When the newer blast furnaces came into use, the expensive Vermilion Lump was no longer needed. New processes were developed to extract the iron from the taconite by using open-pit mining and producing taconite pellets. This method produced a processed ore product at a significantly reduced cost. Once proven successful, the technical change resulted in Minnesota's iron industry centering on the Mesabi Range, where the taconite was much easier to access.

== See also ==
- Animikie Group
- Mesabi Range
- Soudan Underground Mine State Park
- Cuyuna Range
- Gogebic Range
- Gunflint Range
- Marquette Iron Range
- Geology of Minnesota
