= Rose Lake (Pigeon River) =

Lake in the state of Minnesota, United States

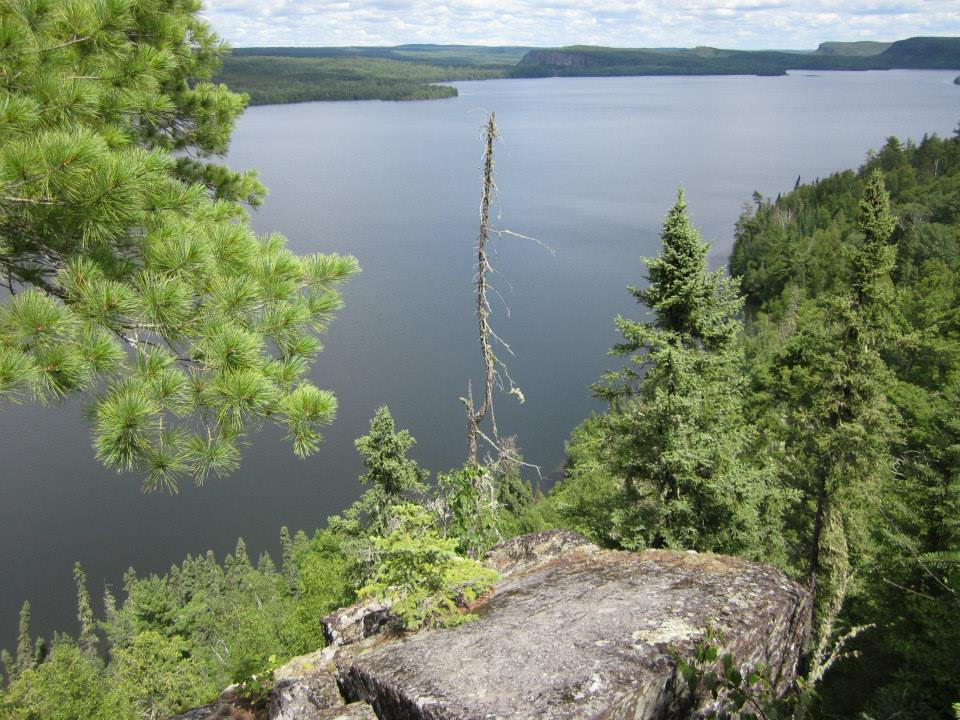

- Location within Minnesota
- Interactive map of Rose Lake
- Location: Cook County, Minnesota, and Ontario.
- Coordinates: 48.101°N 90.426°W
- Primary inflows: Duncan Lake, Daniels Lake, Rat Lake, Rove Lake
- Primary outflows: Arrow River
- Basin countries: United States, Canada
- Surface area: 1,315 acres (5 km^{2})
- Max. depth: 90 ft (27 m)
- Surface elevation: 1,528 ft (466 m)

Rose Lake is a lake on the border between Cook County, Minnesota and Ontario.

== Topography ==
Rose Lake covers a surface of 1315 acres and has a maximum depth of 90 feet. It rests in the Rove Formation, which is characterized by Animikie slates interrupted by diabase sills which form long, parallel, east-west ridges with shallow south rises and steep cliffs on the north. The ridge to the south of Rose Lake rises three hundred feet over the lake's surface for nearly all its length. Rose Lake Mountain, on the ridge to the south, was originally surveyed at 1997 feet above sea level. Rose sits at 1528 feet above sea level, and being the lowest surface water in the Rove Formation, drains the nearby Duncan Lake, South Lake, and Watap Lake. It empties into the Arrow River, a tributary of the Pigeon River, which ultimately drains into Lake Superior.

== Plant and animal life ==
Rose Lake contains Walleye, Lake Trout, Smallmouth Bass, Cisco, Lake Whitefish, Rainbow Smelt, Burbot, Yellow Perch, and White Sucker. It sits in a forest dominated by white pines and cedars.

== Human use ==
Rose Lake became the terminus of the Alger Smith railroad after the General Logging Company purchased its northern portion and extended it from Two Island Lake in the 1920s. Logging reached the eastern shore of Rose Lake around 1929, but ended shortly thereafter when the General Logging Company suffered setbacks due to the Brule Lake Fire of 1929 and the onset of the Great Depression. In 1936, a forest fire began in Ontario and crossed the international border at the lake, but was contained by the firefighting crews of the Superior National Forest.

Rose Lake is in the Boundary Waters Canoe Area within the USA and the Crownland of Ontario Canada. The BWCA restricts access to specific entry points. Rose Lake may be accessed by canoe through a portage from Duncan Lake, or by foot through the Border Route Trail or Caribou Rock Trail.

== Rose Falls ==
Rose Falls is a popular destination for those wanting to experience the BWCA on a single-day trip. Canoers can put in at Bearskin Lake, outside the BWCA, for a short paddle to the .25 mi well-used and maintained portage. Duncan Lake on the other side of the portage is fully in the BWCA. On the opposing side of Duncan Lake there are several trails for exploring Rose Falls, and the infamous Stairway Portage all the way to Rose Lake.

== Climate ==
There is no weather station, but this climate table contains interpolated data. Rose Falls has a humid continental climate (Köppen Dfb), closely bordering on a subarctic climate (Köppen Dfc).

Climate data for Rose Falls 48.0923 N, 90.4358 W, Elevation: 1,736 ft (529 m) (1991–2020 normals)
Month	Jan	Feb	Mar	Apr	May	Jun	Jul	Aug	Sep	Oct	Nov	Dec	Year
Mean daily maximum °F (°C)	13.6 (−10.2)	19.9 (−6.7)	33.1 (0.6)	44.8 (7.1)	59.8 (15.4)	69.9 (21.1)	74.8 (23.8)	74.0 (23.3)	64.2 (17.9)	47.5 (8.6)	32.5 (0.3)	19.3 (−7.1)	46.1 (7.8)
Daily mean °F (°C)	2.6 (−16.3)	7.5 (−13.6)	19.8 (−6.8)	33.5 (0.8)	48.3 (9.1)	58.7 (14.8)	63.9 (17.7)	62.1 (16.7)	53.8 (12.1)	38.9 (3.8)	23.7 (−4.6)	10.0 (−12.2)	35.2 (1.8)
Mean daily minimum °F (°C)	−8.5 (−22.5)	−5.0 (−20.6)	6.5 (−14.2)	22.1 (−5.5)	36.8 (2.7)	47.6 (8.7)	53.1 (11.7)	50.2 (10.1)	43.5 (6.4)	30.4 (−0.9)	15.0 (−9.4)	0.7 (−17.4)	24.4 (−4.2)
Average precipitation inches (mm)	1.32 (34)	1.11 (28)	1.23 (31)	2.15 (55)	3.09 (78)	3.90 (99)	3.94 (100)	3.11 (79)	3.41 (87)	2.91 (74)	1.96 (50)	1.68 (43)	29.81 (758)
Source: PRISM Climate Group
