= Gunflint chert =

Geologic formation in Minnesota and Ontario

- Stratigraphic range: 1.88 Ga
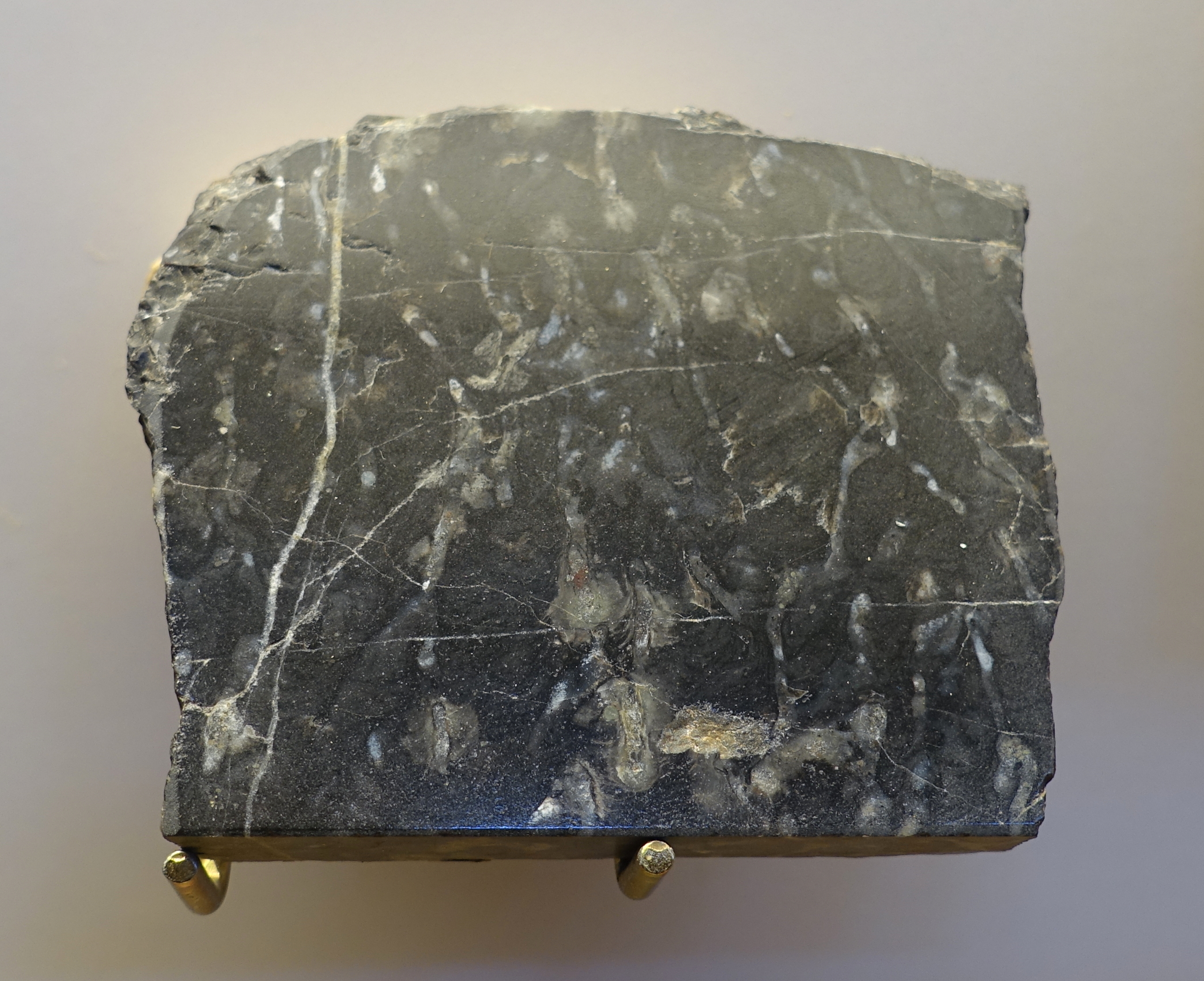
- Microfossils of microbes similar to cyanobacteria, Gunflint Formation, north shore of Lake Superior, 1.9 billion years old
- Type: Geological formation

Lithology
- Primary: Banded iron formation

Location
- Region: Minnesota; Ontario

Type section
- Named for: Gunflint Range

The Gunflint chert (1.88 Ga) is a sequence of banded iron formation rocks that are exposed in the Gunflint Range of northern Minnesota and northwestern Ontario along the north shore of Lake Superior. The Gunflint Chert is of paleontological significance, as it contains evidence of microbial life from the Paleoproterozoic. The Gunflint Chert is composed of biogenic stromatolites. At the time of its discovery in the 1950s, it was the earliest form of life discovered and described in scientific literature, as well as the earliest evidence for photosynthesis. The black layers in the sequence contain microfossils that are 1.9 to 2.3 billion years in age. Stromatolite colonies of cyanobacteria that have converted to jasper are found in Ontario. The banded ironstone formation consists of alternating strata of iron oxide-rich layers interbedded with silica-rich zones. The iron oxides are typically hematite or magnetite with ilmenite, while the silicates are predominantly cryptocrystalline quartz as chert or jasper, along with some minor silicate minerals.

The Gunflint Iron Formation (exposed as the Gunflint Range) spans northwestern Ontario and northern Minnesota along the shores of Lake Superior. The type locality of the Gunflint Iron Formation is at Schreiber, ON near Lake Superior's Thunder Bay.

Geologist Stanley A. Tyler first examined the area in 1953 and noticed its red-colored stromatolites. He also sampled a jet-black chert layer which, when observed petrographically, revealed some lifelike small spheres, rods and filaments less than 10 micrometres in size. Elso Barghoorn, a paleobotanist at Harvard, subsequently looked at these same samples and concluded that "they were indeed structurally preserved unicellular organisms." In 1965 the two scientists published their landmark finding and named the first variety of Gunflint flora. This created an academic "stampede" to explore Precambrian microfossils from similar Proterozoic environments. While older microfossils have since been described, the Gunflint microfauna is a historic geologic discovery and remains one of the most robust and diverse microfaunal fossil assemblages from the Precambrian.

== Stratigraphy ==
The Gunflint Iron Formation is a banded iron formation, composed predominantly of dense chert and slate layers interbedded with ankerite carbonate layers. The chert layers can be subdivided into black layers (containing organic material and pyrite), red layers (containing hematite), and green layers (containing siderite). The Gunflint Iron Formation belongs to the Animike Group and can be broken up into four stratigraphic sections, the Lower Cherty, Lower Slaty, Upper Cherty, and Upper Slaty sections. Microfossils can be found in the stromatolitic chert layers, consisting of cyanobacteria, algal filaments, spore-like spheroids, and organic-rich ooids.

== History ==
Geologist Stanley A. Tyler first examined the Gunflint Range in 1953 and observed red iron banded formations and black chert, noting probable stromatolites, though he would not go on to publish his observations for another decade. A. M. Goodwin later examined the geologic facies of the Gunflint Iron Formation in 1956, resulting in one of the first science publications on the region, but his report is devoid of any mention of microscopic life. The first publications noting the geobiological significance of the Gunflint Chert came in 1965 when two scientific papers highlighting the Gunflint microfauna were published in the preeminent journal Science. These papers were Stanley Tyler and Elso Barghoorn's 'Microorganisms from the Gunflint Chert' and Preston Cloud's (University of California at Santa Barbara) 'Significance of the Gunflint (Precambrian) Microflora'. While published at nearly the same time, both papers served as landmark publications introducing the idea of life occurring during the Precambrian. Each paper had markedly different foci: while Barghoorn and Tyler aimed to characterize the individual microorganisms that comprise the Gunflint chert from a taxonomical and morphological standpoint, Cloud focused on the larger-scale significance of the prospect of life existing during the Precambrian period and its implications for the field of Precambrian paleontology. The publication of these two seminal papers opened the floodgates to a vast array of paleontological and geochemical studies to explore Precambrian microfossils from similar Proterozoic environments.

== Age ==
The Gunflint chert microfauna is mid- to late-Paleoproterozoic in age (approximately 1.878 Ga ± 1.3 Ma, as determined by Uranium-Lead dating techniques). This age has fluctuated as dating techniques have become more accurate and precise. Initial whole-rock Rubidium-Strontium and Potassium-Argon dating placed the age of the Gunflint Iron Formation at 1.56-163 Ga. Whole-rock Neodymium-Samarium dating later placed the age between 2.08 and 2.11 Ga. Finally, dating of interbedded ash layers within the Gunflint Iron Formation yielded ages between 1.86 and 1.99 Ga, which are most similar to the current consensus age of 1.878 Ga ± 1.3 Ma. At the time of discovery of the Gunflint Chert, the oldest evidence of life known was the Ediacaran fauna (635-541 Ma), a late Precambrian assemblage less than half the age of the Gunflint microorganisms.

== Microfaunal diversity ==
The most abundant organisms in Gunflint are filaments found in stromatolitic fabrics, and typically range from 0.5-6.0 μm in diameter and up to several hundred microns in length. The Gunflint microfauna can be split into two broad categories: filaments and spheroids. In the groundbreaking 1965 Barghoorn and Tyler paper, three new genera and four new species of filamentous cyanobacteria were discovered from Gunflint chert. Since then various new genera and species have been identified, some named after Barghoorn, Tyler, and Cloud in acknowledgement of their early contributions in defining the Gunflint microbial assemblages.

=== Filamentous microorganisms ===
Filamentous microorganisms within the Gunflint Chert represent a mixed population of photosynthetic cyanobacteria and iron oxidizing bacteria. On the outcrop scale, the filamentous Gunflint cyanobacteria form meter-scale stromatolitic domes, which are discernible along the Gunflint Iron Formation stratigraphic section. Examples of newly identified filamentous genera and species within the Gunflint Chert include the genus Gunflintia and the species Animikiea septate, Entosphaeroides amplus, and Archaeorestis schreiberensis.

=== Spheroidal microorganisms ===
Spheroidal spore-like bodies within the Gunflint Chert are found irregularly distributed throughout the Gunflint Iron Formation, and range from 1 to 16 μm in diameter. The spheroidal bodies range from spherical to ellipsoidal in morphology. They are typically encased in a membrane which can vary in wall thickness and morphology. The spheroidal bodies have been hypothesized to be various things, such as unicellular cyanobacteria, endogenously produced endospores of bacterial origin, free-swimming dinoflagellates, and fungus spores. Examples of newly identified spheroidal genera and species within the Gunflint Chert include the genera Huroniospora and Eoasatrion, as well as the species Eosphaera tyleri.

== Preservation of microfauna ==
Various predominant taphonomic models have been suggested as mechanisms for the exceptional preservation of the Gunflint Chert microfauna. Examples of these taphonomic models include organic residue preservation, fine-grain pyritization, coarse-grain pyritization, carbonate association, and hematite preservation. In organic residue preservation, a film of light-to-dark brown organic material outlines microorganisms, acting as a stain and preserving filaments, spore-like bodies, and carbonate rhombs within chert. Fine-grain pyritization is the most common type of preservation in the Gunflint Cherts, in which association of fine-grained (micrometer scale) pyrite with organic matter preserves the morphology of filamentous and spheroidal microorganisms. Coarse-grained pyritization occurs when millimeter scale pyrite minerals replace organic matter in cherts, preserving microorganism morphology. In carbonate association, filaments, spore-like bodies, and other organic structures can be preserved by carbonate mineralization (<1μm in diameter) imbedded in a chert matrix. Carbonate minerals can form as continuous bodies or as a series of lenses outlining filamentous cyanobacterial remains. Carbonate mineralization is often seen trailing pyrite crystals. Hematite preservation is a less common taphonomic mode, but is occasionally found at the interface between black stromatolitic cherts and red jasper. In this preservational method, hematite filaments <1μm in diameter encase (and occasionally replace) filamentous fossils, and are often outlined by carbonaceous films and pyrite grains. As a result of the remarkable preservation of microorganisms given the taphonomic modes described above, the Gunflint Chert is sometimes described as the first Precambrian lagerstätte, or exceptionally preserved fossil assemblage.

== Significance and paleoenvironmental implications ==
In the 1950s and 1960s, the state of the Precambrian atmosphere was not well characterized. The discovery of the Gunflint microbiota revealed that photosynthesis (or an ancient autotrophic precursor modality) was occurring 1.8 billion years ago, and that the atmosphere was oxygenated enough to sustain microbial life. The mineralogy of the Gunflint banded iron formation reveals a complex relationship between these redox conditions throughout the Gunflint Formation. Multiple iron species in the Gunflint formation provides evidence for a highly oxidative atmosphere, with some localized reducing conditions which allowed for the transport of large quantities of iron in a soluble ferrous state.

While the Gunflint microfauna no longer represents the oldest life discovered on Earth, at the time of discovery it pushed back the presumptive age of photosynthesis and the origin of life boundary by over one billion years. This discovery spurred generations of paleontologists and geomicrobiologists to contemplate ancient atmospheric oxygen conditions and redox states, and to continue searching for older microbial life.

== See also ==
- Oxygen catastrophe
- Animikie Group
