= Penokean orogeny =

The Penokean orogeny was a mountain-building episode that occurred in the early Proterozoic about 1.86 to 1.83 billion years ago, in the area of Lake Superior, North America. The core of this orogeny, the Churchill Craton, is composed of terranes derived from the 1.86–1.81 Ga collision between the Superior and North Atlantic cratons. The orogeny resulted in the formation of the Nena and Arctica continents, which later merged with other continents to form the Columbia supercontinent. The name was first proposed by Blackwelder 1914 in reference to what is known as the Penokee Range, sometimes incorrectly called the Gogebic Range, in northern Michigan and Wisconsin.

The Paleoproterozoic Penokean orogeny developed in an embayment on the southern margin of the Superior Craton. It extends east from Minnesota to the Grenville orogen near Lake Huron and south to the Central Plain in Wisconsin. It is composed of two domains separated by the Niagara Fault Zone: the southern, internal domain, the Wisconsin Magmatic Terranes, consists of Paleoproterzoic tholeiitic and calc-alkaline island arc rocks and calc-alkaline plutonic rocks; the northern, external domain consists of a continental margin foreland basin overlying an Archaean basement and includes the supracrustal rocks of the Animikie Group and Marquette Range Supergroup. The collision between the two domains around 1.88–1.85 Ga resulted in northward-directed thrusting and folding of the northern domain.

Before this episode the area was a passive continental margin occupied by a shallow sea, which created large sedimentary deposits including the banded iron formations of the Iron Ranges.

The orogeny happened in two phases. First an island arc called the Pembine-Wausau terrane collided with the ancient North American craton along with volcanoes formed in its back-arc basin. The second phase involved a microcontinent called the Marshfield terrane, which today forms parts of Wisconsin and Minnesota. The episode lasted about 10 million years.

Hundreds of millions of years later, the Keweenawan Rift occurred in the same area creating the basin that would eventually become Lake Superior. The remains of this orogeny can be seen today as the Iron Ranges of Minnesota and Ontario, the Northern Highlands of Wisconsin and the Upper Peninsula of Michigan.

== See also ==
- Plate tectonics
