= Geography of Ontario =

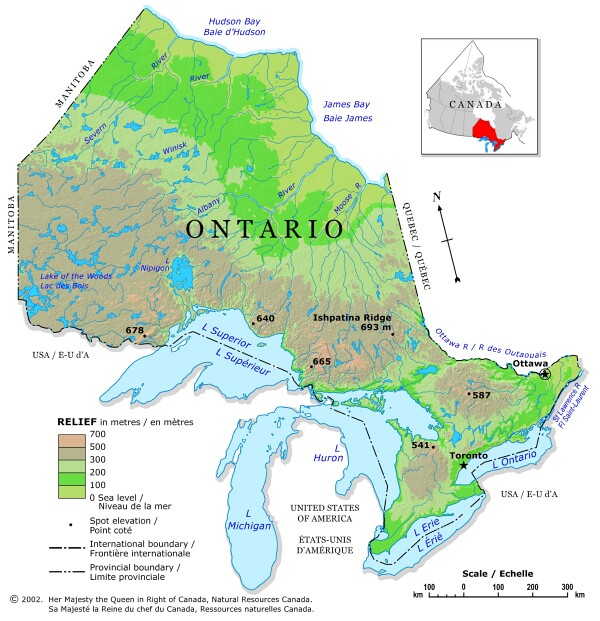
- Continent: North America
- Region: Eastern Canada; Central Canada
- Coordinates: 49°15′0″N 84°29′59″W
- Area
  - Total: 1,076,395 km^{2} (415,598 sq mi)
  - Land: 85.3%
  - Water: 14.7%
- Coastline: 3,840 km (2,390 mi)
- Borders: Total land borders: U.S. states Michigan, New York, Minnesota; Canadian provinces Manitoba, Nunavut, and Quebec
- Highest point: Ishpatina Ridge; 693 m (2,274 ft)
- Lowest point: Hudson Bay sea level
- Longest river: Albany River; 980 km (610 mi)
- Largest lake: Lake Superior; 28,700 km^{2} (11,100 sq mi) (Canadian portion only)

Ontario is located in East/Central Canada. It is Canada's second largest province by land area. Its physical features vary greatly from the Mixedwood Plains in the southeast to the boreal forests and tundra in the north. Ontario borders Manitoba to the west, Hudson Bay and James Bay to the north, Quebec to the east, and the Great Lakes and the United States to the south. The province is named for Great Lake Ontario, an adaptation of the Iroquois word Onitariio, meaning "beautiful lake", or Kanadario, variously translated as "beautiful water". There are approximately 250,000 lakes and over 100,000 kilometres (62,000 mi) of rivers in the province.

Almost 94% of the population is concentrated within Southern Ontario, where the population was over 12,850,000 in the 2011 census. The Golden Horseshoe is the most populous part of Southern Ontario, with a population of 9,765,188 in the 2021 census.

== Population ==
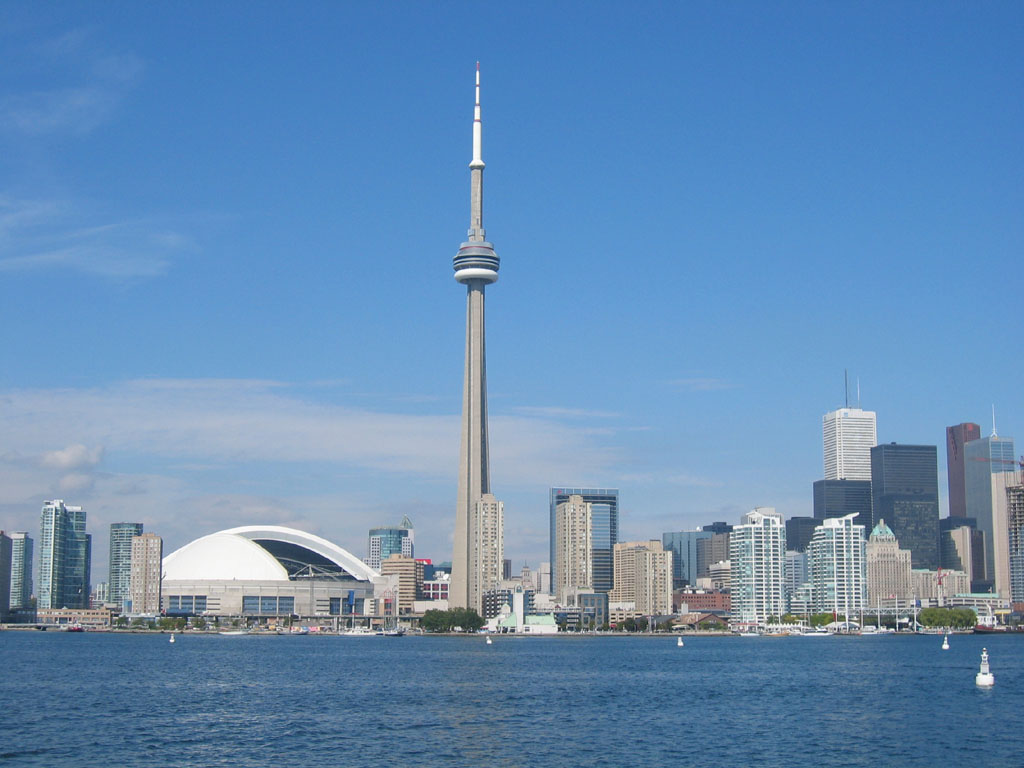
The Toronto skyline seen from Toronto Harbour

Ontario is the most populous province in Canada. Southern Ontario is one of the densest regions in the country. The north is vast and sparse compared to the south. The national capital Ottawa is located in Ontario bordering Quebec. Located within the Golden Horseshoe, Toronto is the capital of Ontario, the financial centre of Canada, and the country's most populous city.

Ontario is the second-most urbanized province after British Columbia, with 85.9% of the population living in urban areas.

Population by Statistical Area Classification
Statistical Area Classification	2011 Census		2006 Census		Change
Statistical Area Classification	Population	% of total	Population	% of total	Change
Within CMAs	10,270,006	79.9%	9,591,529	78.9%	▲7.1%
Within CAs	1,133,127	8.8%	1,128,614	9.3%	▲0.4%
Total CMA/CA	11,403,133	88.7%	10,720,143	88.2%	▲6.4%
Strongly influenced	644,299	5.0%	631,410	5.2%	▲2.0%
Moderately influenced	555,931	4.3%	554,062	4.5%	▲0.3%
Weakly influenced	225,197	1.8%	232,107	1.9%	▼3.0%
Not influenced	23,261	0.2%	22,560	0.2%	▲3.1%
Outside CMA/CA	1,448,688	11.3%	1,440,139	11.8%	▲0.6%
Total	12,851,821	100.0%	12,160,282	100.0%	▲5.7%

Census Metropolitan Areas (CMAs) by population
City	2016	2011	2006	2001	1996	1991
Toronto	5,928,040	5,583,064	5,113,149	4,682,897	4,263,757	3,898,933
Ottawa-Gatineau	1,323,783	1,236,324	1,130,761	1,063,664	1,010,498	941,814
Hamilton	747,545	721,053	692,911	662,401	624,360	599,760
Kitchener-Cambridge-Waterloo	523,894	477,160	451,235	414,284	382,940	356,421
London	494,069	474,786	457,720	432,451	398,616	381,522
St. Catharines-Niagara	406,074	392,184	390,317	377,009	372,406	364,552
Oshawa	379,848	356,177	330,594	296,298	268,773	240,104
Windsor	329,144	319,246	323,342	307,877	278,685	262,075
Barrie	197,059	187,013	177,061	148,480	118,695	97,150
Greater Sudbury	164,689	160,770	158,258	155,601	160,488	157,613
Kingston	161,175	159,561	152,358	146,838	143,416	136,401
Guelph	151,984	141,097	127,009	117,344	105,420	97,667
Brantford	134,203	135,501	124,607	86,417	100,238	97,106
Peterborough	121,721	118,975	|102,423	100,193	98,060	-
Thunder Bay	121,621	121,596	122,907	121,986	125,562	124,925
Belleville	103,472	101,668	91,518	87,395	87,871	-

10 largest municipalities by population
City	2011	2006	2001
Toronto (provincial capital)	2,615,060	2,503,281	2,481,494
Ottawa (national capital)	883,391	812,129	808,391
Mississauga	713,443	668,549	612,925
Brampton	523,911	433,806	325,428
Hamilton	519,949	504,559	499,268
London	366,151	352,395	336,539
Markham	301,709	261,573	208,615
Vaughan	288,301	238,866	182,022
Kitchener	219,153	204,668	190,399
Windsor	210,891	216,473	208,402

== Physical geography ==
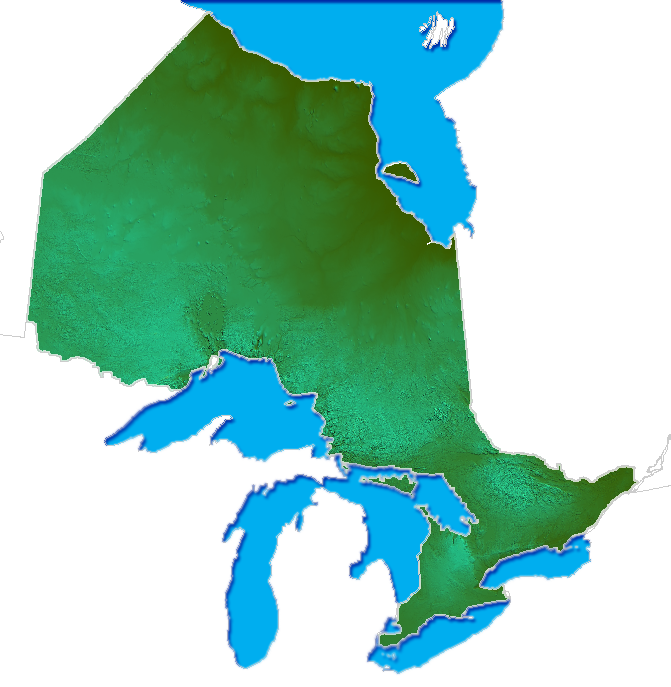
Relief of Ontario

Southwestern Ontario and a narrow strip along the coast of the Saint Lawrence River are in the Mixedwood Plains, a fertile and productive ecozone that is typically flat with rolling hills, and was once covered by forest before its use for agriculture, and later urbanization, resulted in deforestation of vast swaths of the area. To its north is the Boreal Shield, the largest provincial ecozone, extending from south-central Ontario to cover most of northern Ontario, where it abuts the Hudson Plains. The Northwestern Ontario portion of this area is part of the Midwestern Canadian Shield forests ecoregion of boreal forest that spreads west through Manitoba and Saskatchewan. The plains that cover the heartland of Ontario are a transitional ecozone characterized by boreal features in the south and tundra landscapes in the north. This extends the entire range of the northern coast of Ontario with Hudson Bay and James Bay, at which numerous wetlands act as staging and nesting grounds for migratory birds. The waters of the two bays are in the Arctic Archipelago Marine ecozone, forming its southern, subarctic extent.

=== Boundaries ===
The longest border is with the Canadian province of Manitoba to the west for approximately 1,025 km (637 mi) along a line defined as the Northwesternmost point of the Lake of the Woods to latitude 52°50' N then a diagonal line to the point where the shore of Hudson Bay meets the 89th meridian west of Greenwich. The boundary of Ontario on Hudson and James Bay does not extend beyond the shoreline, as all islands within the bays belong to Nunavut. The border with Quebec is defined by a line due north of the head of Lake Timiskaming to James Bay, and southeast from there, the Ottawa River for about 620 km (390 mi). The boundary follows a small portion of land south of the Ottawa River until it meets the Saint Lawrence River near Cornwall.

Ontario also shares borders with several U.S. states. From west to east, the Minnesota border consists of the Lake of the Woods, Rainy River, Rainy Lake and its tributaries. The border then includes the only 1 km of land of its entire 2,700 km U.S. border, the Height of Land Portage, which divides the Arctic Ocean and Nelson River watershed from that of the St Lawrence River and the Atlantic Ocean. The U.S./Minnesota border then follows tributaries of the Pigeon River to its mouth at Lake Superior. Ontario borders Michigan across Lake Superior, the Saint Mary's River, Lake Huron, the St. Clair River, Lake St. Clair, the Detroit River, and Lake Erie. The province also borders Ohio and Pennsylvania across Lake Erie. The 309 km boundary with New York includes Lake Ontario, the St. Lawrence and Niagara rivers.

=== Elevation ===
An extensive amount of land along the south and west shores of James Bay and Hudson Bay is low and covered with wetlands. The land in the North-east and North-west, generally north of Lake Superior, is the Canadian Shield where most of Ontario's highest points are found.

Further south, many hilltops of the Algonquin, Haliburton and Madawaska Highlands, which are also part of the shield that covers much of the north, surpass altitudes of 500 m (1640').

The Municipality of Temagami is located on the northeast arm of Lake Temagami, 100 km north of North Bay. Ontario's highest point, Ishpatina Ridge (693 metres), is within the municipality's boundaries. The next highest points are in Dufferin, Grey and the western side of Simcoe counties, where the elevation ranges from 430 m (1,400') to 540 m (1,750'). Much of the higher land sits atop the Niagara Escarpment in a generally flat area known as the Dundalk Highlands. Just to the south, in Wellington County and Waterloo Region, general elevations are from 300 m (1,000') to 400 m (1,300'). A striking topographical feature of the Niagara Escarpment is its limestone cliff face, in general between 80 m (250') and 100 m (330') above the surrounding land, extending from the Niagara peninsula northwest to the Bruce Peninsula.

The flattest areas of the province can be found in the lowlands of the far north, and in southwestern and eastern Ontario.

=== Water ===
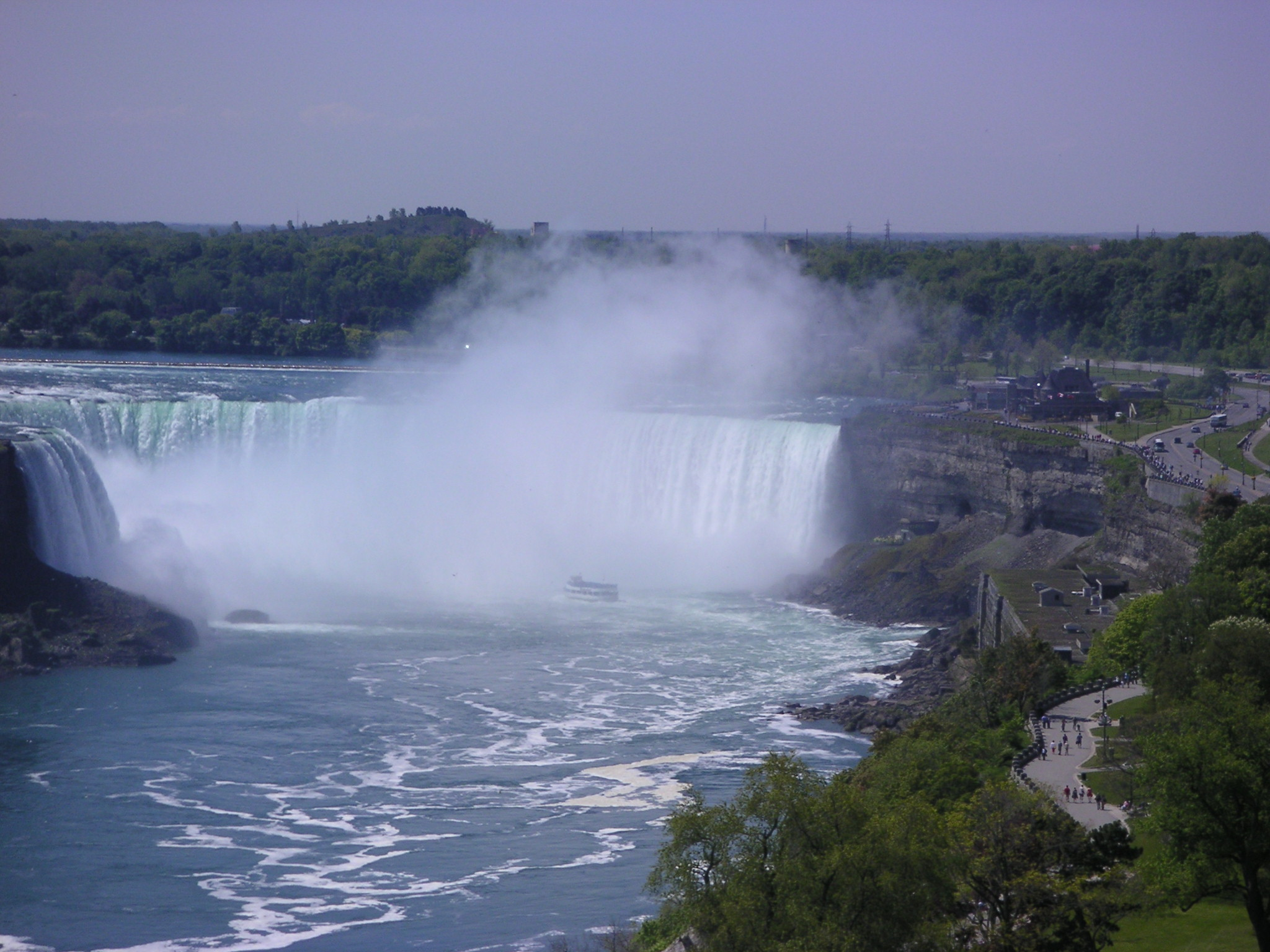
Niagara Falls, one of Ontario's most noted tourist destination and a source for hydroelectricity

Ontario is known for the large number of lakes and rivers it contains. Ontario contains more than 250,000 lakes (including those forming part of the Great Lakes). The Great Lakes are a large binational system shared between Canada and the United States, which hold roughly 20% of the world’s fresh surface water; this figure reflects the volume of the Great Lakes as a whole, not the many smaller lakes across Ontario. Ontario is also known for being the only province in Canada that touches the Great Lakes. Ontario touches four of the Great Lakes: Huron, Lake Ontario (the province is named after the lake), Erie and Superior.

Ontario's vast rivers and lakes originally opened the province for exploration and have made possible hydroelectric power, mills and various forms of industrialization. Most of Ontario is fed by rainfall, and in most parts snow is relied on. Precipitation is most common in the southern and central parts of Ontario where variations among the seasons are not especially great; but winter and spring are less aqueous than in northern and northwestern Ontario.

== Climate ==
Köppen climate types of Ontario

The climate of Ontario varies by season and location. It is affected by three air sources: cold, dry, arctic air from the north (dominant factor during the winter months, and for a longer part of the year in far northern Ontario); Pacific polar air crossing in from the western Canadian Prairies/US Northern Plains; and warm, moist air from the Gulf of Mexico and the Atlantic Ocean. The effects of these major air masses on temperature and precipitation depend mainly on latitude, proximity to major bodies of water and to a small extent, terrain relief. The surrounding Great Lakes greatly influence the climatic region of southern Ontario. During the fall and winter months, heat stored from the lakes is released, moderating the climate near the shores of the lakes. This gives some parts of southern Ontario milder winters than mid-continental areas at lower latitudes. In general, most of Ontario's climate is classified as humid continental.

Ontario has three main climatic regions:

=== Southern Ontario ===
Almost all of southern Ontario either falls in the Köppen climate classification Dfb or Dfa, found in Windsor and over a large part of Southwestern Ontario, and further to the east, in the city of Toronto and over most of the southern half of the Golden Horseshoe wrapping around the west end of Lake Ontario, which encompasses the Niagara Region. Some cities straddle the zone boundary, such as London, the upper part of Hamilton, and Cornwall in Southeastern Ontario. Other cities fit into the Dfb schema, including Kitchener, Barrie, Kingston and Ottawa. The region has warm, humid summers and cold, usually moist winters. Extreme heat and cold usually occur for short periods. It is considered a temperate climate when compared with the remainder of continental Canada. In the fall and winter, temperatures are moderated by the delayed cooling of the Great Lakes; this effect is reversed in spring and summer when afternoon warming is tempered. The lakes' moderating effects allow for a longer growing season than areas at similar latitudes in the continent's interior; some areas exceed 200 frost-free days and have an annual mean temperature of 10 °C (50 °F). Both spring and fall generally consist of mild days and cool nights but are prone to drastic temperature changes over a short timespan. Annual precipitation ranges from 75 to 110 cm (30–43 in) and is well distributed throughout the year with a usual summer peak. Upland areas in this region have cooler conditions, examples would be Mount Forest and Bancroft, generally more precipitation (especially snowfall), putting them firmly into the Dfb climate scheme. Most of Southern Ontario lies in the lee of the Great Lakes, producing abundant snow in some areas: (London, Goderich and Barrie, for example) receive an average of over 202 centimetres (80 in) annually, while some other areas are not in the direct line of snowbelt activity can receive on average less 101 centimetres (40 in) of snow per year, such as in Chatham and Brantford.

=== Northern Ontario ===
Also included in the Dfb climate are the southern reaches of including the cities of Sudbury and North Bay, which have a more severe humid continental climate. This region has warm and humid summers but with more variability, a much shorter growing season with cold, longer winters with roughly equal annual precipitation to the south. Along the eastern shores of Lake Superior and Lake Huron (including Georgian Bay), the longer winters and frequent heavy lake-effect snow squalls increase seasonal snowfall totals upwards of 3 m (120 in) in some locations, such as Wawa but further north in Timmins far removed from the lakes influence.

Köppen climate classification Dfc: The northernmost parts of Ontario — primarily north of 50°N and with no major cities in the area — have a subarctic climate with long, severely cold winters and short summers, with dramatic temperature changes possible in all seasons. In summer, hot weather occasionally reaches even the northernmost parts of Ontario for brief periods, although humidity is generally lower than in the south. With no major mountain ranges blocking sinking Arctic air masses, temperatures of −40 °C (−40 °F) are not uncommon. The snow stays on the ground much longer here than in other regions of Ontario; snow cover is usually present to some extent between October and May. Surprisingly warm to hot temperatures sometimes occur in Northern Ontario communities when there is a long flow of wind from the south, as happened on 10 May 2022 when Moosonee recorded Canada's first 30 °C or 86 °F reading of the year.

=== Severe weather ===
Severe and non-severe thunderstorms peak in frequency from June through August but can occur at any time. Thunderstorm activity is frequent, and occasionally severe across the South, but also in Central and Northwestern Ontario. Thunderstorms form from daytime convective heating and frontal activity; in the south, lake breeze convergences also intensify storms. Another severe type of thunderstorm is known as a Mesocyclonic Convective Complex or Derecho, which is a larger cluster-type thunderstorm mass with a more or less circular shape, often with a pronounced bow shape at its front or leading edge. During periods of hot weather in summer, they often develop in the afternoon west of the Great Lakes then strike Southern and Central Ontario at night with great forward motion, bringing severe straight-line winds over wide areas resulting in damage to forests, power interruption and infrastructure damage. The areas with the highest severe weather frequency in the province are Southwestern (Windsor, Chatham, Stratford corridor) and Central Ontario (Simcoe County including the city of Barrie, Lake Simcoe and the Kawartha Lakes region), both areas often getting amplified storms resulting from the Lake Breeze Front convergence. London has the most lightning strikes per year in Canada, averaging 34 days of thunderstorm activity per year. In a typical year, based on averages from the period from 1980 to 2009 compiled by the Northern Tornadoes Project, Ontario averaged 18.2 confirmed tornado touchdowns per year. There were a record 29 tornadoes conformed in both 2006 and 2009. These tornadoes, however, are only on occasion destructive (the vast majority are classified as EF0 or EF1 on the Enhanced Fujita scale). In Northern Ontario, some tornadoes go undetected by ground spotters because of the sparse population and remote landscape; they are often discovered after the fact by aircraft pilots, where aerial observations of damaged forest confirm occurrences. All of Northern Ontario north of a line from Lake Nipigon to Timmins has no weather radar coverage by Environment Canada making it difficult to detect tornadoes in far northern Ontario when they occur. Tropical depression remnants can cause copious rains and winds in the south, but are rarely deadly. A notable exception was Hurricane Hazel in October 1954.

=== Climate charts ===
Windsor

Climate chart (precipitation, max. and min. temperature)
J	F	M	A	M	J	J	A	S	O	N	D
71 0 −7	60 1 −6	71 7 −2	92 14 4	97 21 10	83 26 16	99 28 18	76 27 17	88 23 13	74 16 7	73 9 1	69 3 −4
- █ Average max. and min. temperatures in °C
- █ Precipitation totals in mm
Imperial conversion
J	F	M	A	M	J	J	A	S	O	N	D
2.8 32 19	2.4 34 20	2.8 44 28	3.6 57 38	3.8 69 50	3.3 79 60	3.9 83 64	3 81 63	3.5 74 55	2.9 61 44	2.9 48 35	2.7 37 26
- █ Average max. and min. temperatures in °F
- █ Precipitation totals in inches

Toronto

Climate chart (precipitation, max. and min. temperature)
J	F	M	A	M	J	J	A	S	O	N	D
65 0 −7	54 1 −6	53 5 −2	76 12 4	82 19 10	77 24 15	72 27 18	81 26 18	85 22 14	64 15 8	71 8 2	58 3 −3
- █ Average max. and min. temperatures in °C
- █ Precipitation totals in mm
Imperial conversion
J	F	M	A	M	J	J	A	S	O	N	D
2.6 31 20	2.1 33 21	2.1 41 29	3 53 39	3.2 66 50	3 76 60	2.8 81 65	3.2 79 64	3.3 72 57	2.5 58 46	2.8 47 36	2.3 37 27
- █ Average max. and min. temperatures in °F
- █ Precipitation totals in inches

Ottawa

Climate chart (precipitation, max. and min. temperature)
J	F	M	A	M	J	J	A	S	O	N	D
65 −5 −14	52 −3 −13	62 3 −7	81 11 1	80 19 8	95 24 13	92 27 16	87 26 15	87 21 10	90 13 4	72 6 −2	74 −2 −9
- █ Average max. and min. temperatures in °C
- █ Precipitation totals in mm
Imperial conversion
J	F	M	A	M	J	J	A	S	O	N	D
2.6 23 7	2.1 26 9	2.4 37 20	3.2 52 34	3.2 67 46	3.7 76 56	3.6 80 60	3.4 78 58	3.4 70 50	3.6 56 39	2.8 42 29	2.9 29 16
- █ Average max. and min. temperatures in °F
- █ Precipitation totals in inches

Sudbury

Climate chart (precipitation, max. and min. temperature)
J	F	M	A	M	J	J	A	S	O	N	D
67 −8 −18	51 −6 −16	58 1 −10	68 9 −2	79 17 5	77 23 11	84 25 13	90 24 13	103 19 8	94 11 2	75 3 −4	66 −4 −12
- █ Average max. and min. temperatures in °C
- █ Precipitation totals in mm
Imperial conversion
J	F	M	A	M	J	J	A	S	O	N	D
2.6 18 1	2 21 3	2.3 33 14	2.7 47 28	3.1 63 42	3 73 52	3.3 77 56	3.5 74 55	4.1 65 47	3.7 51 35	2.9 37 24	2.6 25 11
- █ Average max. and min. temperatures in °F
- █ Precipitation totals in inches

Thunder Bay

Climate chart (precipitation, max. and min. temperature)
J	F	M	A	M	J	J	A	S	O	N	D
31 −8 −19	25 −5 −18	42 1 −12	42 9 −2	67 16 2	86 22 8	89 25 11	88 24 10	88 19 6	63 11 0	56 3 −7	38 −5 −15
- █ Average max. and min. temperatures in °C
- █ Precipitation totals in mm
Imperial conversion
J	F	M	A	M	J	J	A	S	O	N	D
1.2 18 −3	1 23 −1	1.6 34 11	1.6 48 29	2.6 61 35	3.4 71 46	3.5 77 52	3.4 76 50	3.5 67 42	2.5 52 31	2.2 37 20	1.5 24 6
- █ Average max. and min. temperatures in °F
- █ Precipitation totals in inches

Moosonee

Climate chart (precipitation, max. and min. temperature)
J	F	M	A	M	J	J	A	S	O	N	D
34 −13 −24	23 −11 −24	32 −4 −18	39 4 −8	54 13 0	71 20 6	101 23 10	76 22 9	90 17 6	73 9 1	54 0 −8	35 −9 −18
- █ Average max. and min. temperatures in °C
- █ Precipitation totals in mm
Imperial conversion
J	F	M	A	M	J	J	A	S	O	N	D
1.3 9 −12	0.9 13 −11	1.2 25 0	1.5 39 17	2.1 55 31	2.8 68 42	4 73 50	3 71 49	3.5 62 42	2.9 48 33	2.1 32 19	1.4 16 −1
- █ Average max. and min. temperatures in °F
- █ Precipitation totals in inches

Big Trout Lake

Climate chart (precipitation, max. and min. temperature)
J	F	M	A	M	J	J	A	S	O	N	D
23 −17 −27	21 −13 −26	28 −5 −20	32 4 −10	38 12 −1	74 18 7	91 22 10	88 21 10	83 14 5	53 6 −1	50 −5 −12	29 −14 −22
- █ Average max. and min. temperatures in °C
- █ Precipitation totals in mm
Imperial conversion
J	F	M	A	M	J	J	A	S	O	N	D
0.9 2 −17	0.8 8 −16	1.1 23 −3	1.3 39 14	1.5 54 30	2.9 65 44	3.6 72 50	3.5 69 49	3.3 58 41	2.1 42 30	2 24 11	1.1 8 −8
- █ Average max. and min. temperatures in °F
- █ Precipitation totals in inches

== See also ==
- Geology of Ontario
- Geography of Canada
- Demographics of Ontario
- List of islands of Ontario
- Southern Ontario
- Ontario Peninsula
- Northern Ontario
