= Nor'Wester Mountains =

Mountain range in Ontario, Canada

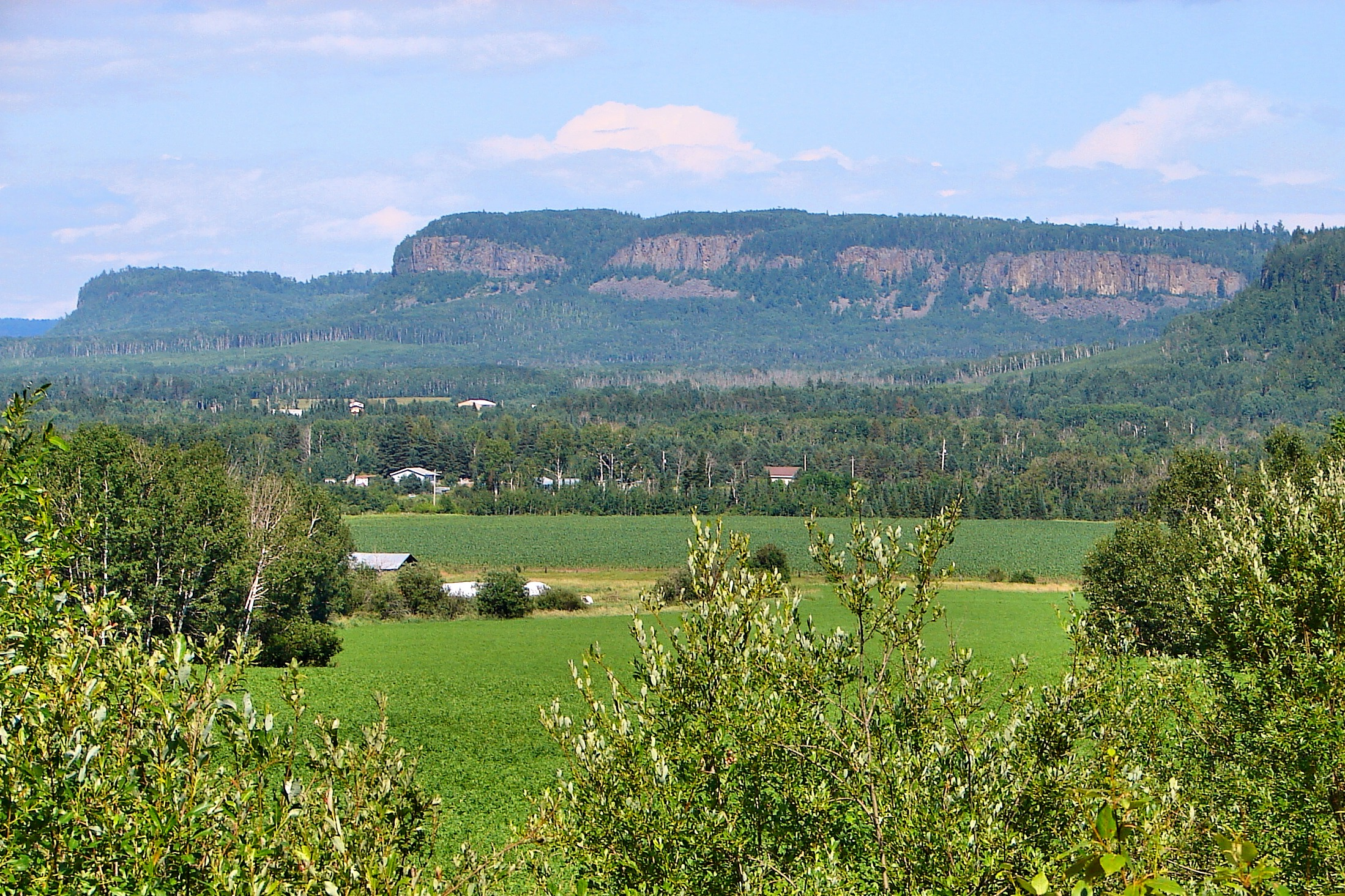
- The Nor'Westers seen from Neebing Township

Highest point
- Peak: Mount McKay
- Elevation: 483 m (1,585 ft)
- Coordinates: 48°20′43″N 89°17′8″W

Geography
- Location within Ontario
- Country: Canada
- Province: Ontario

The Nor'Wester Mountains are a group of mountains immediately south of Thunder Bay, Ontario, Canada, located on the southern limits of the City of Thunder Bay and south of the Kaministiquia River. Mount McKay is the highest, most northern and best known of these mountains. Other prominent peaks include Godfrey, Hurlburt, Johnson, Matchett, McRae, McQuaig, Rose, and Squaretop.

Loch Lomond, 287 m (942 ft) above sea level, collects most of the runoff within the Nor’Wester Mountains; Loch Lomond is drained by the Lomond River. A few square kilometers of mountain slope south of Mount McKay are drained by Whiskeyjack Creek.

== Gallery ==
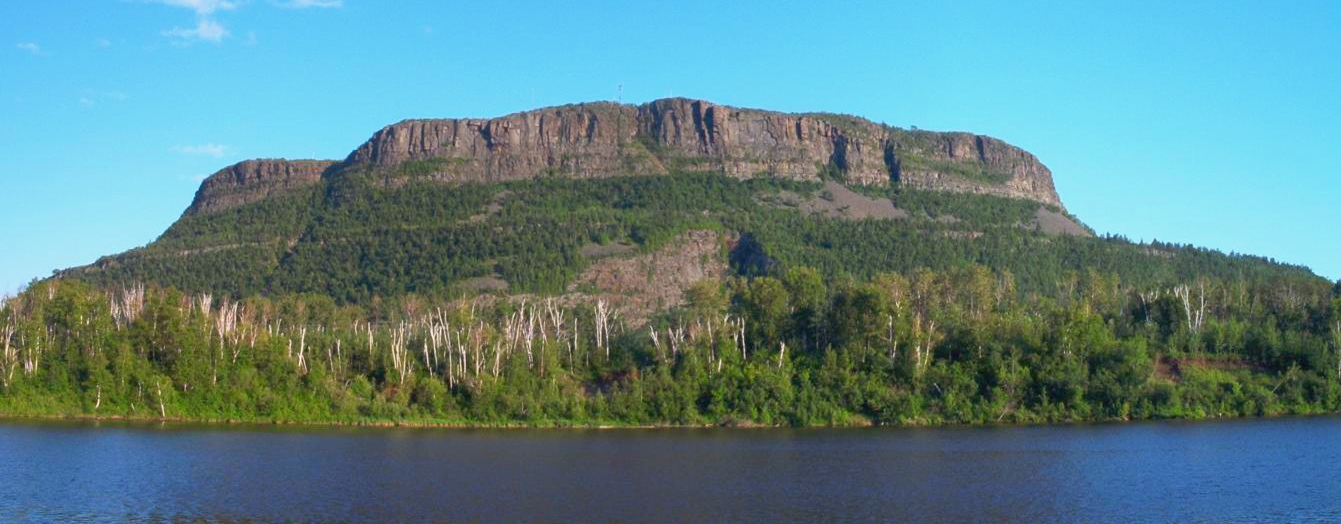
Mount McKay
