= Quirke Lake =

Lake in Ontario, Canada

Coordinates: 46.488°N 82.556°W

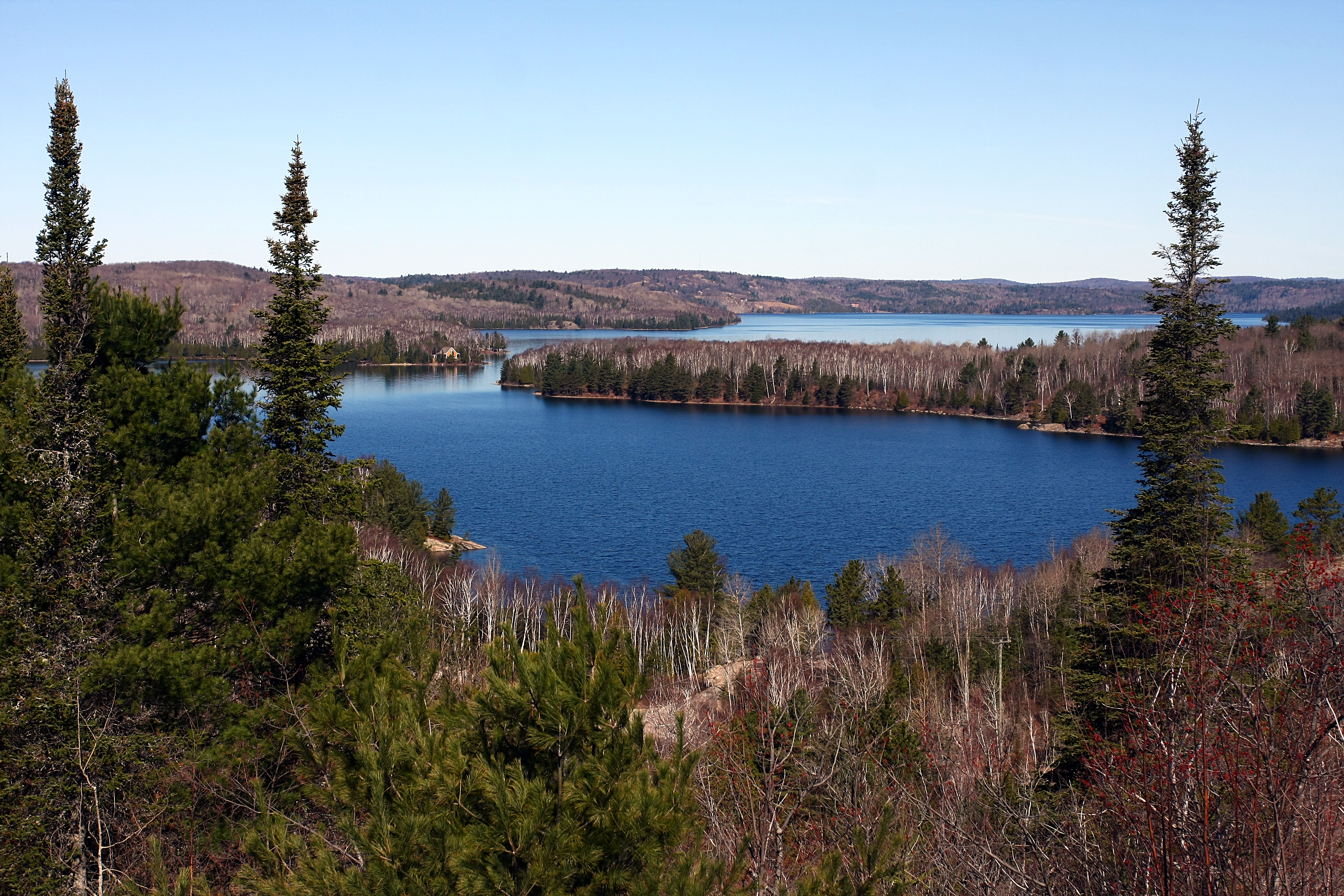
Quirke Lake in 2012

Quirke Lake is body of water located in Ontario, Canada. It is located in the Quirke Lake basin, a geological basin in the northern part of the Huronian Supergroup. The lake is proximate to five decommissioned uranium mines.

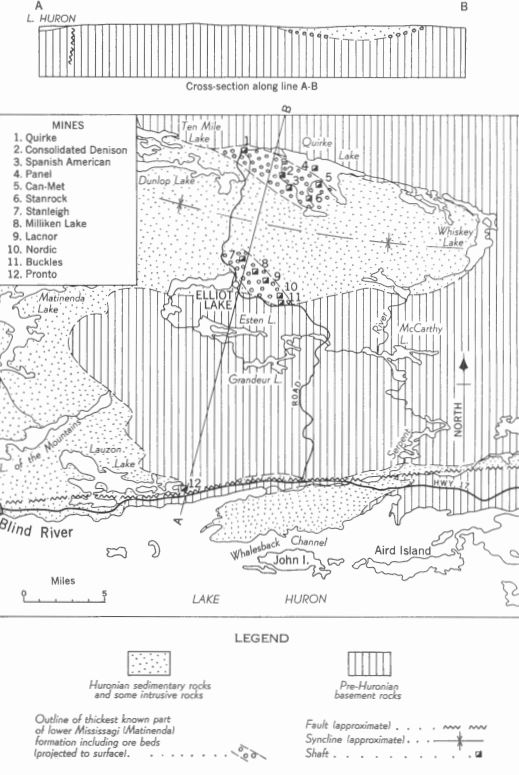
Elliot Lake Mine Map

== Location ==
The lake is located in the Quirke Lake basin (also known as the Quirke Lake trough), a geological basin or trough named after the lake in the northern part of the Huronian Supergroup. The area around the lake is dominated by ridges and valleys.

Water flows into the lake from the Serpent River after exiting Dunlop Lake before flowing into Whiskey Lake. The lake is within the Serpent River watershed.

== Human use ==
The Quirke, Denison, Spanish-American, Can-Met, and Stanrock uranium mines were located in close proximity to the edge of the lake's shore. Historically, mine water was discharged into Quirke Lake from the mines.

Author Vincent Courtenay, who worked in the mines in 1957 spoke about how the mining companies dumped tailings and chemicals into the lake. A late 1990s study entitled Radium-226 in water, sediments, and fish from lakes near the city of Elliot Lake, Ontario, Canada found Radium-226 in trout in the lake. Summer 1993 sampling found the pH level of 6.3, marginally outside Ontario's provincial lower limit of pH6.5 set for aquatic life and drinking water. The study also found that, following the earlier extirpation, reintroduced trout were naturally reproducing at a slightly slower rate than nearby Elliot and Dunlop Lakes. The lake was restocked with pickerel in 2019. In 1996, the lake was categorised by the Ontario Government Ministry of Natural Resources as "fair" for trout reproduction.

In 1996, the Canadian Nuclear Safety Commission reported on consideration that was being given to disposing of uranium mining tailings into the Quirke Lake, but also noted that to do so would be perceived as controversial.

In 2011, a Denison Mines internal report noted that uranium levels still regularly exceeded Ontario's 1994 provincial water quality objective at the inlet to the lake. The same report noted that calculated radiation doses to humans were 0.288 mSv/a (mill-Sieverts per annum) and described the lake as an "area of concern":

"In general, water quality is improving and environmental impacts, such as decreased benthic community taxonomic richness and abundance have reduced in magnitude and spatial extent such that only waterbodies immediately downstream of Quirke, Denison, Panel and Stanleigh are measurably impacted."

== See also ==
- Uranium mining in the Elliot Lake area
- Nuclear labor issues
- Uranium mining and the Navajo people
