= John Doyle =

John Doyle may refer to:

== The arts and entertainment ==
- John Doyle (Canadian artist) (born 1950), Toronto artist
- John Doyle (comedian) (born 1953), Australian comedian and writer
- John Doyle (critic) (born 1957), Canadian television critic
- John Doyle (director) (born 1953), British theatre director
- John Doyle (drummer) (born 1959), drummer for bands Magazine and the Armoury Show
- John Doyle (Irish artist) (1797–1868), Irish artist and grandfather of Arthur Conan Doyle
- John Doyle (guitarist), Irish musician with Solas and Usher's Island
- John Doyle, a pen-name of Robert Graves

== Military ==
- John Doyle (British Army soldier) (1828–1892), Irish cavalryman in the Charge of the Light Brigade
- John Doyle (RAF officer) (1895–1974), British World War I flying ace
- John Milley Doyle (1781–1856), Anglo-Irish soldier

== Politics ==
- Sir John Doyle, 1st Baronet (1756–1834), Irish officer, lieutenant-governor of Guernsey, private secretary to George IV
- John Doyle (Australian politician) (1875–1951), New South Wales politician
- John Doyle (West Virginia politician) (born 1942), member of the West Virginia House of Delegates
- John H. Doyle (1844–1919), Republican politician in the U.S. State of Ohio
- John Paul Doyle (born 1942), American politician in the New Jersey General Assembly
- John F. Doyle (1892–1962), member of the Nebraska House of Representatives

== Sports ==
- John Doyle (baseball) (1858–1915), Canadian Major League Baseball player
- Jack Doyle (baseball) (1869–1958), American baseball player
- Jack Doyle (boxer) (1913–1978), Irish boxer and actor
- John Doyle (Carlow hurler) (born 1992), Irish hurler
- John Doyle (rugby league) (born 1977), Australian
- John Doyle (soccer, born 1946), Australian
- Ally Doyle (born 1949), John Alexander Doyle, Northern Irish footballer, see List of Oldham Athletic A.F.C. players (25–99 appearances)
- John Doyle (English footballer) (born 1960)
- John Doyle (soccer, born 1966), American
- John Doyle (Tipperary hurler) (1930–2010), Irish
- John Joe Doyle (1906–2000), Irish hurler
- Johnny Doyle (Gaelic footballer) (born 1977), Kildare
- Johnny Doyle (hurler) (born 1957), Irish former hurler
- Johnny Doyle (Scottish footballer) (1951–1981), Scottish footballer for Celtic F.C.

== Others ==
- John Doyle (engineer), American control theorist, professor at California Institute of Technology
- John Doyle (physicist), professor at Harvard
- John Doyle (judge) (born 1945), Chief Justice of South Australia
- John Doyle (police officer) (died 1913), New Zealand police officer killed in the line of duty
- John Andrew Doyle (1844–1907), English historian
- John Doyle (academic, born 1964), professor of politics, international relations, and conflict studies at Dublin City University
- John Doyle (guitarist), Irish guitarist and singer

== See also ==
- John Doyle Group, British civil engineering contractor
- Jack Doyle (disambiguation)
