= Iron Range =

Iron-ore mining districts around Lake Superior in the United States and Canada

Coordinates: 47°27′N 92°56′W

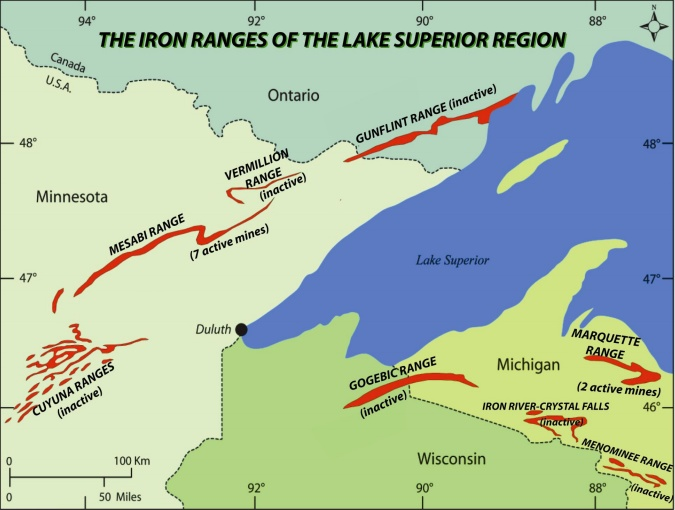
Lake Superior Iron Ranges

The Iron Range (Ojibwe: Misaabewaajiiwing) is collectively or individually a number of elongated iron-ore mining districts around Lake Superior in the United States and Canada. Much of the ore-bearing region lies alongside the range of granite hills formed by the Giants Range batholith. These cherty iron ore deposits are Precambrian in the Vermilion Range and middle Precambrian in the Mesabi and Cuyuna ranges, all in Minnesota. The Gogebic Range in Wisconsin and the Marquette Iron Range and Menominee Range in Michigan have similar characteristics and are of similar age. Natural ores and concentrates were produced from 1848 until the mid-1950s, when taconites and jaspers were concentrated and pelletized, and started to become the major source of iron production.

The mining districts are in Minnesota's Arrowhead Region. The region's far eastern area, containing the Duluth Complex along the shore of Lake Superior, and the far northern area, along the Canada–U.S. border, are not associated with iron ore mining, but deposits of copper, nickel, and cobalt at the northern boundary of the Duluth Complex, where it meets the iron formations, are being considered for mining.

== The Iron Range and its economy ==
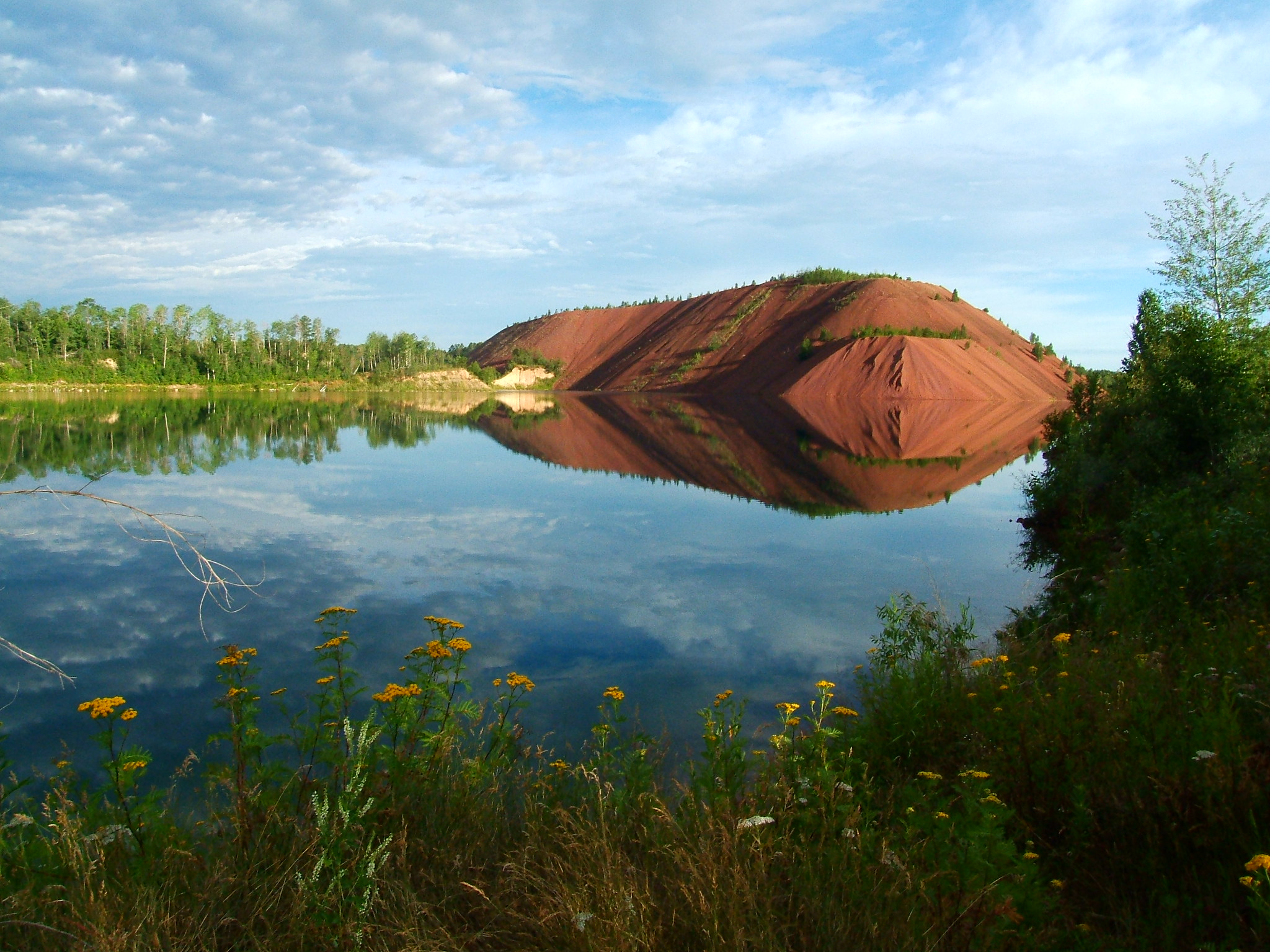
Iron ore

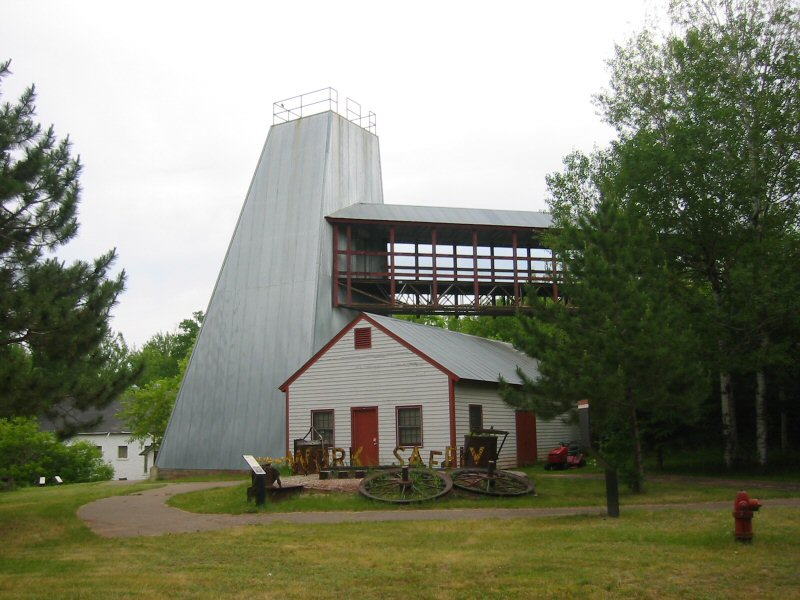
Croft Mine Historic Park

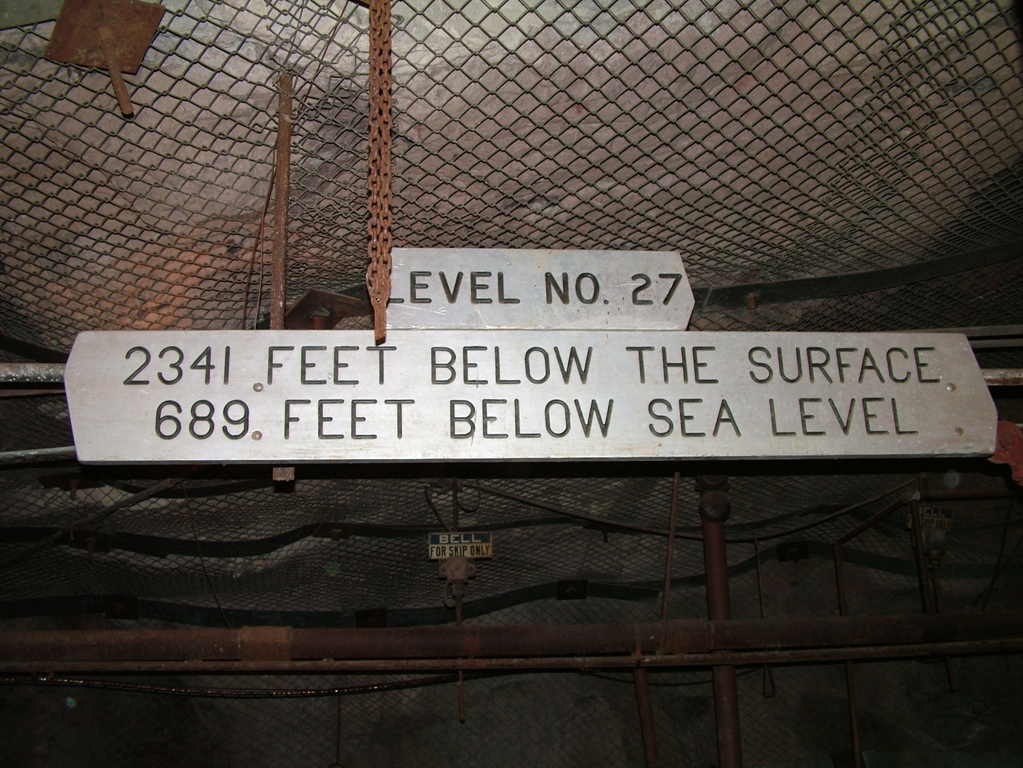
Soudan Underground Mine State Park

From a geological perspective, Minnesota's Iron Range includes these four major iron deposits:

- Mesabi Range, the largest iron range, largely within Itasca and Saint Louis counties;
- Vermilion Range, northeast of the Mesabi, in Saint Louis and Lake counties;
- Gunflint Range, in the extreme northern portion of Cook County and extending into Canada; and
- Cuyuna Range, southwest of the Mesabi, largely within Crow Wing County.

Within Minnesota, "The Iron Range Resources and Rehabilitation is a State Department, established by the legislature of 1941 to render public service through research and the actual development of all the state's resources both natural and human." The Iron Range Resources and Rehabilitation Board (IRRRB), known as "the I-triple-R-B" or Iron Range Resources, is an economic development agency funded partly by state taxes on taconite-producing companies and charged with creating jobs.

There have been attempts to expand mining for other metals to areas near the Iron Range, most notably with the Twin Metals mine, but these have received pushback from the federal government and environmentalists because of environmental concerns resulting from their proximity to national protected lands.

== History ==
Geologically, the Mesabi, Gunflint, and Cuyuna Ranges in Minnesota belong to the Paleoproterozoic Animikie Group, while the Vermilion Range is Neoarchean. The geologic history of the formations containing iron are typical of banded iron formations worldwide.

Before the 19th century, Native American groups mined native copper on the Keweenaw Peninsula. William Austin Burt discovered iron ore in the Marquette Range near Negaunee, Michigan in 1844. Iron ore was discovered on the Menominee Range in 1867 and on the Gogebic Range in 1884. It was first discovered in Minnesota on the Vermilion Range in 1885, the Mesabi Range in 1890, and the Cuyuna Range in 1903.

Underground mines were developed to remove the valuable ore of most ranges. But on the Mesabi and Cuyuna Ranges, iron mining operations evolved into enormous open pit mines, where steamshovels and other industrial machines could remove massive amounts of ore. "Large-scale commercial production of magnetite taconite ore on the Mesabi Range started in 1956 at the Peter Mitchell Mine near Babbitt, Minnesota."

== Cities and towns ==
Some of the more significant communities in the region include:

- Aitkin (pop. 2,165) is on the Cuyuna Range's eastern edge.
- Aurora (pop. 1,853) is on the Eastern Mesabi Range. The former St. James, Meadow, Miller and Stephens mines lie within the city limits.
- Babbitt (pop. 1,475)
- Biwabik (pop. 969)
- Bovey (pop. 804) is along U.S. Highway 169 between Coleraine and Taconite.
- Buhl (pop. 1,000) is along U.S. Highway 169 between Chisholm and Virginia.
- Chisholm (pop. 4,976) is the Mesabi Range's geographic center.
- Coleraine (pop. 1,970) has been called the "start place of the Iron Range."
- Crosby (pop. 2,386) is an old mining boomtown on the Iron Range's southwestern edge.
- Deerwood (pop. 529) Mining engineer Cuyler Adams discovered the Cuyuna Range near Deerwood in 1895.
- Ely (pop. 3,460), in the Vermillion Range, the most popular entry point for the Boundary Waters Canoe Area Wilderness.
- Eveleth (pop. 3,718) Home of the U.S. Hockey Hall of Fame
- Grand Rapids (pop. 10,869) is named for the local rapids in the Mississippi River, now the site of the UPM paper mill.
- Gilbert (pop. 1,799) is the location of Lake Ore-be-gone, an artificial lake created by flooding three open-pit iron ore mines.
- Hibbing (pop. 16,361) is the largest city by area in the state of Minnesota. It is home to the Hull–Rust–Mahoning Open Pit Iron Mine, one of the world's largest open pit iron mines.
- Hoyt Lakes (pop. 1,888) is in the eastern Mesabi Range. Erie Mining Company previously mined ore and testing to mine new minerals is ongoing.
- Keewatin (pop. 1,068) is between Nashwauk and Hibbing. It is home to U.S. Steel's KeeTac taconite mining and processing plant.
- Kinney (pop. 169) is an old mining boomtown on the Iron Range, between Buhl and Mountain Iron.
- Mountain Iron (pop. 2,869) is home to Minntac, the world's largest taconite processing plant.
- Nashwauk (pop. 983) is a small town between Grand Rapids and Hibbing, 4 miles from Keewatin.
- Soudan is an unincorporated community in Breitung Township, Saint Louis County immediately east of the city of Tower on Minn.Highway 169 / Minn.Highway 1. It is the home of the Soudan Underground Mine State Park, which contained the University of Minnesota's Soudan Underground Laboratory, which housed detectors, including MINOS, over 700 meters below the Earth's surface.
- Taconite (pop. 360), named after the taconite pellets from iron ore, was a town many miners lived in.
- Virginia (pop. 8,712) is next to the Rouchleau mine pit, which is nearly three miles long, half a mile wide and 450 feet deep. The state's tallest bridge crosses the pit.
- Winton (pop 172). Once several times larger than Ely, Winton sits just 3 miles north of Ely, and was once home to a very large lumber mill and a lumber boomtown.

Nearby communities important to the Iron Range:

- Duluth (pop. 86,265) The fourth largest city in the state, is a destination for much of the ore shipped via the DM&IR railroad and loaded onto Lake freighters. A large part of the Iron Range is also included in the Duluth MN-WI MSA.
- Grand Marais (pop. 1,351) The area was a bustling fur trading station since the 1700s, and the French voyageurs called the settled village Grand Marais ("Great Marsh"), referring to a marsh that in early fur-trading times was 20 acres (8.1 ha) or less in area, nearly at the level of Lake Superior, and situated at the head of the little bay and harbor that led to the settlement of the village. The town comprises much of the Gunflint Trail, which extends to the former Paulson Mine site.
- Silver Bay (pop 1,857) is home to the plant that processes taconite from Babbitt.
- Two Harbors (pop. 3,745) is the county seat of Lake County, along the shore of Lake Superior. It was historically an important port for loading and shipping iron ore from the Range.

== Culture ==
Immigrants from over 23 countries settled the area, drawn to the mining industry. By 1910 the Finns were the largest immigrant group, followed by Slovenes and Croats from the Austrian Empire, and Italians and Swedes. Over time the area developed a strong "Ranger" culture and accent. This northern Minnesota accent is still present in the area, especially among older people; hence the popular nickname "da Range".

The regional culture is strongly linked to former periods of steady, usually well-paid mining employment, although in recent decades, the region's outdoor recreation and relative remoteness has attracted new residents unconnected to the industry. There are tensions between supporters and detractors of mining, especially over the potential reuse of ironworks to exploit copper ores. Bob Dylan, who grew up in Hibbing, memorialized the Iron Range in the 1963 song "North Country Blues", a lament portraying hard times in the region. Presented in his 1964 album The Times They Are a-Changin', it includes such lines as:

So the mining gates locked and the red iron rotted
And the room smelled heavy from drinking
When the sad, silent song made the hour twice as long
As I waited for the sun to go sinking

The Iron Range cuisine is known for Cornish pasties stuffed with a combination of beef, rutabaga, onion, carrots, and potatoes. Pasties were an easy lunch for those working deep in the iron mines. Slovenian and Croatian immigrants brought the honey-nut bread potica to the Iron Range; it is still served on Easter and Christmas in northern Minnesota.

Ice hockey is a predominant sport in the region, which has produced several NHL players as well as the three members of the "Iron Range line" from the 1980 United States men's national ice hockey team that defeated the Soviet Union team in the "Miracle on Ice" game. In 2022, Hockeyland, a documentary focusing on high school hockey in the Iron Range and Duluth area was released.

== Politics ==
Presidential election results (seven core counties)
Year	Democratic	Republican	Others
2024	50.7% 98,646	47.2% 91,715	2.1% 4,152
2020	51.9% 100,997	45.8% 89,032	2.3% 4,387
2016	47.6% 85,673	43.8% 78,884	8.6% 15,465
2012	60.7% 111,518	36.7% 67,422	2.6% 4,747
2008	62.0% 116,749	35.6% 67,027	2.3% 4,411
2004	61.7% 116,856	37.0% 70,024	1.3% 2,521
2000	56.2% 94,923	36.5% 61,581	7.3% 12,277
1996	58.1% 91,333	27.5% 43,194	14.5% 22,749
1992	53.7% 90,464	24.3% 40,901	22.0% 37,034
1988	65.0% 102,348	34.0% 53,552	1.0% 1,631
1984	65.2% 112,105	34.0% 58,455	0.9% 1,497
1980	58.2% 102,952	32.2% 56,925	9.6% 16,975
1976	64.6% 110,411	32.2% 55,064	3.2% 5,518
1972	56.4% 87,367	42.0% 64,982	1.6% 2,550
1968	69.2% 104,151	26.9% 40,457	3.9% 5,806
1964	75.3% 116,567	24.4% 37,734	0.3% 520
1960	62.0% 99,703	37.5% 60,283	0.5% 801

The area has remained a Democratic-Farmer-Labor Party stronghold despite its predominantly white and rural population because of its history of a largely unionized workforce in the mining industry, the mainstay of the economy of the Iron Range. In 2004, John Kerry carried most of the counties in the region by a comfortable margin over George W. Bush. Barack Obama outperformed McCain in 2008, carrying every county in the Range. The area was the largest rural Democratic stronghold in Minnesota outside of the urban centers in Minneapolis and St. Paul.

In 2016, Donald Trump's economic policies changed the Range's electoral profile. He won multiple counties, reduced past Democratic winning margins and received endorsements from local Democratic mayors. In the 2022 midterm elections, the Democratic-Farmer-Labor party lost more ground on the Iron Range, with Republican candidates running for lower-profile statewide offices flipping Carlton County. In the state legislature, Republicans picked up several seats on the Range despite losing both chambers overall. Nevertheless, the Range as a whole still votes slightly in favor of Democratic presidential nominees due to their high margins in Duluth, the range's most populous city.

== Climate ==
The region is known for harsh winters and pleasant summers. The average year-round temperature is in the 30s °F (between about 2 °C and 4 °C). Temperatures below −40 °F/°C occur somewhere in the region during most winters. The Midwestern Regional Climate Center climate summaries record that Virginia has a mean annual temperature of 38 °F, with an average January low temperature of −6.2 °F (about −21 °C) and July high of 77.4 °F (25 °C). Precipitation there averages 27 in (690 mm) annually and snowfall 53.2 in (135 cm).

== See also ==
- Geology of Minnesota
- Mesaba Railway
- Stromatolite
