= John Boyle =

John Boyle may refer to:

== Arts and entertainment ==
- John J. Boyle (sculptor) (1851–1917), American sculptor
- John W. Boyle (1891–1959), American cinematographer
- John Boyle (artist) (born 1941), Canadian painter
- Johnny Boyle (fl. 2000s), Irish drummer in band The Frames

== Nobility ==
- John Boyle, 2nd Earl of Glasgow (1688–1740), Scottish nobleman
- John Boyle, 5th Earl of Cork (1707–1762), Irish author and nobleman
- John Boyle, 3rd Earl of Glasgow (1714–1775), Scottish nobleman
- John Boyle, 14th Earl of Cork (1916–2003), Irish peer
- John Boyle, 15th Earl of Cork (born 1945), Irish peer

== Politics and law ==
- John Boyle (fl. 1417), English politician, MP for Worcester
- John Boyle (congressman) (1774–1835), American politician and judge, U.S. Representative from Kentucky
- John Boyle (Northern Ireland politician) (1869–1950), Northern Irish politician
- John Boyle (MP) (1803–1874), British politician in Ireland
- John Robert Boyle (1871–1936), Canadian politician
- John Boyle Jr. (1876–1936), Irish-American lawyer and politician
- John J. Boyle (attorney) (1884–1944), United States Attorney
- John Patrick Boyle (1880–1968), American lawyer and politician
- John Boyle (1980- ), Commissioner of the Alaska Department of Natural Resources since 2023

== Sports ==
- Jack Boyle (John Anthony Boyle, 1866–1913), American baseball player
- Johnny Boyle (Gaelic footballer) (1931–2017), Irish Gaelic footballer
- John Boyle (wrestler) (born 1934), Australian Olympic wrestler
- John Boyle (footballer, born 1946), Scottish footballer (Chelsea, Tampa Bay Rowdies)
- John Boyle (footballer, born 1986), Scottish footballer (Airdrie)

== Others ==
- John Boyle (bishop) (c. 1563–1620), English Protestant bishop in Ireland
- John Boyle (trade unionist), Irish trade union leader
- John Andrew Boyle (1916–1978), British Orientalist and historian
- John J. Boyle (printer) (1919–2003), Public Printer of the United States
- John F. Boyle Jr., American murderer

== See also ==
- Jack Boyle (disambiguation)
- John Boyle O'Reilly (1844–1890), Irish-born poet and novelist
