= Jack Doyle =

Jack Doyle may refer to:

- Jack Doyle (baseball) (1869–1958), Irish-American first baseman in Major League Baseball
- Jack Doyle (boxing promoter) (1877–1944), American entrepreneur
- Jack Doyle (boxer) (1913–1978), Irish boxer, actor, and tenor
- Jack Doyle (rugby union) (1915–1998), Irish rugby union player
- Jack Doyle (equestrian) (born 1958), Irish Olympic equestrian
- Jack Doyle (journalist), British journalist
- Jack Doyle (American football) (born 1990), American football tight end
- Jack Doyle (footballer) (born 1997), English footballer
- Jack Doyle (horse), 1998 winner of the Scilly Isles Novices' Chase

== See also ==
- Jack Boyle (disambiguation)
- John Doyle (disambiguation)
