= Quad Cities (disambiguation) =

The Quad Cities is a region of cities on the border of the U.S. states of Iowa and Illinois.

Quad Cities may also refer to:

== Geography ==
- Florence-Muscle Shoals Metropolitan Area, in Alabama, United States
- Quad Cities Metropolitan Area, the metropolitan area associated with the Quad Cities in Iowa and Illinois
- Quad Cities (Minnesota), the cities of Virginia, Eveleth, Gilbert, and Mountain Iron in Minnesota, United States
- Quad Cities (Arizona), Prescott, Arizona in the United States, and nearby cities

== Other uses ==
- Quad Cities (train), a planned Amtrak train to the Iowa-Illinois Quad Cities
- Quad Cities Rocket, a defunct Chicago, Rock Island and Pacific Railroad train to the Iowa-Illinois Quad Cities
- Quad City DJ's, an American hip-hop music group
- Quad Cities Nuclear Generating Station, an Illinois nuclear power plant
