= OHV =

OHV may refer to:

- Overhead valve engine
- Off-highway vehicle, aka off-road vehicle
- Off-roading
- California State Parks, Off-Highway Motor Vehicle Recreation Division

- El Mirage Off-Highway Vehicle Recreation Area at El Mirage Lake
- Off Highway Vehicle division hidden fund controversy

- Iron Range Off-Highway Vehicle State Recreation Area
