= Quad Cities (Minnesota) =

Region in Minnesota, USA

Coordinates: 47°31′24″N 92°32′12″W

The Quad Cities in the U.S. state of Minnesota are Virginia, Eveleth, Gilbert, and Mountain Iron in the Arrowhead Region, overlapping the Iron Range region, Duluth MN-WI MSA, and Saint Louis County.

U.S. Highway 53, U.S. Highway 169, State Highway 37 (MN 37), and State Highway 135 (MN 135) are four of the main routes in the Quad Cities.

== History ==
The Quad Cities were founded in the 1890s and early 1900s, during the boom of the mining industry. Many of the mines shut down during the Great Depression and did not resume work until World War II.

== Populations ==
According to the 2000 census, the Quad Cities had a population of 17,868, with 9,157 in Virginia, 3,865 in Eveleth, 2,999 in Mountain Iron, and 1,847 in Gilbert. As of 2020, the Quad Cities' population had declined to 16,479. 92.1% of the population is non-Hispanic white, 97.2% primarily speak English, and 18.4% have a Bachelor's degree or more.

== Economy and industry ==
The mining industry is declining in the area. There is a new focus on tourism and healthcare.

== Things to do ==
Outdoor activities, shopping, and a local historical attraction celebrating hockey are among the most common pastimes available in Virginia and the surrounding area. Swimming and boating are available at many lakes and pits around the Range. The Range has several hiking, biking, and four-wheeling paths. Snowmobile paths with easy access and ice rinks are also available in the region. The Thunderbird Mall in Virginia, downtown shops in each community, and shopping in Mountain Iron serve as activity options. The United States Hockey Hall of Fame, a museum celebrating prominent hockey players with history displays and a model rink, is in Eveleth.
