= Jack Boyle (disambiguation) =

Jack Boyle (1866–1913) was an American catcher and first baseman in Major League Baseball.

Jack Boyle may also refer to:

- Jack Boyle (academic administrator) (born 1941), former vice-president of Cleveland State
- Jack Boyle (cricketer) (born 1996), New Zealand cricketer
- Jack Boyle (footballer) (born 1990), footballer from Jersey
- Jack Boyle (third baseman) (1889–1971), Major League Baseball third baseman
- Jack Boyle (rugby union), Irish rugby union player
- Captain Jack Boyle, a character in the 1924 Seán O'Casey play Juno and the Paycock
- Jack Boyle, author of the 1914 to 1920 Boston Blackie stories
- Jack Boyle, a character in the American television series Blue Bloods

== See also ==
- John Boyle (disambiguation)
- Jack Doyle (disambiguation)
