= Iron Range Off-Highway Vehicle State Recreation Area =

State park in Minnesota, US

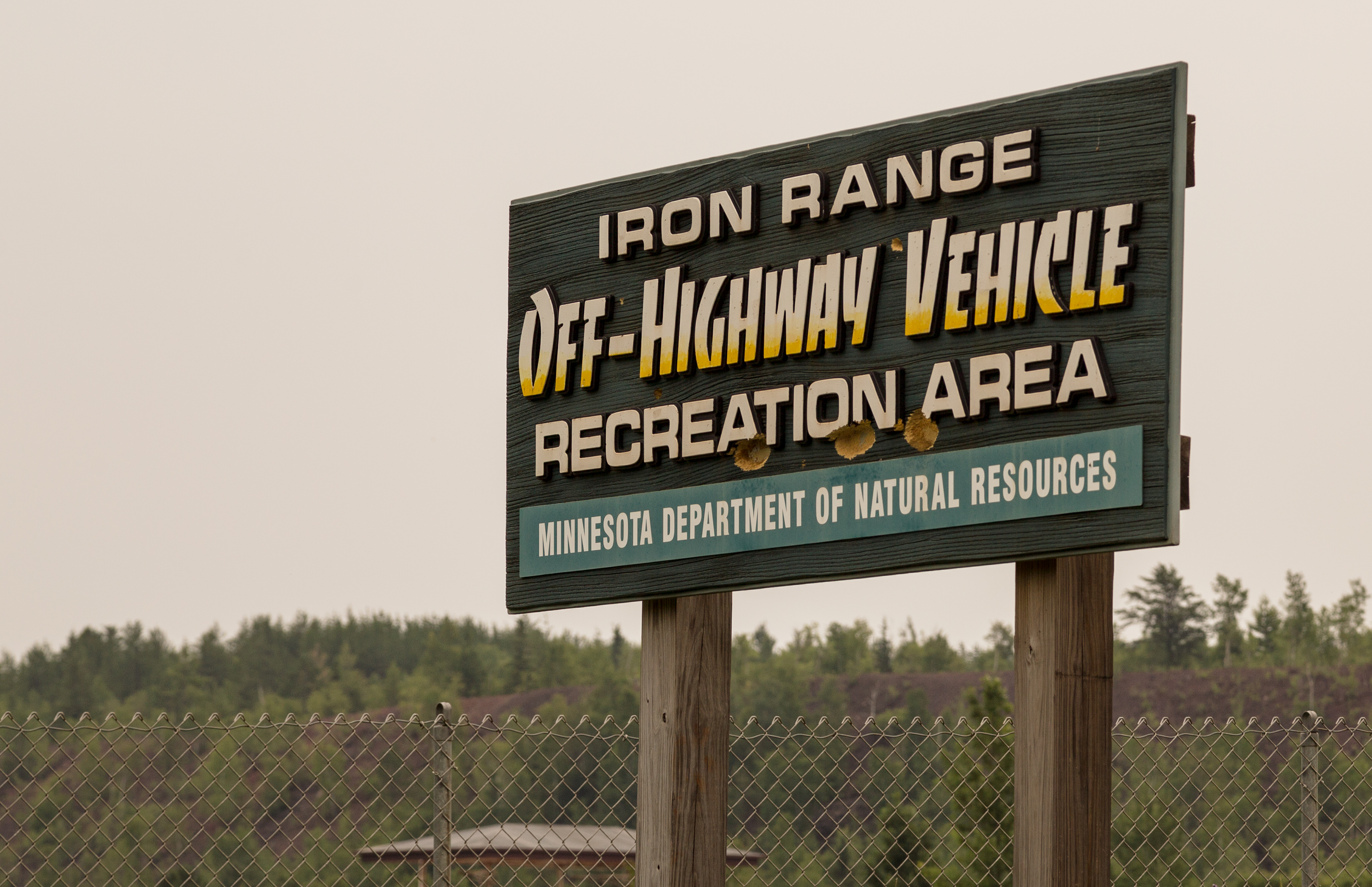

- Location within Minnesota Location within the United States
- Location: St. Louis, Minnesota, United States
- Coordinates: 47°48′24.7″N 92°44′34.9″W
- Area: 1,864 acres (7.54 km^{2})
- Established: 2002
- Governing body: Minnesota Department of Natural Resources

Iron Range Off-Highway Vehicle State Recreation Area is a Minnesota state park located east of Lake Ore-be-gone in Gilbert, Minnesota. The recreation area consists of 36 miles (58 km) of trails on a 1,864-acre (754 ha) unit, all of which was local iron ore mining land until 1981. A 3,500-acre (1,400 ha) expansion of the recreation area is also being planned, with land acquisition underway.

The recreation area has trails for all classes of off-highway vehicles defined by the Minnesota Department of Natural Resources, including Off-Highway Motorcycles, Class I All-Terrain Vehicles, Class II All-Terrain Vehicles, and Off-Road Vehicles.

Minnesota is one of three states to have a state-maintained off-road recreation area, the others being California and Utah.
