= William R. Ojala =

American politician

Member of the Minnesota House of Representatives
- In office January 4, 1971 – January 5, 1975
- Preceded by: Multi-member district
- Succeeded by: Joseph Begich
- Constituency: 62nd district (1971–1972); 6A district (1973–1975)

Personal details
- Born: January 23, 1925 Eveleth, Minnesota, U.S.
- Died: January 6, 2018 (aged 92)
- Party: Democratic
- Occupation: lawyer

Military service
- Allegiance: United States
- Branch/service: United States Marine Corps
- Years of service: 1942 – 1945
- Battles/wars: World War II

William R. "Bill" Ojala (January 23, 1925 – January 6, 2018) was an American politician and lawyer.

Born in Eveleth, Minnesota, Ojala served in the United States Marine Corps during World War II. He then received his bachelor's degree from University of Minnesota and his law degree from William Mitchell College of Law. He practiced law in Aurora, Minnesota. Ojala served on the school board and as county commissioner for St. Louis County, Minnesota. Ojala served in the Minnesota House of Representatives as a Democrat from 1971 to 1974. In 1974, Ojala ran for the United States House of Representatives and lost the election.

Ojala died on January 6, 2018, at the age of 92.
