= Arrowhead Region =

Region in northeastern Minnesota

Coordinates: 48°N 91°W

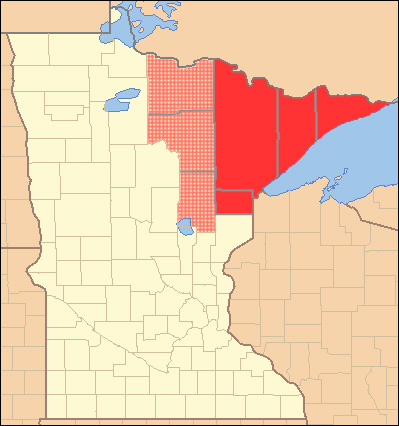
Map of the Arrowhead Region

The Arrowhead Region is located in the northeastern part of the U.S. state of Minnesota, so called because of its pointed shape. The predominantly rural region encompasses 10,635.26 square miles (27,545.2 km^{2}) of land area and includes Carlton, Cook, Lake and Saint Louis counties. Its population at the 2000 census was 248,425 residents. The region is loosely defined, and Aitkin, Itasca, and Koochiching counties are sometimes considered as part of the region, increasing the land area to 18,221.97 square miles (47,194.7 km^{2}) and the population to 322,073 residents. Primary industries in the region include tourism, particularly ecotourism focused on the region's natural areas, and iron mining.

The area is one of several distinct regions of Minnesota. The region's largest cities are Duluth, Hibbing, Cloquet, Virginia, Grand Rapids, Hermantown, and International Falls.

== Waterways ==
The Arrowhead Region contains three watersheds: the Lake Superior Basin, the Mississippi River Basin, and the Hudson Bay (Rainy River) Basin. A unique geological feature is a point north of Hibbing, MN, where water has the potential to flow any one of three ways. The only other North American location where this phenomenon occurs is Glacier National Park in Montana.

Waterways have played an important role in the history of the Arrowhead Region. The delineation of the United States and Canadian borders used the Pigeon and Rainy Rivers and numerous other connected waterways as the boundary. This same route has been used for centuries by fur traders for the transportation of furs, trade goods, communication, and ideas. Another significant water trade route to the interior is the St. Louis River. This route could be followed to the present day Mesabi Iron Range or could be transferred to the Mississippi River using the historic Savannah Portage. These two waterways made up the main routes from Lake Superior to the "interior," or lands west of the Great Lakes.

Minnesota Arrowhead Region 1941-42 (WPA)

== Etymology ==
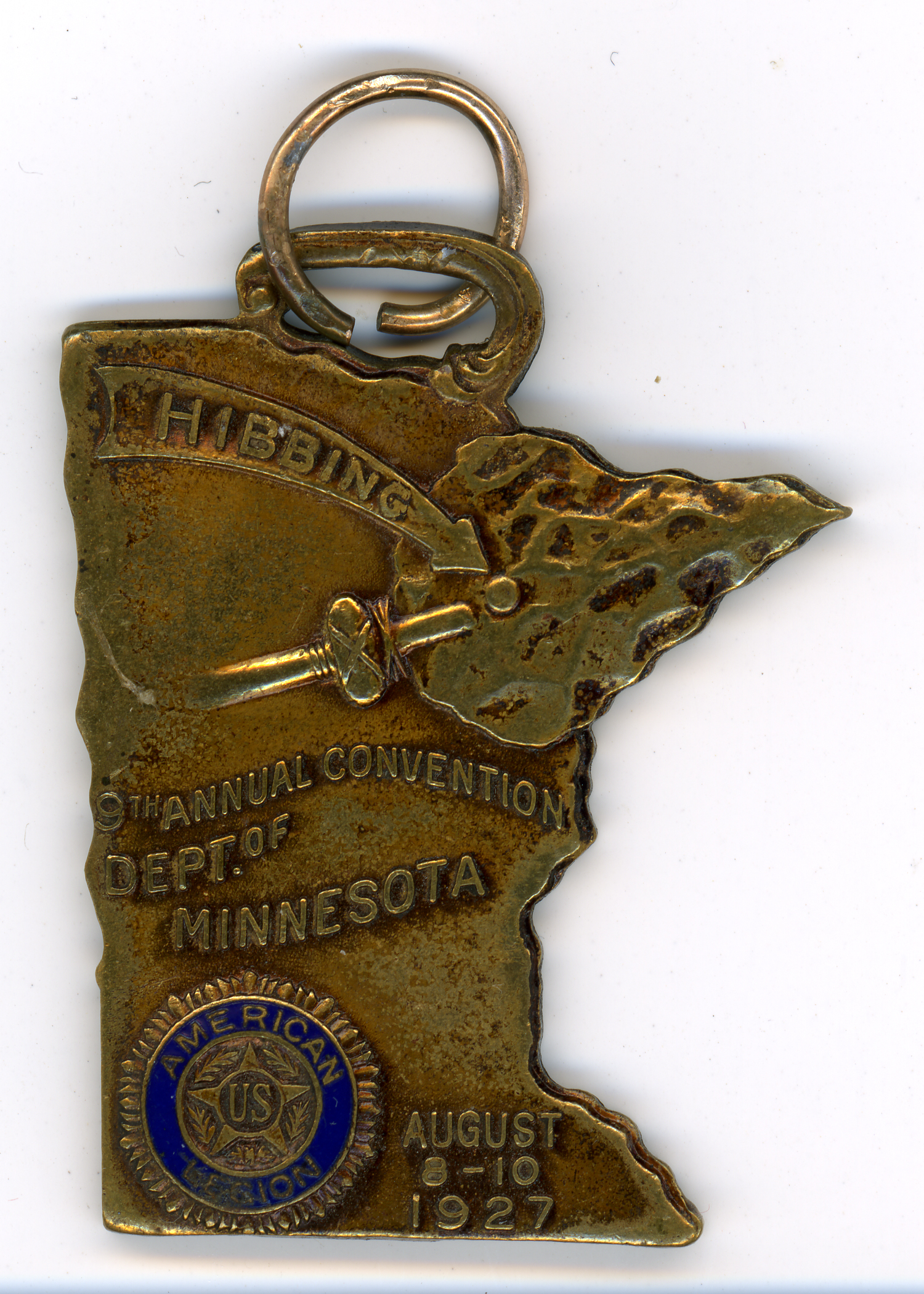
American Legion Conference, Hibbing, Minnesota 1927

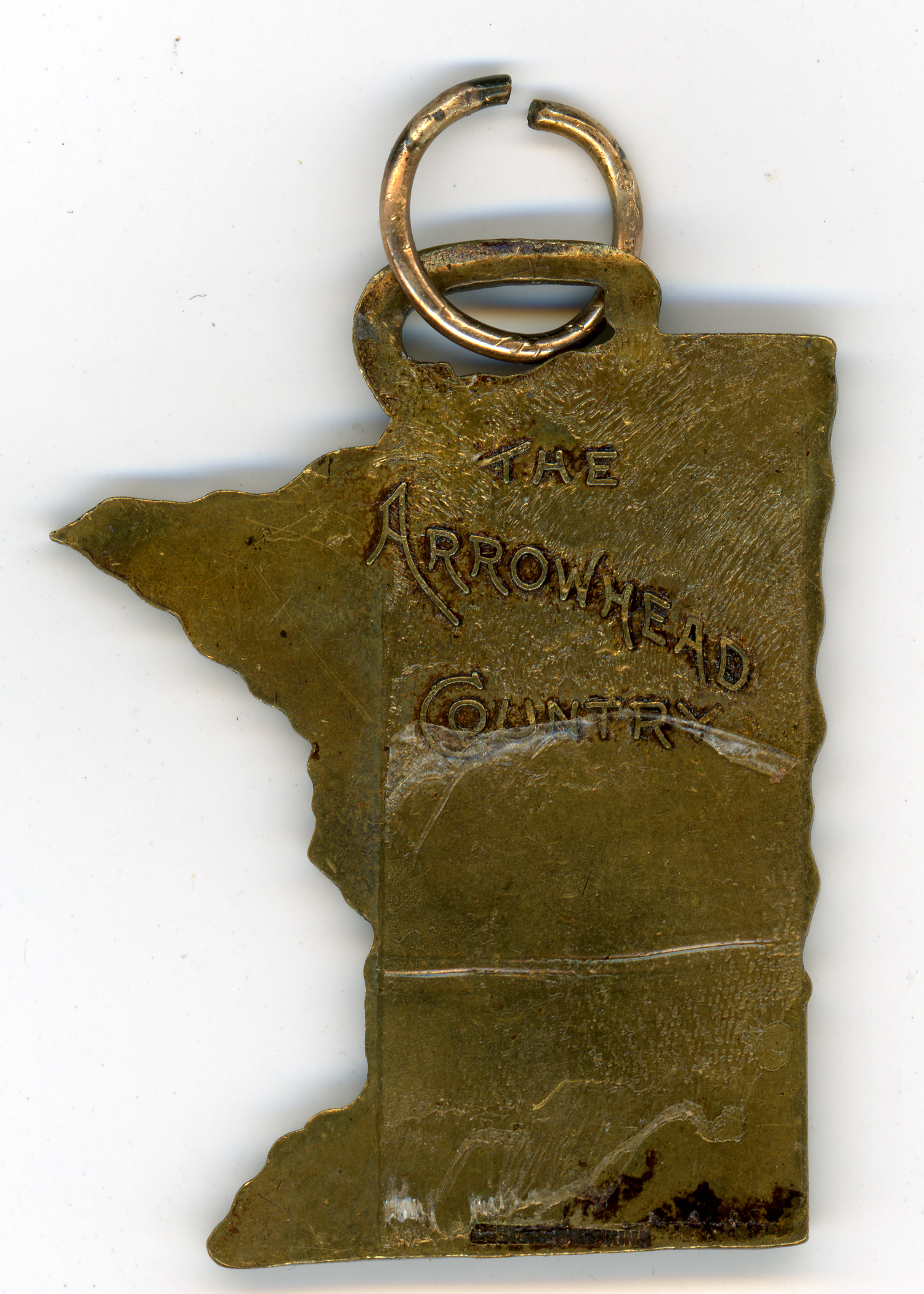
American Legion Conference, Hibbing, Minnesota 1927, reverse

A 1925 map of Northeastern Minnesota, created by the A & E Supply Company of Duluth, mentions the Arrowhead Region.

The term "The Arrowhead Country" appeared on a medal for the American Legion's 9th Annual Convention in Minnesota, taking place from August 8–10, 1927 in Hibbing. The reverse reads "The Arrowhead Country". The medal, made of a cupreous metal, is in the shape of Minnesota with a Native American style projectile point ("Arrowhead") covering the northeastern portion of the state.

A 1929 map titled "The Arrowhead of Minnesota" illustrates a stylized representation of important aspects in Northeastern Minnesota history, including geology and iron mining. It was published by the Hibbing branch of the American Association of University Women.

== Delineation ==
A 1924 contest to name the then-unnamed region defined the region as "all or parts of the following counties: Cook, Lake, St. Louis, Carlton, Itasca, Aitkin, Koochiching, Beltrami, Crow Wing, Hubbard, and Cass."

The region is often defined as the counties of northeastern Minnesota. Occasionally, Douglas County, in the northwestern part of Wisconsin, is included in modern maps or definitions. The three main of the region are St. Louis, Lake, and Cook counties in Minnesota. These three are the northeasternmost counties in the state. When an expanded definition is made, it often includes all or parts of Koochiching, Itasca, and Carlton counties of Minnesota — the other counties adjacent to St. Louis County to the west and south.

The most far reaching definitions, either on maps or in description, include Beltrami, Crow Wing, Hubbard, and Cass counties. These are all to the west or southwest of St. Louis, Lake, and Cook counties.

Other attempts at geographically defining the Arrowhead have use land cover and vegetation type, hydrology, and resource extraction (logging and mining), as well as trying to make the defined area fit into a generalized arrowhead shape.

== Economy ==
The Arrowhead Region is quite rugged and dotted with thousands of lakes surrounded by boreal forest, and is home to Voyageurs National Park, the Boundary Waters Canoe Area Wilderness, and the Superior Hiking Trail, which lie amidst the Superior National Forest. The Arrowhead also contains Minnesota's only mountain range, the Sawtooth Mountains. For these reasons, a large portion of the economy depends on tourism—the region is a common vacation destination for residents of the Minneapolis–Saint Paul metropolitan region.

The other primary portion of the Arrowhead economy is the iron mining industry. Taconite is mined on the Mesabi Range, shipped by train to Duluth, Silver Bay, and Two Harbors, and shipped by freighter from these ports to major metropolitan areas farther down the Great Lakes such as Chicago, Detroit, and Cleveland. In the first half of the 20th century, iron was also mined on the Vermilion Range.

== Politics ==
The Arrowhead Region is very receptive towards candidates from the Democratic Party in federal and statewide elections. None of the four main counties in the region had voted for a Republican presidential candidate since Cook County voted for George W. Bush in 2000, until Carlton County voted for Donald Trump in 2024. While the region still leans Democratic, it has become more competitive since 2016, with Republicans getting over 40% of the vote in every single county except for Cook County in every election after 2016.

== See also ==
- Glacial history of Minnesota
- Iron Range
- The Quad Cities
