= Gilbert, Minnesota =

City in Minnesota, United States

Gilbert
- City
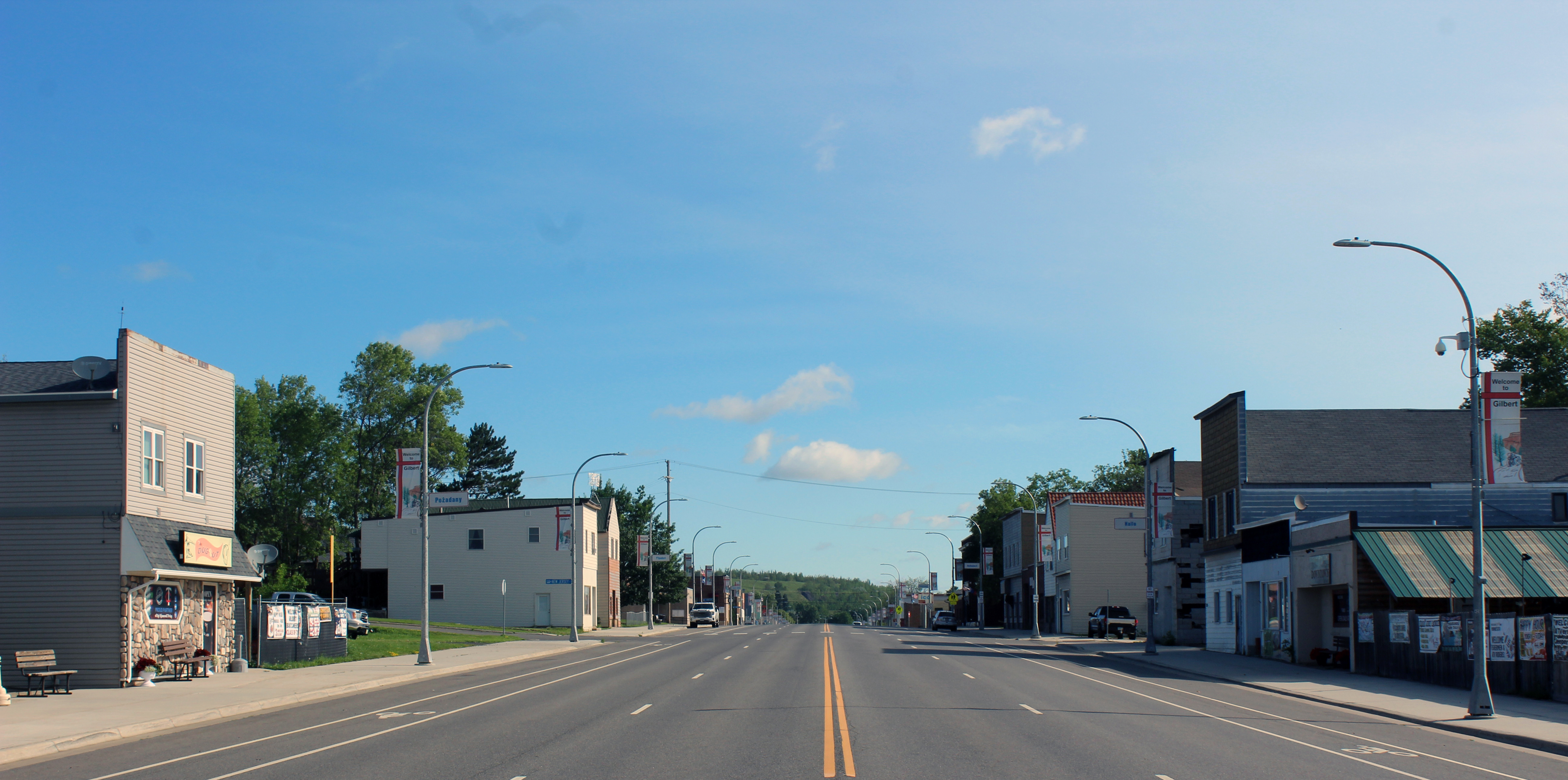
- Commercial business district, S. Broadway

- Location of the city of Gilbert within Saint Louis County, Minnesota
- Coordinates: 47°29′5″N 92°27′58″W
- Country: United States
- State: Minnesota
- County: Saint Louis

Government
  - Mayor: Karl Oberstar Jr.

Area
  - Total: 12.42 sq mi (32.16 km^{2})
  - Land: 11.68 sq mi (30.25 km^{2})
  - Water: 0.74 sq mi (1.92 km^{2})
- Elevation: 1,529 ft (466 m)

Population (2020)
  - Total: 1,687
  - Density: 144.5/sq mi (55.78/km^{2})
- Time zone: UTC-6 (Central (CST))
  - Summer (DST): UTC-5 (CDT)
- ZIP code: 55741
- Area code: 218
- FIPS code: 27-23714
- GNIS feature ID: 0661356
- Website: www.gilbertmn.org

Gilbert is a city in St. Louis County, Minnesota, United States. The population was 1,687 at the 2020 census. State Highway 37 (MN 37) and State Highway 135 (MN 135) are two of the main routes in Gilbert. Gilbert is part of the Quad Cities, with Virginia, Eveleth, and Mountain Iron. The city is named for either Giles Gilbert, who led the exploration of the McKinley mine property in the 1890s, or E. A. Gilbert, a Duluth businessman.

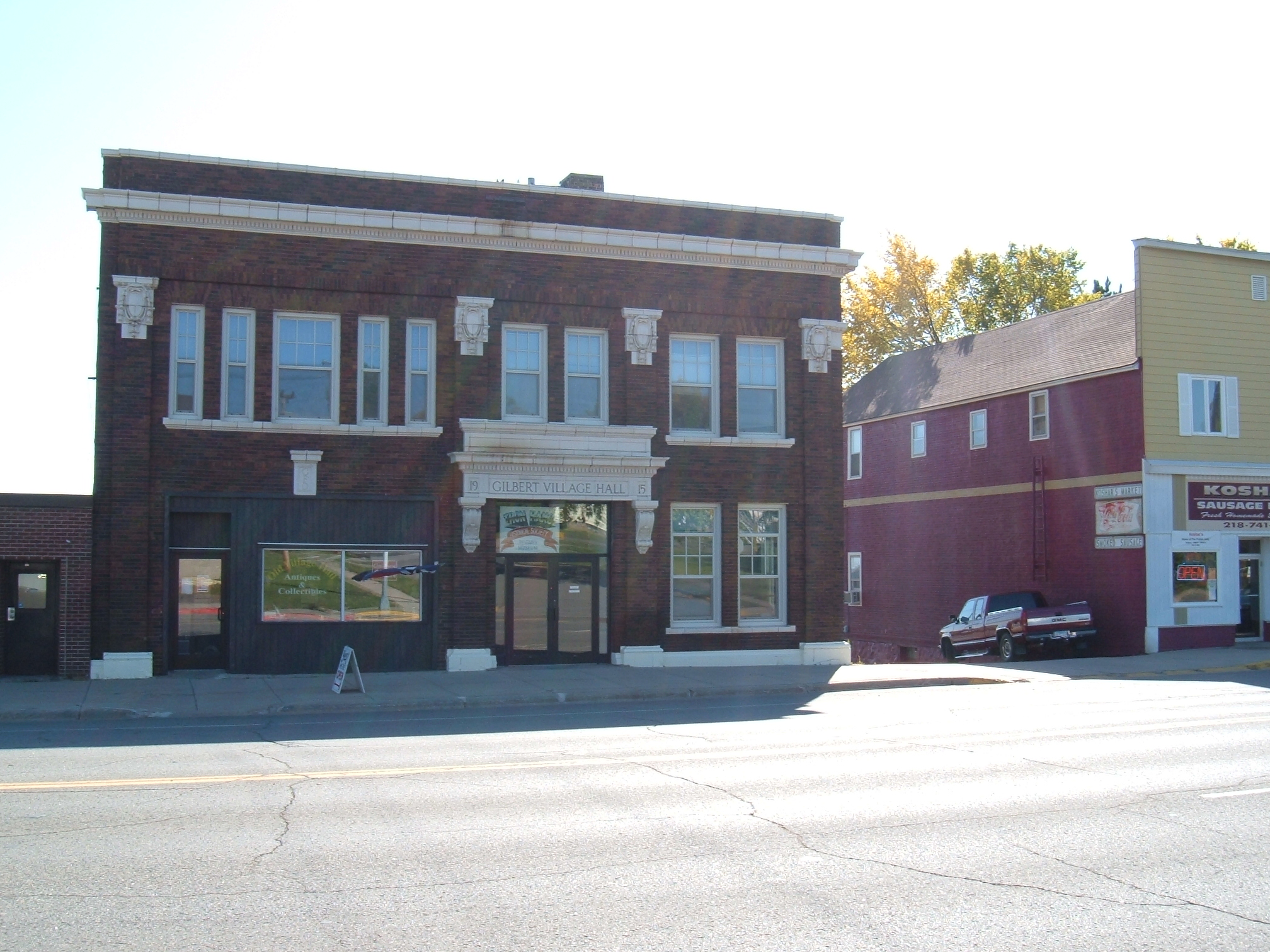
Gilbert Village Hall

== History ==
Gilbert was platted in 1907. A post office has been in operation at Gilbert since 1907.

== Recreation ==
Gilbert is home to one of Minnesota's best-known OHV parks. The Iron Range Off-Highway Vehicle State Recreation Area consists of 1,200 acres (5 km^{2}) of land with 36 miles (58 km) of trails.

Gilbert is also the location of Lake Ore-be-gone, a former mining pit now used for fishing.

== Geography ==
According to the United States Census Bureau, the city has an area of 12.69 square miles (32.87 km^{2}); 11.86 square miles (30.72 km^{2}) is land and 0.83 square miles (2.15 km^{2}) is water.

== Demographics ==
Historical population
Census	Pop.	Note	%±
1910	1,700		—
1920	3,510		106.5%
1930	2,722		−22.5%
1940	2,504		−8.0%
1950	2,247		−10.3%
1960	2,591		15.3%
1970	2,287		−11.7%
1980	2,721		19.0%
1990	1,934		−28.9%
2000	1,847		−4.5%
2010	1,799		−2.6%
2020	1,687		−6.2%
U.S. Decennial Census; 2013 Estimate

=== 2020 census ===
As of the 2020 census, Gilbert had a population of 1,687. The median age was 44.7 years. 21.4% of residents were under the age of 18 and 22.3% of residents were 65 years of age or older. For every 100 females there were 91.3 males, and for every 100 females age 18 and over there were 94.1 males age 18 and over.

0.0% of residents lived in urban areas, while 100.0% lived in rural areas.

There were 763 households in Gilbert, of which 24.0% had children under the age of 18 living in them. Of all households, 41.9% were married-couple households, 21.6% were households with a male householder and no spouse or partner present, and 27.4% were households with a female householder and no spouse or partner present. About 37.1% of all households were made up of individuals and 17.5% had someone living alone who was 65 years of age or older.

There were 861 housing units, of which 11.4% were vacant. The homeowner vacancy rate was 0.8% and the rental vacancy rate was 8.8%.

Racial composition as of the 2020 census
Race	Number	Percent
White	1,591	94.3%
Black or African American	2	0.1%
American Indian and Alaska Native	17	1.0%
Asian	7	0.4%
Native Hawaiian and Other Pacific Islander	0	0.0%
Some other race	8	0.5%
Two or more races	62	3.7%
Hispanic or Latino (of any race)	28	1.7%

=== 2010 census ===
As of the census of 2010, there were 1,799 people, 835 households, and 486 families living in the city. The population density was 151.7 inhabitants per square mile (58.6/km^{2}). There were 937 housing units at an average density of 79.0 per square mile (30.5/km^{2}). The racial makeup of the city was 96.8% White, 0.2% African American, 1.0% Native American, 0.2% Asian, 0.1% Pacific Islander, 0.2% from other races, and 1.6% from two or more races. Hispanic or Latino of any race were 0.8% of the population.

There were 835 households, of which 25.4% had children under the age of 18 living with them, 43.8% were married couples living together, 9.8% had a female householder with no husband present, 4.6% had a male householder with no wife present, and 41.8% were non-families. 38.0% of all households were made up of individuals, and 17% had someone living alone who was 65 years of age or older. The average household size was 2.15 and the average family size was 2.82.

The median age in the city was 44.7 years. 21.8% of residents were under the age of 18; 4.7% were between the ages of 18 and 24; 23.8% were from 25 to 44; 31.8% were from 45 to 64; and 17.8% were 65 years of age or older. The gender makeup of the city was 48.6% male and 51.4% female.

=== 2000 census ===
As of the 2000 census, there were 1,847 people, 842 households, and 495 families living in the city. The population density was 156.7 inhabitants per square mile (60.5/km^{2}). There were 900 housing units at an average density of 76.3 per square mile (29.5/km^{2}). The racial makeup of the city was 98.21% White, 0.22% African American, 0.49% Native American, 0.27% Asian, and 0.81% from two or more races. Hispanic or Latino of any race were 0.38% of the population. 18.9% were of Finnish, 13.9% Slovene, 13.8% German, 8.0% Norwegian, 7.3% Italian and 5.8% Swedish ancestry.

There were 842 households, out of which 24.2% had children under the age of 18 living with them, 46.2% were married couples living together, 8.3% had a female householder with no husband present, and 41.2% were non-families. 37.3% of all households were made up of individuals, and 19.7% had someone living alone who was 65 years of age or older. The average household size was 2.19 and the average family size was 2.88.

In the city, the population was spread out, with 21.1% under the age of 18, 8.0% from 18 to 24, 25.6% from 25 to 44, 23.8% from 45 to 64, and 21.6% who were 65 years of age or older. The median age was 42 years. For every 100 females, there were 97.5 males. For every 100 females age 18 and over, there were 94.4 males.

The median income for a household in the city was $35,859, and the median income for a family was $44,931. Males had a median income of $40,625 versus $19,333 for females. The per capita income for the city was $17,407. About 9.0% of families and 13.2% of the population were below the poverty line, including 17.3% of those under age 18 and 12.1% of those age 65 or over.

== Notes ==
- The town was once known as the red light district of the Iron Range, and planned a Whorehouse Days festival for two days in July 2005. The festival was canceled after the city council objected.
- Gilbert is the birthplace of Bernie Kukar, a National Football League referee from 1984 to 2005.
- Treg Brown, American motion picture sound editor, was born in Gilbert in 1899.
