= Eveleth, Minnesota =

City in Minnesota, United States

Eveleth
- City
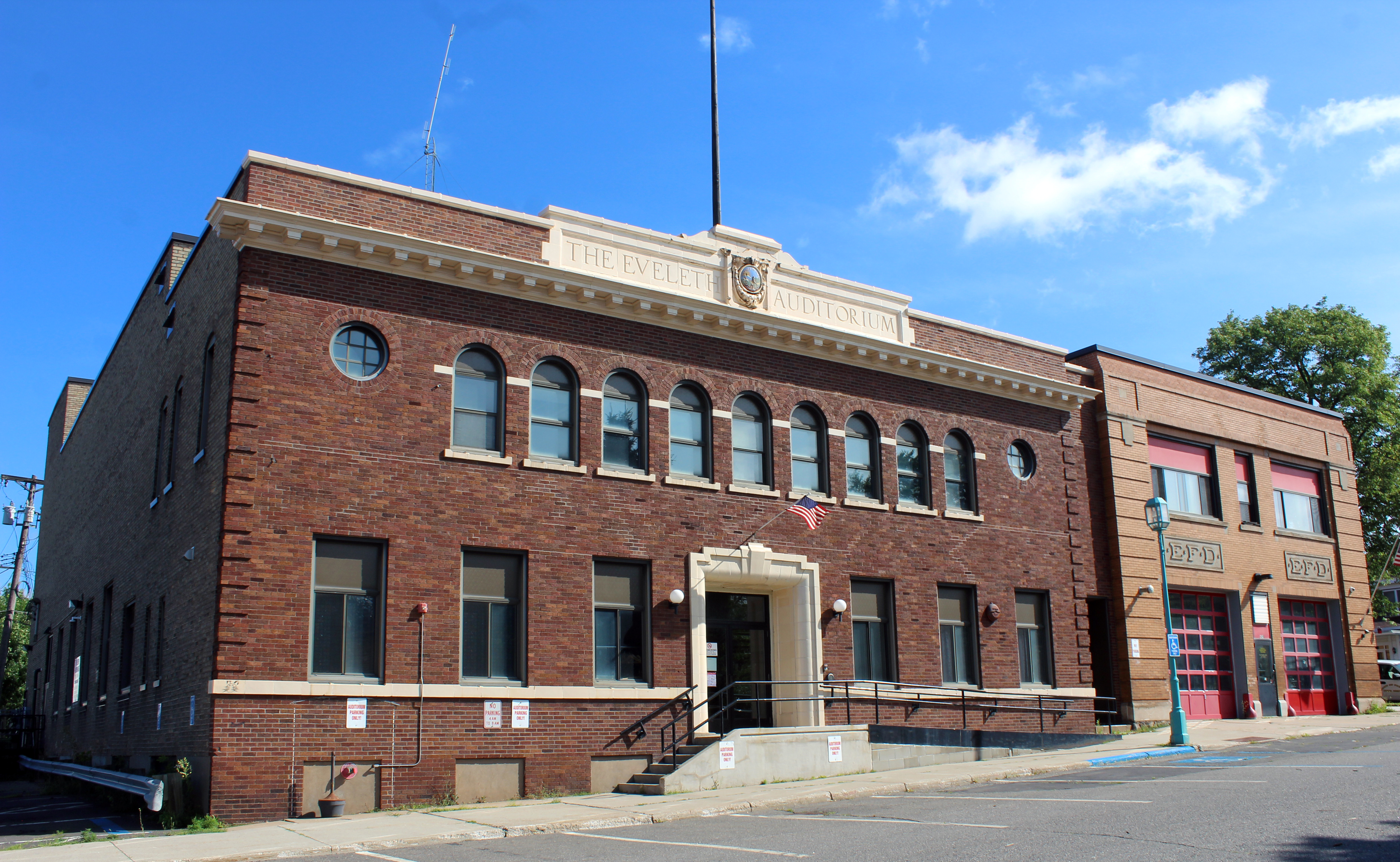
- Eveleth Auditorium and Fire Department
- Nickname: "The Capital of American Hockey"
- Location of the city of Eveleth within St. Louis County, Minnesota
- Coordinates: 47°27′46″N 92°32′25″W
- Country: United States
- State: Minnesota
- County: St. Louis
- Established: 1893

Government
  - Mayor: Adam Roen

Area
  - Total: 6.48 sq mi (16.78 km^{2})
  - Land: 6.31 sq mi (16.33 km^{2})
  - Water: 0.17 sq mi (0.45 km^{2})
- Elevation: 1,591 ft (485 m)

Population (2020)
  - Total: 3,493
  - Density: 554.1/sq mi (213.94/km^{2})
- Time zone: UTC−6 (Central (CST))
  - Summer (DST): UTC−5 (CDT)
- ZIP codes: 55734
- Area code: 218
- FIPS code: 27-19934
- GNIS feature ID: 0661233
- Website: City of Eveleth

Eveleth is a city in St. Louis County, Minnesota, United States. The population was 3,493 at the 2020 census. Eveleth is part of the Quad Cities, with Virginia, Gilbert, and Mountain Iron. U.S. Highway 53 and State Highway 37 (MN 37) are two of the main routes that run through the city.

Eveleth was the site of the conflict that resulted in the court case Jenson v. Eveleth Taconite Co., and is the site of the United States Hockey Hall of Fame.

== History ==
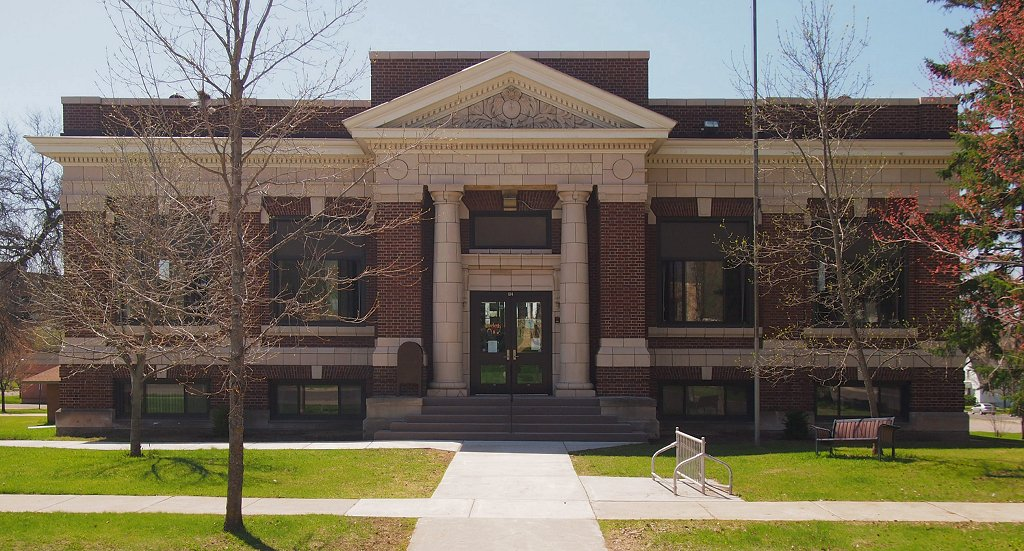
Eveleth Carnegie Library

The Village of Eveleth was platted on April 22, 1893, originally about 1 mile (1.6 km) southwest of the present location, on land then included in the Adams-Spruce Mine (Douglas Avenue between Jones and Monroe Streets). The community was named after Erwin Eveleth, a prominent employee of a timber company in the area. In 1895, iron ore was discovered beneath the village site and a post office was established. Eveleth first established its post office on February 9, 1895, with P. Ellard Dowling as commander-in-chief. Eveleth also had its first paper, The Eveleth Star, the same year. In 1900, the village moved to its present location. It was incorporated as a city in 1902. When the city expanded, it annexed portions of Fayal Township, including the former unincorporated communities of Alice Mine Station (in the Alice Location south of downtown) and Fayal. With further expansion, Eveleth annexed the unincorporated community of Genoa to its east.

Throughout the 20th century, Eveleth's economy remained centered on iron ore mining, which shaped the city's development and population trends. During World War II, mining activity increased to meet wartime demand for iron ore, supporting employment and growth. In the postwar decades, the industry declined, causing economic challenges and population decreases. The city adapted by focusing on diversification efforts and community services.

In 1988, Eveleth gained national attention with the filing of Jenson v. Eveleth Taconite Co., the first sexual harassment class-action lawsuit in the United States, which highlighted workplace discrimination issues at the local mines. This case marked a significant event in the city's modern history.

Toward the end of the 20th century and into the 21st, Eveleth became known for its strong hockey culture, hosting the United States Hockey Hall of Fame and notable high school teams. The Hockey Hall of Fame, established in Eveleth in 1973, honors a large number of U.S. hockey legends from the area, making Eveleth a birthplace of American hockey. In recent years, there have been discussions about moving the Hall of Fame to St. Paul as part of a hockey-themed redevelopment project near the Grand Casino Arena to attract more visitors. However, this proposal has generated opposition from local leaders and state lawmakers who want to preserve the museum's historic location on the Iron Range, highlighting its cultural and community significance.

== Geography ==
According to the United States Census Bureau, the city has an area of 6.45 square miles (16.71 km^{2}); 6.29 square miles (16.29 km^{2}) is land and 0.16 square miles (0.41 km^{2}) is water.

Eveleth is in the Duluth MN-WI Metropolitan Statistical Area.

=== Climate ===
The Köppen Climate Classification subtype for this climate is "Dfb". (Warm Summer Continental Climate). Summers are warm and winters are long and cold. Most of the precipitation happens in the warmer months but winters still see snowfall.

Climate data for Eveleth, Minnesota, 1991–2020 normals, extremes 1986–present
Month	Jan	Feb	Mar	Apr	May	Jun	Jul	Aug	Sep	Oct	Nov	Dec	Year
Record high °F (°C)	46 (8)	55 (13)	76 (24)	85 (29)	89 (32)	95 (35)	98 (37)	93 (34)	90 (32)	86 (30)	72 (22)	49 (9)	98 (37)
Mean maximum °F (°C)	36.5 (2.5)	42.7 (5.9)	57.3 (14.1)	71.0 (21.7)	82.4 (28.0)	86.0 (30.0)	88.2 (31.2)	86.4 (30.2)	82.6 (28.1)	73.2 (22.9)	53.8 (12.1)	39.5 (4.2)	89.9 (32.2)
Mean daily maximum °F (°C)	16.5 (−8.6)	22.1 (−5.5)	35.3 (1.8)	49.0 (9.4)	63.1 (17.3)	72.3 (22.4)	77.2 (25.1)	75.5 (24.2)	66.0 (18.9)	50.9 (10.5)	34.5 (1.4)	21.8 (−5.7)	48.7 (9.3)
Daily mean °F (°C)	7.5 (−13.6)	11.9 (−11.2)	24.8 (−4.0)	38.3 (3.5)	51.9 (11.1)	61.7 (16.5)	66.4 (19.1)	64.6 (18.1)	55.7 (13.2)	42.2 (5.7)	27.2 (−2.7)	14.1 (−9.9)	38.9 (3.8)
Mean daily minimum °F (°C)	−1.5 (−18.6)	1.7 (−16.8)	14.3 (−9.8)	27.6 (−2.4)	40.7 (4.8)	51.1 (10.6)	55.6 (13.1)	53.8 (12.1)	45.3 (7.4)	33.4 (0.8)	19.9 (−6.7)	6.4 (−14.2)	29.0 (−1.6)
Mean minimum °F (°C)	−23.0 (−30.6)	−19.0 (−28.3)	−8.4 (−22.4)	13.6 (−10.2)	27.9 (−2.3)	39.0 (3.9)	45.5 (7.5)	44.0 (6.7)	31.9 (−0.1)	22.0 (−5.6)	1.9 (−16.7)	−16.1 (−26.7)	−25.6 (−32.0)
Record low °F (°C)	−35 (−37)	−44 (−42)	−32 (−36)	−4 (−20)	17 (−8)	31 (−1)	36 (2)	36 (2)	27 (−3)	8 (−13)	−13 (−25)	−29 (−34)	−44 (−42)
Average precipitation inches (mm)	0.77 (20)	0.70 (18)	1.16 (29)	1.95 (50)	3.00 (76)	4.25 (108)	3.92 (100)	3.49 (89)	3.44 (87)	2.55 (65)	1.35 (34)	1.00 (25)	27.58 (701)
Average snowfall inches (cm)	11.8 (30)	9.7 (25)	5.6 (14)	5.7 (14)	0.1 (0.25)	0.0 (0.0)	0.0 (0.0)	0.0 (0.0)	0.0 (0.0)	1.0 (2.5)	7.4 (19)	13.2 (34)	54.5 (138.75)
Average extreme snow depth inches (cm)	15.5 (39)	18.2 (46)	12.8 (33)	5.1 (13)	0.1 (0.25)	0.0 (0.0)	0.0 (0.0)	0.0 (0.0)	0.0 (0.0)	0.8 (2.0)	6.0 (15)	9.4 (24)	21.6 (55)
Average precipitation days (≥ 0.01 in)	9.8	7.5	6.7	7.8	11.9	13.5	11.4	10.2	11.9	11.2	10.2	11.5	123.6
Average snowy days (≥ 0.1 in)	7.4	5.8	3.5	1.6	0.1	0.0	0.0	0.0	0.0	0.8	3.5	8.4	31.1
Source 1: NOAA
Source 2: National Weather Service

== Demographics ==
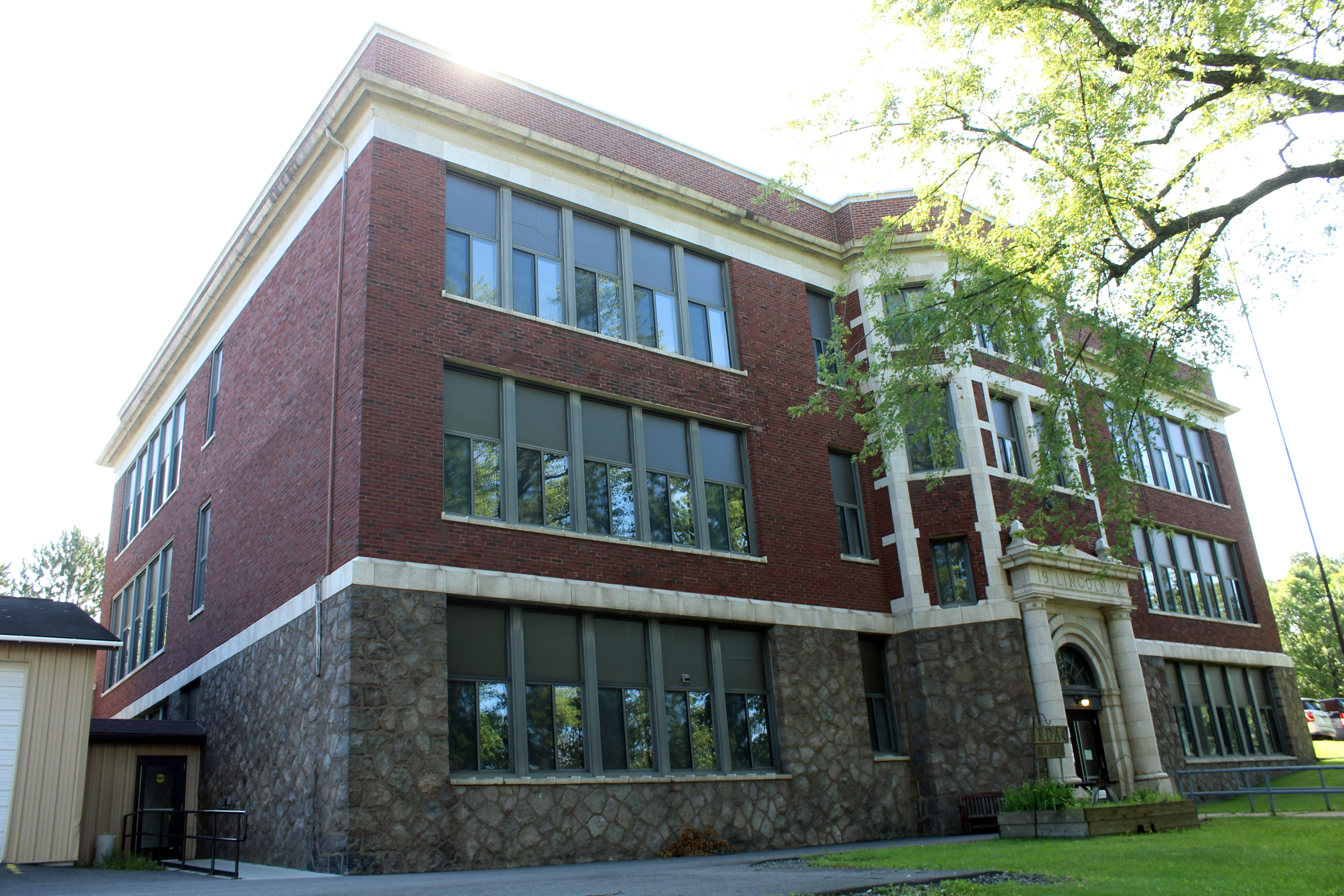
Former Lincoln School, now the East Range Developmental Achievement Center

Historical population
Census	Pop.	Note	%±
1900	2,752		—
1910	7,036		155.7%
1920	7,205		2.4%
1930	7,484		3.9%
1940	6,887		−8.0%
1950	5,872		−14.7%
1960	5,721		−2.6%
1970	4,721		−17.5%
1980	5,042		6.8%
1990	4,064		−19.4%
2000	3,865		−4.9%
2010	3,718		−3.8%
2020	3,493		−6.1%
U.S. Decennial Census

=== 2020 census ===
As of the 2020 census, Eveleth had a population of 3,493. The median age was 42.4 years. 20.5% of residents were under the age of 18 and 20.2% of residents were 65 years of age or older. For every 100 females there were 95.8 males, and for every 100 females age 18 and over there were 92.7 males age 18 and over.

80.9% of residents lived in urban areas, while 19.1% lived in rural areas.

There were 1,618 households in Eveleth, of which 24.2% had children under the age of 18 living in them. Of all households, 32.1% were married-couple households, 25.5% were households with a male householder and no spouse or partner present, and 32.6% were households with a female householder and no spouse or partner present. About 41.5% of all households were made up of individuals and 15.4% had someone living alone who was 65 years of age or older.

There were 1,872 housing units, of which 13.6% were vacant. The homeowner vacancy rate was 2.5% and the rental vacancy rate was 14.2%.

Non-Hispanic White residents were 3,149 (90.2%) of the population.

Racial composition as of the 2020 census
Race	Number	Percent
White	3,174	90.9%
Black or African American	45	1.3%
American Indian and Alaska Native	58	1.7%
Asian	9	0.3%
Native Hawaiian and Other Pacific Islander	0	0.0%
Some other race	20	0.6%
Two or more races	187	5.4%
Hispanic or Latino (of any race)	53	1.5%

=== 2010 census ===
As of the census of 2010, there were 3,718 people, 1,682 households, and 921 families living in the city. The population density was 591.1 inhabitants per square mile (228.2/km^{2}). There were 1,942 housing units at an average density of 308.7 per square mile (119.2/km^{2}). The racial makeup of the city was 95.0% White, 0.5% African American, 1.8% Native American, 0.3% Asian, 0.1% from other races, and 2.2% from two or more races. Hispanic or Latino of any race were 0.9% of the population.

There were 1,682 households, of which 28.5% had children under the age of 18 living with them, 36.0% were married couples living together, 13.1% had a female householder with no husband present, 5.6% had a male householder with no wife present, and 45.2% were non-families. 38.9% of all households were made up of individuals, and 13.2% had someone living alone who was 65 years of age or older. The average household size was 2.14 and the average family size was 2.83.

The median age in the city was 39.6 years. 22.8% of residents were under the age of 18; 8.2% were between the ages of 18 and 24; 25.5% were from 25 to 44; 27.3% were from 45 to 64; and 16.1% were 65 years of age or older. The gender makeup of the city was 48.7% male and 51.3% female.

=== 2000 census ===
As of the 2000 census, there were 3,865 people, 1,717 households, and 971 families living in the city. The population density was 611.0 inhabitants per square mile (235.9/km^{2}). There were 1,965 housing units at an average density of 310.6 per square mile (119.9/km^{2}). The racial makeup of the city was 96.48% White, 0.16% African American, 1.73% Native American, 0.41% Asian, 0.08% from other races, and 1.14% from two or more races. Hispanic or Latino of any race were 0.23% of the population. 16.6% were of Finnish, 14.1% German, 14.1% Norwegian, 8.6% Italian, 7.7% Slovene and 6.1% Swedish ancestry.

There were 1,717 households, out of which 26.8% had children under the age of 18 living with them, 40.4% were married couples living together, 11.8% had a female householder with no husband present, and 43.4% were non-families. 38.1% of all households were made up of individuals, and 16.2% had someone living alone who was 65 years of age or older. The average household size was 2.14 and the average family size was 2.80.

In the city, the population was spread out, with 21.6% under the age of 18, 8.6% from 18 to 24, 26.5% from 25 to 44, 22.2% from 45 to 64, and 21.1% who were 65 years of age or older. The median age was 41 years. For every 100 females, there were 89.2 males. For every 100 females age 18 and over, there were 84.0 males.

The median income for a household in the city was $27,736, and the median income for a family was $37,069. Males had a median income of $32,723 versus $21,658 for females. The per capita income for the city was $16,635. About 10.6% of families and 15.4% of the population were below the poverty line, including 20.3% of those under age 18 and 14.2% of those age 65 or over.

== Economy ==
Mining

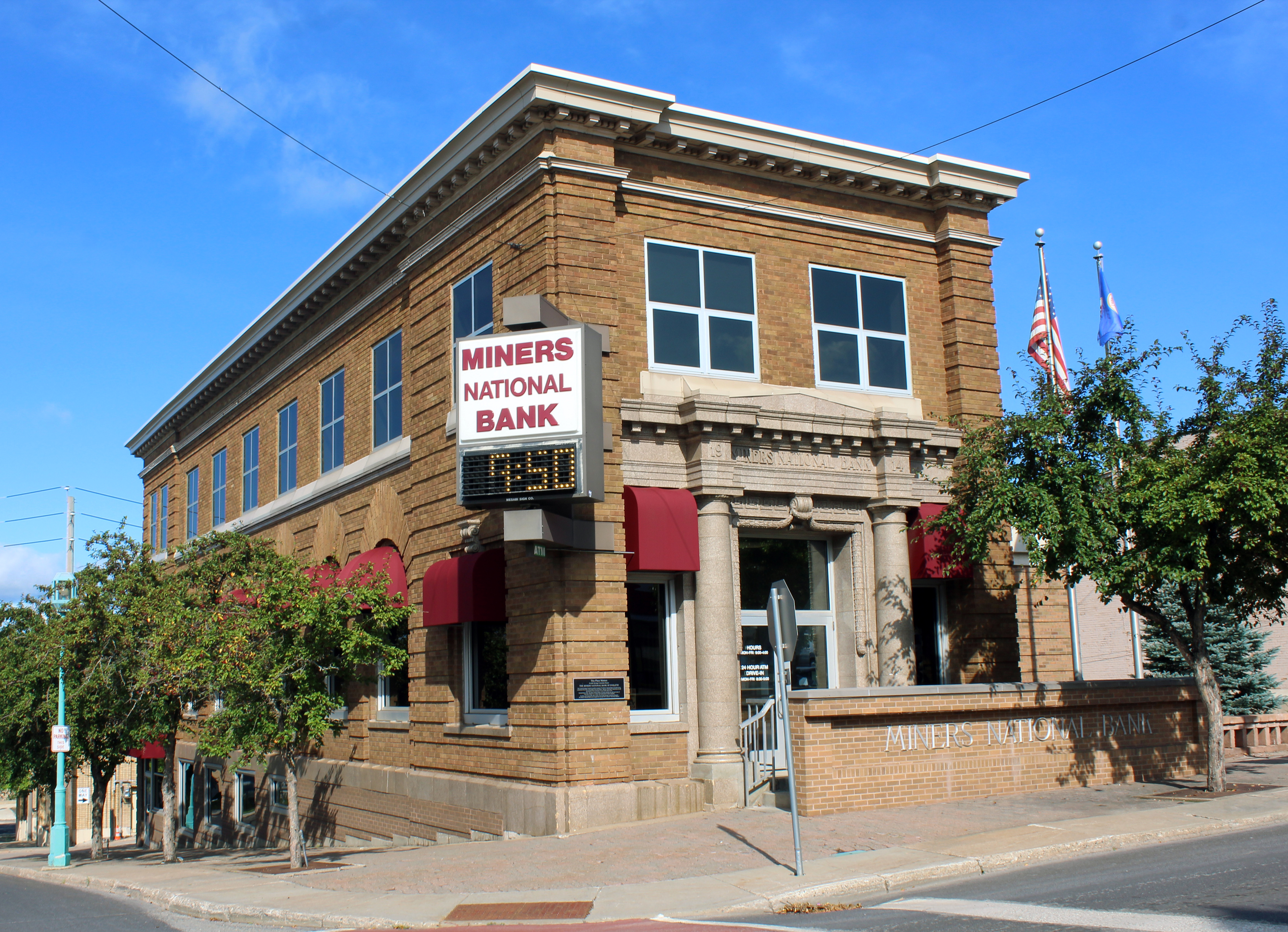
Miners National Bank building

Eveleth is on the Mesabi Range, one of sub-regions of Minnesota's Iron Range. The town's economy has always been tied to the iron ore mining and processing. This activity peaked during World War II and declined through the second half of the 20th century. A demand for iron ore occurred between 2005 and 2007, and local economies experienced a mild improvement due to improved mining productivity, which allowed demand to be met with only a modest increase in staffing.

Within Eveleth's city limits is Thunderbird Mine, where crude iron ore is processed into 5.5 million tons of iron ore taconite pellets per year. The ore is magnetite-bearing iron formation of the Paleoproterozoic Biwabik Iron Formation, and is crushed at the mine site and shipped by railroad to the Fairlane Plant in Forbes, Minnesota, for concentrating and pelletizing.

Tourism

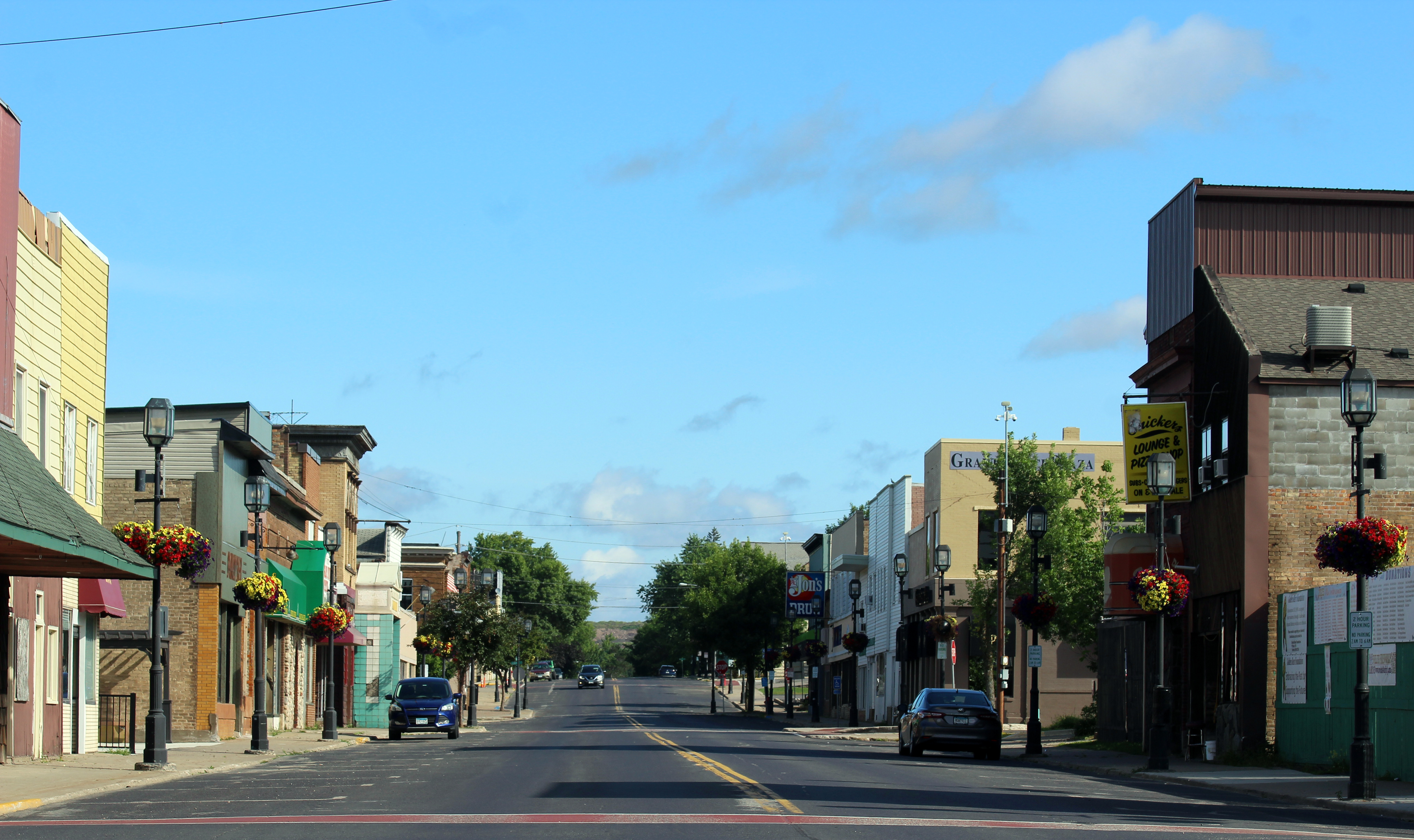
Grant Avenue looking north

The tourism economy of Minnesota's Iron Range contributes to economic diversification beyond its mining roots. Outdoor recreation and heritage tourism form the core of this sector. Facilities such as Giants Ridge Golf and Ski Resort generate approximately $55 million annually and support over 300 tourism-related jobs. The region attracts visitors with historical sites, museums, and natural landscapes that offer hiking, skiing, fishing, and cultural experiences. State and regional initiatives promote tourism through marketing campaigns and visitor programs, including the “Wander the Range” map, which guides exploration of local attractions. Tourism supports local businesses and provides economic stability in the area.

== Arts and culture ==
=== In popular culture ===
Feature films shot in Eveleth

Wildrose (1984) The independent drama follows June Lorich, a recently divorced woman who takes a job as a heavy machinery operator in an all-male iron mine on Minnesota's Mesabi Range. Wildrose was shot on location in Eveleth and surrounding Iron Range areas to capture the authentic mining environment and to tell the story rooted in the region's real social and industrial landscape.

North Country (2005) A drama based on the landmark Jenson v. Eveleth Taconite Co. sexual harassment case. It tells the story of Josey Aimes, who returns to northern Minnesota to work in an iron mine where she and other women face constant harassment and discrimination. Filmed largely in the northern Minnesota towns of Eveleth, Virginia, Chisholm, and Hibbing; Minneapolis; as well as Silver City and Santa Fe in New Mexico.

=== Hockey ===
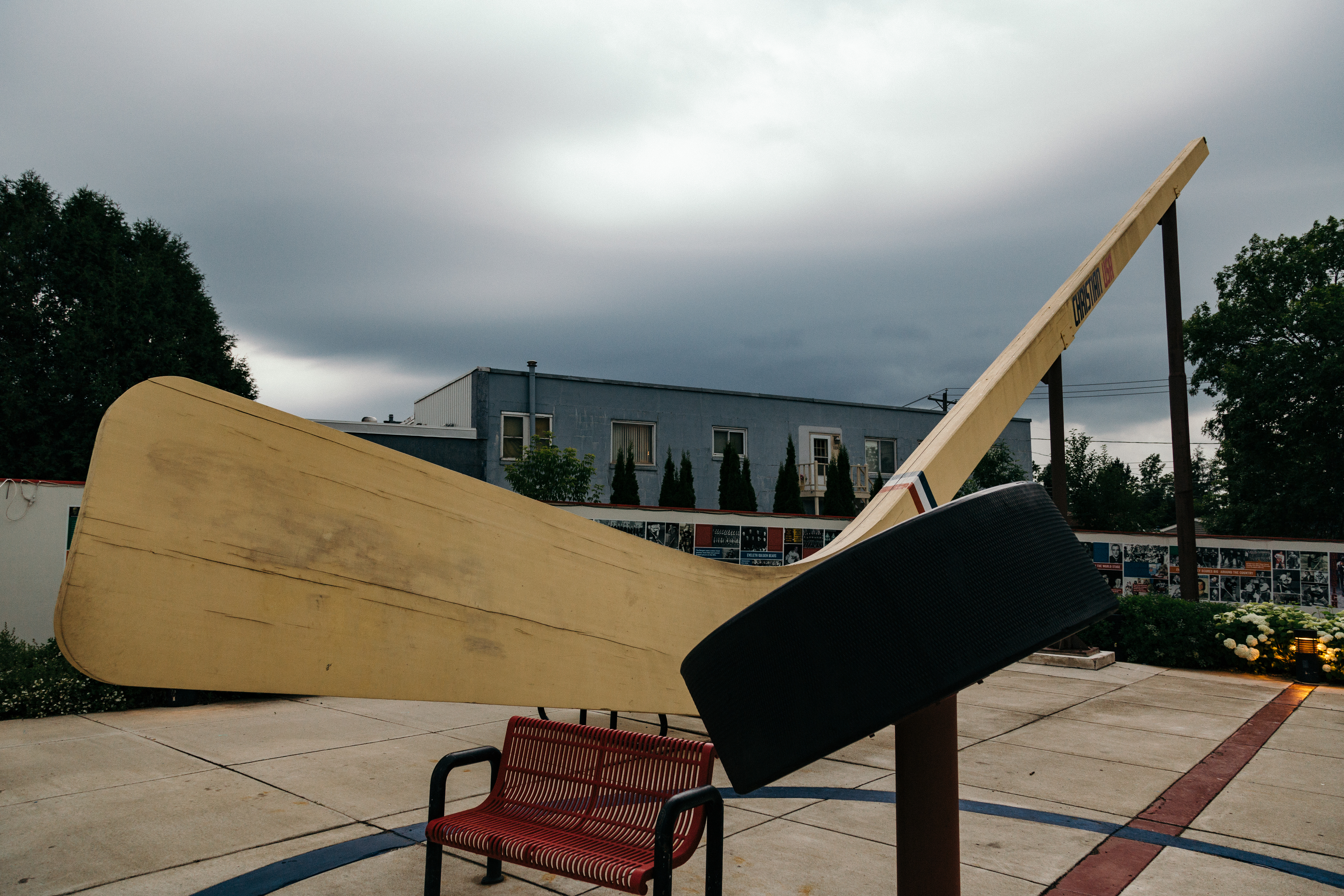
World's largest authentic hockey stick in Eveleth

The United States Hockey Hall of Fame (not to be confused with the Hockey Hall of Fame, in Toronto) is in Eveleth. The city has long been noted as a powerhouse of hockey talent. It has won several state championships, most recently in 1998. During the 1950s the Eveleth Golden Bears dominated high school hockey in Minnesota, garnering a number of state records, including most consecutive state championships (4: 1948–51), most consecutive championship games (5: 1948–52) and most consecutive tournament appearances (12: 1945–56), despite the district's tiny population.

Eveleth has the "world's largest authentic hockey stick", standing at 107 feet and weighing 3 tons. A few blocks away from the stick is the Eveleth Hippodrome, Minnesota's oldest hockey arena still in use. The Rock Ridge Wolverines Boys & Girls hockey teams play there as one out of two of their home rinks, the other being the Iron Trail Motors Event Center in Virginia.

== Notable people ==
- George Abramson, NFL player
- Fred Agnich, member of the Texas House of Representatives
- Rudy Ahlin, played one game in the NHL
- Nick Begich, U.S. representative
- Myron H. Bright, United States Court judge
- Frank Brimsek, NHL goalie
- John Patrick Boyle, Minnesota state senator and lawyer
- Steve Cannon, WCCO radio personality
- Arthur Cirilli, member of Wisconsin Senate
- Roy R. Coombe, Minnesota state legislator
- Andre Gambucci, hockey player who won a silver medal at the 1952 Winter Olympics
- Gus Hendrickson, professional ice hockey player and coach
- Willard Ikola, hockey player who won a silver medal at the 1956 Winter Olympics
- Bill Kangas, longtime men's hockey coach at Williams
- Elmer A. Lampe, college football player and coach
- Pete LoPresti, NHL goalie, son of Sam LoPresti
- Sam LoPresti, NHL goalie
- John Mariucci, NHL hockey player and coach
- John Mayasich, hockey player, 1960 Winter Olympic gold medalist
- John Matchefts, hockey player who won a silver medal at the 1956 Winter Olympics
- William R. Ojala, Minnesota state representative
- Doug Palazzari, professional hockey player
- Joe Papike, played 20 games in the NHL
- Mark Pavelich, winner of the 1980 USA hockey gold medal
- Matt Perushek, lawyer and Junior Olympics gold and bronze medal-winning curler
- Paul Schaefer, played five games in the NHL
- Kay Nolte Smith, writer
- Tony Storti, head coach of the Montana State Bobcats football team
- Al Suomi, professional hockey player
- Verner E. Suomi, educator, inventor, scientist, and "father of satellite meteorology"
- James B. Tapp, World War II flying ace
- Tom Yurkovich, hockey player who competed at the 1964 Winter Olympics
- Peter Michael Muhich, Roman Catholic Bishop of the Diocese of Rapid City
