= Roy R. Coombe =

American businessman and politician

Roy R. Coombe Sr. (April 11, 1924 – August 10, 2016) was an American businessman and politician.

Coombe was born in Eveleth, St. Louis County, Minnesota, and graduated from Eveleth High School. He served in the United States Navy during World War II. Coombe went to the Dunwoody Industrial Institute and to Eveleth Junior College. He worked for the newspaper and printing businesses and was a newspaper editor. Coombe served in the Minnesota House of Representatives in 1969 and 1970. He died in Eveleth, Minnesota.
