= Mountain Iron, Minnesota =

City in Minnesota, United States

Mountain Iron
- City
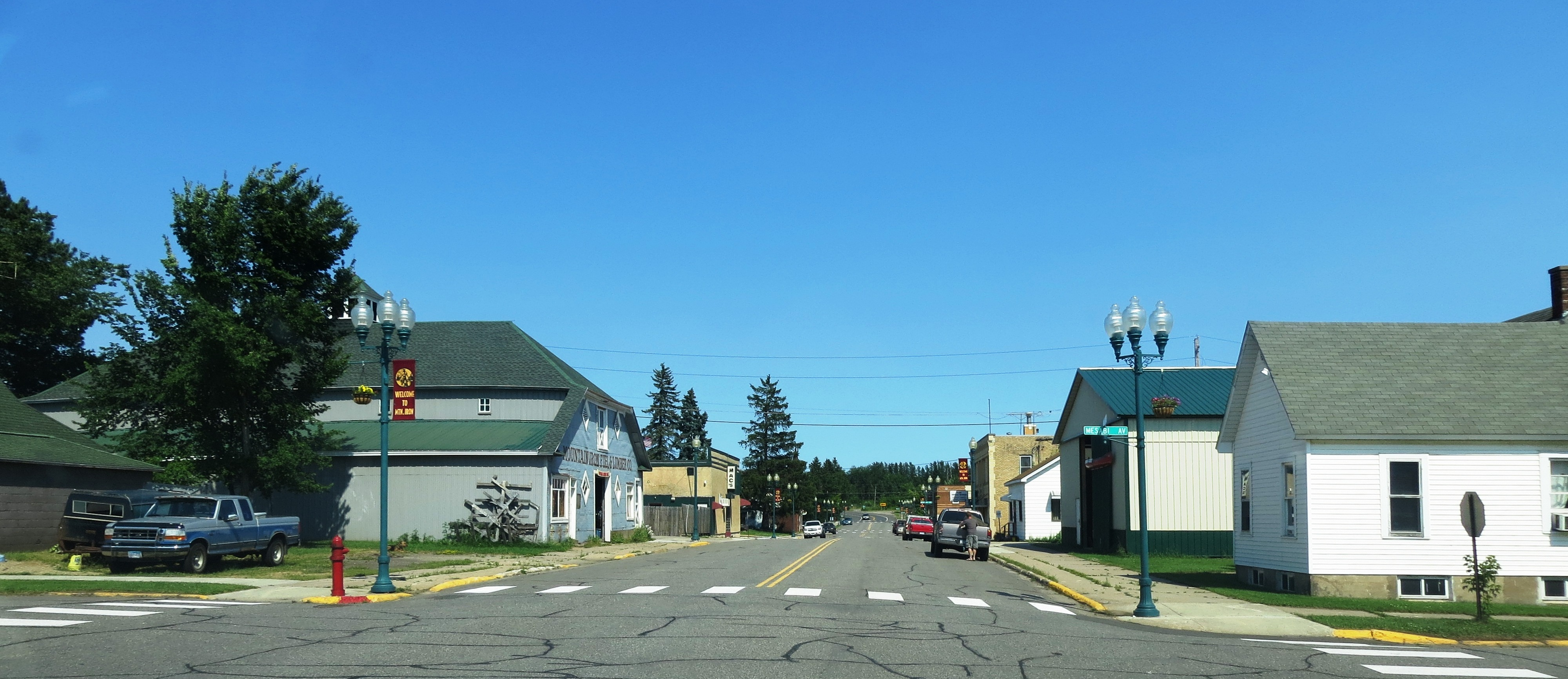
- This city is founded on the taconite iron ore deposits discovered by Leonidas Merritt in the 1880s.
- Motto: Taconite Capital of the World
- Location of the city of Mountain Iron within Saint Louis County, Minnesota
- Coordinates: 47°31′57″N 92°37′25″W
- Country: United States
- State: Minnesota
- County: Saint Louis
- Founded: 1892
- Incorporated (village): November 28, 1892
- Incorporated (city): June 20, 1913

Government
  - Mayor: Peggy Anderson

Area
  - Total: 70.89 sq mi (183.61 km^{2})
  - Land: 68.11 sq mi (176.40 km^{2})
  - Water: 2.78 sq mi (7.21 km^{2})
- Elevation: 1,480 ft (451 m)

Population (2020)
  - Total: 2,878
  - Estimate (2022): 2,860
  - Density: 42.3/sq mi (16.32/km^{2})
- Time zone: UTC−6 (Central (CST))
  - Summer (DST): UTC−5 (CDT)
- ZIP Codes: 55768 and 55792
- Area code: 218
- FIPS code: 27-44548
- GNIS feature ID: 0661972
- Sales tax: 7.375%
- Website: mtniron.com

Mountain Iron is a city in Saint Louis County, Minnesota, United States, in the heart of the Mesabi Range. The population was 2,878 at the 2020 census.

U.S. Highway 169 serves as a main route in Mountain Iron.

The city's motto is "Taconite Capital of the World". The local mine, Minntac, is owned by the United States Steel Corporation (U.S. Steel).

Mountain Iron is part of the Quad Cities, with Virginia, Eveleth, and Gilbert.

== History ==
Mountain Iron was founded in 1892 as a mining village in the former Nichols Township. It was named after the nearby Mountain Iron Mine.

Mountain Iron was incorporated as a city in 1972.

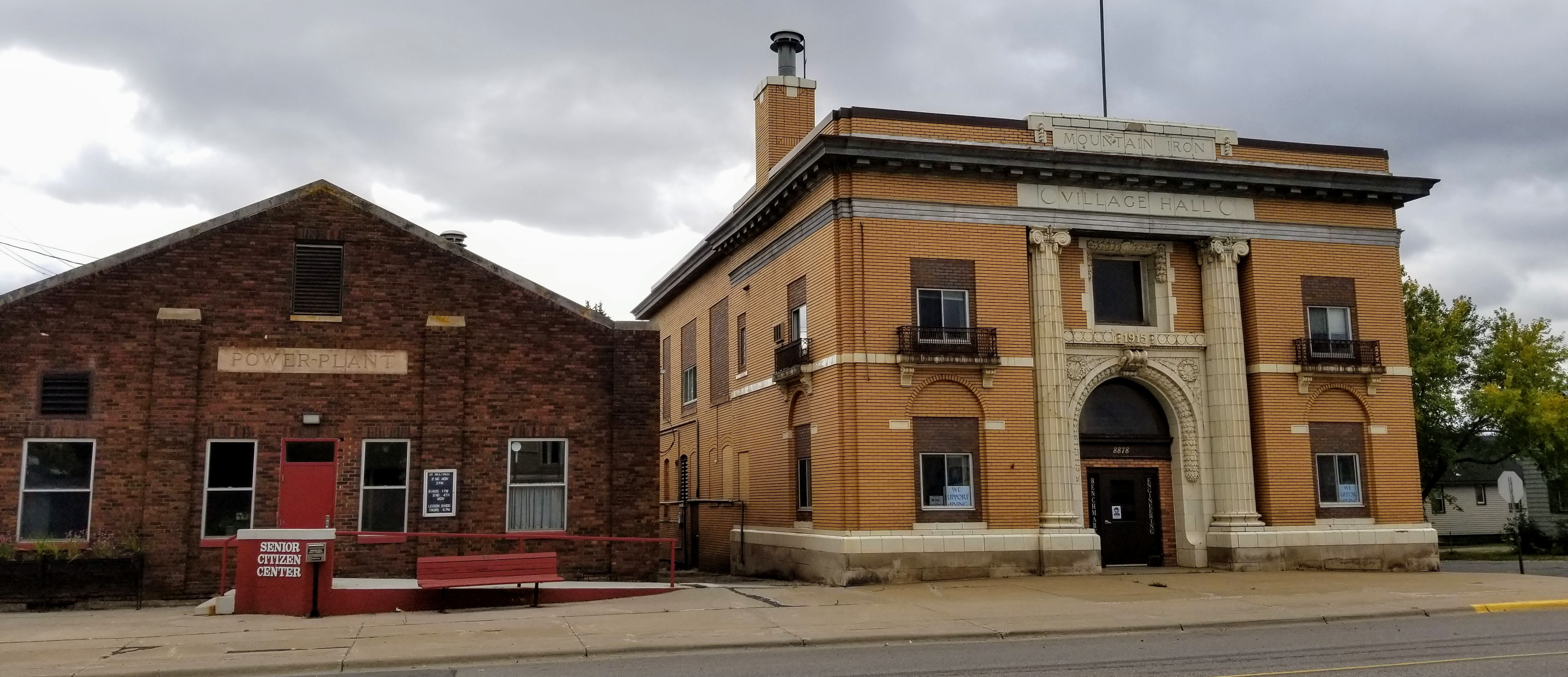
Mountain Iron power plant building and village hall building (2020)

== Geography ==
According to the United States Census Bureau, the city has an area of 71.31 square miles (184.69 km^{2}); 68.52 square miles (177.47 km^{2}) is land and 2.79 square miles (7.23 km^{2}) is water.

== Demographics ==
Historical population
Census	Pop.	Note	%±
1900	470		—
1910	1,343		185.7%
1920	1,546		15.1%
1930	1,349		−12.7%
1940	1,492		10.6%
1950	1,377		−7.7%
1960	1,808		31.3%
1970	1,698		−6.1%
1980	4,134		143.5%
1990	3,362		−18.7%
2000	2,999		−10.8%
2010	2,869		−4.3%
2020	2,878		0.3%
2022 (est.)	2,860		−0.6%
U.S. Decennial Census; 2020 Census

=== 2020 census ===
As of the 2020 census, Mountain Iron had a population of 2,878. The median age was 47.6 years. 21.0% of residents were under the age of 18 and 26.6% of residents were 65 years of age or older. For every 100 females there were 98.1 males, and for every 100 females age 18 and over there were 94.0 males age 18 and over.

65.8% of residents lived in urban areas, while 34.2% lived in rural areas.

There were 1,322 households in Mountain Iron, of which 22.2% had children under the age of 18 living in them. Of all households, 44.4% were married-couple households, 19.8% were households with a male householder and no spouse or partner present, and 28.2% were households with a female householder and no spouse or partner present. About 36.1% of all households were made up of individuals and 14.8% had someone living alone who was 65 years of age or older.

There were 1,425 housing units, of which 7.2% were vacant. The homeowner vacancy rate was 1.2% and the rental vacancy rate was 6.4%.

Racial composition as of the 2020 census
Race	Number	Percent
White	2,674	92.9%
Black or African American	17	0.6%
American Indian and Alaska Native	37	1.3%
Asian	14	0.5%
Native Hawaiian and Other Pacific Islander	0	0.0%
Some other race	4	0.1%
Two or more races	132	4.6%
Hispanic or Latino (of any race)	14	0.5%

=== 2010 census ===
As of the census of 2010, there were 2,869 people, 1,336 households, and 796 families living in the city. The population density was 41.9 inhabitants per square mile (16.2/km^{2}). There were 1,442 housing units at an average density of 21.0 per square mile (8.1/km^{2}). The racial makeup of the city was 96.8% White, 0.3% African American, 0.7% Native American, 0.2% Asian, and 2.0% from two or more races. Hispanic or Latino of any race were 0.6% of the population.

There were 1,336 households, of which 24.8% had children under the age of 18 living with them, 44.7% were married couples living together, 10.3% had a female householder with no husband present, 4.6% had a male householder with no wife present, and 40.4% were non-families. 35.9% of all households were made up of individuals, and 14.4% had someone living alone who was 65 years of age or older. The average household size was 2.14 and the average family size was 2.72.

The median age in the city was 45.4 years. 20.7% of residents were under the age of 18; 7.2% were between the ages of 18 and 24; 21.8% were from 25 to 44; 33% were from 45 to 64; and 17.4% were 65 years of age or older. The gender makeup of the city was 49.8% male and 50.2% female.

=== 2000 census ===
As of the census of 2000, there were 2,999 people, 1,326 households, and 847 families living in the city. The population density was 60.7 inhabitants per square mile (23.4/km^{2}). There were 1,409 housing units at an average density of 28.5 per square mile (11.0/km^{2}). The racial makeup of the city was 98.30% White, 0.77% Native American, 0.23% Asian, 0.13% from other races, and 0.57% from two or more races. Hispanic or Latino of any race were 0.40% of the population. 27.3% were of Finnish, 11.2% German, 9.8% Italian, 8.8% Norwegian, 6.1% Swedish and 5.1% Slovene ancestry.

There were 1,326 households, out of which 27.6% had children under the age of 18 living with them, 50.2% were married couples living together, 10.1% had a female householder with no husband present, and 36.1% were non-families. 31.2% of all households were made up of individuals, and 13.4% had someone living alone who was 65 years of age or older. The average household size was 2.26 and the average family size was 2.83.

In the city, the population was spread out, with 22.9% under the age of 18, 9.4% from 18 to 24, 24.3% from 25 to 44, 27.9% from 45 to 64, and 15.5% who were 65 years of age or older. The median age was 41 years. For every 100 females, there were 94.0 males. For every 100 females age 18 and over, there were 90.4 males.

The median income for a household in the city was $35,163, and the median income for a family was $52,695. Males had a median income of $41,806 versus $22,837 for females. The per capita income for the city was $18,761. About 7.8% of families and 10.7% of the population were below the poverty line, including 17.0% of those under age 18 and 5.4% of those age 65 or over.
