= John Doyle (Canadian artist) =

Canadian artist

John Doyle (born 1950 in Toronto, Ontario) is a prominent Canadian painter. A 1974 graduate of Fine Arts at York University, he has had solo and group shows in galleries across Canada. Doyle has traveled extensively throughout Canada, capturing the Canadian landscape, from one coast to the other, in paint. He works predominantly in acrylic on canvas, applying paint in an expressive style. Moving, over the course of his career, from subtle to vibrant in his use of colour, his most recent work is notable for its audacious use of colour and bold brush strokes.

== Exhibitions ==
=== Solo exhibitions, public museums ===
1974, Winters Art Gallery, York University, Toronto, Ontario
1983, New Brunswick Museum, Saint John, New Brunswick

=== Solo exhibitions, commercial galleries ===
1981, Prince Arthur Galleries, Toronto, Ontario
1984, Quan Shieder Gallery, Toronto, Ontario
1987, Quan Shieder Gallery, Toronto, Ontario
1989, Quan Shieder Gallery, Toronto, Ontario
1992, Quan Shieder Gallery, Toronto, Ontario
1998, Gallery One, Toronto, Ontario
1998, Dominion Gallery, Montreal, Quebec
2001, Gallery One, Toronto, Ontario
2002, Gallery One, Toronto, Ontario
2004, Gallery One, Toronto, Ontario

=== Group exhibitions ===
1981, Windsor Art Gallery, Windsor, Ontario
1981, Ring Gallery, Saint John, New Brunswick
1982, Quan Shieder Gallery, Toronto, Ontario
1983, Ring Gallery, Saint John, New Brunswick
1983, Quan Shieder Gallery, Toronto, Ontario
1986, Quan Shieder Gallery, Toronto, Ontario
1987, Quan Shieder Gallery, Toronto, Ontario
1990, Quan Shieder Gallery, Toronto, Ontario
1991, Dominion Gallery, Montreal, Quebec
1996, Gallery One, Toronto, Ontario
2000, Gallery One, Toronto, Ontario
2002, Gallery One, Toronto, Ontario
2004, Gallery One, Toronto, Ontario

== Collections ==
Canada Development Corporation, B.P. Canada Corporation, Pan Canadian Inc., Norcen Energy Resources, L.A.C. Minerals, Imperial Oil Limited, Walwyn Stogell, I.I.M. Inc., Caldwell Partners, Corrie Advertising, Bilt-Rite, Kornberry International, Cossette Communications, Kempdale Consultants, Canadian Imperial Bank of Commerce, Curraugh Resources, Iona Corporation, Lang Mitchner, Shoppers Drug Mart, Realstar, Fidelity Mutual, Taurus Capital Markets Brokers, Stanley Morin, Bennett Jones Verchere Law, Toronto Hydro, Provich Finance.

== Reviews ==
1983, July 21, "East Coast Awesome Through Artists Eyes", by Jo Anne Claus, The Evening Times Globe, Saint John, New Brunswick
1984, February 23, "A Happy Change In Landscape", by John Bentley Mays, The Globe and Mail, Toronto, Ontario
1998, November, "ARTseen" by Bernard Mendelman, The Montreal Suburban, Montreal, Quebec
