= John Doyle (British Army soldier) =

Irishman in the 19th-century British Army

- Born: 1828; Birr, County Offaly, Ireland
- Died: August 1892 (aged 63–64); England

John Doyle (abt. 1828 – August 1892) was an Irishman who served in the 8th King's Royal Irish Hussars (a light cavalry unit) as a Private soldier during the Crimean War and the Indian Rebellion of 1857.

== Life ==
Doyle was born at Birr, County Offaly, Ireland, about 1828 and died at Liverpool, England in August 1892.

Doyle enlisted in the British Cavalry at Newbridge, Ireland in 1850. His brother, Patrick, had signed up as an infantryman and died when his transport, HMS Birkenhead, struck a reef off Cape Agulhas, South Africa. He rode in the Charge of the Light Brigade at Balaklava and survived, lightly wounded but not captured.

== Achievements ==
Doyle fought at four major Crimean War battles: Alma, Balaklava, Inkerman, and Sebastopol. He was a member of the Balaclava Commemoration Society, made up of survivors of the Charge of the Light Brigade of 1854.

In Manchester in 1877 he published a memoir of his service titled A Descriptive Account of the Famous Charge of the Light Brigade at Balaclava.
