= Jack Doyle (rugby union) =

Irish rugby union player

- Full name: John Thomas Doyle
- Born: 29 May 1915 Rathdown, County Dublin, Ireland
- Died: 3 October 1998 (aged 83)

Rugby union career
- Position: Wing
International career
Years	Team	Apps	(Points)
1935	Ireland	1	(3)

John Thomas Doyle (29 May 1915 — 3 October 1998) was an Irish international rugby union player.

Born in Rathdown, County Dublin, Doyle played his rugby for Bray and was capped once for Ireland as a wing three-quarter against Wales at Belfast. He contributed a try in an Ireland win, but didn't get any further opportunities. Other than rugby, Doyle was also a sprinter and competed in equestrian events.

Doyle became a successful bloodstock agent. He most famously selected the long-shot 1963 Cheltenham Gold Cup-winning horse Mill House for Bill Gollings.

== See also ==
- List of Ireland national rugby union players
