= John Doyle (English footballer) =

English footballer

Personal information
- Full name: John Joseph Doyle
- Date of birth: 8 February 1960 (age 66)
- Place of birth: Oxford, England
- Position: Right back

John Joseph Doyle (born 8 February 1960) is an English former footballer who played as a right-back for Oxford City, Oxford United and Torquay United. He was born in Oxford in 1960 and made 80 appearances (66 in the league) for Oxford United between 1977 and 1982.
