= John Patrick Boyle =

American politician (1880–1968)

Member of the Minnesota Senate from the 49th district
- In office January 3, 1911 – January 4, 1915

Personal details
- Born: February 9, 1880 Glencoe, Minnesota, U.S.
- Died: March 3, 1968 (aged 88) Tucson, Arizona, U.S.
- Party: Republican
- Spouse: Hulda
- Children: 2
- Education: Valparaiso University; Indiana University Maurer School of Law
- Occupation: Politician, lawyer

John Patrick Boyle Sr. (February 9, 1880 – March 3, 1968) was an American lawyer and politician.

== Biography ==
Boyle was born in Glencoe, McLeod County, Minnesota on February 9, 1880. He went to parochial and public schools in St. Cloud, Minnesota and Melrose, Minnesota. Boyle went to Valparaiso University and then received his law degree from Indiana University Maurer School of Law. He lived in Eveleth, St. Louis County, Minnesota with his wife and family and practiced law. Boyle served as the Eveleth City Attorney and as the St. Louis County Assistant District Attorney. He also served in the Minnesota Senate from 1911 to 1914 and was a Republican. He moved to Douglas, Arizona in 1915 and then moved to Tucson, Arizona. Boyle died in Tucson, Arizona on March 3, 1968.
