= Lake Ore-be-gone =

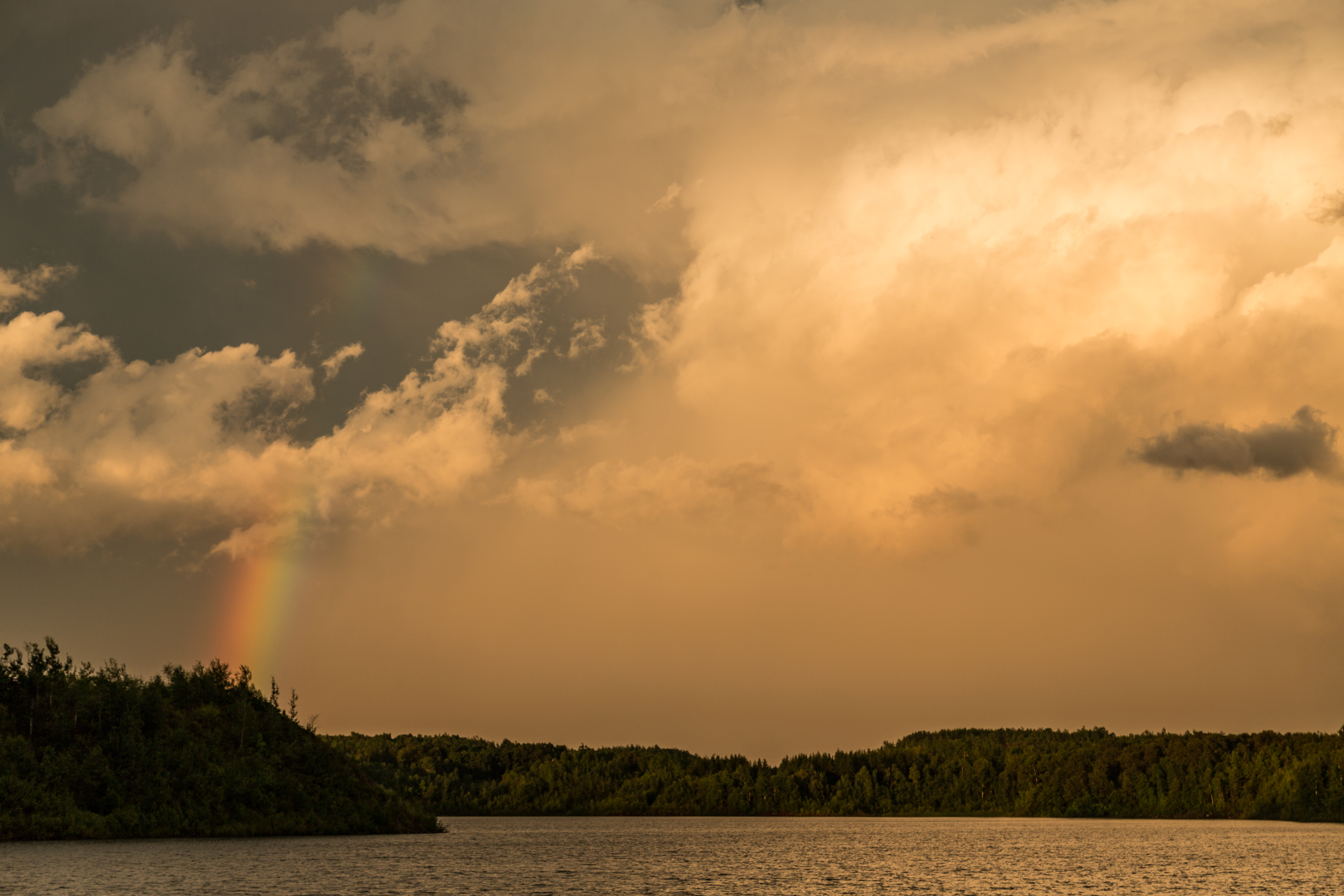
- A rainbow over Lake Ore-be-Gone

- Location within Minnesota Location within the United States
- Location: Gilbert, Minnesota
- Coordinates: 47°28′43″N 92°27′42″W
- Type: Artificial lake
- Basin countries: United States
- Surface area: 140 acres (57 ha)
- Max. depth: 132 m (433 ft)
- Surface elevation: 1,452 ft (443 m) above sea level

Lake Ore-be-gone is a 140-acre (57 ha) artificial lake, formed by the flooding of three open-pit iron ore mines, within the city limits of Gilbert, Minnesota, US.

Since the flooding of the mining pits, the area around the lake has been subject to land reclamation, and there now exist beaches and docks. As of June 2011, the beaches previously closed due to low water have been excavated and a new swimming area and boat landing are in the works.

There are many sunken attractions for scuba divers to explore near the boat landings and the beach. A map can be found outside the changing house, and the sites are typically marked with white buoys from late spring to October.

The lake's name is a pun on the well-known fictional town of Lake Wobegon, purportedly located in Minnesota.
