= Chestnut Canoe Company =

Canadian producers of wood-and-canvas canoes

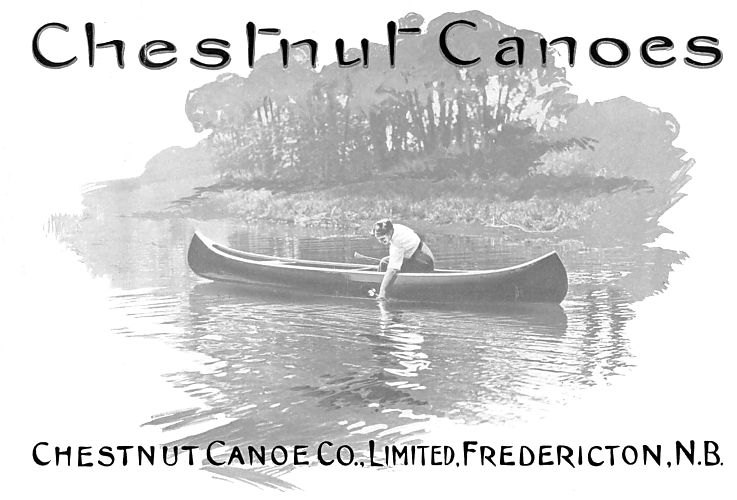

Chestnut Canoe Company was established in Fredericton in the Canadian province of New Brunswick at the end of the 19th century and became one of the pre-eminent producers of wood-and-canvas canoes. The company closed in 1979.

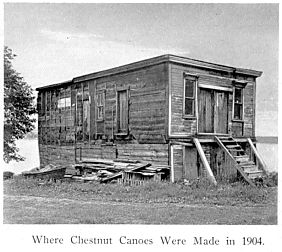

== History ==
By the end of the nineteenth century, wealthy American "sports" had discovered the New Brunswick wilderness and arrived via the Saint John River in the Maine-built wood-canvas canoes of B.N. Morris, E.M. White, and E.H. Gerrish. Brothers William and Henry Chestnut, inheritors of their father's hardware business, became aware of the interest in canvas-covered canoes but knew importing them from the United States would substantially increase price due to import duties. The Chestnut brothers hired boatbuilder Jack J. Moore to build a replica of a Morris canoe. Early Chestnut canoes clearly show the influence of the Morris.

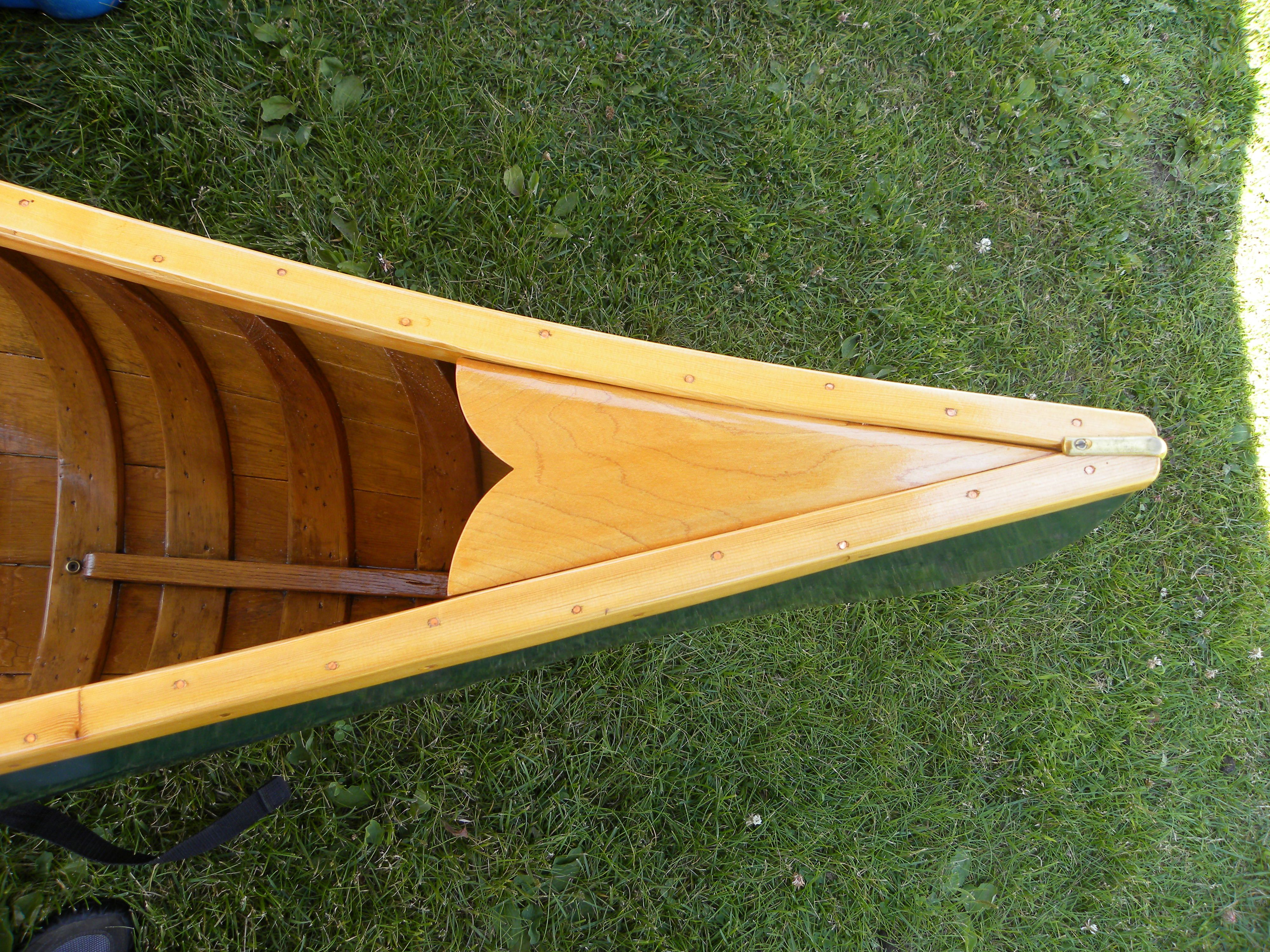
1909 Chestnut, displaying deck similar to that of a B.N. Morris

When Chestnut's business increased to the degree that additional experienced builders were required, William Chestnut ventured to Maine and aggressively recruited men from the Old Town factory. Old Town responded by filing a lawsuit and threatened to set up a factory of their own in Canada.

We hereby warn anyone in Canada against using our construction!

In 1905, Chestnut was granted a patent for the process of building the wood-canvas canoe, despite the fact that the process had been in use for more than thirty years. In 1909, they filed suit against the Peterborough Canoe Company for patent infringement, but the suit was dismissed. Eventually, the Chestnut Canoe Company and Peterborough Canoe Company merged under the holding company Canadian Watercraft Limited. Canadian Canoe Company joined them in 1927. All three companies maintained separate identities after the merger, while marketing nearly identical lines of canvas canoes. It is often said that Chestnut was responsible for the canvas canoe production for all three companies.

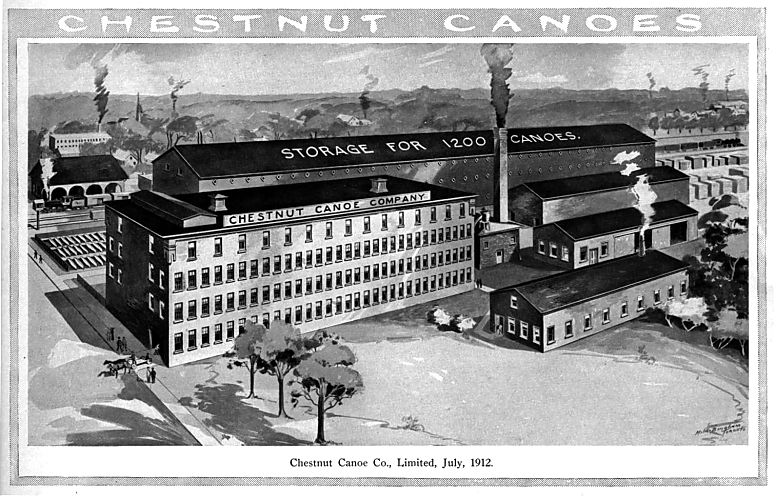

The Chestnut Company left Fredericton, moving to a new factory in Oromocto, New Brunswick in 1974. The factory closed for good in 1978, shipping their last canoe in December of that year. The company had intended to produce 300 Special Edition Indian Maiden canoes, but only a prototype and two other canoes were made. On September 12, 1978, the Chestnut plant in Oromocto, New Brunswick was closed and all 55 employees laid off. The last canoe, numbered 2 of 300 was sold to William Miller in Windsor, Ontario at the Canadian National Exhibition and was constructed after the plant had actually closed when he sent additional funds to have it completed. Most of the Chestnut molds survive and are being used in several wooden canoe shops in Canada. Swift Canoe in Ontario bought some of the molds and made Chestnut tribute canoes, including the Prospector model.

== Models ==
- Pleasure Models: General purpose recreational canoes, excellent for paddling and are the most commonly found models of Chestnut canoes. The 16 foot Pal is perhaps the most famous, but the 15 foot Twozer/Gooseberry/Chum is a current favorite among solo paddlers.
- Lightweight Pleasure Canoes: Built lighter than standard models, these include the 11 foot Featherweight and 15 foot 50-pound Special (commonly known as Bobs Special).

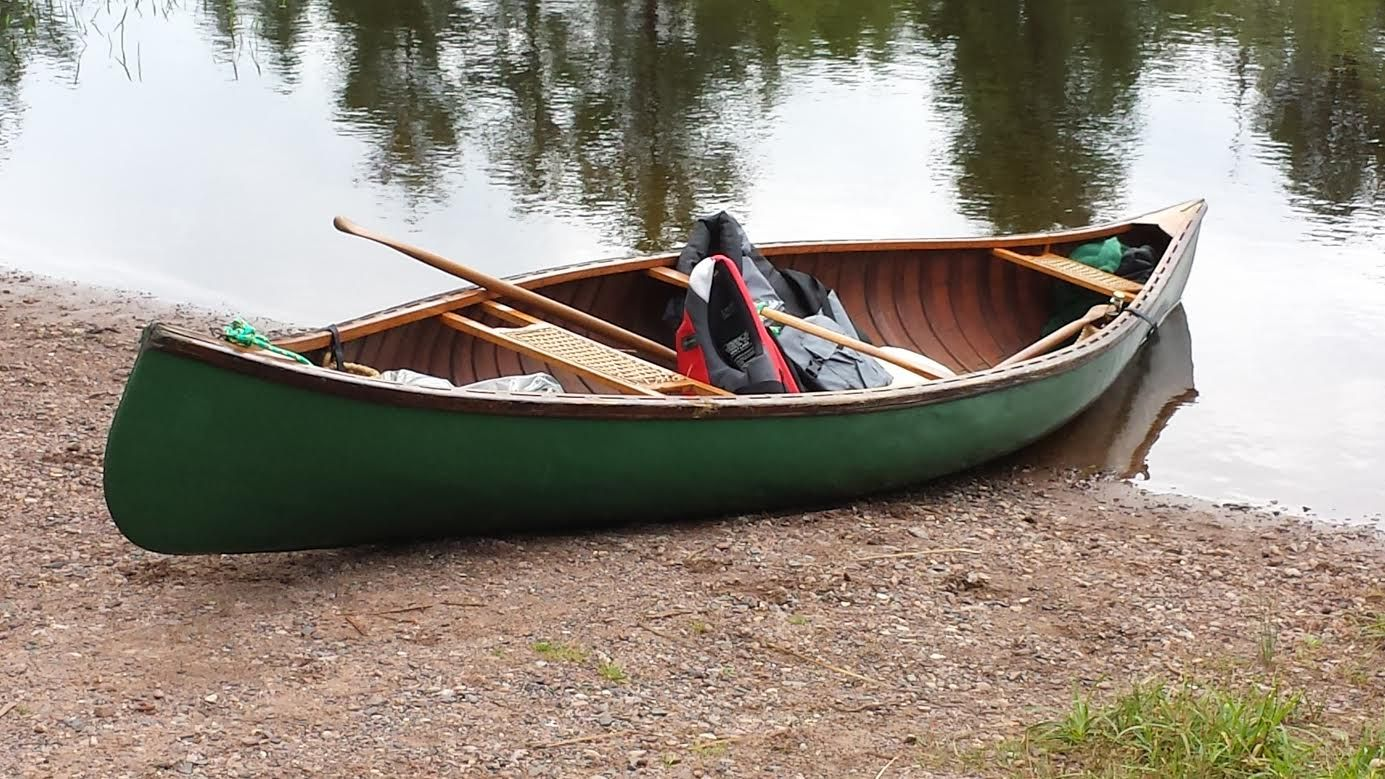
Chestnut Bobs Special, ready to go

- Prospector Models: Deeper and beamier than pleasure models of equivalent length, these canoes are meant to carry gear for extended trips; this model is the most widely copied by modern-day composite canoe builders. Prospector models were available in both double-ended and transom-sterned models.
- Trappers Canoes: A loose grouping of smaller canoes that has changed over the years. This class includes lower grade pleasure canoes and the Bantam, which is a 2nd grade version of Bobs Special.
- Cruisers Canoes: Designed to go fast, these models are narrower, more rounded across the bottom and have finer lines than other models. The Guides Special models are Cruisers that have close-ribbing.
- Freight Canoes: Bigger and beamier than the Prospector, these canoes have great carrying capacity. Available in both double-ended and transom-sterned configurations.
- Ogilvy Specials: Named for famous guides of New Brunswick, this model is designed for shallow, fast water canoeing, like that found on the famous salmon rivers of New Brunswick.

== Famous paddlers of the Chestnut canoe ==
- Bill Mason, Canadian naturalist, author, artist, filmmaker and conservationist, whose favorite Chestnut Prospector was donated to the Canadian Canoe Museum in Peterborough, Ontario following his death.
- American President Teddy Roosevelt, who purchased Chestnut canoes for a South American expedition.
- Grey Owl, who ordered "a 'guides special' 16 foot canvas covered canoe" for the production of his 1937 film The Trail – Men Against the River.
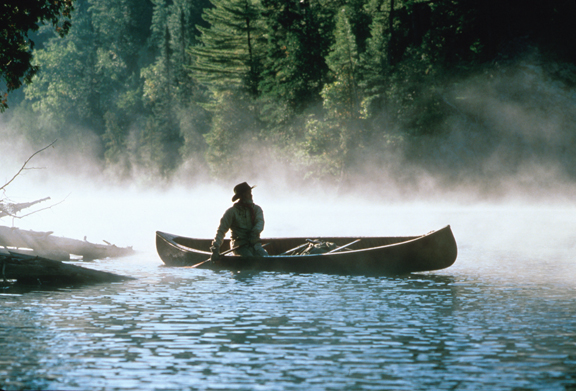
Bill Mason paddling one of his Chestnut canoes.

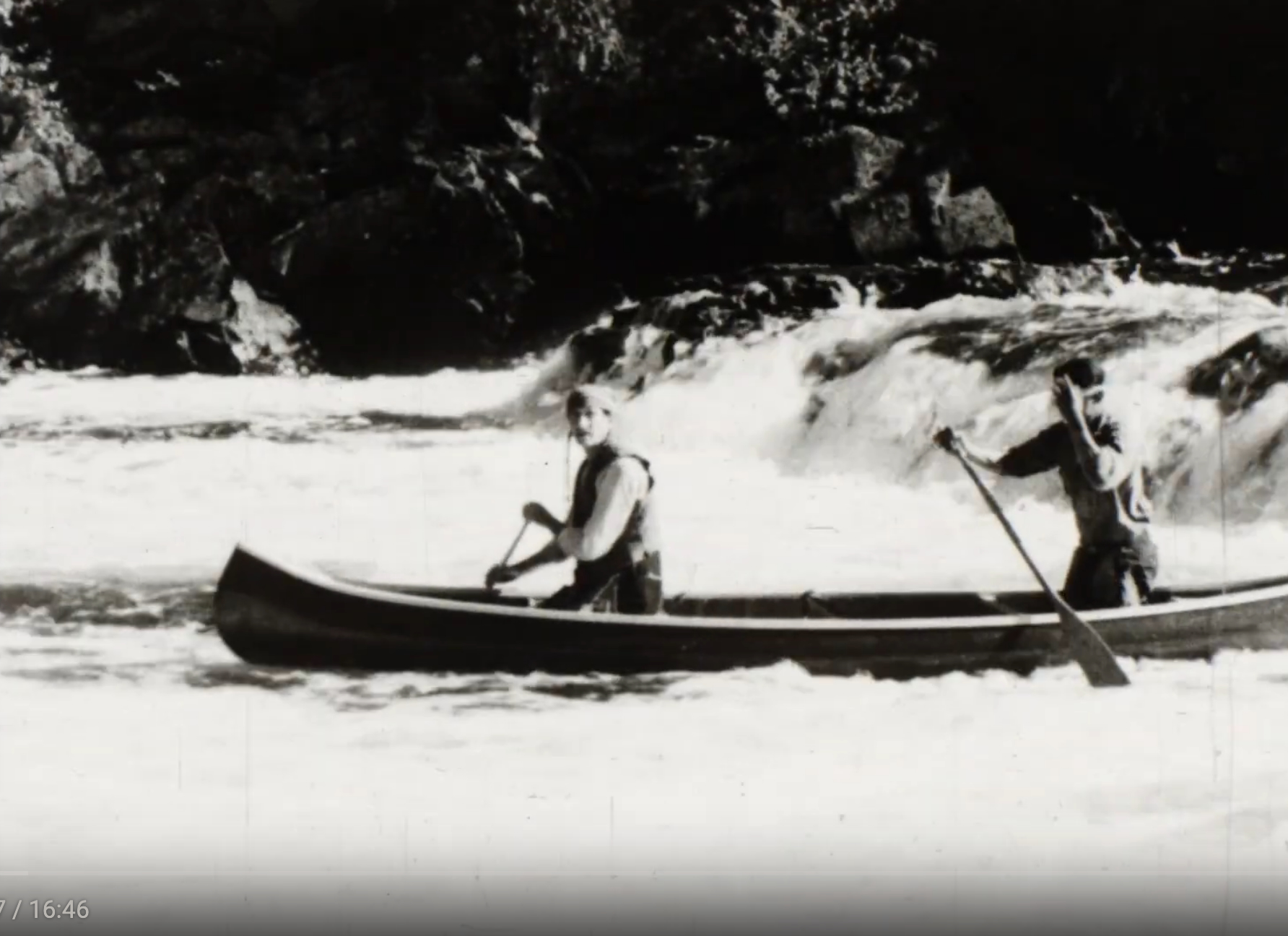
Grey Owl paddling in the bow of a canoe on the Mississagi River.

== Additional resources ==
- Macgregor, Roger, When the Chestnut was in Flower: Inside the Chestnut Canoe, Plumsweep Press, 1999.
- Solway, Kenneth, The Story of the Chestnut Canoe: 150 Years of Canadian Canoe Building, Nimbus Publishing, 1997.
- Facebook: Chestnut Canoe (a public group)
- Dragonfly Canoe Works, Discovering the History of Wooden Canoes: The Chestnut Canoe
- Canadian Canoe Museum
- Miller, Daniel and Benson Gray, editors, The Canadian Wood Canoe and Boat Company Catalog Collection, on CD-ROM.
