= Peterborough Canoe Company =

Canadian canoe manufacturing company 1892–1961

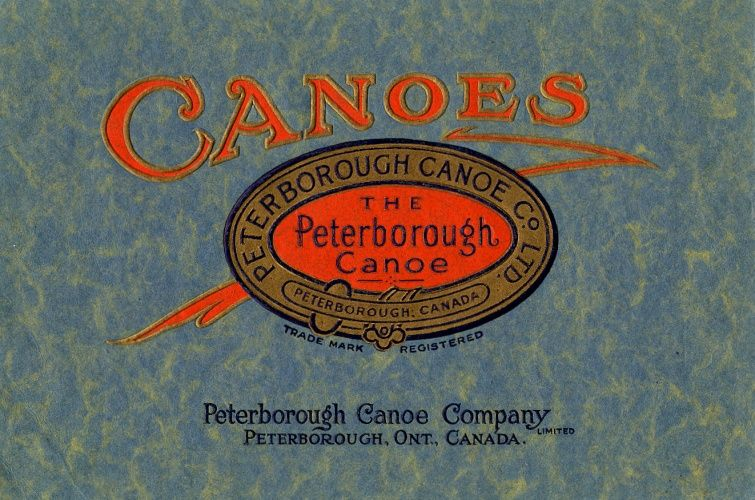
- Industry: Boat building
- Founded: 1892
- Founder: William H. Hill and Elihu Edwards
- Headquarters: Peterborough, Ontario
- Key people: James Z. Rogers
- Products: Canoes

The Peterborough Canoe Company, founded in 1892 by William H. Hill and Elihu Edwards, manufactured wooden canoes in a factory located at the corner of King and Water Streets in the city of Peterborough, Ontario, Canada, where quality wood and wood-canvas canoes and sporting goods were produced until 1961.

== History ==
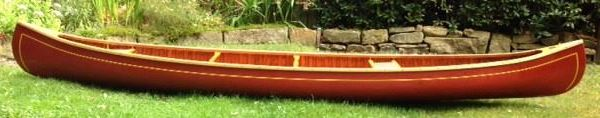
Side view of Peterborough canoe

Founded by William H. Hill and Elihu Edwards in 1892, the Peterborough Canoe Company was managed by James Z. Rogers. Just at the time that the company was starting up, another canoe company, the Ontario Canoe Company, closed because its factory suffered a serious fire. Many of the experienced canoe builders came to work at the Peterborough Canoe Company, and so the canoes produced by the two companies were similar: wide board, cedar strip and cedar rib construction. The canoes were mostly canvas covered.

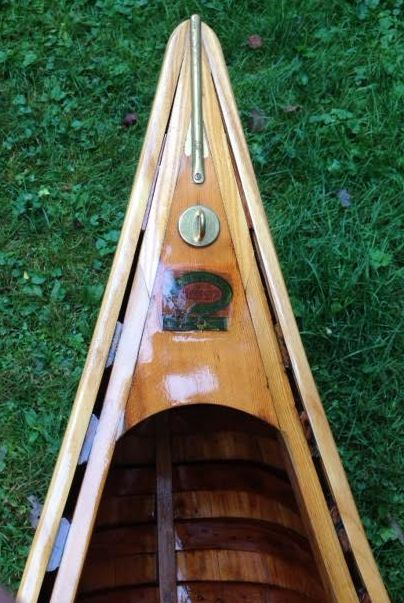
deck of Peterborough canoe

Canoes from the Peterborough Canoe Company were sold as far away as Europe. In 1915, the company bought one of its competitors, the William English Canoe Company. In 1923, it merged with a New Brunswick canoe maker, the Chestnut Canoe Company, and became Canadian Watercraft Ltd. Another Peterborough firm, the Canadian Canoe Company, was bought in 1928.

In 1948 Princess Elizabeth received a 16-foot cedar rib canoe made by this company as a wedding present from the City of Peterborough.

After World War II, the company became less profitable because of competition from makers of the new aluminum and fibreglass canoes, which were easier to mass-produce. The company began to manufacture wooden powerboats and sailboats, as well as related products such as duck decoys, water skis and surf boards. In 1961 the company ceased production.

== Today ==
Still, there are those who are willing to pay extra for a hand-crafted wooden canoe, and the forms and designs of the Peterborough canoes are still in use by canoe craftsmen today. The original boats are now prized as antiques and restored by hobbyists.

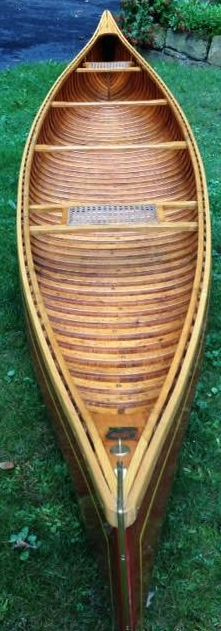
Interior of restored canoe

Canoe building is such an important part of Peterborough's history that the city has declared a National Canoe Day, which is celebrated near the end of June each year. The original site of the Peterborough Canoe Company boatworks is now Millennium Park, and on Canoe Day each year visitors can see a display of antique boats, some of them having returned to the very spot where they were built generations ago.

Examples of the Peterborough Canoe Company's products, as well as many other types of canoes, can be found at the Canadian Canoe Museum, located in Peterborough, and there is an example of the open style canoe in the collection of the National Maritime Museum Cornwall.
