= Canoe paddle strokes =

Ways of using canoe paddles

Canoe paddle strokes are the means by which a paddle (or paddles) is used to move a canoe through the water. Strokes are generally designated as flatwater or whitewater strokes. The strokes are also combined or modified. Some commonly known and used strokes are in the table below. Names for strokes can vary between geographical regions and even between paddlers with similar backgrounds.

== List of paddle strokes ==
In these illustrations, the bow (front) of the canoe is on the left side of the illustration and the stern (back) is on the right. The red arrow shows the paddle position at the beginning of the stroke.

Forward stroke	The forward stroke is the most often used canoe stroke, so executing this stroke efficiently yields much advantage to canoeists. It is initiated by placing the blade at a right angle to the centerline of the canoe and drawing it straight back.
Reverse stroke	The reverse stroke is essentially the same movement as the forward stroke, but performed in reverse. The back face of the blade is used in this case. This stroke is used to make the canoe go backward or to stop the canoe. The use of this stroke is also known as "back paddling".
J-stroke	The J-stroke is so named because, when done on the starboard side, it resembles the letter J. Some people, like Mike Galt, therefore preferred to call it the "Hook stroke" because then it is correct on both sides. It begins like a standard forward stroke, but towards the end the paddle is rotated and pushed away from the canoe with the power face of the paddle remaining the same throughout the stroke. This prying motion leads directing into the feathering - or recovery - increasing the efficiency of the J-stroke in flatwater. This conveniently counteracts the natural tendency of the canoe to steer away from the side of the solo or stern man's paddle side. It is used in reverse by the bowman to go straight while back paddling.
Goon	The Forward stroke with pry correction is often used by white water and beginning paddlers, because it is the easiest technique to paddle a straight course. Bill Mason called it the "Goon Stroke". Unlike the J-stroke in which the side of the paddle pushing against the water during the stroke (the power face) is the side which is used to straighten the canoe, this stroke uses the opposite face of the paddle to make the steering motion. It is somewhat like a J stroke with a small pry at the end. It is commonly thought to be less efficient than the J-stroke when paddling long distances across relatively calm water, because it lowers your stroke frequency more than the J-stroke.
Pitch stroke	The pitch stroke is the preferred stroke to go straight in a canoe with a good traveling speed, because this stroke tries to correct the yaw caused by the forward stroke almost on the same moment that it starts, where other correction strokes do this after the forward stroke, when there already is considerable yaw from the canoe. (The graphic here does not show this stroke right...)
Indian stroke	The Indian stroke may be used to paddle a straight course like the J. It can be useful against strong winds or running rapids. Move the paddle forward, rotate the grip of the paddle in the palm of your upper hand. Then you are ready for the next power stroke without taking the blade out of the water.
Pry stroke	The pry stroke begins with the paddle inserted vertically in the water, with the power face outward, and the shaft braced against the gunwale. A gentle prying motion is applied, forcing the canoe in the opposite direction of the paddling side.
Push-away stroke	The push-away stroke has an identical purpose to the pry stroke, but is performed differently. Instead of bracing the paddle against the gunwale, the paddle is held vertically, as in the draw stroke, and pushed away from the hull. This is more awkward and requires more force than the pry, but has the advantage of preventing damage to the paddle and canoe due to rubbing on the gunwale. It also uses force more efficiently, since the paddle is pushing straight out, instead of up and out.
Running pry	The running pry stroke, also known as a "cut", can be applied while the canoe is moving. As in the standard pry, the paddle is turned sideways and braced against the gunwale, but rather than forcing the paddle away from the hull, the paddler simply turns it at an angle and allows the motion of the water to provide the force.
Draw stroke	The draw stroke exerts a force opposite to that of the pry. The paddle is inserted vertically in the water at arm's length from the gunwale, with the power face toward the canoe, and is then pulled inward to the paddler's hip. A draw can be applied while moving to create a running or hanging draw. For maximum efficiency, if multiple draw strokes are required, the paddle can be turned 90° and sliced through the water away from the boat between strokes. This prevents the paddler from having to lift the paddle out of the water and replace it for each stroke.
Sculling draw	The sculling draw stroke is an efficient and stable stroke where multiple draw strokes are required. Instead of performing repeated draw strokes, the paddle is "sculled" back and forth through the water. Beginning slightly in front of the paddler, the paddle is angled so that the power face points at a 45° angle toward the hull and astern. The paddle is drawn straight backward, maintaining the angle, and then the angle is rotated so that the power face is pointing 45° toward the hull and the bow. The paddle is pushed straight forward, and the whole process is repeated. The net effect is that the paddler in the canoe is drawn toward the paddling side.
Reverse scull	The reverse scull (sometimes sculling pry or sculling push-away) is the opposite of the scull. The stroke is identical, but with the paddle angles reversed. The net effect is that the paddler is pushed away from the paddling side. The graphic has the arrows going the wrong way, but you get the picture.
Cross-draw stroke	The cross-draw stroke or cross-bow draw is a stroke that exerts the same vector of force as a pry, by moving the blade of the paddle to the other side of the canoe without moving the paddler's hands. The arm of bottom hand crosses in front of the bowman's body to insert the paddle in the water on the opposite side of the canoe some distance from the gunwale, facing towards the canoe, and is then pulled inward while the top hand pushes outward. The cross-draw is much stronger than the pry stroke, but normally can't be used by the stern paddler in a tandem canoe.
Sweep	The sweep is unique in that it steers the canoe away from the paddle regardless of which end of the canoe it is performed in. The paddle is inserted in the water some distance from the gunwale, facing forward, and is drawn backward in a wide sweeping motion. The paddler's bottom hand is choked up to extend the reach of the paddle. In the case of the bowman, the blade will pull a quarter-circle from the bow to the paddler's waist. If in the stern, the paddler pulls from the waist to the stern of the canoe. Backsweeps are the same stroke done in reverse.
C-stroke	The C-stroke is used in solo paddling. It is generally used to turn the canoe to the side opposite of the solo paddler. This is opposite to a sweep. It serves the same purpose as a J-stroke (counteracting the natural turn of the canoe away from the paddling side), but provides more correction which is necessary when starting a solo canoe from a standstill or paddling in strong wind or current.

== Variations ==
There are some differences in techniques in how the above strokes are utilized. One of these techniques involves locking or nearly locking the elbow, that is on the side of the canoe the paddle is, to minimize muscular usage of that arm to increase endurance. Another benefit of this technique is that along with using less muscle you gain longer strokes which results in an increase of the power to stroke ratio. This is generally used more with the 'stay on one side' method of paddling. The other technique is where they bend the elbow to pull the paddle out of the water before they have finished the stroke. This is generally used more with the 'switch sides often' method of paddling. There is also the Maine Guide stroke which is like The Pitch stroke but the blade is feathered as it leaves the water with a kick.

=== Stay on one side method ===
The stay on one side method is where each canoeist takes opposite sides and the stern paddler uses occasional J-strokes to correct direction of travel. The side chosen can be based on the wind and/or current direction, so the stern paddler's forward strokes are pushing the boat in the opposite direction the wind and/or current is, reducing the number of J-strokes required to keep forward momentum; or sides can be chosen based on the paddlers' stronger side, since this is more comfortable and less tiring. A combination of methods for picking sides can be used, and some canoeists will switch sides after twenty to thirty minutes or longer as a means of lessening muscle fatigue, when changing the direction of the boat, or in response to new weather conditions. Paddlers must paddle on opposite sides from each other except when trying to turn the boat quickly, or in high winds or strong currents.

=== Switch sides often method ===
The switch sides often method, also called sit and switch, hit and switch, hut stroke, Minnesota switch or North American Touring Technique, can be described as the paddling technique where one uses the switching of paddling sides to go straight or maneuver. The spoken command "Hut!" is sometimes used by the stern paddler to alert the person paddling the bow to switch sides, giving rise to the term "Hut stroke". This technique is intended to avoid correction strokes after the forward stroke to make a very high stroke frequency possible thus enabling paddling with high speeds for a long time. Maneuvers are generally performed by switching paddling sides (e.g., for a turn to the left, the solo/stern paddler paddles on the right side of the canoe and vice versa.) For this method, in certain situations, two tandem paddlers may paddle on the same side. This method is one of the fastest on flat water and mostly used by marathon canoeists in the US and Canada.

== Canoe Roll ==
Like in the case of a kayak, a properly outfitted canoe can be rolled: that is, righted from a capsized position without the paddler exiting the craft. The American Canoe Association teaches the low brace roll, where the back face of the paddle is used to push against the surface of the water to provide resistance for the hip snap to act against.
