= Thompson Brothers Boat Manufacturing Company =

US manufacturer of pleasure boats

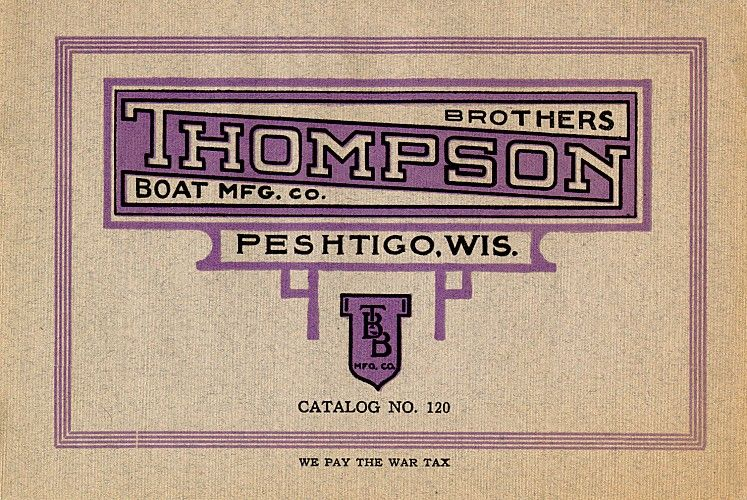

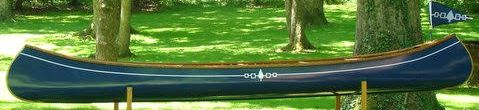
Thompson Hiawatha model canoe

The Thompson Brothers Boat Manufacturing Company of Peshtigo, Wisconsin, was a manufacturer of pleasure boats and canoes. Founded by brothers Peter and Christ Thompson in 1904, the company became prominent in the field and built boats for nearly one hundred years. The Thompson Antique & Classic Boat Rally celebrates the company's history with a boat show every other year and in 2013 the Thompson Brothers canoe was celebrated at the Annual Assembly of the Wooden Canoe Heritage Association.

== History ==
=== Early years ===
The Thompson family came from Denmark and settled at Racine, Wisconsin. About 1899 they moved to undeveloped farmland near Peshtigo.

The Thompson Brothers firm started operations at Peshtigo in the early months of 1904. Peter and Christian (Christ) Thompson, the elder brothers of a large family, made their first wooden boat in the hayloft of the family barn in early 1904. Local lumber was used, harvested in along the banks of the Peshtigo River. The first product was a modified lapstrake canoe, dubbed the "Anti-Leak" canoe by the brothers.

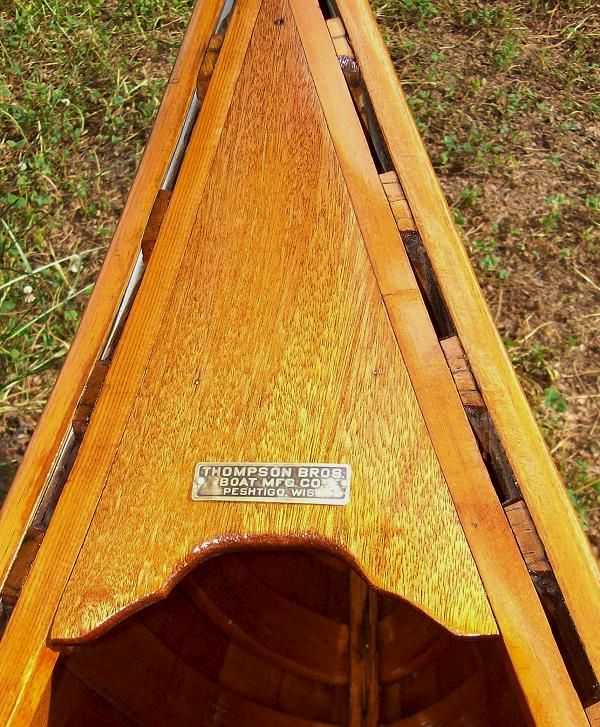
Thompson badge on ogee-style deck

Thompson Bros. Boat Mfg. Co. was incorporated in 1912. By that time, six Thompson brothers were involved: Peter, Christ, Edward, Theodore, Adolh (Tom), and Richard. Their sister Hanna (Johanna) was office manager. A new factory complex was built within the city limits of Peshtigo in 1912 and the operation was moved from the cramped quarters at the Thompson farm, a few miles north of town. Thompson soon became the largest builder of outboard boats in the world and in 1924 a branch factory was secured in Cortland, New York.

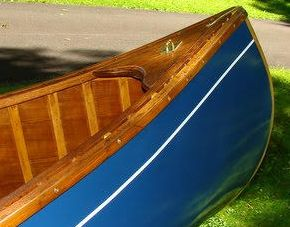
alternate deck style: a simple curve

=== Middle years ===
In 1953 second generation Thompson family men (Ray, Glenn, Roy, Grant, Bob, and Ted, Jr.) started Cruisers, Inc., a builder of wooden lapstrake boats at Oconto, Wisconsin. Cruisers was formed with the full knowledge, encouragement, and cooperation of the elder Thompson men and Thompson Bros. Boat Mfg. Co. In fact, for the first year of operation, Cruisers, Inc. made boats for Thompson Bros. Boat Mfg. Co. which were badged with the "Thompson" logo.

By the mid 1950s Thompson Bros. Boat switched from primarily making cedar strip built hulls to plywood lapstrake boats. The greater horsepower outboard motors were better suited to the very strong yet lightweight lapstrake hulls.

Effective 1 January 1959 the three boat operations owned by the Thompson family at Peshtigo, Cortland, and Oconto were split amongst family branches. Thompson Bros. Boat Mfg. Co. at Peshtigo became property of Ray Thompson and family. The former branch at Cortland, New York became Thompson Boat Company of New York, Inc. with ownership in the hands of brothers Bob and Ted Thompson, Jr. and their cousin Glenn Thompson. Brothers Roy and G.Grant Thompson gained sole ownership of Cruisers at Oconto. All three firms made wooden lapstrake outboard boats.

In 1960 Glenn Thompson decided to return to Wisconsin and venture out on his own. He established T & T Boats, Inc. and a factory was built in Wausaukee, Wisconsin. T & T also made wooden lapstrake outboard and inboard/outboard boats. It lasted until a liquidation auction signaled the firm's end in May 1965.

Thompson Bros. Boat at Peshtigo was one of the earliest boatbuilders to embrace the new inboard/outboard propulsion unit that was introduced to the boating public at the New York Boat Show in early 1959. Volvo Penta of Sweden was the first to make a practical inboard/outboard engine and outdrive. By the summer of 1959 Thompson was installing these in their 17-ft. Sea Lancer and 19-ft. Off-Shore models as options.

The transition from wood to fiberglass at all the Thompson operated boat firms was difficult. The family resisted the switch and felt that any high quality wooden boat could out perform, outlast, and outsell fiberglass; however, the 1960s consumer shied away from wood and purchased fiberglass or aluminum pleasure boats, and sales plummeted.

=== Twilight years ===
Thompson Boat Company of New York, Inc. of Cortland, New York was purchased by Chris-Craft Industries in January 1962 and it became a wholly owned subsidiary. An immediate program of fiberglass boat development began. This initiative created the Corsair fiberglass division of Chris-Craft. The Corsair boats were made by Thompson Boat Company of New York in Cortland.

In late 1964 Thompson Bros. Boat Mfg. Co. at Peshtigo, Wisconsin subcontracted with Crownline, Inc. of Cairo, Illinois to have the latter make fiberglass boats for them. This was a low-cost means for Thompson to get an abbreviated line of fiberglass boats to supplement their wooden boat line. The arrangement did not last long as Crownline was having major financial difficulties. When Crownline closed down, Peter Thompson - the grandson of the original Peter Thompson - and another team member went to Cairo and retrieved the Thompson molds and tooling. It was too little and too late. The Thompson creditors in 1966 forced the sale of the company and Saul Padek got control of all the stock for less than $4,000 cash layout. The Thompson family was out of the boat business at Peshtigo.

Under Padek's ownership Thompson Bros. Boat Mfg. Co. declared chapter 11 bankruptcy in September 1966. Padek began the slow painful switch from wood to fiberglass and by 1969 the last wooden boat rolled out of the plant at Peshtigo.

Cruisers, Inc. also resisted the change from wood to RFP. Grant Thompson researched markets, production methods, designs, and costs. Slowly they began making some fiberglass products. The relationships they had made with other boat makers over the years paid off. Cruisers, Inc. was able to get licensing deals with other entrenched fiberglass builders. This helped ease them from wood to glass. By 1967 they had dropped all wooden boats from their product line. The financial loss was significant. The company went from one of the most successful in the industry to just barely hanging on in a matter of a few years. The rebuilding took many years. Today, this is the only Thompson originated boat firm that still operates. It is called Cruisers Yachts and is a division of KCS International.

T & T Boats of Wausaukee never made fiberglass boats. A liquidation auction in May 1965 signaled their demise. Chris-Craft closed the Cortland plant in 1974 which had been a Thompson operation.

Thompson Boat at Peshtigo went bankrupt and closed in 1980. A Thompson dealer in the Detroit area bought the assets from the bankruptcy court and the entire operation was moved from Peshtigo to St. Charles, Michigan that year. 76 years of boat building tradition at Peshtigo came to an end.

The revitalized Thompson Boat at St. Charles slowly rebuilt, but bankruptcy was declared in 1993. A new owner came in and got the firm going again. By about 1997 regular production ceased and all boat production stopped by 2000 or 2001. A liquidation auction in 2002 signaled the end of almost 100 years of boat building history.

The 2013 Assembly of the Wooden Canoe Heritage Association featured Thompson Brothers canoes.

== Thompson canoe models ==
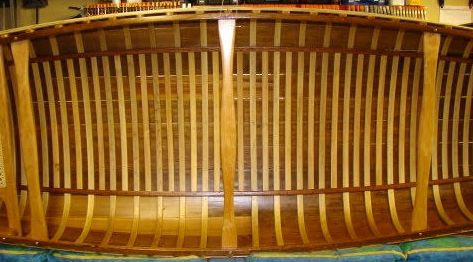
inside of Hiawatha model showing half-ribs and stringers

- Indian: Standard Thompson model, without half ribs.
- Hiawatha: Built on the same mold as the Indian Model; has half ribs with ends covered by a stringer.
- Ranger: This model has a very flat sheer.

== Thompson boats ==
... graceful bow lines, combined with ruggedness and safety, made it a favorite for a variety of water sports, fishing, or just cruising the shore.

Thompson marketed boats of types that reflected the evolving desires of consumers: skiffs, duck boats, a variety of fishing boats, racing boats, sailboats, various boats for the military during World War II, and small cruisers. Their signature boat was the lapstrake lake runabout of the 1950s and 60's.
