= Burnside =

Burnside may refer to:

== Places ==
=== Antarctica ===
- Burnside Ridges, Oates Land

=== Australia ===
- City of Burnside, a local government area of Adelaide, South Australia
  - Burnside, South Australia, a suburb of the City of Burnside
- Burnside, New South Wales, in the Oatlands suburb of Sydney
- Burnside, Queensland, a suburb in the Sunshine Coast Region
- Burnside, Victoria, a suburb of Melbourne
- Burnside, Western Australia, in the South West region
- Lake Burnside, in the Gibson Desert, Western Australia

=== Canada ===
- Burnside, Nova Scotia, an urban neighbourhood in Dartmouth, Nova Scotia
- Burnside Drive, a road in Dartmouth, Nova Scotia
- Burnside, Colchester County, an unincorporated rural community in Nova Scotia
- Burnside Hall, a building on the downtown campus of McGill University, Montreal, Quebec
- Burnside, Newfoundland and Labrador, a coastal community in Newfoundland
- Burnside, Ontario, in the township of Severn
- Burnside River, Nunavut

=== New Zealand ===
- Burnside, Christchurch, a suburb
- Burnside, Dunedin, a suburb

=== Northern Ireland ===
- Burnside, County Antrim, a townland in County Antrim

=== Scotland ===
- Burnside, South Lanarkshire, an area of Rutherglen
- Burnside, Highland, a district of Thurso
- Burnside of Duntrune, a hamlet in Angus
- Whome, a village in the Orkney Islands

=== United States ===
- Burnside, Arizona, a census-designated place
- Burnside, Chicago, a community area of Chicago, Illinois
- Burnside, Illinois, an unincorporated town in Hancock County
- Burnside, Iowa
- Burnside, Kentucky, a city in Pulaski County
- Burnside, Louisiana
- Burnside, Mississippi
- Burnside, Pennsylvania
- Burnside, Wisconsin, a town in Trempealeau County
- Burnside Bridge, a drawbridge in Portland, Oregon
  - Burnside Skatepark, below Burnside Bridge
- Burnside Park, Providence, Rhode Island
- Burnside Street, a street in Portland, Oregon
- Burnside Township, Michigan
  - Burnside, Michigan, an unincorporated community
- Burnside Township, Clearfield County, Pennsylvania
- Burnside Township, Centre County, Pennsylvania
- Burnside Triangle, a district in Portland, Oregon

== People with the surname ==
=== In sport ===
- Adrian Burnside (born 1977), Australian baseball player
- Brenda Burnside (born 1963), former boxing "journeywoman"
- Cara-Beth Burnside (born 1968), American skateboarder and snowboarder
- Geoffery Burnside (born 1950), Bahamian cyclist
- George Burnside (American football) (1899–1962), blocking back in the National Football League
- Laurence Burnside (born 1946), Bahamian cyclist
- Pete Burnside (1930–2022), baseball pitcher
- Sheldon Burnside (born 1954), Major League Baseball player

=== In entertainment ===
- Cedric Burnside (born 1978), American electric blues drummer, guitarist, singer and songwriter
- Iain Burnside, Scottish classical pianist, accompanist and radio presenter
- John Burnside (1955–2024), Scottish writer
- R. H. Burnside (1870–1952), actor, director, producer, composer, and playwright
- R. L. Burnside (1926–2005), blues musician
- Stanley Burnside (born 1947), Bahamian cartoonist and painter

=== In business, politics, and law ===
- Ambrose Burnside (1824–1881), American soldier, railroad executive, inventor, industrialist, and politician
- Bruce Burnside (1833–1909), Chief Justice and Queen's Advocate of Ceylon
- David Burnside (born 1951), Northern Ireland politician and public relations expert
- Jon Burnside, Canadian politician
- Julian Burnside (born 1949), Australian barrister, human rights and refugee advocate, and author
- Maurice G. Burnside (1902–1991), professor, tobacco warehouse manager, and US Representative
- Robert Bruce Burnside (1862–1929), Australian judge
- Robert H. Burnside (1933–2021), American politician
- Thomas Burnside (1782–1851), US Representative from Pennsylvania

=== In the sciences ===
- John Burnside (inventor) (1916–2008), American inventor and gay rights activist, known for inventing the teleidoscope, darkfield kaleidoscope, and Symmetricon
- William Snow Burnside (1839–1920), Irish mathematician
- William Burnside (1852–1927), English mathematician
  - Burnside's lemma, an orbit-counting theorem in group theory
  - Burnside's problem, about whether certain groups must be finite
  - Burnside's theorem, a proof that certain finite groups are solvable

=== Other ===
- Bob Burnside, first president of the United States Lifesaving Association
- Frank Herbert Burnside (1888–1935), pioneer airmail pilot
- George Burnside (Concerned Brethren) (1908–1994), New Zealand evangelist
- Joe Burnside (1930–2008), Britain's longest surviving heart transplant patient
- Robert Burnside (minister) (1759–1826), English Baptist minister
- Scott Burnside (born 1963), Canadian journalist and sportswriter

=== Fictional people ===
- Frank Burnside, a fictional character in British television series The Bill and titular character of its spin-off Burnside
- Neil Burnside, central protagonist of British television series The Sandbaggers
- William Burnside (comics), a fictional incarnation of Captain America

== Other uses ==
- Burnside rules, a set of rules that transformed Canadian football from a rugby-style game to a gridiron-style game
- Burnside (TV series), a spin-off from The Bill

== See also ==
- Burneside, a village in Cumbria, England
- Burnsides (disambiguation)
- Burntside (disambiguation)
- Byrneside, Victoria, Australia
- Byrnside-Beirne-Johnson House, a historic house in West Virginia, United States
