= Burntside =

Burntside may refer to:

- Burntside, Minnesota, unincorporated community in Saint Louis County, Minnesota, United States
- Burntside Lake, 3 miles northwest of Ely, Minnesota, in St. Louis County, Minnesota, United States
- Burntside Lodge, resort located on Burntside Lake several miles out of Ely, Minnesota, United States
- Burntside River, river of Minnesota, United States
- Burntside State Forest, state forest located near the town of Ely in Lake and St. Louis counties, Minnesota, United States
- Dead River (Burntside River), river of Minnesota, United States

== See also ==
- Bournside
- Burneside
- Burnside (disambiguation)
