= Robert Burnside =

Robert Burnside may refer to:

- Robert Burnside (minister) (1759–1826), English Baptist minister
- Robert A. Burnside (born 1948), American judge
- Robert H. Burnside (1933–2021), American politician in the state of South Carolina
- Robert Bruce Burnside (1862–1929), Australian barrister and judge
- Bob Burnside (1932–2019), American lifeguard
- R. H. Burnside (1873–1952), American actor, director, and playwright
- R. L. Burnside (1926–2005), American blues singer, songwriter and guitarist
