= Bull-of-the-Woods Logging Scow =

Shipwreck in northern Minnesota

- U.S. National Register of Historic Places
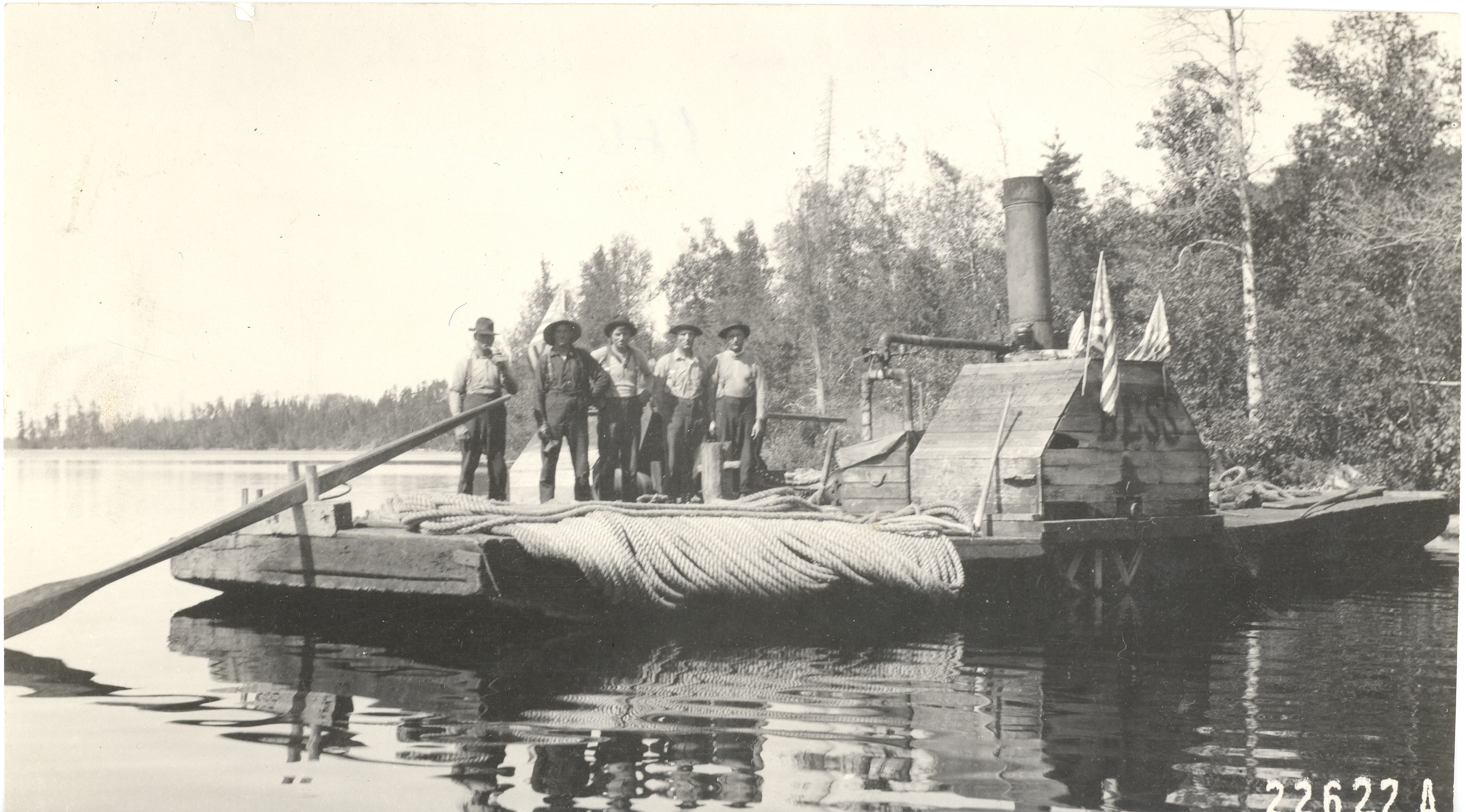
- St. Croix Logging and Milling Company photo of the scow and crew in Birch Lake, Minnesota

- Location within Minnesota Location within the United States
- Location: Hoist Bay, Burntside Lake, Morse Township, Minnesota
- Coordinates: 47°53′45″N 92°1′33″W
- Area: Less than one acre
- Built: circa 1893
- Built by: Unknown
- MPS: Shipwrecks of Minnesota's Inland Lakes and Rivers MPS
- NRHP reference No.: 99000189
- Added to NRHP: February 12, 1999

The Bull-of-the-Woods Logging Scow is a small paddle steamer wrecked in Burntside Lake in Morse Township, Minnesota, United States. It was built no earlier than 1893 for one of the lumber companies operating in the area. It is a small, flat-bottomed vessel outfitted with a steam donkey modified to power the vessel as well as a winch. There were at least a few of these vessels in operation in northeastern Minnesota in the late 19th and early 20th centuries, where they were locally known as "alligators" or "gators". With the steam-powered winch and shallow paddle wheels, they could tow timber rafts, hoist logs, navigate shallow waters, and even pull themselves across dry land. This vessel may have remained in service as late as 1926, when the last lumber company ceased operations on Burntside Lake. It is the only known surviving example of its type.

The wreck site was listed on the National Register of Historic Places in 1999 for its significance in the themes of architecture, historical archaeology, industry, and maritime history. It was nominated as the only known example of a distinctive and little-documented vessel type, important for transportation for the region's lumber companies. It was also noted as a symbol of the increasing mechanization of the industry and a potential site for archaeological research into its design and construction.

== See also ==
- National Register of Historic Places listings in St. Louis County, Minnesota
