= Listening Point =

- U.S. National Register of Historic Places
- U.S. Historic district
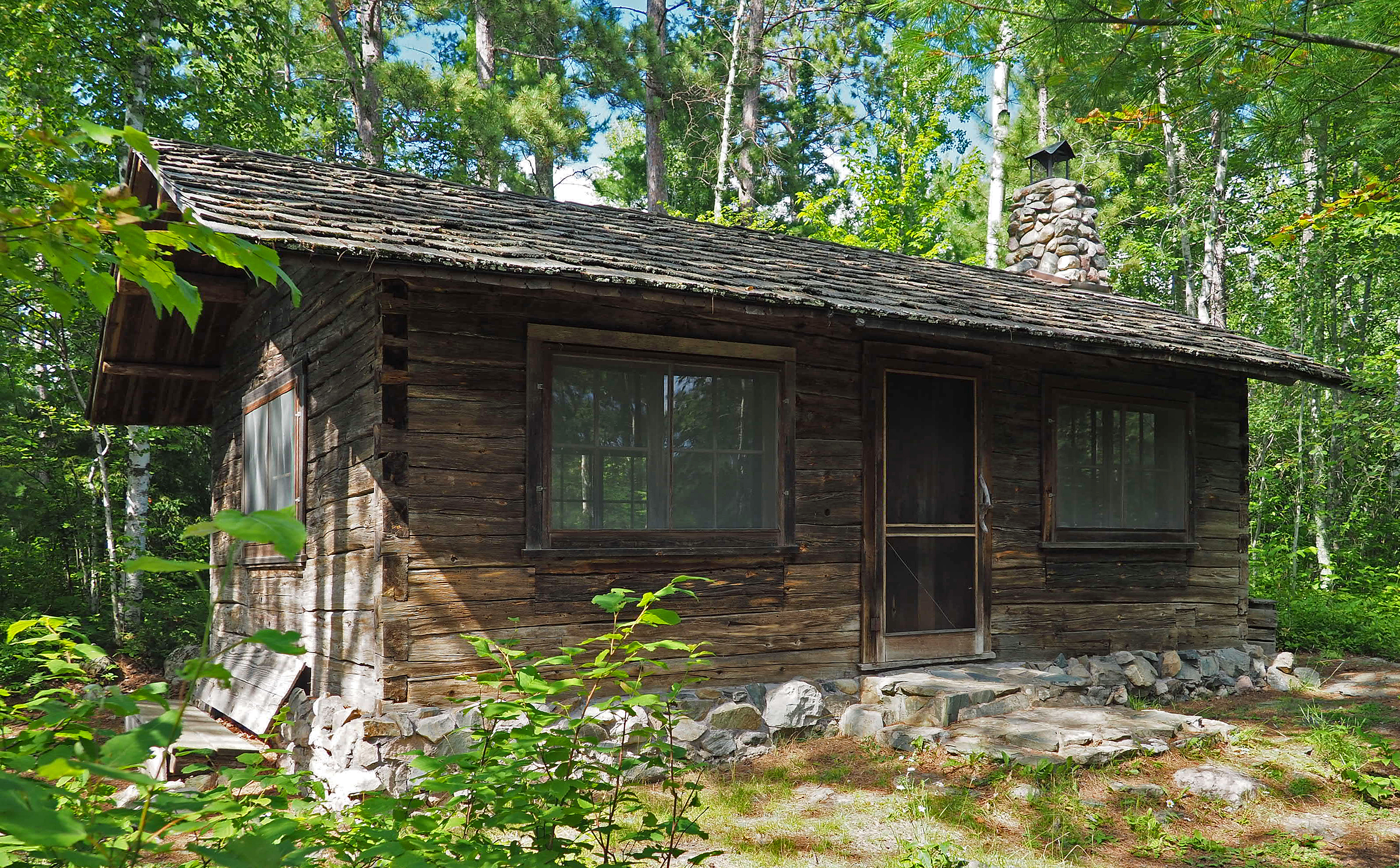
- Sigurd F. Olson's cabin at Listening Point

- Location within Minnesota Location within the United States
- Location: 3128 Van Vac Road, Morse Township, Minnesota
- Coordinates: 47°54′11″N 92°1′1″W
- Area: 20 acres (8 ha)
- Built: 1956–1982
- NRHP reference No.: 07001316
- Added to NRHP: December 26, 2007

Listening Point was the private retreat of conservationist Sigurd F. Olson (1899–1982) on Burntside Lake in Morse Township, Minnesota, United States. Olson acquired the property in 1956, then purchased a log cabin and a log sauna elsewhere that he had dismantled, moved to Listening Point, and reassembled. In 1998 the Listening Point Foundation was organized to preserve the property as an open-air museum to Olson.

In 2007 Listening Point was listed on the National Register of Historic Places for its national significance in the themes of conservation and literature. The historic district consists of five contributing properties: the cabin, the sauna, an outhouse, a dock, and the network of trails. The property was nominated for its association with Sigurd Olson, whose writing and advocacy had a national impact on conservation. Olson began his work in the 1920s, opposing development of the Boundary Waters, and capped his career with the passage of the Wilderness Act in 1964.

The Listening Point Foundation offers tours and events at the site, designed to limit impacts to its historic and natural integrity.

== See also ==
- List of museums in Minnesota
- National Register of Historic Places listings in St. Louis County, Minnesota
