= Backes =

Backes (pronounced Backs or BACK-uhs) is a German surname. Notable people with the name include:

- Constanze Backes, German soprano in opera and concert
- David Backes (born 1984), American ice hockey player
- David Backes (author) (born 1957), American author and professor
- Fernand Backes (born 1930), Luxembourgish boxer
- Joan Backes, American artist
- Nadine Backes (born 1985), German politician
- Ron Backes (born 1963), American shot putter
- Scott Backes (born 1957), American mountaineer
- Yuriko Backes (born 1970), Luxembourgish diplomat and politician

== See also ==
- Backes & Strauss, English company that designs and produces high-end luxury timepieces and jewellery
- Back (disambiguation)
- Bakes, surname
