= Bakes =

Bakes is a surname. Notable people with the name include:

- Martin Bakes (1937–2025), English footballer

== See also ==
- David Bakes Baker (born 1986), American poker player nicknamed Bakes
- Baking
- Backes, German surname
- Bakeš, Czech surname
