= Burnsides =

Burnsides may refer to:

- Sideburns, a style of facial hair
- Burnsides, West Virginia, an unincorporated community in the United States

== See also ==
- Ambrose Burnside, an American Union civil war general
- Burnside (disambiguation)
