= Sigurd F. Olson =

American writer, environmentalist and advocate

Sigurd Ferdinand Olson
- Born: April 4, 1899; Chicago, Illinois
- Died: January 13, 1982 (aged 82)
- Education: Northland College; University of Wisconsin–Madison; University of Illinois
- Occupations: Teacher, nature writer, President of The Wilderness Society (1963–1971)
- Notable work: The Singing Wilderness
- Spouse: Elizabeth Dorothy Uhrenholdt
- Awards: John Burroughs Medal (1974)

Sigurd Ferdinand Olson (April 4, 1899 – January 13, 1982) was an American writer, environmentalist, and advocate for the protection of wilderness. For more than thirty years, he served as a wilderness guide in the lakes and forests of the Quetico-Superior country of northern Minnesota and western Ontario. He was known honorifically as the Bourgeois — a term the voyageurs of old used of their trusted leaders.

== Biography ==
Born in Chicago, Illinois to Swedish Baptist parents; his mother's family came over from Skabersjö, Svedala in Scania and his father's from Nås, Vansbro in Dalarna. The family moved to northern Wisconsin where Olson grew up and developed his lifelong interest in the outdoors. They moved first to Sister Bay, then Prentice, then Ashland.

Olson entered Northland College in September, 1916, completing two years before enrolling at the University of Wisconsin where he graduated in 1920. After graduating, Olson took a job teaching animal husbandry, botany, and geology at high schools in the mining towns of Nashwauk and Keewatin, Minnesota. In June 1921, after his first year of teaching, Olson took his first canoe trip where he fell in love with the canoe country wilderness of northern Minnesota that would become the Boundary Waters Canoe Area Wilderness (with his help). His first article, an account of a canoe expedition, was published by the Milwaukee Journal on July 31, 1921. In August of that year, Olson married Elizabeth Dorothy Uhrenholdt, and the two spent their honeymoon on another canoe trip in the Boundary Waters.

Olson returned to the University of Wisconsin in the fall of 1922, pursuing a master's degree with the goal of becoming a field geologist. During this time, Elizabeth worked as a grade school teacher in Hayward, Wisconsin. In Madison, Olson was a pupil of Charles Kenneth Leith and Alexander Newton Winchell. Olson quickly became disillusioned with a career in geology, and, learning that his wife was pregnant, he dropped out after one semester. The Olsons moved to Ely in early 1923, where Sigurd taught high school biology and worked at Ely Junior College (now Minnesota North College - Vermilion). Olson also worked as a canoe guide for J.C. Russell's outfitters on Fall Lake in Winton, Minnesota. He led canoe expeditions for a group that became known as the "Voyageurs," which routinely included Eric W. Morse, Denis Coolican, Blair Fraser, Tony Lovink, Elliott Rodger, and Omond Solandt. In 1929, Olson and two business partners bought J.C. Russell's and renamed it Border Lakes Outfitting Company.

Unhappy with his teaching career and worried about his ability to succeed as a writer, Olson became interested in graduate school again in the late 1920s. He discussed ecology opportunities in letters to Aldo Leopold, who recommended the University of Michigan, but Olson accepted an offer at the University of Illinois instead. At Illinois, Olson was advised by Victor Shelford. Although he earned good grades, Olson hated laboratory work and increasingly devoted his focus to writing. He completed his master's thesis on predator control, focusing specifically on wolves, but he dropped out before it could be approved.

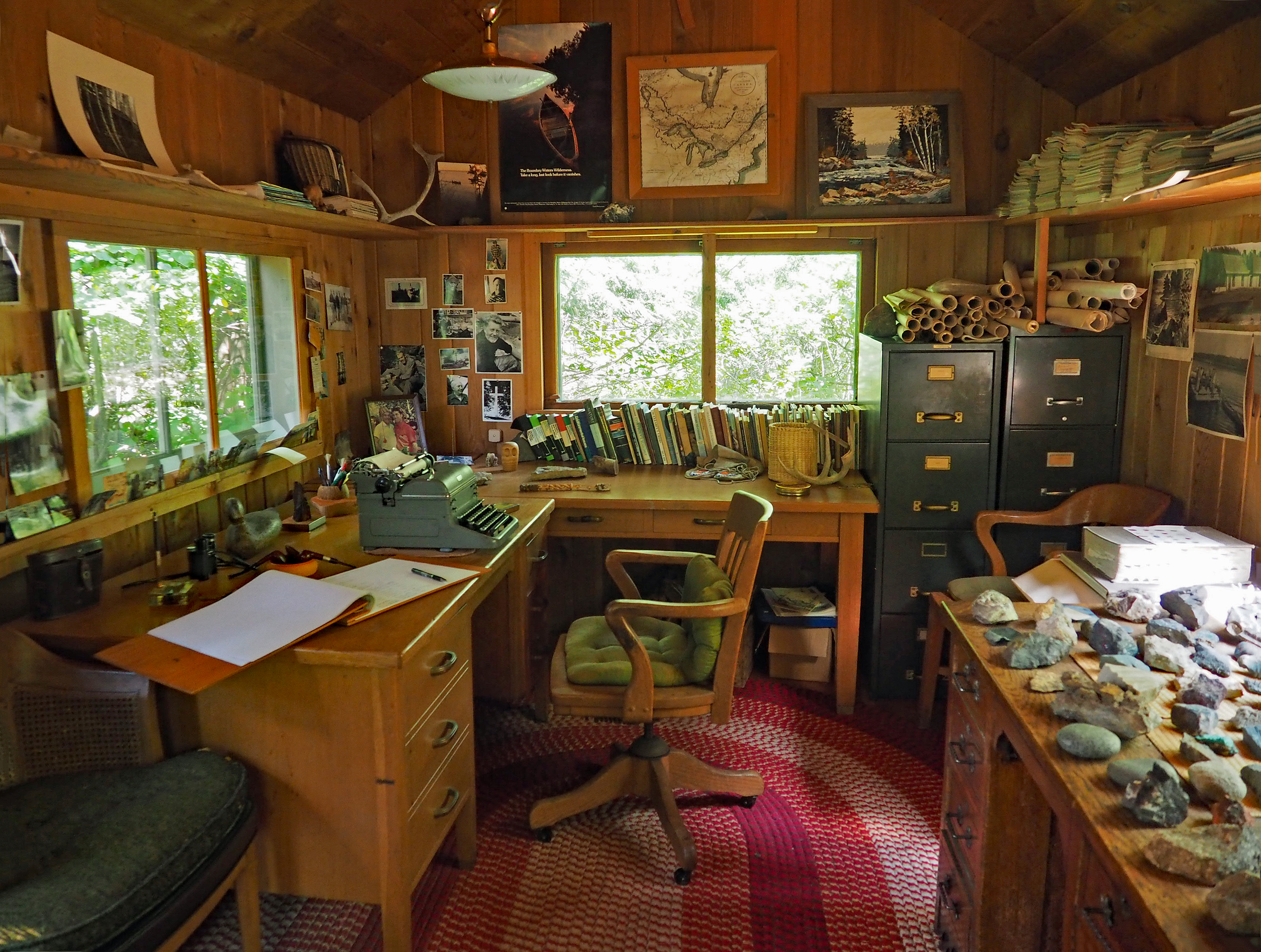
Sigurd F. Olson Writing Shack interior, Ely, Minnesota

The Olsons returned to Ely in 1932, and Sigurd resumed work at the high school and Junior College, where he later chaired the science department and served as dean beginning in 1936. In 1947, he resigned from his teaching position and began writing full-time. He spent most of his life in the Ely area, working as a canoe guide during the summer months, teaching, and writing about the natural history, ecology, and outdoor life in and around the Boundary Waters.

On August 27, 1971, a little over a year after the celebration of the first Earth Day, Northland College hosted its first environmental conference. Among those invited to address the two-day conference were Senator Gaylord Nelson and Sigurd Olson. The conference became "the instrument of origin of the Sigurd Olson Environmental Institute," as Robert Matteson, the founder of the institute, wrote. With energy to move in a new and exciting direction, and guided by the philosophies of Sigurd Olson, the institute opened its doors in spring of 1972, embarking on more than 30 years of serving Northland College and the Lake Superior region.

In 1974, Olson earned the John Burroughs Medal, the highest honor in nature writing. He died on January 13, 1982, of a heart attack while snowshoeing near his home. He received a tribute from the US Senate on the 100th anniversary of his birth. David Backes wrote a biography on Olson titled A Wilderness Within – The Life of Sigurd F. Olson which was published in the late 1990s.

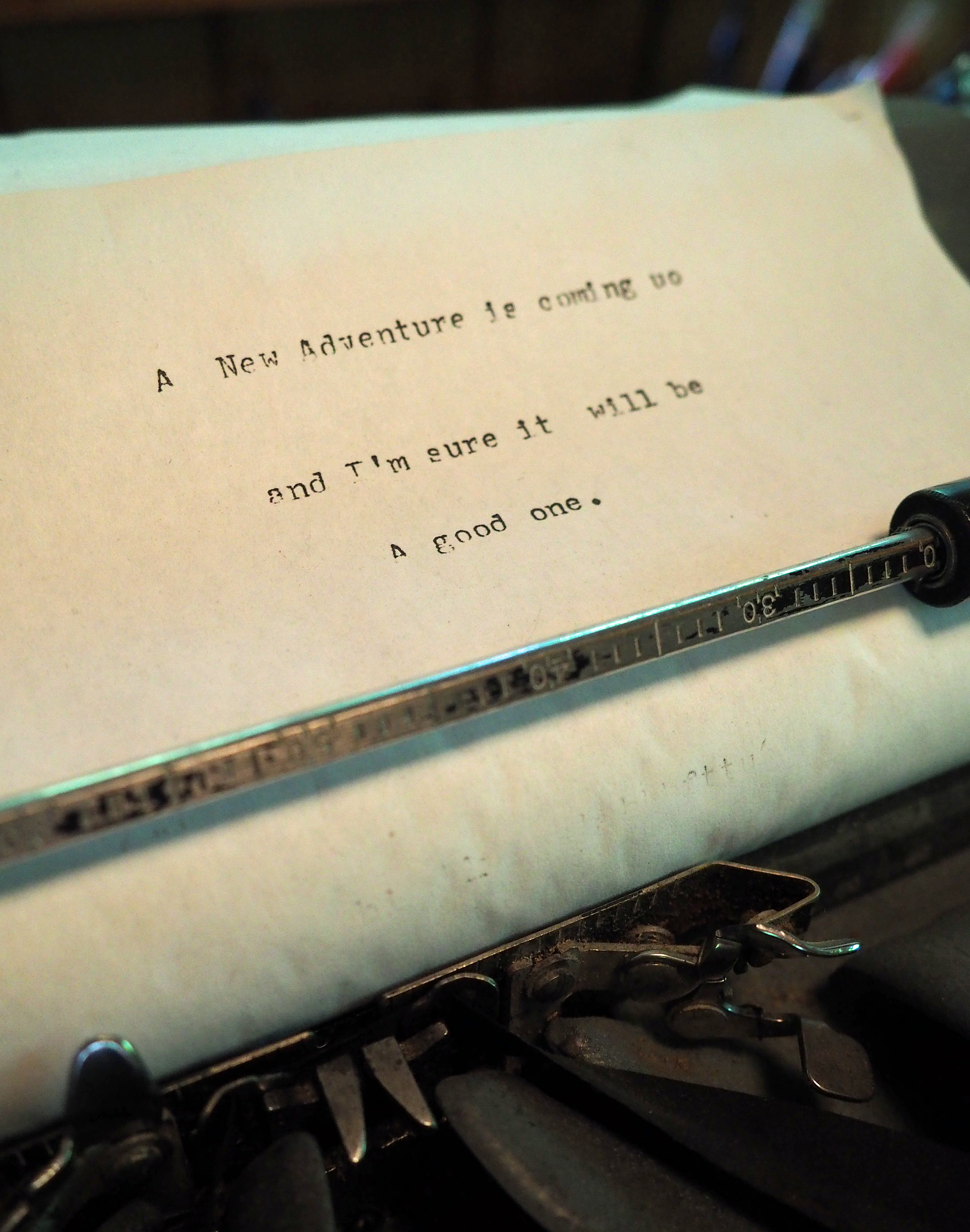
Sigurd F. Olson's last message

In 2014, the Listening Point Foundation acquired Olson's cabin on Burntside Lake. The property included the cabin Olson built near his home where he did his writing, which has since been listed on the National Register of Historic Places. Everything is as he left it at his unexpected death including his photos, decoys, pipes, books, maps, a collection of rocks and other artifacts. The typewriter he used to write all his articles, books, and letters still sits on the desk. The last thing he wrote on it is still on the paper in the typewriter: “A New Adventure is coming up / and I’m sure it will be / A good one."

== Preservation work ==
Olson was influential in the protection of the Boundary Waters and helped draft the Wilderness Act of 1964, becoming vice-president of The Wilderness Society from 1963 to 1967 and president 1968 to 1971. He also helped establish Voyageurs National Park in northern Minnesota, Alaska's Arctic National Wildlife Refuge, and Point Reyes National Seashore in California. Sigurd also was a consultant to the Secretary of the Interior Stewart Udall on wilderness and national park issues.

After over 50 years of hard work, Sigurd reached his goal. Full wilderness status was granted to the Boundary Waters Canoe Area Wilderness by Jimmy Carter in 1978, four years before Sigurd died. His hard work was commemorated in many different ways, including in the naming of a central building of YMCA Camp Widjiwagan, located on nearby Burntside Lake. Olson was president of the National Parks Association and a member of its board of trustees.

== List of works ==
- The Singing Wilderness (1956)
- Listening Point (1958)
- The Lonely Land (1961)
- Runes of the North (1963)
- Open Horizons (1969)
- The Hidden Forest (1969)
- Wilderness Days (1972)
- Reflections From the North Country (1976)
- Of Time and Place (1982)
- Songs of the North. Howard Frank Mosher, ed. (1987)
- The Collected Works of Sigurd F. Olson: The Early Writings, 1921–1934. Mike Link, ed. (1988)
- The Collected Works of Sigurd F. Olson: The College Years, 1935–1944. Mike Link, ed. (1990)
- The Meaning of Wilderness: Essential Articles and Speeches. Edited and with an Introduction by David Backes. (2001)
- Spirit of the North: The Quotable Sigurd F. Olson. Edited and with an Introduction by David Backes. (2004)
