= Curtiss LaQ Day =

American aviator (1895–1972)

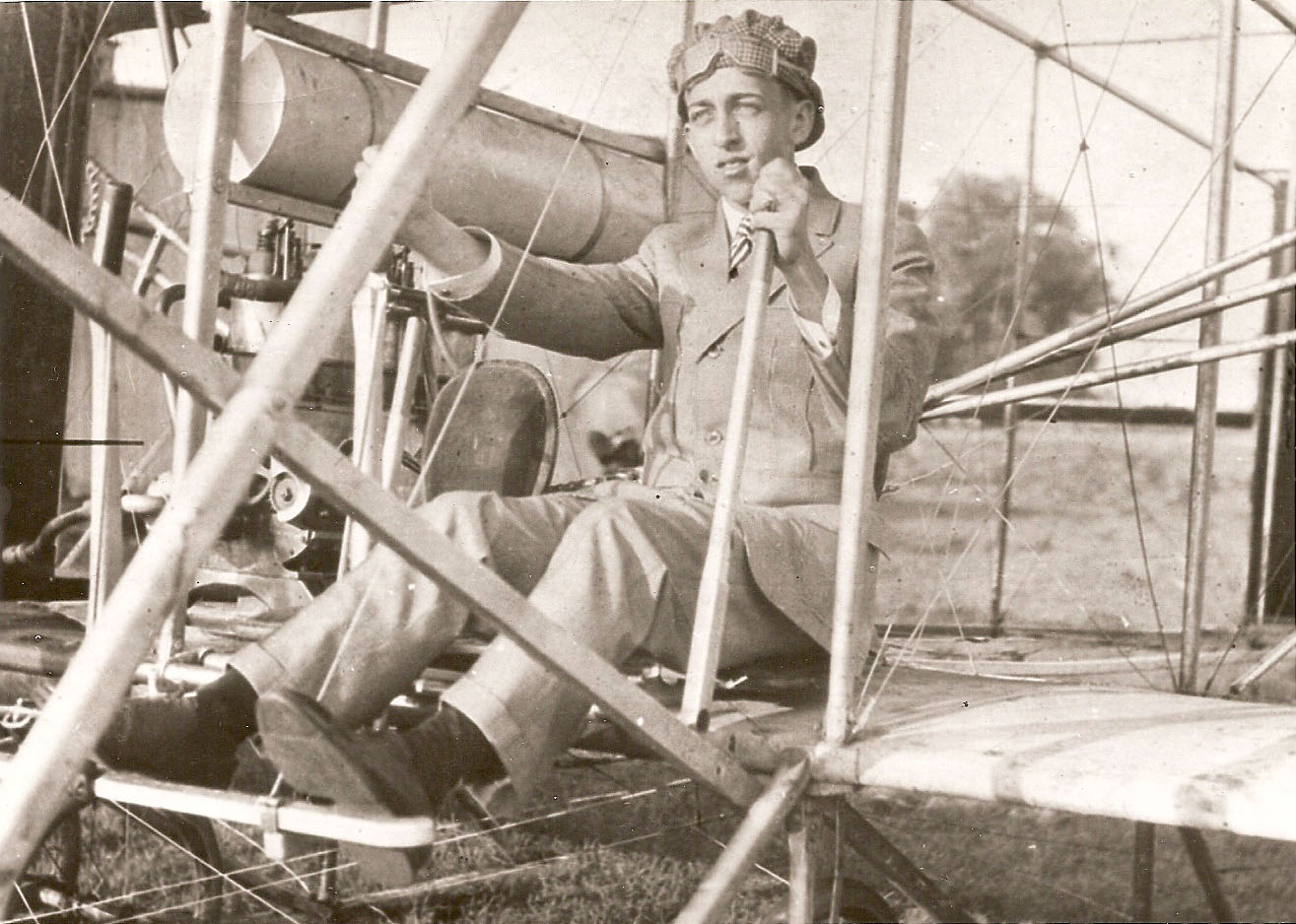
- Day in a biplane, 1914
- Born: Curtiss LaQ Day Jr. May 24, 1895; Paxton, Illinois, US
- Died: April 25, 1972 (aged 76); Elkhart, Indiana, US
- Burial place: Drummer Township Cemetery, Drummer Township, Ford County, Illinois, US; 40.4595339°N 88.3815712°W
- Monuments: Listed on the Wright Memorial in Dayton, Ohio
- Education: University of Illinois (BS)
- Years active: 1910—1925
- Known for: Pioneering the American aviation industry

Curtiss LaQ Day Jr. (May 24, 1895 – April 25, 1972) was an American aviator during the pioneer era. Throughout his teenage and young adult life, Day constructed planes, created a company, flew in exhibitions, taught at prominent aviation schools, and served in the United States military before leaving the field in the mid 1920s. He was once said to be youngest person in the United States to hold a pilot's license from the Aero Club of America.

== Biography ==
=== Early life ===
Day was born in Paxton, Illinois, on May 24, 1895. However, he spent most of his early life in the neighboring town, Gibson City, Illinois. As a young child, when he saw a movie of Wilbur Wright, he sat through both shows and left with the dream of one day becoming an aviator.

Day saw his first actual airplane on September 29, 1910, when Walter Brookins flew a Wright B over Gibson City in his historic flight from Chicago to Springfield, Illinois. Highly motivated after the event, Day constructed a biplane glider the following winter. He flew the plane solo (with assistance from his classmates) on March 17, 1911. Two days later, after removing its tail for experimental purposes, he wrecked the glider when he took off from a railway embankment. His mother grounded him and his family set to block him from having a future in aviation.

=== Aviation career ===
After graduating from Drummer High School in 1913, he was gifted a trip to visit relatives in New York City. Before leaving, he secretly withdrew the money in his savings account, intending to learn to fly without his family's knowledge. He chose to attend the Thomas Brothers Flying School in Bath, New York, as they charged only $250 (equivalent to $7,954 in 2024) and did not include fees for repairing breakage. He left New York City for Bath and began training on a single-seater Thomas pusher. Frank Herbert Burnside was his instructor. He made more advanced flights soon after with Walter Ellsworth Johnson in a Thomas Flying Boat at Conesus Lake. Day's family contacted the school to notify them that he was a minor and flying without their consent. Grounded again, he was forced home. He agreed with his parents to attend the University of Illinois Urbana-Champaign in the fall of 1913 if he could continue flying the following summer.

In June 1914, Day entered the Wright Brothers School at Simms Station in Dayton, Ohio, where he was instructed by Howard Max Rinehart. There, he flew solo in a Wright Model B and was awarded the FIA Pilot License, No. 302 after flying for his tests on July 22, 1914. Immediately, he was employed at Hensil Aero Stabilizer Company at Cicero Field, Chicago, Illinois, as a test pilot. He worked for the company until returning to school in the fall.

In April 1915, Day received an offer of $300 (equivalent to $9,544 in 2024) per week from Pancho Villa to fly over Mexico, scouting for his military forces. Day refused the offer, choosing instead to earn money from public exhibitions without the added danger of military operations. He returned to Cicero Field in June, backed by businessmen who helped him form the LaQ Aeroplane Company. His company purchased planes specifically designed for exhibition work from the Benoist Aircraft Company. Day employed P. G. B. "Bud" Morriss as his booking agent. Morriss had him pose in short pants and advertised him as "Satan Day — The Boy Aviator." Day made a number of flights at and around Cicero Field that summer. Notable flights include a Fourth of July exhibition in Anna, Illinois, where he crashed due to a faulty propeller, and the two-day exhibition in Gibson City, where he flew with his colleague Frank Kastory in a PLV two-seater biplane.

In June 1916, he became an assistant instructor at the Wright Flying School in Hempstead Plains, New York. He was previously employed as a test pilot at its Hempstead Field plant.

=== Service in the United States military ===
After receiving a Bachelor of Science in commerce and banking from the University of Illinois in June 1917, Day became a civilian instructor at Chanute Field flying "Jennies". Later that fall, he instructed at Scott Field. He joined the United States Air Force and received his RMA wings in 1918. Day also received his Expert License, No. 187 on August 14, 1918.

During World War I, he served as an instructor in advanced flight at the Aviation Section, U.S. Signal Corps. Day went to Morocco in 1925 to fight in the Riff War as a member of the Escadrille Cherifienne. During World War II, he worked for Eastern Air Lines in the operations department at LaGuardia Field in New York and at Savannah, Georgia.

=== Post aviation and death ===
He quit flying after the war and worked in the hotel business. Day died on April 25, 1972, in Elkhart, Indiana. He is buried in the Drummer Township Cemetery. Both of his parents outlived him, his father dying in 1974 at 105 and his mother dying in 1973 at 98.
