= Dead River (Burntside River tributary) =

Coordinates: 47.9524035°N 91.9487533°W

Location
- Country: United States

Physical characteristics
- Source
  - location: Minnesota

The Dead River is a river of Minnesota. The river flows through the north–central part of Morse Township in northern Saint Louis County, and is a tributary of the Burntside River via Burntside Lake.

== See also ==
- List of rivers of Minnesota
