= Paxton, Illinois =

- City
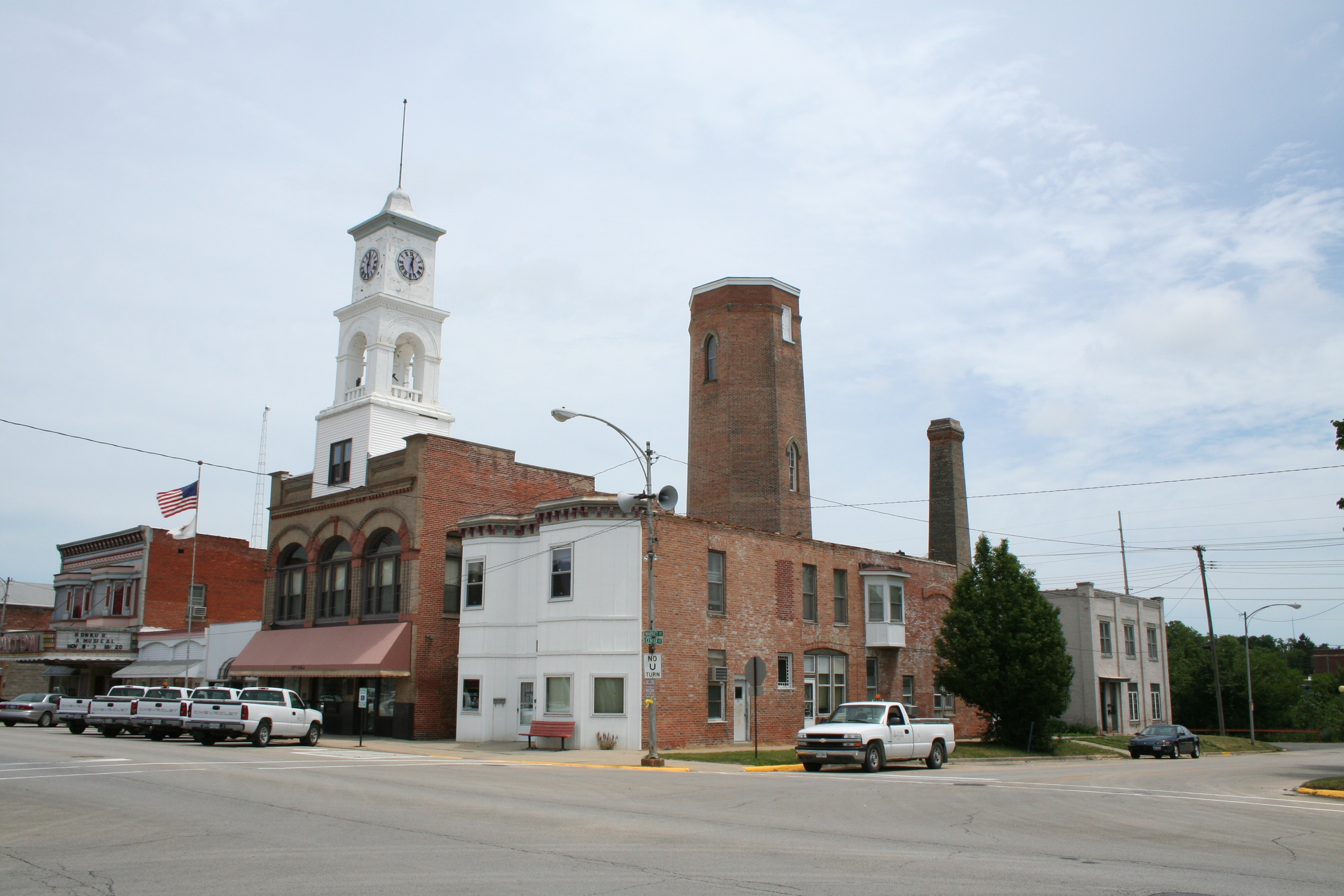
- View of Downtown Paxton
- Interactive map of Paxton, Illinois
- Location within Illinois Location within the United States
- Coordinates: 40°27′15″N 88°06′45″W
- Country: United States
- State: Illinois
- County: Ford
- Named for: Joseph Paxton

Area
  - Total: 3.04 sq mi (7.88 km^{2})
  - Land: 3.03 sq mi (7.86 km^{2})
  - Water: 0.0077 sq mi (0.02 km^{2})
- Elevation: 784 ft (239 m)

Population (2020)
  - Total: 4,450
  - Density: 1,465.9/sq mi (565.98/km^{2})
- Time zone: UTC-6 (CST)
  - Summer (DST): UTC-5 (CDT)
- ZIP Code(s): 60957
- Area code: 217
- FIPS code: 17-58239
- GNIS feature ID: 2396167
- Website: www.cityofpaxton.com

Paxton is a city in and the county seat of Ford County, Illinois, United States. The population was 4,450 at the 2020 census.

== History ==
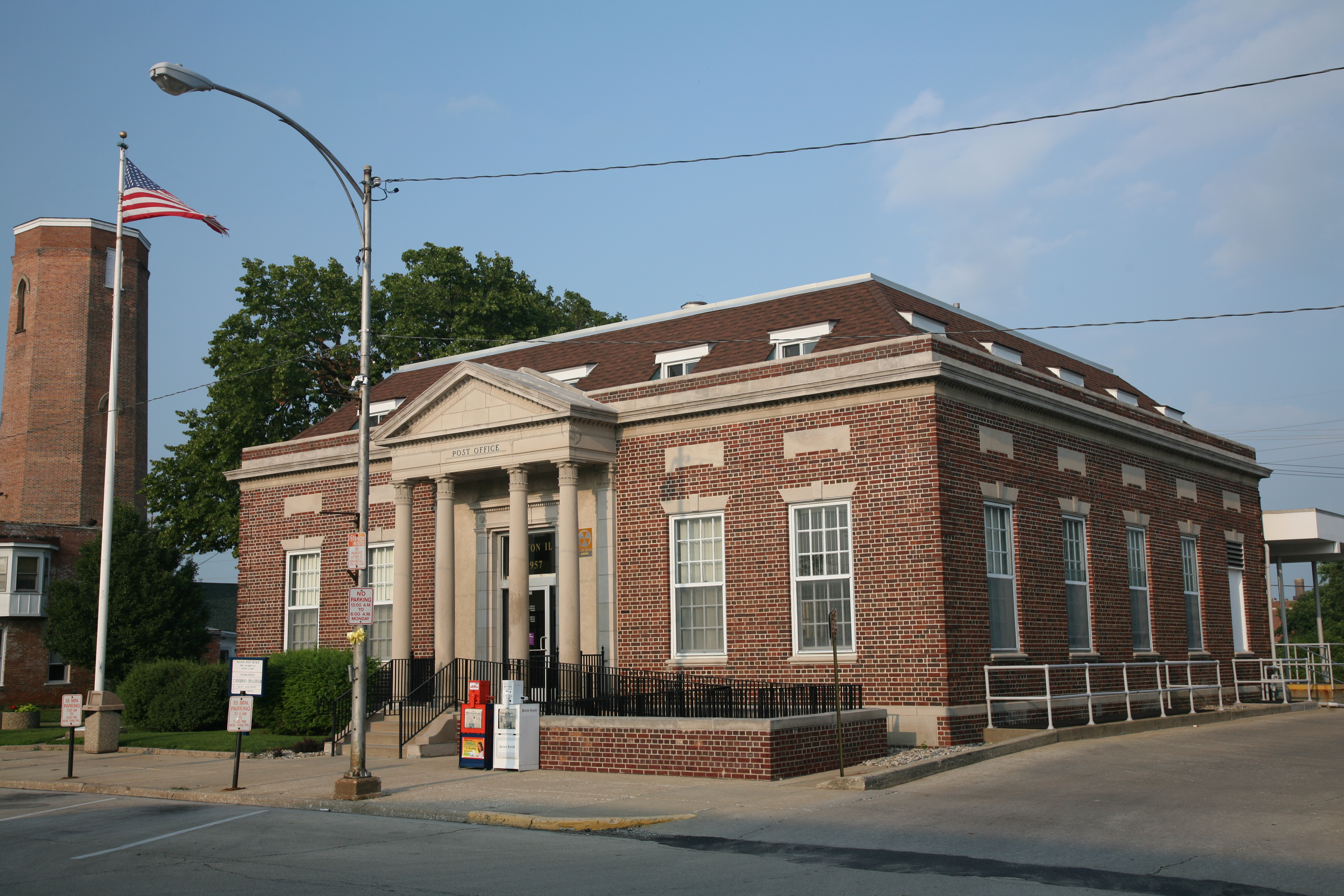
Paxton, Illinois post office.

Paxton was laid out in 1857 as Prospect City along the Illinois Central Railroad for Leander Britt, Ransome R. Murdock and William H. Pells. This was in what was at the time Prairie City Township, Vermilion County, Illinois. However, as Dr. Wilbur W. Sauer wrote, that residents noted the town was "all prospect and no city." In 1859 Ford County, Illinois was created, and later that year Prospect City was renamed for Sir Joseph Paxton, architect of the Crystal Palace. Mr. Paxton was a major shareholder in the Illinois Central Railroad, which in 1856 was the longest span of railroad in the world (Chicago to Cairo). It was rumored that Paxton was interested in organizing an English settlement in Illinois. The colony never materialized, but the town kept the name. Founded in 1859, Paxton celebrated its sesquicentennial in 2009.

Augustana College was located in Paxton from 1863 to 1875, aided by a community effort led by recent Swedish immigrants to fund educational and cultural opportunities for citizens.

An early public high school was established in 1872; it served the surrounding area for the next several decades, culminating in the formation of a community high school district in May 1920. The local school's mascot was the Paxton Mustangs until consolidation with the Buckley-Loda Rockets district in 1990 formed the current Paxton-Buckley-Loda School District, known as the PBL Panthers. The school is a member of the IESA and IHSA for interscholastic sports and activities.

The Ford County Courthouse in Paxton was built in 1906, and boasts many murals painted by the Works Progress Administration during the 1930s.

On June 22, 1919, former President William Howard Taft visited Paxton while on his way to Champaign. After disembarking from a long train ride, Taft delivered a speech in the Pells Park Pavilion in favor of U.S. entry into the newly formed League of Nations. Taft's appearance is a testament to the Paxton Chautauqua, which was held in Pells Park from 1905 to 1930, attracting musicians, speakers and entertainment from all over the United States.

From 1865 to 2007, the Paxton Daily Record was published in Paxton, making the paper one of the longest-running daily newspapers of its size in the state of Illinois. Today, the Ford County Chronicle, a digital publication managed by the former paper's staff, continues to publish local news, sports and other event information.

Due to Paxton having the highest elevation points in the area, the Illinois Central Railroad dug out ground so that the railroad could move at the same elevation, but below the level of the city of Paxton. When the railroad was cut (around the 1920s), several bridges were built across the railroad to connect the east and west sides of Paxton. Presently, there are three vehicular bridges, which are located at Holmes Street, Pells Street and Patton Street, and a pedestrian bridge at Orleans Street.

The town also hosts the Historic Brick Water Tower & Ford County Historical Society Museum, which opened on July 4, 2007. The 80-foot (24 m) tall brick water tower was built in 1887 and is listed on the National Register of Historic Places. The Paxton Foundation, a local historical preservation group, is currently(when?) restoring the Old Ford County Jail and Sheriff's Residence, built in 1871. Located on West State Street adjacent to the Courthouse, it will be turned into a museum. Another local building on the National Register of Historic Places is the Paxton Carnegie Library, which was built in 1903.

The community has many homes built in the late 19th century, some of which are now part of an historic homes walking tour. Many of the home owners have won awards from various preservation and restoration societies for their efforts in maintaining the architectural heritage of these important landmarks. The Paxton Area Chamber of Commerce and PRIDE in Paxton, a member of the Illinois Main Street Program, promote local businesses and events in the historic downtown district.

== Geography ==
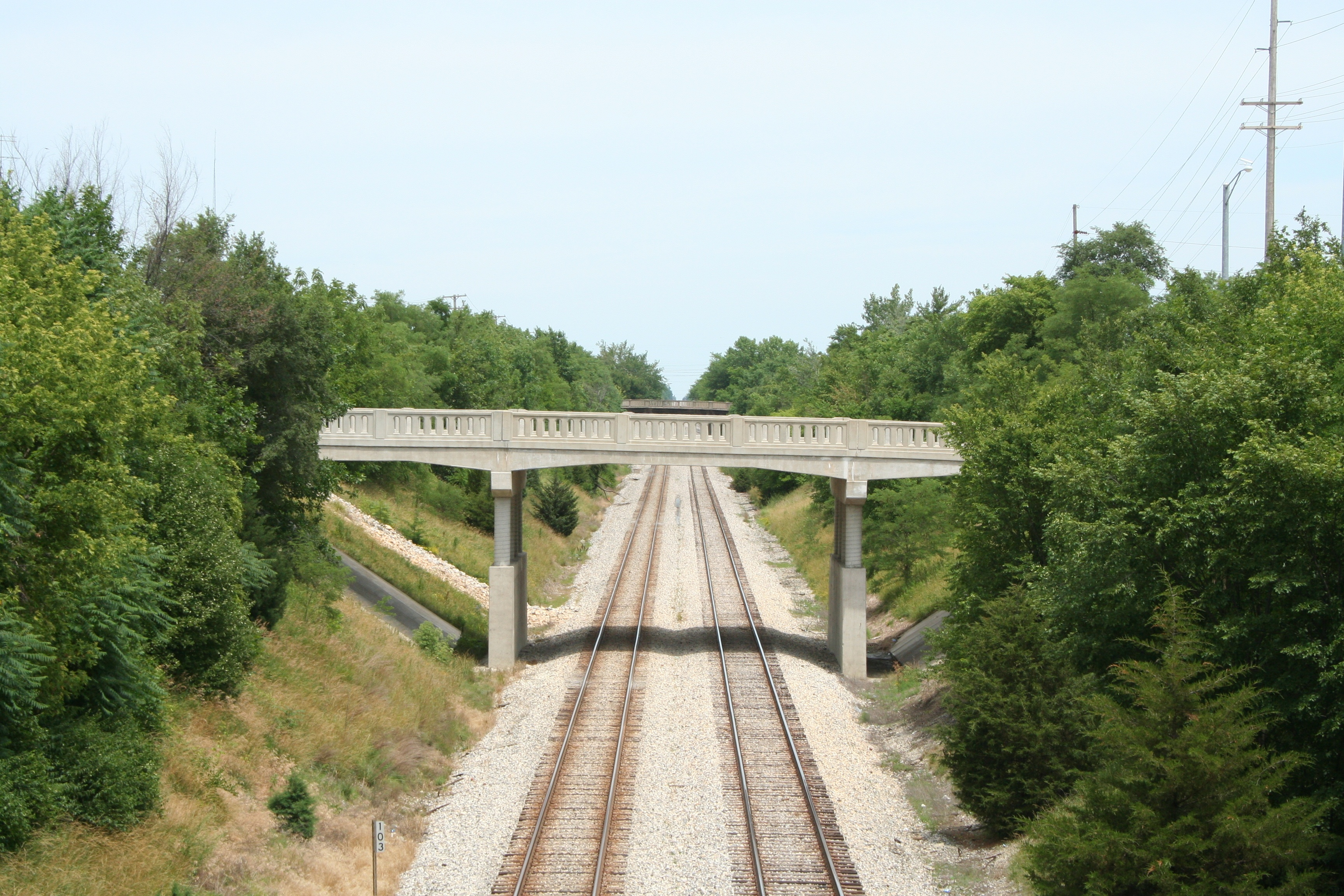
Paxton has several bridges over the Canadian National (Illinois Central) mainline.

According to the 2021 census gazetteer files, Paxton has a total area of 3.04 square miles (7.87 km^{2}), of which 3.04 square miles (7.87 km^{2}) (or 99.77%) is land and 0.01 square miles (0.03 km^{2}) (or 0.23%) is water.

Paxton is directly served by three major highways (I-57, U.S. Route 45, and Illinois Route 9), the Illinois Central Railroad, and a municipal airport with a 3,500 feet (1,100 m) landing strip.

== Demographics ==
Historical population
Census	Pop.	Note	%±
1860	275		—
1870	1,456		429.5%
1880	1,725		18.5%
1890	2,187		26.8%
1900	3,036		38.8%
1910	2,912		−4.1%
1920	3,033		4.2%
1930	2,892		−4.6%
1940	3,106		7.4%
1950	3,795		22.2%
1960	4,370		15.2%
1970	4,373		0.1%
1980	4,258		−2.6%
1990	4,289		0.7%
2000	4,525		5.5%
2010	4,473		−1.1%
2020	4,450		−0.5%
U.S. Decennial Census

=== 2020 census ===
As of the 2020 census, Paxton had a population of 4,450, 1,794 households, and 1,075 families. The population density was 1,462.37 inhabitants per square mile (564.62/km^{2}), and there were 1,999 housing units at an average density of 656.92 per square mile (253.64/km^{2}). The median age was 40.2 years. 23.6% of residents were under the age of 18 and 19.0% were 65 years of age or older. For every 100 females there were 93.7 males, and for every 100 females age 18 and over there were 91.0 males age 18 and over.

98.9% of residents lived in urban areas, while 1.1% lived in rural areas.

Of the city's 1,794 households, 31.7% had children under the age of 18 living in them. Of all households, 45.3% were married-couple households, 18.5% were households with a male householder and no spouse or partner present, and 28.2% were households with a female householder and no spouse or partner present. About 32.2% of all households were made up of individuals, and 14.4% had someone living alone who was 65 years of age or older. The average household size was 2.99 and the average family size was 2.34.

Of all housing units, 10.3% were vacant. The homeowner vacancy rate was 4.3% and the rental vacancy rate was 9.9%.

Racial composition as of the 2020 census
Race	Number	Percent
White	4,012	90.2%
Black or African American	37	0.8%
American Indian and Alaska Native	14	0.3%
Asian	14	0.3%
Native Hawaiian and Other Pacific Islander	0	0.0%
Some other race	78	1.8%
Two or more races	295	6.6%
Hispanic or Latino (of any race)	226	5.1%

=== Income and poverty ===
The median income for a household in the city was $51,716, and the median income for a family was $71,359. Males had a median income of $47,169 versus $28,233 for females. The per capita income for the city was $26,734. About 8.4% of families and 11.5% of the population were below the poverty line, including 21.5% of those under age 18 and 1.9% of those age 65 or over.

== Notable people ==
- Charles Bogardus (1841–1929), lived in Paxton; Illinois state legislator. businessman, and farmer
- Curtiss LaQ Day (1895–1972), born and raised in Paxton; an early pioneer of aviation.
- Antoinette Downing (1904–2001), historical preservationist born in Paxton
- Gustaf Johnson (1872–1944), mayor of Paxton and member of the Illinois House of Representatives
- Pete Larson (born 1944), running back for the Washington Redskins
- Lena Morrow Lewis (1868–1950), political activist, orator, and journalist
- Mush March (1908–2002), player for 1934 and 1938 Stanley Cup champion Chicago Blackhawks
- Tom Meents (born 1967), champion monster truck driver; lives in Paxton.
- Sid Mercer (1880–1945), sportswriter who covered boxing and baseball
- Gina Miles (born 2003) singer, winner of The Voice.
- George E. Morrow (1840–1900), agronomist
- William H. Plackett (1937–2016), Master Chief Petty Officer of the U.S. Navy.
