= Jonas Reiter =

German politician (born 1996)

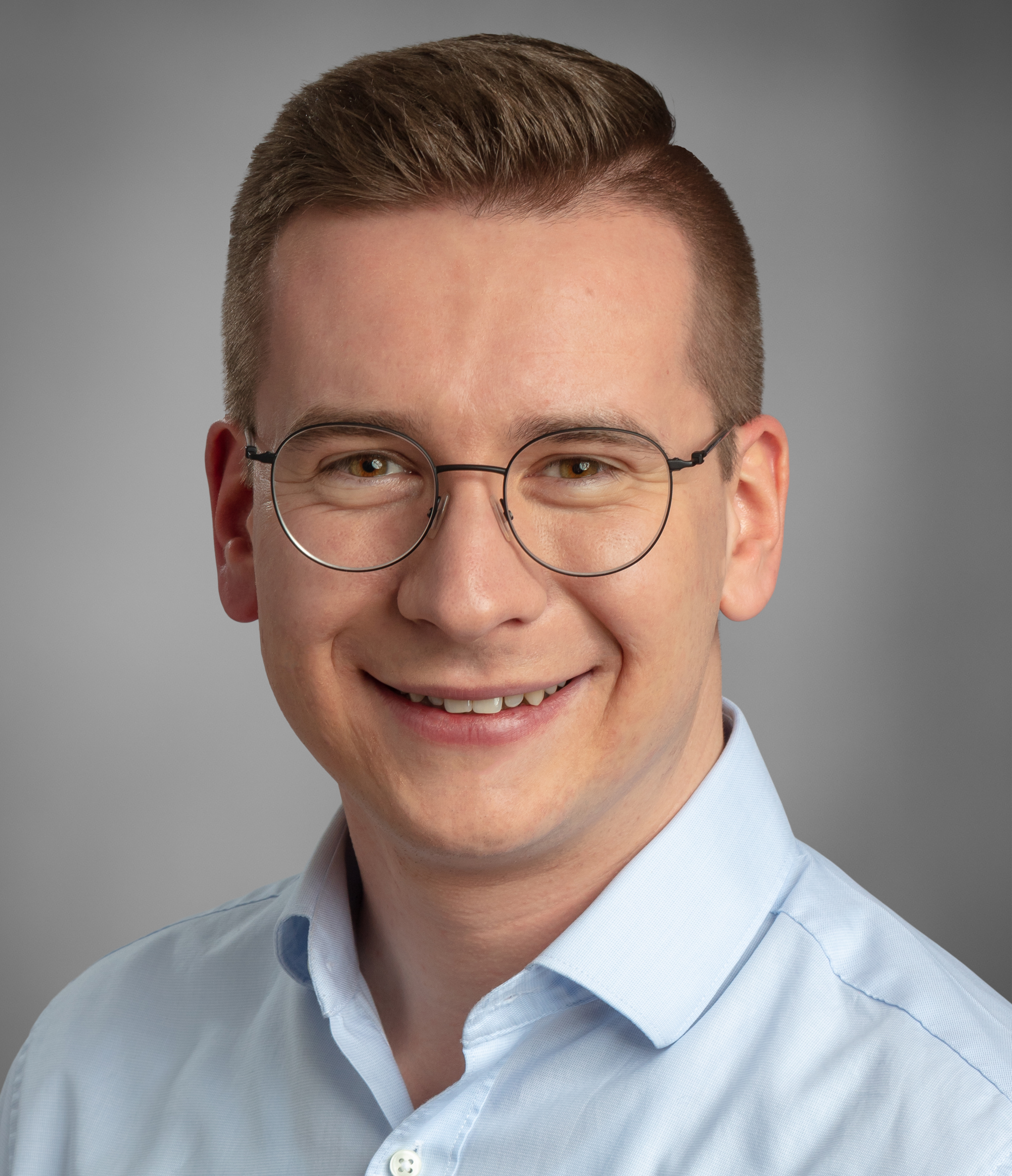
- Reiter in 2023

Member of the Landtag of Saarland
- In office 1 July 2022 – 30 September 2026
- Preceded by: Alexander Funk
- Succeeded by: Nadine Backes

Personal details
- Born: 12 February 1996 (age 30)
- Party: Christian Democratic Union

Jonas Reiter (born 12 February 1996) is a German politician serving as a member of the Landtag of Saarland since 2022. He has served as mayor of Primstal since 2024.
