= Paxton Airport =

Public Airport in Paxton, Illinois

Coordinates: 40°26′56″N 88°7′40″W

- IATA: none; ICAO: none; FAA LID: 1C1

Summary
- Serves: Paxton, Illinois
- Time zone: UTC−06:00 (-6)
  - Summer (DST): UTC−05:00 (-5)
- Elevation AMSL: 779 ft / 237 m
- Interactive map of Paxton Airport

Runways
Direction	Length		Surface
Direction	ft	m	Surface
18/36	3,409	1,039	Asphalt

Statistics (2022)
- Aircraft Movements: 4,000

Paxton Airport (FAA LID: 1C1) is a public use airport located 2 miles southwest of Paxton, Illinois, United States. The is airport owned by the 1C1 LLC. (Source Ford Co. Tax records 2024 tax year)

The airport has one runway, 18/36, which is 3,409 x 50 ft (1,039 x 15 m) and is paved with asphalt. The fixed-base operator on the airport offering 24/7 credit card pumps serving 100LL and Jet A.

For the 12-month period ending July 31, 2022, the airport had 77 aircraft operations per week, or about 4,000 per year. This includes 95% general aviation and 5% air taxi. For the same time period, there were 17 aircraft based on the field: 11 single-engine airplanes and six ultralights.

The airport hosts regular events, including fly-ins sponsored by local chapters of the Experimental Aircraft Association. Efforts were made to revitalize the airport by bringing in pilots and non-pilots alike.

The airport is a significant hub for agricultural aviation, and most of its traffic is from air tractors. Along with nearby Tuscola Airport, Paxton has seen significant improvements, such as funding for the paving of its runway, in support of the aerial application business since 2020.

== See also ==
- List of airports in Illinois
