= Robinson, Minnesota =

Robinson
- Unincorporated community
- Location within Minnesota Location within the United States
- Coordinates: 47°51′34″N 92°02′31″W
- Country: United States
- State: Minnesota
- County: Saint Louis
- Township: Morse Township
- Elevation: 1,480 ft (450 m)

Population
  - Total: 20
- Time zone: UTC-6 (Central (CST))
  - Summer (DST): UTC-5 (CDT)
- ZIP code: 55731
- Area code: 218
- GNIS feature ID: 662283

Robinson is an unincorporated community in Morse Township, Saint Louis County, Minnesota, United States.

== Geography ==
The community is located between Tower and Ely on State Highways 1 (MN 1) and 169 (MN 169). The boundary line between Eagles Nest Township and Morse Township is nearby. Bear Head Lake State Park is also in the vicinity.

== History ==
The community bears the name of an early lumberman who worked in the area.
