= Burntside, Minnesota =

Burntside
- Unincorporated community
- Location within Minnesota Location within the United States
- Coordinates: 47°53′40″N 91°55′44″W
- Country: United States
- State: Minnesota
- County: Saint Louis
- Township: Morse Township
- Elevation: 1,391 ft (424 m)
- Time zone: UTC-6 (Central (CST))
  - Summer (DST): UTC-5 (CDT)
- ZIP code: 55731
- Area code: 218
- GNIS feature ID: 660917

Burntside is an unincorporated community in Morse Township, Saint Louis County, Minnesota, United States.

The community is located three miles west of Ely, near the junction of State Highway 169 (MN 169) / State Highway 1 (MN 1), and Saint Louis County Road 88 (Grant–McMahan Boulevard).

Burntside Lake and Shagawa Lake are in the vicinity.
