= Gustaf Johnson =

Swedish-American politician (1872–1944)

Gustaf J. Johnson
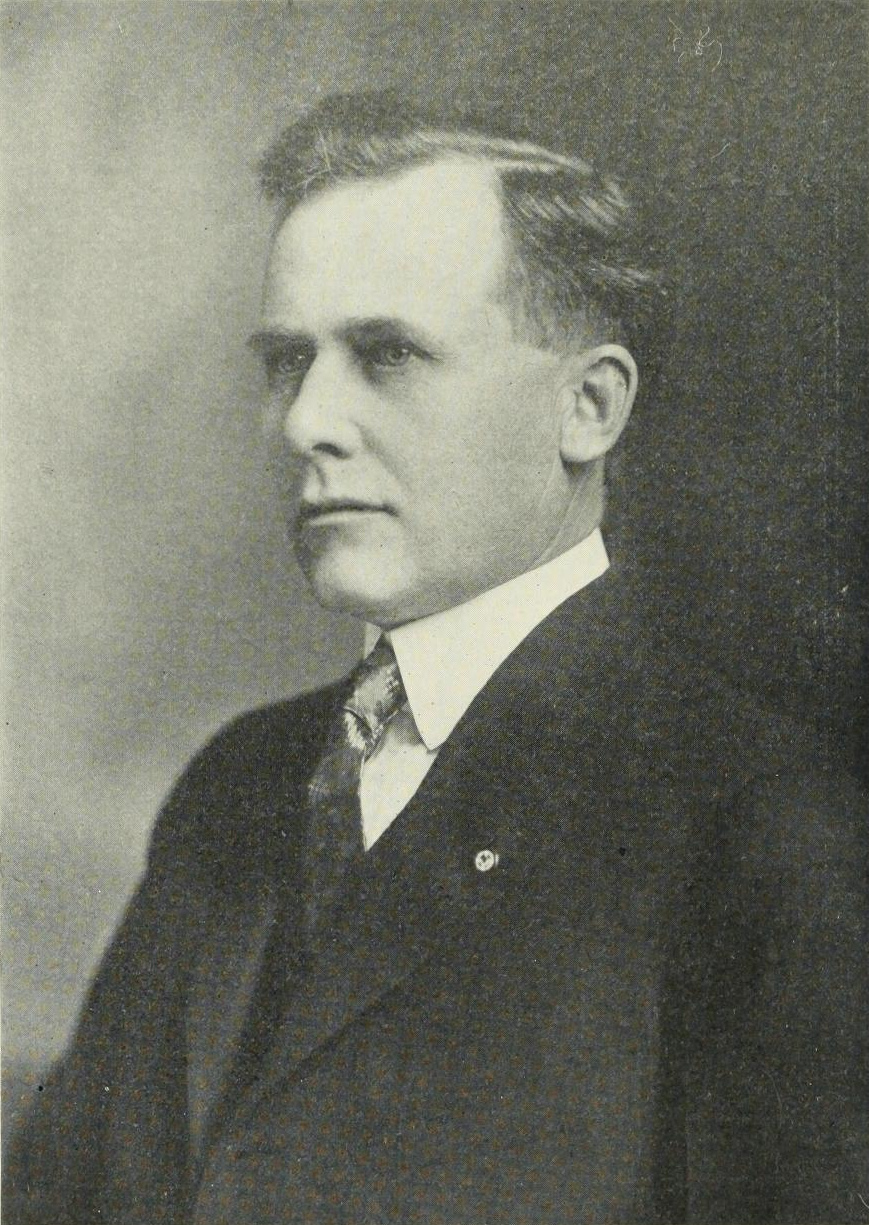

Mayor of Paxton, Illinois
- In office 1909–1915

Member of the Illinois House of Representatives
- In office 1920–1936

Personal details
- Born: September 8, 1872
- Died: August 12, 1944 (aged 71) Urbana, Illinois
- Spouse: Jennie Frederickson
- Children: 5

Gustaf J. Johnson (September 8, 1872 – August 12, 1944) was an immigrant to the United States from Sweden who became a mayor of Paxton, Illinois and a state legislator for 16 years from 1920 to 1936.

== Biography ==
Johnson was born September 8, 1872, in Sweden moving to the United States at the age of fourteen. He first lived in Clay Center, Kansas where he was educated in public schools before moving to Chicago to attend business college. He then moved to Paxton, Illinois in 1895 where he ran a watch making and repair shop. He later set up a jewelry store in 1905 which he ran until 1910, the store was located within the Middlecoff hotel.

Johnson held the position of president at the Paxton Building and Loan association for twenty-five years. He was manager of the Central Telephone & Telegraph Co. whist mayor of Paxton resigning January 1913 and replaced by T. D. Thompson.

He married Jennie Frederickson in 1898, with whom he had several children. His wife died before him in 1931 after being critically ill for weeks.

He was a member of several organizations including the Odd Fellows, the Paxton Masonic Lodge, the Scottish Rite order of Masons and the Modern Woodmen.

== Politics ==
In 1907 he was elected to be city alderman serving two years before being elected mayor of Paxton, a position he held for three terms. He had first been elected mayor in April 1909 on the Citizens ticket defeating the People's nominee Arthur Dillon. He was then re-elected in April 1911 again defeating Arthur Dillon with 360 votes to 118. After his second re-election Johnson in April 1913 wrote in the Paxton Record how honored he was to be the first mayor of Paxton to be elected for three consecutive sessions. He stood for a forth term but was defeated by W. H. Westbrook mostly due to the women's vote. As mayor he was noted for getting most of the city's streets paved and also for the expansion of Pell park.

In 1920 he was elected to the Illinois General Assembly and served as a Republican for 16 years in the Illinois House of Representatives from 1920 to 1936.

In 1926 Johnson was elected chairman of the state Republican central committee succeeding Frank L. Smith.

He was the chairman of the Ford County Republican for 16 years.

== Death ==
He died from heart disease August 12, 1944 at the Carle Memorial hospital in Urbana, Illinois and was buried at the Glen cemetery. He was survived by five children, three sons and two daughters, as well as two brothers Knudt Johnson and Henning Johnson.
