= Burntside Lodge =

Resort in northern Minnesota

- Burntside Lodge Historic District
- U.S. National Register of Historic Places
- U.S. Historic district
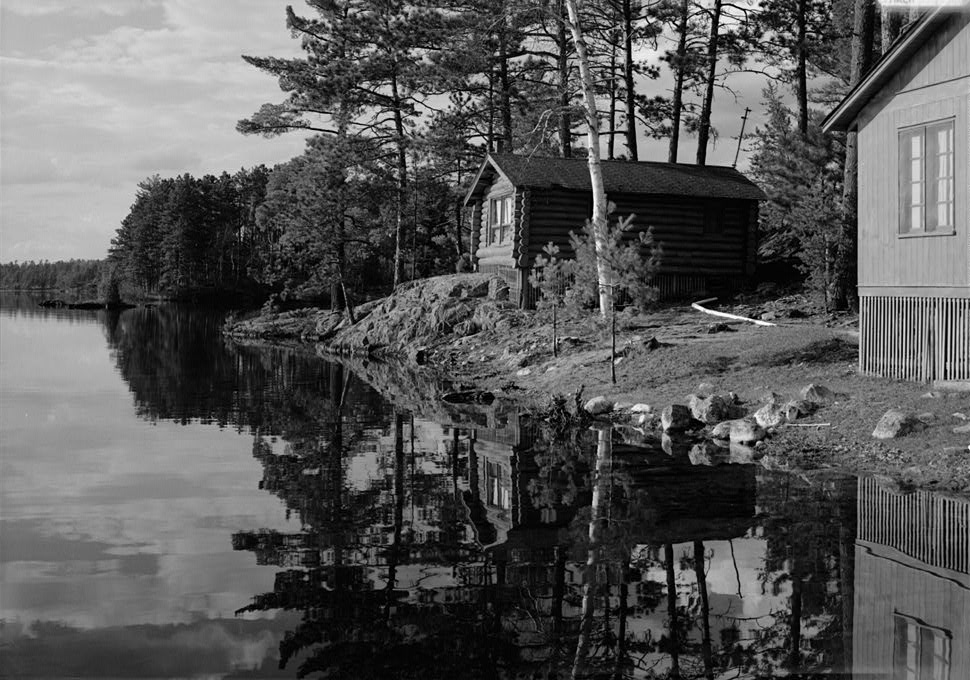
- Two lakeshore cabins at Burntside Lodge

- Location within Minnesota Location within the United States
- Location: 2755 Burntside Lodge Road, Morse Township, Minnesota
- Nearest city: Ely, Minnesota
- Coordinates: 47°55′28″N 91°57′8″W
- Area: 8 acres (3.2 ha)
- Built: 1914–1937
- Architect: Meitunen & Peterson
- Architectural style: Rustic
- NRHP reference No.: 88000896
- Added to NRHP: June 23, 1988

Burntside Lodge is a resort on the southern shore of Burntside Lake in Morse Township, Minnesota, United States, outside the city of Ely. It has been in operation for over a century.

== Founding ==
Burntside Lodge was originally known as the Brownell Outing Company and was established as a hunting camp in the early twentieth century, during which part of the main lodge was built. In about 1913, two brothers, William A. and Lyman Alden, purchased the property and created Burntside Lodge.

== Since 1941 ==
The resort was purchased from the Aldens in 1941 by Ray and Nancy LaMontagne, who actively owned and managed the historic resort for 42 years. 84–85 years later it continues in the LaMontagne family. As of 2019, Burntside Lodge is operated by Ray and Nancy's son Lou, his wife Lonnie, and their adult children Nicole and Jacques.

== National Register of Historic Places ==
Burntside Lodge was listed as a historic district on the National Register of Historic Places in 1988 for its local significance in the themes of architecture and entertainment/recreation. It was nominated for being northern St. Louis County's first full-scale commercial resort and its finest collection of log resort buildings.

== Description ==
The resort consists of 23 cabins. The cabins at Burntside Lodge vary in design, size, and location. Many were constructed during the 1920s of native timbers, and all have wood floors and knotty pine interiors. The lodge's National Register nomination says of them: "Built of local materials by local craftsmen, these buildings are a remarkable architectural achievement in an outstanding state of preservation".

== See also ==
- National Register of Historic Places listings in St. Louis County, Minnesota
