= Burnsides, West Virginia =

Unincorporated community in West Virginia, United States

- Unincorporated community
- Location within West Virginia Location within the United States
- Coordinates: 38°06′30″N 80°12′30″W
- Country: United States
- State: West Virginia
- County: Pocahontas
- Elevation: 2,014 ft (614 m)
- Time zone: UTC-5 (Eastern (EST))
  - Summer (DST): UTC-4 (EDT)
- Area codes: 304 & 681
- GNIS feature ID: 1550566

Burnsides is an unincorporated community in Pocahontas County, West Virginia, United States. Burnsides is located on the Greenbrier River, 2 miles (3.2 km) south of Hillsboro.
