= Burnside of Duntrune =

Coordinates: 56.501913°N 2.912940°W

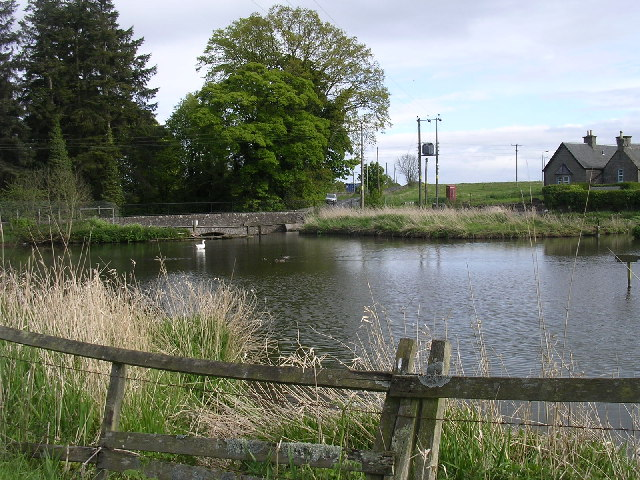
- Burnside of Duntrune village pond

- Location within Angus Location near the Dundee City council area
- OS grid reference: NO439348
- Council area: Angus
- Lieutenancy area: Angus
- Country: Scotland
- Sovereign state: United Kingdom
- Post town: DUNDEE
- Postcode district: DD5
- Dialling code: 01382
- Police: Scotland
- Fire: Scottish
- Ambulance: Scottish
- UK Parliament: Dundee East
- Scottish Parliament: Angus South

Burnside of Duntrune is a hamlet in Angus, Scotland. It is situated 1 km North of Ballumbie on the outskirts of Dundee, on the Fithie Burn.
