= Burnside Triangle =

Human settlement in Portland, Oregon, U.S.

Coordinates: 45.5218°N 122.6819°W

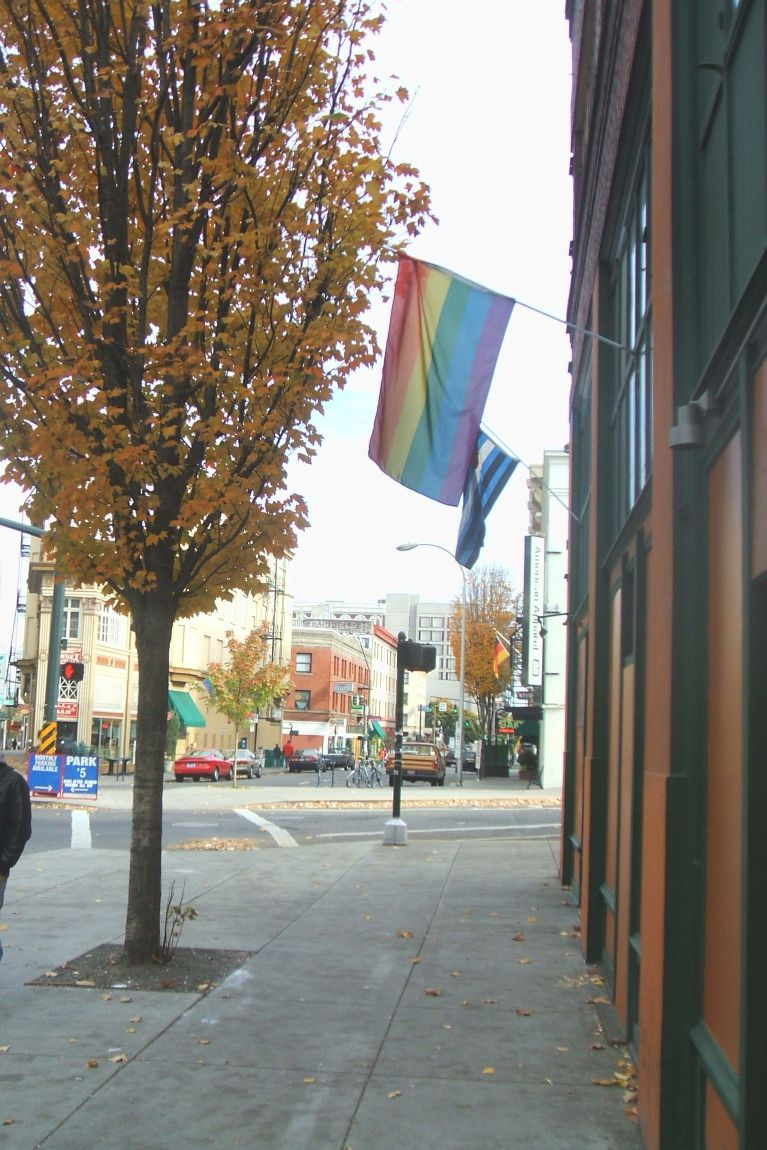
Rainbow flag displayed in the Burnside Triangle, near the intersection of West Burnside Street, Southwest 13th Avenue, and Southwest Stark Street

The Burnside Triangle, also known as the Pink Triangle (Note: After the pink triangle, an LGBTQ symbol adapted from the Nazi concentration camp badge that was used to identify those the Nazis perceived as gay men.) or Vaseline Alley, was a triangular district and LGBTQ enclave in Portland, Oregon, United States, known for its relatively high density of LGBTQ and gay-friendly businesses.

== Description and history ==
The Burnside Triangle was centered on Southwest Stark Street, now signed as Southwest Harvey Milk Street, and comprises a triangular set of city blocks that anchors the north end. It has historically acted as a welcoming space to the district, drawing visitors throughout the region to many different meeting spots, including bars and nightclubs.

The gay liberation, lesbian feminism, and the sexual revolution of the 1960s and 1970s helped bring attention to the problems faced by the people in the LGBTQ community. Before this period, they had no civil rights or protections in employment, housing, or public accommodations. In addition, gay, bisexual, and transgender people did not have advocacy programs in their community; therefore, they constituted a largely invisible population. The Burnside Triangle helped those in the LGBTQ community feel less invisible by providing bars and clubs as social gathering spaces.

The Burnside Triangle housed a combination of gay-friendly businesses such as independent shops, restaurants, housing, and social services. The Burnside Triangle was also known for their gay bars and dance clubs, including Boxxes (now closed), CC Slaughters, the Eagle, Red Cap Garage (now closed), Panorama, Scandals, Silverado, and Three Sisters (now closed). The gay bathhouse Club Portland was also located in the Burnside Triangle. In 2007, in an article about Portland's appeal to "queer travelers" (particularly lesbians), The Advocate noted that men dominate the bars and nightclubs along Stark Street and the Burnside Triangle. In 2008, Willamette Week said the Downtown Portland district "underwent a complete renaissance and is now thoroughly established as an LGBTQ enclave stretching over several energetic city blocks. The influence of Burnside spreads into nearby neighborhoods including the Pearl District (a former industrial section of old Portland that now booms with art and commerce) and the rather upscale and upbeat Northwest neighborhood."

In 2017, the Oregonian noted, "The Pink Triangle isn't very pink anymore. In the last decade, gentrification of downtown's west end has changed the nature of Southwest Stark Street, bringing with it higher rents and new development." In 2025, when Scandals announced they were moving out of their historic location in the Burnside Triangle, owner David Fones said, "Instead of a Pink Triangle, we're a Pink Dot in what used to be definitely a thriving gay community."

The history of the Burnside Triangle was recognized in 2024 when the Crystal Hotel building, which is located within the Triangle, was listed on the National Register of Historic Places.
