= Bakeš =

Bakeš (feminine: Bakešová) is a Czech surname. Notable people with the surname include:

- David Bakeš (born 1982), Czech snowboarder
- Lucie Bakešová (1853–1935), Czech folklorist and social activist
- Milan Bakeš (born 1963), Czech sport shooter
