= Nadine Backes =

German politician (born 1985)

Member of the Landtag of Saarland
- Incumbent
- Assumed office 1 October 2026
- Preceded by: Jonas Reiter
- Constituency: Neunkirchen

Personal details
- Born: 1985 (age 40–41)
- Party: Christian Democratic Union

Nadine Backes (née Müller; born 1985) is a German politician serving as a member of the Landtag of Saarland since 2026. She has served as mayor of Sankt Ingbert since 2020, having previously served from 2018 to 2019.
