= Joe Burnside =

British heart transplant recipient

Joe Burnside (1 February 1930 – October 2008) was Britain's longest surviving heart transplant patient.

In February 1980 Burnside suffered his second heart attack in 18 months. At the time he was running a carpet shop in Darlington.

Although he survived the heart attack his prognosis was poor and he was not expected to live for very long. His wife fought for him to be able to have a heart transplant and his local GP contacted Harefield Hospital at Hillingdon in north London.

Professor (now Sir) Magdi Yacoub conducted the operation that took place on 1 July 1980. His new heart came from 18-year-old Peter Everett who had died after an athletics event.

The operation gave Burnside an additional 28 years of life allowing him to celebrate his golden wedding anniversary – he had married on Christmas Day 1957.

After his operation Burnside became a powerful advocate for organ donation, urging more people to sign up to the National Health Service Organ Donor Register.

He is survived by his wife and by their two sons and one daughter.
