= David Backes (author) =

American author and professor

David Backes (born May 14, 1957 in Milwaukee) was an American author and professor, best known as the official biographer of Sigurd F. Olson, who devoted his life to protecting Minnesota's northwoods and the Boundary Waters Canoe Area Wilderness. He published six books related to Olson and the northwoods, and his book, titled A Wilderness Within: The Life of Sigurd F. Olson, won the Small Press Book Award for 1998, and received a positive review in The New York Times.

Backes was a professor in the Journalism, Advertising, and Media Studies department of the University of Wisconsin–Milwaukee until his retirement in 2015.

In Backes' final years, his driving purpose was what he described as a healing ministry, especially the healing of the natural world. Much of his writing late in life was devoted to spreading awareness of the threats posed to the planet, while also reflecting on the beauties and the simplicity of the small things found all around us in everyday life.

His final project before his death was a novel, Listening Point, which has yet to be published.

== Death ==
Backes died on December 23, 2022.

== Works ==
- A Private Wilderness: The Journals of Sigurd F. Olson
- Spirit of the North: The Quotable Sigurd F. Olson
- The Meaning of Wilderness: Essential Articles and Speeches of Sigurd F. Olson.
- Canoe Country: An Embattled Wilderness
- The Wilderness Companion
- A Wilderness Within: The Life of Sigurd F. Olson
