= Burnside, Colchester County =

Community in Nova Scotia, Canada

Coordinates: 45°17′54″N 62°58′40″W

Burnside in Nova Scotia

Burnside is an unincorporated community in the Canadian province of Nova Scotia, located in Colchester County.
