= Birch Lake, Minnesota =

Unorganized territory in Saint Louis County, Minnesota, United States

- Unorganized territory
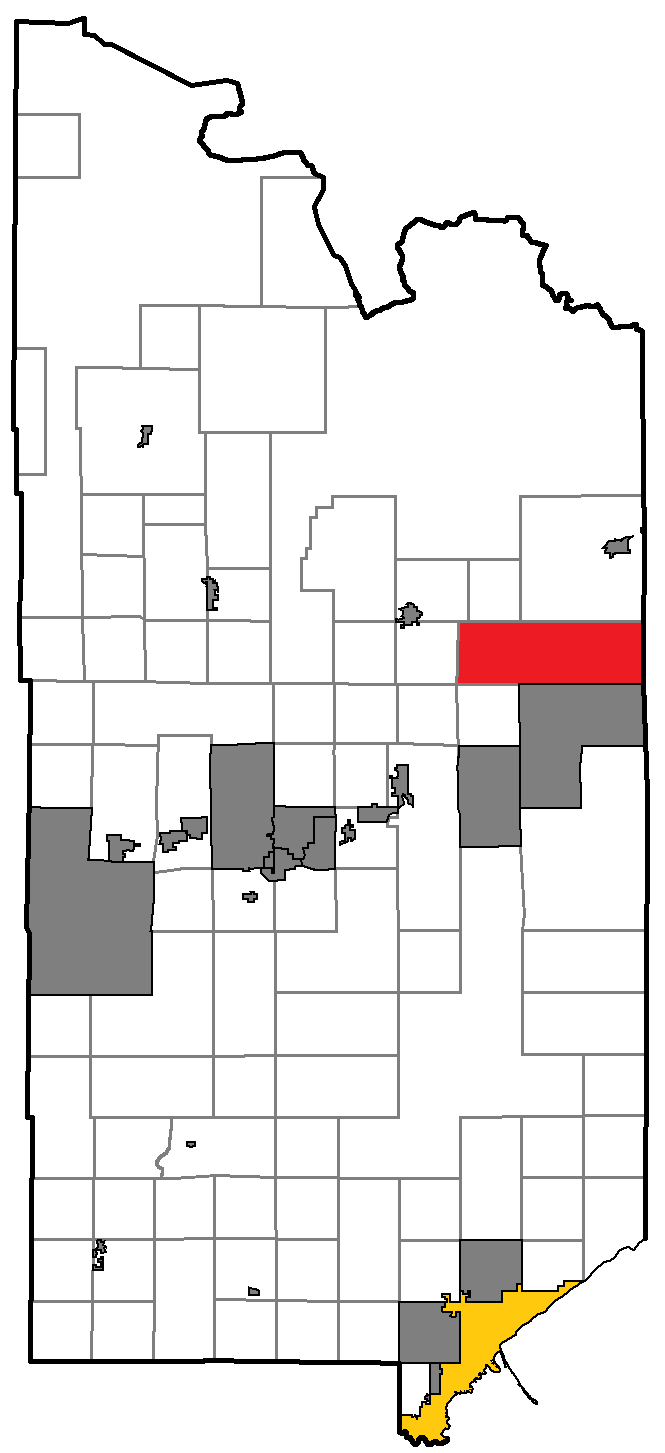
- Location of Birch Lake within St. Louis County, Minnesota
- Coordinates: 47°45′55″N 91°59′14″W
- Country: United States
- State: Minnesota
- County: St. Louis

Area
  - Total: 70.4 sq mi (182 km^{2})
  - Land: 57.8 sq mi (150 km^{2})
  - Water: 12.6 sq mi (33 km^{2})

Population (2020)
  - Total: 481
  - Density: 8.32/sq mi (3.21/km^{2})
- Time zone: UTC–6 (CST)
  - Summer (DST): UTC–5 (CDT)
- ZIP Code: 55731
- Area code: 218

Birch Lake is an unorganized territory in Saint Louis County, Minnesota, United States, located north of Babbitt, and south of Ely and Morse Township. The population was 481 at the 2020 census.

The unorganized territory of Bear Head Lake was merged into Birch Lake prior to the 2010 Census.

== Geography ==
According to the United States Census Bureau, the unorganized territory has a total area of 70.4 square miles (182.3 km^{2}), of which 57.8 square miles (149.7 km^{2}) is land and 12.6 square miles (32.6 km^{2}) (17.88%) is water.

== Demographics ==
At the 2000 census there were 648 people, 236 households, and 175 families living in the unorganized territory. The population density was 11.2 inhabitants per square mile (4.3/km^{2}). There were 457 housing units at an average density of 7.9 per square mile (3.1/km^{2}). The racial makeup of the unorganized territory was 98.77% White, 0.15% Asian, and 1.08% from two or more races. Of the 236 households 25.0% had children under the age of 18 living with them, 65.7% were married couples living together, 3.8% had a female householder with no husband present, and 25.8% were non-families. 22.0% of households were one person and 7.6% were one person aged 65 or older. The average household size was 2.35 and the average family size was 2.73.

The age distribution was 17.1% under the age of 18, 3.7% from 18 to 24, 20.1% from 25 to 44, 27.3% from 45 to 64, and 31.8% 65 or older. The median age was 51 years. For every 100 females, there were 96.4 males. For every 100 females age 18 and over, there were 94.6 males.

The median household income was $37,232 and the median family income was $40,938. Males had a median income of $47,917 versus $35,313 for females. The per capita income for the unorganized territory was $20,615. About 6.6% of families and 10.0% of the population were below the poverty line, including 19.4% of those under age 18 and 3.0% of those age 65 or over.
