= Winton, Minnesota =

City in Minnesota, United States

Winton
- City
- Location of the city of Winton within Saint Louis County, Minnesota
- Coordinates: 47°55′44″N 91°48′5″W
- Country: United States
- State: Minnesota
- County: Saint Louis

Area
  - Total: 0.12 sq mi (0.32 km^{2})
  - Land: 0.12 sq mi (0.32 km^{2})
  - Water: 0 sq mi (0.00 km^{2})
- Elevation: 1,329 ft (405 m)

Population (2020)
  - Total: 169
  - Density: 1,381.9/sq mi (533.54/km^{2})
- Time zone: UTC-6 (Central (CST))
  - Summer (DST): UTC-5 (CDT)
- ZIP codes: 55796
- Area code: 218
- FIPS code: 27-71140
- GNIS feature ID: 0662813
- Website: https://www.wintonmn.com/

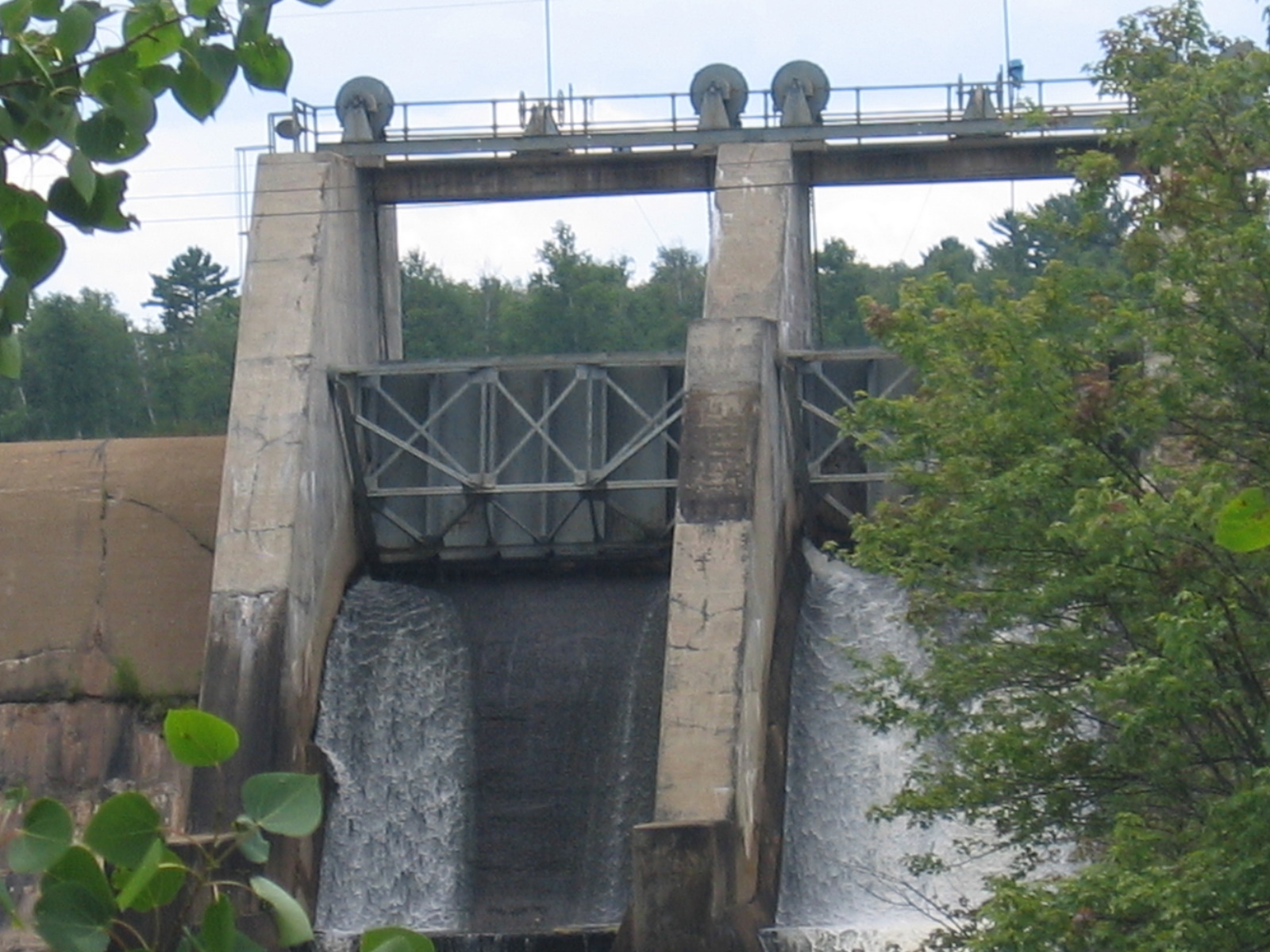
The Winton Hydro Electric Dam

Winton is a city in Saint Louis County, Minnesota, United States. The population was 169 at the 2020 census. The city is home to a small hydroelectric dam on the edge of Garden Lake, one of 11 stations owned by Minnesota Power.

State Highway 169 serves as a main route into Winton. It is 4 mi (6.4 km) northeast of Ely, Minnesota.

== History ==
A post office called Winton was established in 1895, and remained in operation until 1996. The city was named for William C. Winton, a businessperson in the lumber industry.

== Geography ==
The city of Winton is located within the northeast quadrant of Morse Township but is a separate political entity. According to the United States Census Bureau, the city has a total area of 0.13 square miles (0.34 km^{2}), all land.

== Demographics ==
Historical population
Census	Pop.	Note	%±
1910	426		—
1920	499		17.1%
1930	341		−31.7%
1940	224		−34.3%
1950	184		−17.9%
1960	182		−1.1%
1970	294		61.5%
1980	276		−6.1%
1990	169		−38.8%
2000	185		9.5%
2010	172		−7.0%
2020	169		−1.7%
U.S. Decennial Census

=== 2010 census ===
As of the census of 2010, there were 172 people, 88 households, and 40 families living in the city. The population density was 1,323.1 inhabitants per square mile (510.9/km^{2}). There were 110 housing units at an average density of 846.2 per square mile (326.7/km^{2}). The racial makeup of the city was 98.8% White and 1.2% from two or more races.

There were 88 households, of which 18.2% had children under the age of 18 living with them, 34.1% were married couples living together, 6.8% had a female householder with no husband present, 4.5% had a male householder with no wife present, and 54.5% were non-families. 45.5% of all households were made up of individuals, and 12.5% had someone living alone who was 65 years of age or older. The average household size was 1.95 and the average family size was 2.75.

The median age in the city was 45.5 years. 19.8% of residents were under the age of 18; 8.2% were between the ages of 18 and 24; 21% were from 25 to 44; 33.7% were from 45 to 64; and 17.4% were 65 years of age or older. The gender makeup of the city was 59.9% male and 40.1% female.

=== 2000 census ===
As of the census of 2000, there were 185 people, 85 households, and 49 families living in the city. The population density was 1,421.2 inhabitants per square mile (548.7/km^{2}). There were 97 housing units at an average density of 745.2 per square mile (287.7/km^{2}). The racial makeup of the city was 99.46% White and 0.54% Native American. 22.4% were of German, 17.8% Finnish, 8.6% Slovene, 7.2% Norwegian, 7.2% Scandinavian, 6.6% Swedish, 5.9% Polish and 5.3% English ancestry.

There were 85 households, out of which 25.9% had children under the age of 18 living with them, 45.9% were married couples living together, 7.1% had a female householder with no husband present, and 41.2% were non-families. 37.6% of all households were made up of individuals, and 11.8% had someone living alone who was 65 years of age or older. The average household size was 2.18 and the average family size was 2.84.

In the city, the population was spread out, with 22.2% under the age of 18, 9.7% from 18 to 24, 32.4% from 25 to 44, 21.6% from 45 to 64, and 14.1% who were 65 years of age or older. The median age was 40 years. For every 100 females, there were 117.6 males. For every 100 females age 18 and over, there were 111.8 males.

The median income for a household in the city was $29,063, and the median income for a family was $41,250. Males had a median income of $38,750 versus $14,688 for females. The per capita income for the city was $18,017. About 1.9% of families and 8.9% of the population were below the poverty line, including 5.0% of those under the age of eighteen and 7.4% of those 65 or over.

== Climate ==
The Köppen Climate Classification subtype for this climate is "Dfb" (Warm Summer Continental Climate).

Climate data for Winton, Minnesota
Month	Jan	Feb	Mar	Apr	May	Jun	Jul	Aug	Sep	Oct	Nov	Dec	Year
Mean daily maximum °C (°F)	−10 (14)	−5 (23)	2 (35)	9 (49)	18 (65)	23 (73)	26 (78)	24 (75)	18 (64)	10 (50)	0 (32)	−8 (18)	9 (48)
Mean daily minimum °C (°F)	−23 (−9)	−19 (−2)	−12 (10)	−3 (26)	5 (41)	11 (51)	13 (56)	12 (54)	7 (44)	1 (33)	−8 (17)	−18 (0)	−3 (27)
Average precipitation mm (inches)	28 (1.1)	20 (0.8)	30 (1.2)	41 (1.6)	74 (2.9)	110 (4.2)	94 (3.7)	97 (3.8)	91 (3.6)	61 (2.4)	43 (1.7)	25 (1)	710 (27.9)
Source: Weatherbase
