= Morse Township, St. Louis County, Minnesota =

Morse Township, Minnesota
- Township
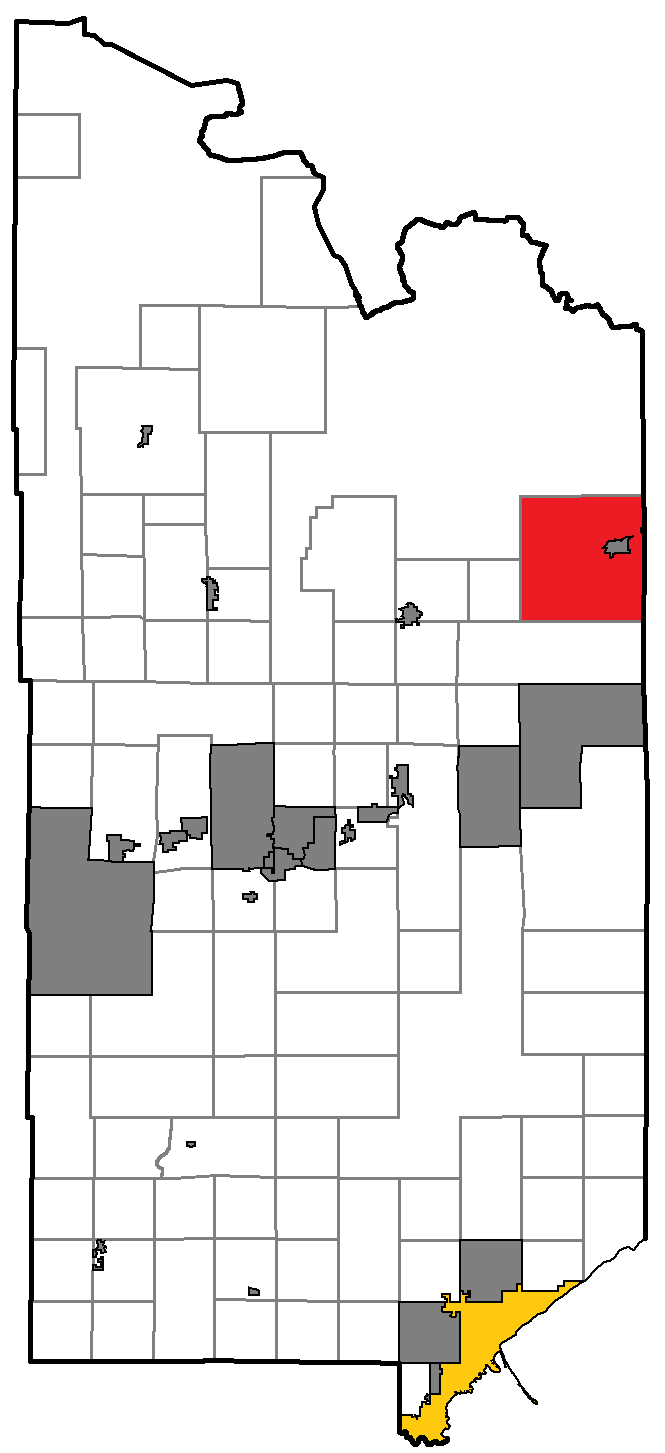
- Location of Morse Township within St. Louis County, Minnesota

- Location within the state of Minnesota Morse Township, Minnesota (the United States)
- Coordinates: 47°53′51″N 91°54′6″W
- Country: United States
- State: Minnesota
- County: Saint Louis

Area
  - Total: 138.1 sq mi (357.7 km^{2})
  - Land: 115.6 sq mi (299.4 km^{2})
  - Water: 22.5 sq mi (58.3 km^{2})
- Elevation: 1,375 ft (419 m)

Population (2020)
  - Total: 1,188
  - Density: 10.28/sq mi (3.968/km^{2})
- Time zone: UTC-6 (Central (CST))
  - Summer (DST): UTC-5 (CDT)
- FIPS code: 27-44350
- GNIS feature ID: 0665043
- Website: https://www.morsemnslc.gov/

Morse Township is a township in Saint Louis County, Minnesota, United States. The population was 1,188 at the 2020 census.

State Highways 1 (MN 1) and 169 (MN 169) are two of the main routes in the township. Other routes include Saint Louis County Road 88 (Grant–McMahan Boulevard), County Road 116 (Echo Trail), and County Road 21.

The unincorporated communities of Burntside and Robinson are in Morse Township.

The city of Ely is located within Morse Township geographically but is a separate entity.

The city of Winton is geographically within the northeast edge of the township, but is a separate entity.

== History ==
Morse Township was named for J. C. Morse, a businessperson in the mining industry.

== Geography ==
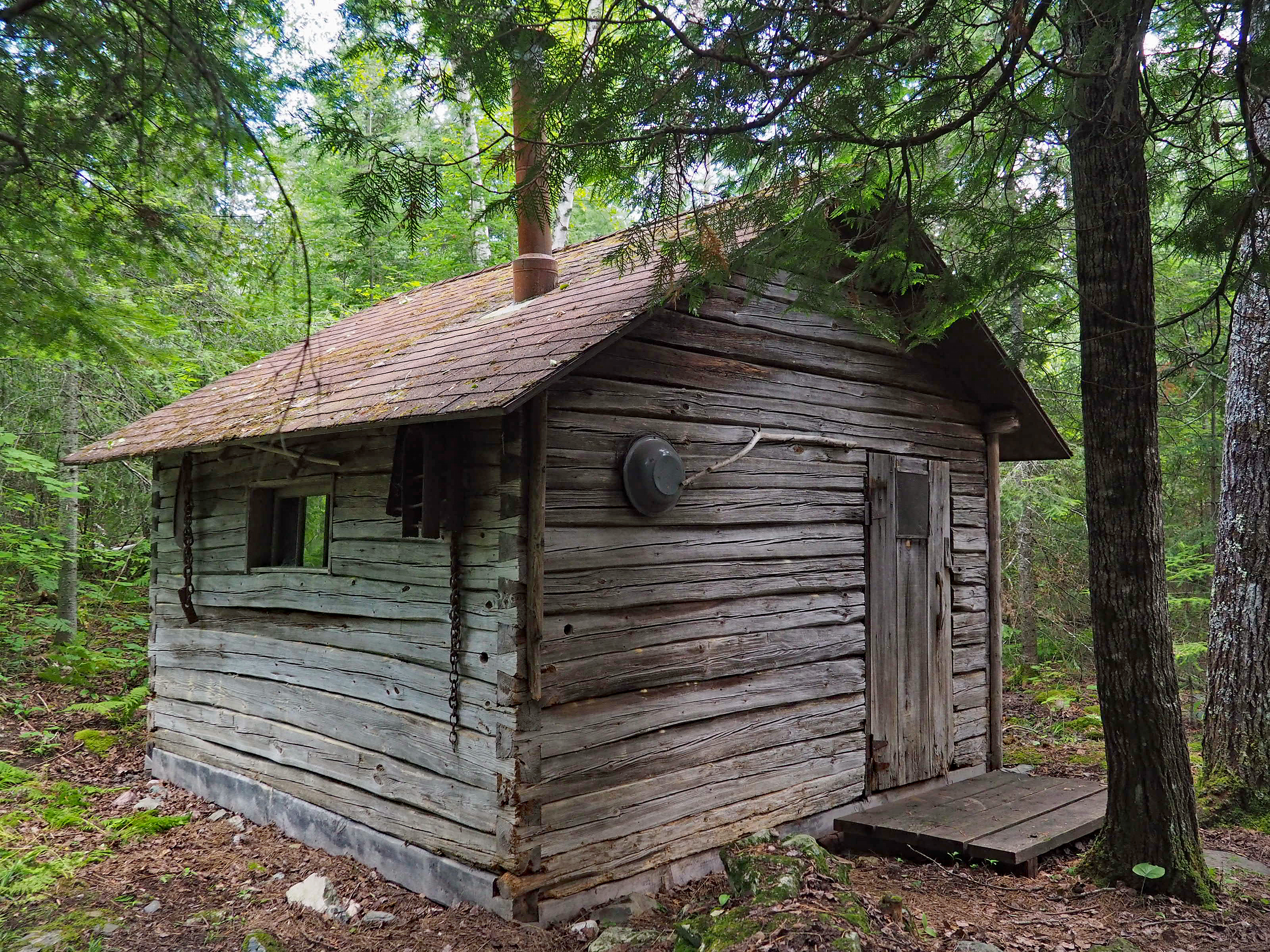
An old sauna of Listening Point on the shores of Burntside Lake in Morse Township

According to the United States Census Bureau, the township has a total area of 138.1 square miles (358 km^{2}); 115.6 square miles (299 km^{2}) is land and 22.5 square miles (58 km^{2}), or 16.29%, is water.

Several rivers flow through Morse Township: the Burntside River in the west–central part of the township, a short section of the Dead River in the north–central part, the Shagawa River in the east–central part, the Bear Island River in the southeast, and the Beaver River in the southwest.

Creeks that flow through the township include Armstrong, Crab, Longstorff, and Johnson.

Burntside Lake and Shagawa Lake are both in the northern part of Morse Township. White Iron Lake is partially within the township. Part of Morse Township is in the Superior National Forest.

The southern half of the township is in the Bear Island State Forest. Part of the township is in the Burntside State Forest. The northwest corner of Morse Township is in the Boundary Waters Canoe Area Wilderness.

=== Adjacent townships and communities ===
The following are adjacent to Morse Township :

- Eagles Nest Township (west)
- Crab Lake Unorganized Territory (west)
- Northeast Saint Louis Unorganized Territory (northwest)
- Slim Lake Unorganized Territory (north)
- Fall Lake Township of Lake County (east and northeast)
- Stony River Township of Lake County (southeast)
- Birch Lake Unorganized Territory (south)
- Bear Head Lake Unorganized Territory (southwest)

=== Unincorporated communities ===
- Burntside
- Robinson

== Demographics ==
As of the census of 2000, there were 1,229 people, 543 households, and 363 families residing in the township. The population density was 10.6 people per square mile (4.1/km^{2}). There were 1,117 housing units at an average density of 9.7/sq mi (3.7/km^{2}). The racial makeup of the township was 97.23% White, 0.08% African American, 0.81% Native American, 0.08% Asian, 0.24% from other races, and 1.55% from two or more races. Hispanic or Latino of any race were 1.14% of the population.

There were 543 households, out of which 24.7% had children under the age of 18 living with them, 61.5% were married couples living together, 2.6% had a female householder with no husband present, and 33.1% were non-families. 28.9% of all households were made up of individuals, and 11.2% had someone living alone who was 65 years of age or older. The average household size was 2.26 and the average family size was 2.79.

In the township the population was spread out, with 19.9% under the age of 18, 5.2% from 18 to 24, 22.1% from 25 to 44, 34.5% from 45 to 64, and 18.2% who were 65 years of age or older. The median age was 46 years. For every 100 females, there were 114.5 males. For every 100 females age 18 and over, there were 110.7 males.

The median income for a household in the township was $36,944, and the median income for a family was $50,417. Males had a median income of $39,896 versus $29,688 for females. The per capita income for the township was $21,503. About 3.4% of families and 4.4% of the population were below the poverty line, including 4.0% of those under age 18 and 3.6% of those age 65 or over.
