= Bournside =

Village in Gloucestershire, England

Coordinates: 51.88°N 02.10°W

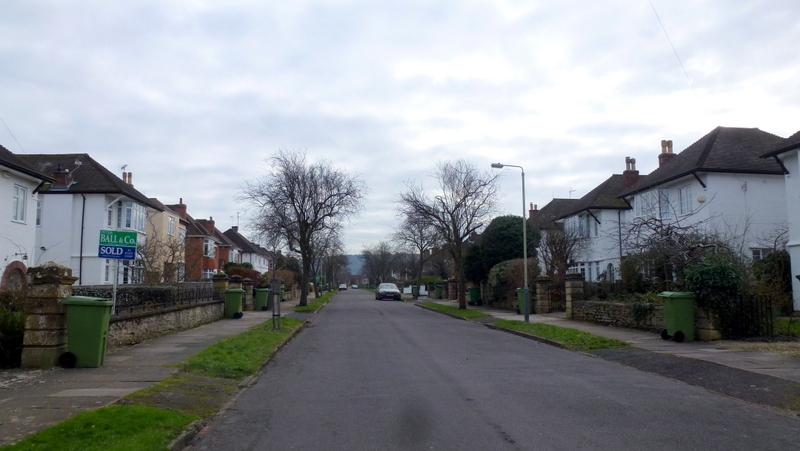
- Bournside Road, Cheltenham

- Location within Gloucestershire
- OS grid reference: SO9321
- Shire county: Gloucestershire
- Region: South West
- Country: England
- Sovereign state: United Kingdom
- Police: Gloucestershire
- Fire: Gloucestershire
- Ambulance: South Western

Bournside is a village, which is now a suburb of Cheltenham in Gloucestershire, England.
