= Burntside State Forest =

State forest in Minnesota, United States

- Location within Minnesota
- Interactive map of Burntside State Forest

Geography
- Location: Lake and Saint Louis counties, Minnesota, United States
- Coordinates: 47°55′11″N 92°06′05″W
- Area: 74,815 acres (30,277 ha)

Administration
- Established: 1905
- Authority: United States Forest Service, Minnesota Department of Natural Resources
- Website: www.dnr.state.mn.us/state_forests/sft00011/index.html

Ecology
- WWF Classification: Western Great Lakes Forests
- EPA Classification: Northern Lakes and Forests
- Disturbance: Wildfire
- Dominant tree species: Pinus banksiana, Populus tremuloides, Pinus strobus, Picea mariana, Abies balsamea

The Burntside State Forest is a state forest located near the town of Ely in Lake and Saint Louis counties, Minnesota. 82% of the forest land falls within the limits of the Boundary Waters Canoe Area Wilderness to the north which belongs to the Superior National Forest, and thus falls under the federal jurisdiction of the United States Forest Service.

There are over 43 lakes in the forest, the rough topography of the area is due to its situation in the Laurentian Upland. There are six public accesses to the 7,313 acres (2,959 ha) Burntside Lake within the forest, which has substantial populations of walleye, lake trout, and the common loon.

Prior to the arrival of lumberjacks in the late nineteenth century, the forest was mostly covered with young jack pine, a nearly unprofitable timber tree. The land speculators and lumberjacks left that area in 1874, after a wildfire destroyed the maturing trees, allowing jack pine and aspen to become established.
