= Burntside River =

Coordinates: 47.9185156°N 91.9165324°W

Location
- Country: United States

Physical characteristics
- Source
  - location: Minnesota

The Burntside River is a river of Minnesota. The river flows through the west–central portion of Morse Township in northern Saint Louis County. The river originates from Burntside Lake and flows east-northeast to Shagawa Lake.

The river's name comes from the Ojibwe Indians, for nearby areas burned in wildfires.

== See also ==
- List of rivers of Minnesota
