= Frank Herbert Burnside =

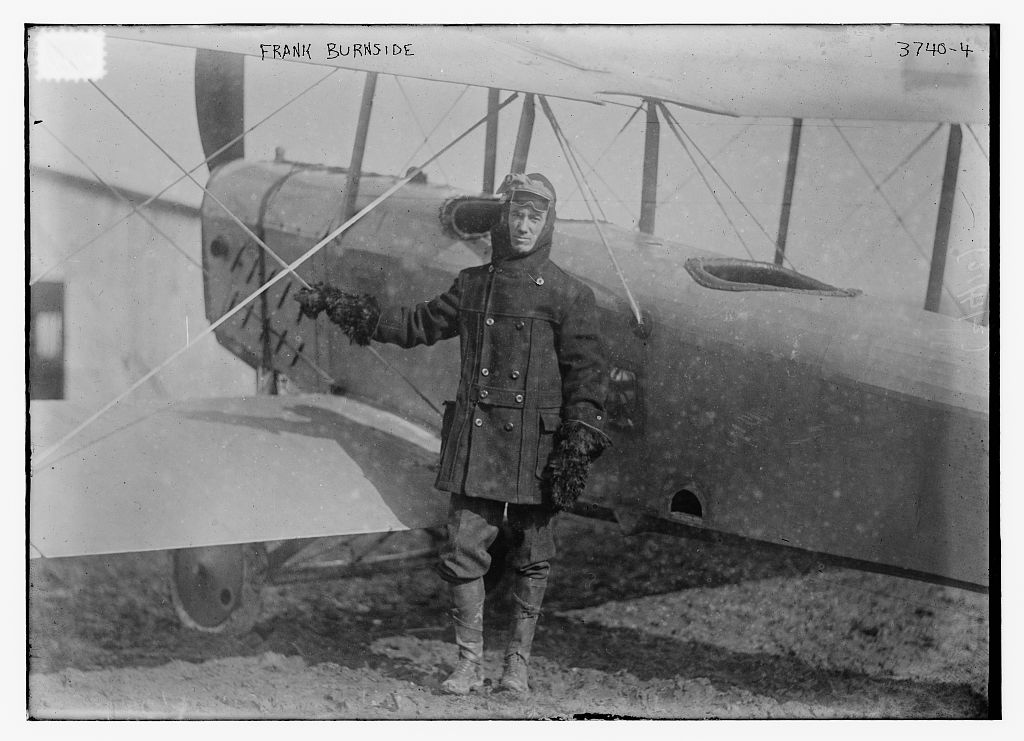
Frank Burnside in 1916

Frank Herbert Burnside (August 7, 1888 - August 26, 1935) was an American record-holding pioneer airmail pilot.

== Biography ==
Frank Herbert Burnside was born on August 7, 1888, in Oneonta, New York. He originally studied to be a musician, but learned to fly in 1911. In 1913 he set the American flight altitude record at 12,950 feet in Bath, New York besting the record set by Lincoln Beachey in Chicago in 1911.

Burnside retired from flying in 1931 and he died on August 26, 1935, in Bath, New York.

== Aviation records ==
- American flight altitude record of 12,950 feet in Bath, New York (1913).
- American air speed record of 95.0 and 97.4 mph (1916).
- American (and possibly world) air speed record of 163.68 mph (1919).
