= Robert H. Burnside =

American politician (1933–2021)

Member of the South Carolina House of Representatives for Saluda County
- In office 1971–1978

Personal details
- Born: May 20, 1933 Columbia, South Carolina
- Died: August 2, 2021 (aged 88) Columbia, South Carolina
- Party: Democratic
- Education: Presbyterian College (BA)
- Occupation: lawyer

Robert Henry Burnside (May 20, 1933 – August 2, 2021) was an American politician in the state of South Carolina. He served in the South Carolina House of Representatives as a member of the Democratic Party from 1971 to 1978, representing Richland County, South Carolina. He was a lawyer.
