= Bob Burnside =

American lifeguard (1932–2019)

Robert MacKenzie Burnside (May 20, 1932 – December 11, 2019) was an American lifeguard. He was appointed the first president of the Surf Life Saving Association of America in 1964, which later became known as the United States Lifesaving Association. In 1965, he was appointed president of the National Surf Life Saving Association. In 1967, he developed the revolutionary plastic “Burnside Rescue Can”, now a standard for lifeguards worldwide and iconic symbol of beach lifeguarding. He was a champion swimmer who introduced the Malibu balsa surfboard to Australia. He wrote the History of Junior Lifeguarding.

== Childhood ==
Burnside was born in Los Angeles, California, attended Black Foxe Military Institution. His early childhood was spent in Key West, Florida. His mother was Jane Mackenzie, a Ziegfeld Follies Dancer. His aquatic career was influenced by his stepfather, 1920 Olympian Harold Kruger.

== Lifeguard career ==
Burnside was hired as an ocean lifeguard by Los Angeles County in 1951. When a representative of Surf Life Saving Australia met with Los Angeles County lifeguard leaders, Burnside was appointed to become the president of what was to be called the Surf Life Saving Association of America, created solely to compete in Australia at the first international lifesaving competition to be held there in conjunction with the 1956 Olympics. He was a member of the team that traveled to Australia to compete. The team brought Malibu balsa surfboards, which revolutionized surfing in Australia, where up to that time Australians were using boards made of hollow construction mahogany plywood. The team also brought aluminum rescue buoys and the Peterson rescue tube, which were quickly adopted by Australian lifeguards who had previously depended solely on the belt and reel. Burnside placed third in the international belt race at Melbourne, Torquay.

In 1963, he invited lifeguards from various lifeguard agencies in Southern California with the concept of creating a true national association of professional ocean lifeguards. In 1964, the Surf Life Saving Association of America was formally created as a nonprofit organization of professional beach lifeguards. Burnside was elected president and served in that capacity for four years. The organization changed its name twice and is now known as the United States Lifesaving Association. In 1967, he served as manager of a new competition team which toured and competed in Australia and New Zealand. The following year, 1968, he toured the East Coast of the US in an effort to promote membership, broadening interest to help move the organization toward a true national base.

== Honors ==
Burnside was a recipient of the Australian Bronze Medallion, the Canadian and Royal Lifesaving Instructors Certificate, the New Zealand Instructors Certification, and the American Red Cross Instructors Certification for first aid and water safety. He has been certified by the United States Coast Guard as a rescue Boat operator. He was part of the first certified Los Angeles County Diving Scuba instructors and a longtime member of the department's Underwater Recovery Unit. This unit was called the USSU (Underwater & Rescue Unit), which was the first such team in the west.

In 1990, he became grand champion of the World Body Surfing Championships.

He was the recipient of the 2014 Paragon Award for Water Safety given by the International Swimming Hall of Fame.
