= Robert Burnside (minister) =

Robert Burnside (31 August 1759 – 19 May 1826) was an English Baptist minister.

== Biography ==
He was born in the parish of Clerkenwell, Central London and educated at Merchant Taylors' School and at Aberdeen University, where he graduated with an M.A. In 1780 he was appointed afternoon preacher at the Seventh Day Baptist Church, Curriers' Hall, London, and in 1785 became pastor of that congregation. In 1799 he moved to Redcross Street, and thence to Devonshire Square. As a teacher of languages he amassed a considerable fortune. He died in Snow's Fields, Bermondsey, on 19 May 1826. His works published in several volumes are The Religion of Mankind, in a Series of Essays (1819), Tea-Table Chat, or Religious Allegories told at the Tea-Table in a Seminary for Ladies (1820), Remarks on the different Sentiments entertained in Christendom relative to the Weekly Sabbath (1825).
