= Burntside Lake =

Lake in the state of Minnesota, United States

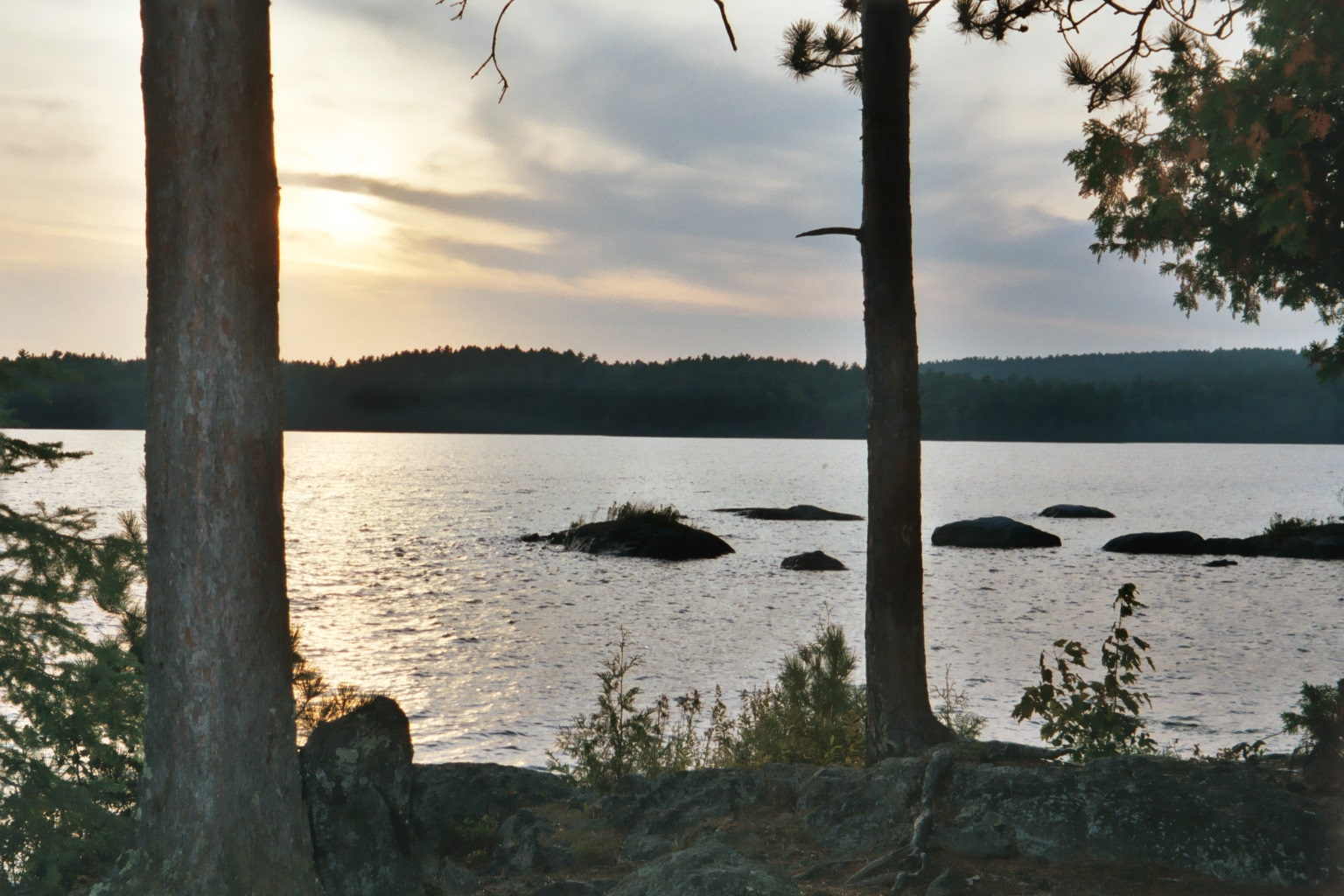

- Location within Minnesota
- Interactive map of Burntside Lake
- Location: Morse Township / Slim Lake, Saint Louis County, near Ely, Minnesota
- Coordinates: 47°55′27″N 91°59′42″W
- Primary inflows: Tamarack Creek, Coo Lake, Crab Lake, Slim Lake, Hanson Lake, Chant Lake, Everett Lake (via Twin Lakes and Dead River), Minister Lake
- Primary outflows: Burntside River
- Basin countries: United States
- Surface area: 7,139 acres (2,889 ha)
- Max. depth: 126 ft (38 m)
- Surface elevation: 1,371 ft (418 m)
- Islands: >100

Burntside Lake is a 7,139-acre (28.89 km^{2}) lake, located 3 miles (4.8 km) northwest of Ely, Minnesota, in Saint Louis County, Minnesota. Its western boundary adjoins the Boundary Waters Canoe Area Wilderness on Tamarack Creek.

Native fish include Bluegill, Golden Shiner, Green Sunfish, Lake Trout, Lake Whitefish, Northern Pike, Rainbow Smelt, Rock Bass, Shorthead Redhorse, Smallmouth Bass, Walleye, White Sucker and Yellow Perch.

On its shores are two historic resorts with original hand-scribed log cabins, both built in the early 1900s and operating continuously since then: Burntside Lodge (1913) and Camp Van Vac (1918). The YMCA's Camp Widjiwagan is also located on the lake's shore.

Burntside Lake's more than 100 islands include Beach; Bear; Berry; Blueberry; Brownell; Burnt; Burntside Islands; Gem; Dollar; Evans; Good Dog; Half Dollar; Honeymoon; Indian; Lockhart; Long; Lost Girl; Miller; Oliver; Picnic; Porkchop; Ripple; Snake; State; Sumpter; Waters; and many more.

Long Island was recently acquired by the Trust for Public Land.

The Burntside Islands (Snellman and Pine) are SNAs (Scientific and Natural Areas, gifted by the Nature Conservancy) held by the DNR.
