= Elsa Jemne =

American painter

Elsa Laubach Jemne
- Jemne in 1922
- Born: 1887; St. Paul, Minnesota
- Died: 1974 (aged 86–87)
- Other name: Elsa Jemne
- Education: St. Paul Institute, Pennsylvania Academy of Fine Arts
- Occupations: Painter, Illustrator

Elsa Laubach Jemne (1887–1974) was an American landscape painter, portraitist, muralist and illustrator born in St. Paul, Minnesota. She attended the St. Paul Institute before continuing her art studies at the Pennsylvania Academy of Fine Arts in Philadelphia.

Jemne returned to the Midwest, where she made most of her art. She completed several murals in Minnesota and Wisconsin on commission for the Section of Painting and Sculpture, which were created in public buildings such as post offices and courthouses. She also had works in local schools and similar institutions, and illustrated several books, including two by Norwegian writer Marie Hamsun translated into English.

== Education ==
Jemne was a student of Violet Oakley, Cecilia Beaux, Daniel Garber, Emil Carlsen, and Joseph Pearson. She was awarded the Cresson Traveling Scholarship in both 1914 and 1915. While still a student, Jemne made commercial art, which she found "stupid, uncongenial, & maddening in its monotony."

== Life ==
Elsa Jemne became an advocate for art and culture in her home state of Minnesota in the early 20th century during the Great Depression. Not interested in commercial art, she traveled by bus throughout what is known as "the Iron Range of Northern Minnesota." She was commissioned to paint several murals depicting locally and regionally important themes. She completed six murals under the auspices of the Section of Painting and Sculpture, which commissioned works for United States post offices and courthouses. She completed Minnesota, an allegorical depiction of her home state, in 1937, in a style that reveals the influence of both Oakey and Diego Rivera on her work.

She had married architect Magnus Jemne, with whom she sometimes collaborated. One of their collaborations was the Art Moderne-style Saint Paul Women's City Club. Elsa Laubach Jemne died in St. Paul, Minnesota in 1974.

== Work ==
- Her New Deal artworks include pieces in the following buildings:
  - Hutchinson, Minnesota post office, mural titled The Hutchinson Singers, completed in 1942, egg tempera on plaster
  - Brandon Auditorium and Fire Hall, large mural painting for city council room
  - Ely, Minnesota post office, two tempera-on-plaster murals titled Iron-Ore Mines and Wilderness
  - Ladysmith, Wisconsin post office, tempera on plaster mural titled Development of the Land, completed in 1938; since painted over
  - Lake Geneva, Wisconsin post office, oil on canvas mural titled Winter Landscape, completed in 1940
  - Stearns County Courthouse in St. Cloud, Minnesota
  - Minneapolis Armory, headquarters for Minnesota National Guard, where she painted alongside Lucia Wiley, also from that state

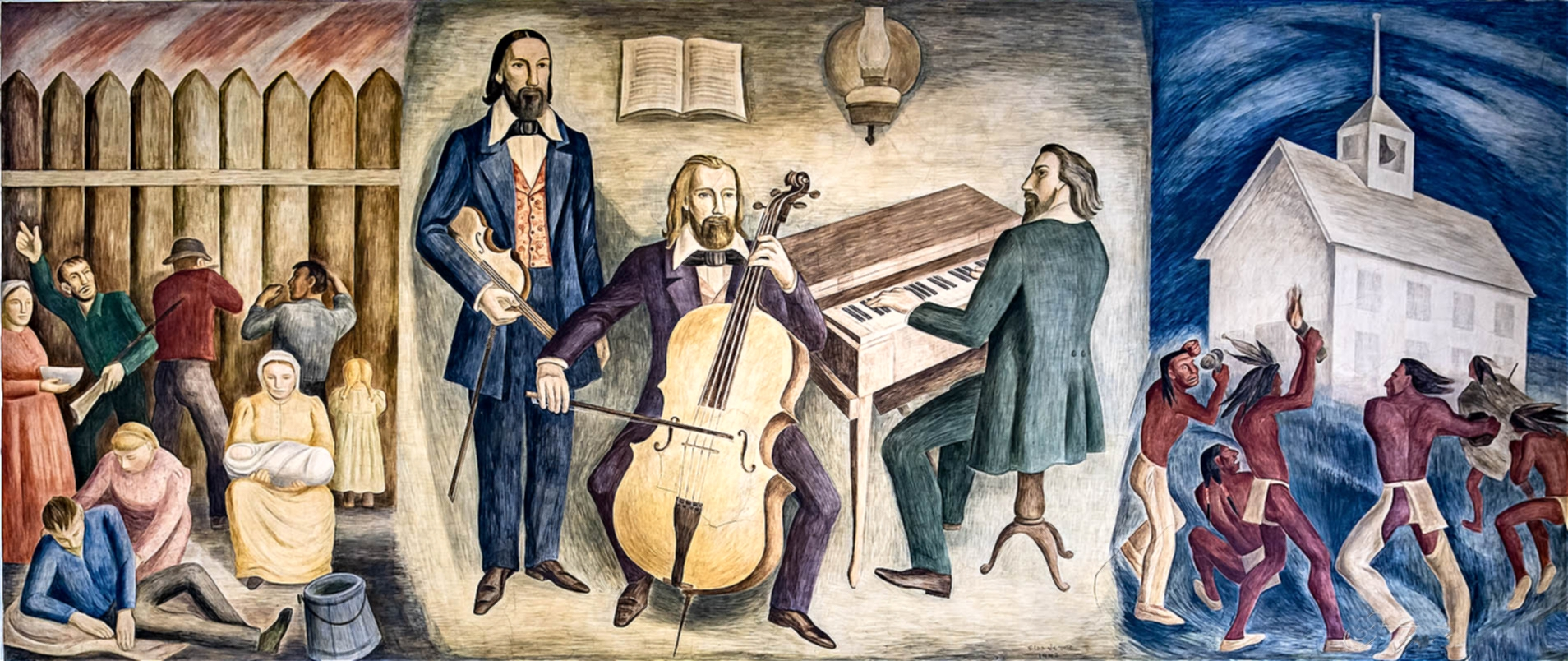
The Hutchinson Singers (1942)

In addition, Jemne had other commissions:

- Central High School, Minneapolis
- Leamy House, Philadelphia, Pennsylvania
- Nurses Home, St. Luke’s Hospital
- Northern Shores Power Company building
- Saint Paul Women's City Club, St. Paul, murals and terrazzo floors
- Community House, Brandon, Minnesota
- She illustrated a number of books:
  - Rudi Finds a Way, by Yolanda Foldes
  - A Norwegian Family, by Marie Hamsun and translated by Maida Castelhun Darnton
  - A Norwegian Farm by Marie Hamsun; abridged and translated by Maida Castelhun Darnton
  - We of Frabo Stand by Loring MacKaye
