= Ely, Minnesota =

City in Minnesota, United States

Ely
- City
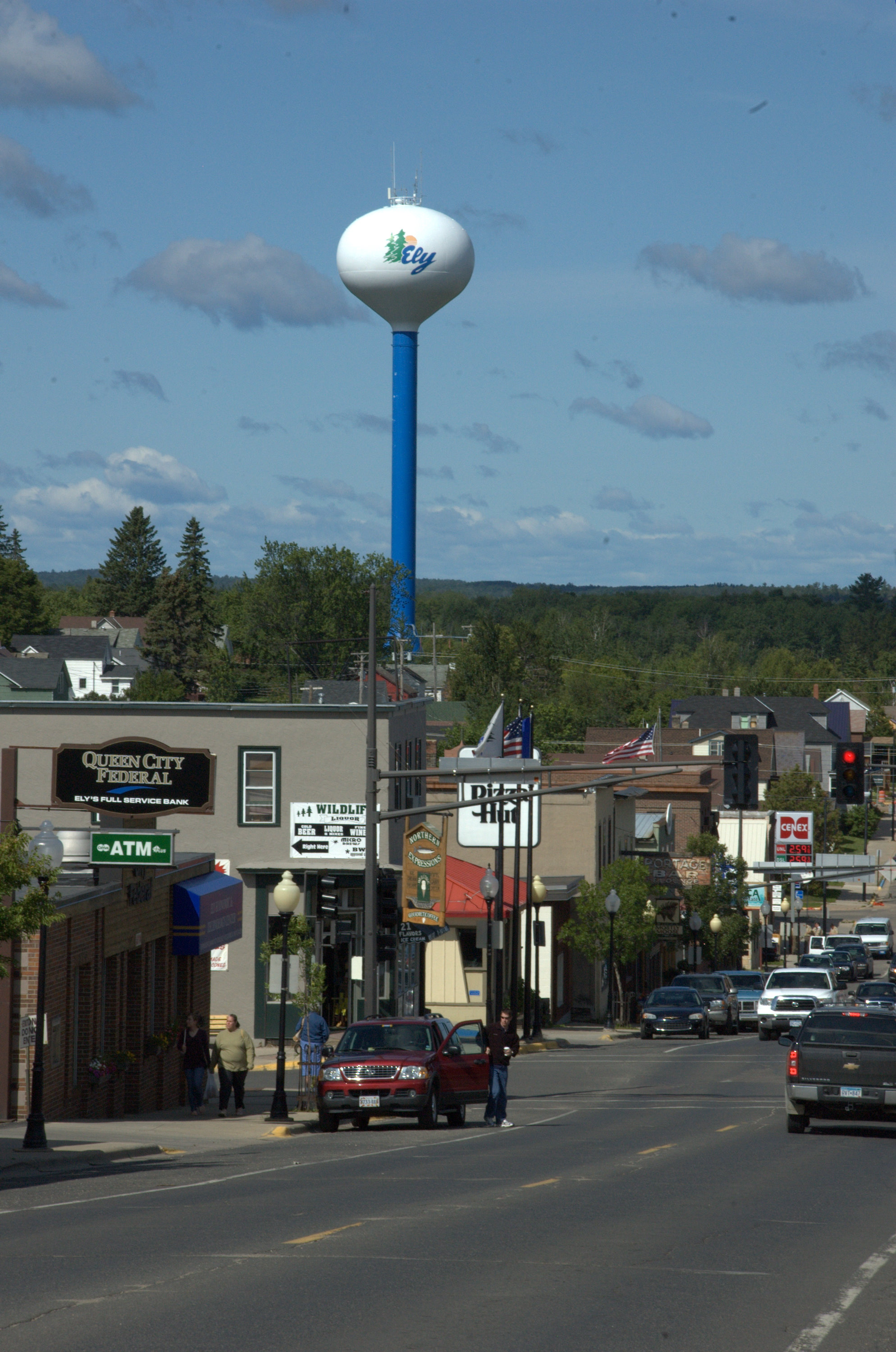

- Location of the city of Ely within Saint Louis County, Minnesota
- Coordinates: 47°54′8″N 91°51′21″W
- Country: United States
- State: Minnesota
- County: St. Louis

Area
  - Total: 2.93 sq mi (7.59 km^{2})
  - Land: 2.92 sq mi (7.57 km^{2})
  - Water: 0.0077 sq mi (0.02 km^{2})
- Elevation: 1,434 ft (437 m)

Population (2020)
  - Total: 3,268
  - Density: 1,117.6/sq mi (431.51/km^{2})
- Time zone: UTC−6 (Central (CST))
  - Summer (DST): UTC−5 (CDT)
- ZIP Code: 55731
- Area code: 218
- FIPS code: 27-19142
- GNIS feature ID: 0661205
- Website: www.ely.mn.us

Ely (/ˈiːli/ EE-lee) is a city in St. Louis County, Minnesota, United States. The population was 3,268 at the 2020 census.

Located on the Vermilion iron range, Ely once had several iron ore mines. It is an entry point for campers and canoers into the Boundary Waters Canoe Area Wilderness and Canada's Quetico Provincial Park wilderness area. The International Wolf Center and the North American Bear Center are nearby.

Ely's main street has nature outfitters, outdoor clothing stores, and restaurants. MN 1, MN 169, and County Road 21 (Central Avenue) are Ely's main routes. The city is 16 mi (26 km) south of the Canadian border and is within the Superior National Forest.

== History ==
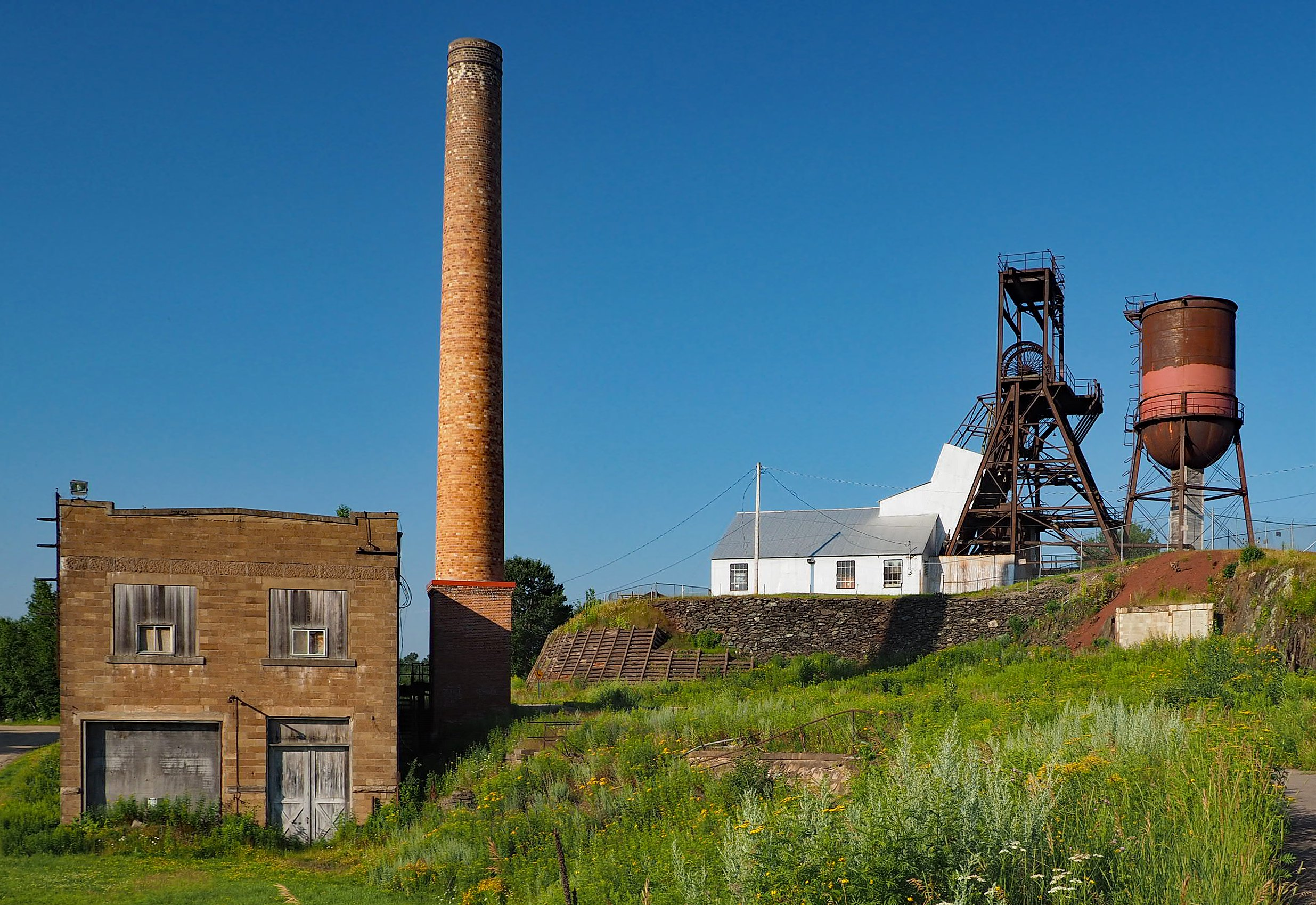
Pioneer Mine

The first Europeans to explore the area were fur traders who made their way into the wilderness in search of furs. But it was the Lake Vermillion gold rush that brought the first large numbers of pioneers to the area in 1865. Although hardly any gold was ever found, it was discovered that the area did contain large deposits of iron ore. Thousands of new immigrants were arriving in America at that time, and many of them came to the area later known as the Minnesota Iron Range, looking for work.

When the Duluth, Missabe and Iron Range Railway laid tracks extending the rails from Tower to Ely in 1888, Ely began mining operations with the opening of the Chandler Mine. Ore was shipped by rail to docks on Lake Superior in Two Harbors and Duluth. From there it was shipped by lake freighter for processing in Ashtabula and other points in Ohio.

That year the miners incorporated the town of Florence, population 177, near the east side of Shagawa Lake on a site now known as Spaulding. Florence was named after the daughter of the Chandler mine's Captain Jack Pengilly (also the town's first mayor). After ore was discovered farther west, the town relocated and subsequently changed its name to Ely. Since the name "Florence" was already in use by another village in Minnesota, "Ely" was chosen to honor of mining executive Samuel B. Ely, a big promoter of Vermilion Range ore who lived in Michigan. (He is not known to have visited his namesake town.) In 2020, The Ely Echo wrote:

The name Ely stems from the "Isle of Eels," a wetlands near Cambridge, England. In historic times, those lakes swarmed with the slithery fish (similar to eelpout) that provided sustenance for ancestors of Samuel B. Ely. His clan arrived in the states (from Ely, England) in the 1600s (one ancestor was a close associate of George Washington). Samuel, a mining executive, financed the railroad to Ely in 1888 which launched our town. He embraced Ojibwe culture and applied native names to some of his mining projects, including Ontonagon (hunting river) & Ishpeming (heaven), Michigan. Samuel's great grandson, Courtland Ely III, was Grand Marshal at Ely's 1988 Centennial Parade, stayed with Schurkes at Wintergreen & was given keys to the city by Gov. Rudy Perpich (an Iron Ranger from Hibbing).

The original town site consisted of 40 acres. A man named McCormick opened the first grocery store in a small log building. A. J. Fenske built the first frame building in the fall of 1887; and he also opened a hardware and furniture store. The Pioneer Hotel was also built that year at the corner of Sheridan Street and Fourth Avenue. The first school opened in 1889 in a small frame building on Second Avenue; its enrollment was 112 during the first season.

According to a history written in 1910, "The first religious service was conducted by Father Buh, who came from Tower for that purpose, and the Catholic congregation erected the first church. The first Protestant minister was Rev. Mr. Freeman, who arrived in time to hold an Easter service in 1889, and located here permanently, organizing the Presbyterian church. There are now six churches, representing as many different faiths.

Soon other mines opened in Ely: The Pioneer Mine (1889), the Zenith (1892), the Savoy (1899), and the Sibley (1899). The Pioneer was by far the most productive, producing 41 million tons or 40% of the Vermilion Range's entire output. Eventually 11 mines opened near Ely. In 1967 the Pioneer mine closed. It is on the National Register of Historic Places and its offices house the Ely Arts & Heritage Center.

Originally the mining was an open-pit operation, but when the abundant ore was mined out, deep shafts were made to start mining underground. With the need for wooden support beams to keep the tunnels from collapsing and for lumber to meet the needs of the ever-expanding growth in the area, the logging and milling industries grew. Logging continues in the region, though on a limited scale and only for paper pulp—the major operations virtually disappeared by 1920 when the area's tree reserves were depleted.

Ely would not suffer the decline of other mining towns, as the nearby Boundary Waters Canoe Area Wilderness would bring tourists and campers to the city, supplying the city with an annual summertime economic boost. In 2021, the Boundary Waters were closed for two weeks due to wildfires, however the city was able to quickly economically recover. In 2026, the city would be impacted by the nearby 2026 Minnesota wildfires.

== Geography ==
According to the United States Census Bureau, the city has an area of 2.74 square miles (7.10 km^{2}); 2.73 square miles (7.07 km^{2}) is land and 0.01 square miles (0.03 km^{2}) is water.

Ely is 100 miles (160 km) north of Duluth, 117 miles southeast of International Falls, and 244 miles (393 km) north of the Twin Cities.

=== Environment ===
==== Copper mining controversy ====
Since the 1960s, as Iron Range mines began closing, leaving only a few in operation, Ely, like many northern Minnesota communities, faced economic decline. Duluth, on the shores of Lake Superior, built a tourist trade that has helped to sustain its economy. Ely, seen as the gateway to the Boundary Waters Canoe Area Wilderness, developed a lively tourist trade, but due to environmental concerns the area there has been some controversy about a proposal to build a mining operation for copper just outside the BWCAW. The company involved, Twin Metals Minnesota, is operated by a Chilean company, Antofagasta PLC. It says it plans "to build modern mines that must go through a rigorous regulatory process before they can move forward", but environmentalists are concerned that runoff from the mining operation could damage the BWCA wilderness area. The copper deposits beneath the forests and lakes of northeastern Minnesota are encased in sulfide ore and when that is exposed it produces sulfuric acid, which has resulted in severe water pollution in copper mines in several western U.S. areas.

In October 2021, the Biden administration filed an application for a "mineral withdrawal" that will put a hold on the development of the mine proposal while the environmental impacts are studied. The Obama administration had launched a similar study, but 24 weeks into the 28-week study the newly elected Trump administration ended it, allowing the plans for the mining operation to continue. The completed study could lead to a 20-year ban on mining upstream from the BWCAW. The Trump mineral leases were judged illegal, and in January 2022 the Biden administration canceled two Twin Metals mineral leases. The Timberjay called the Biden administration's decision a "potentially fatal blow to [a] proposed copper-nickel mine."

=== Climate ===
Ely

Climate chart (precipitation, max. and min. temperature)
J	F	M	A	M	J	J	A	S	O	N	D
27 −9 −22	20 −5 −21	34 2 −12	58 10 −4	76 18 3	107 24 9	114 26 12	87 26 11	122 20 7	73 11 0	43 1 −7	34 −6 −16
- █ Average max. and min. temperatures in °C
- █ Precipitation totals in mm
Imperial conversion
J	F	M	A	M	J	J	A	S	O	N	D
1.1 15 −7	0.8 23 −5	1.3 36 10	2.3 51 25	3 65 38	4.2 75 49	4.5 79 53	3.4 78 52	4.8 68 44	2.9 52 32	1.7 35 19	1.3 21 3
- █ Average max. and min. temperatures in °F
- █ Precipitation totals in inches

On the Köppen climate classification, Ely falls in the warm summer humid continental climate zone (Dfb). Summertime is warm (sometimes hot) and wintertime is cold (sometimes severely) and drawn out, sometimes beginning in October and lasting well into April.

On February 13, 2021, Ely set a new daily record low for the city with an actual air temperature of -50F. This compares to the Minnesota record low temperature of -60F recorded near the town of Tower, MN on February 2, 1996.

Climate data for Ely, Minnesota, 1991–2020 normals, extremes 1998–present
Month	Jan	Feb	Mar	Apr	May	Jun	Jul	Aug	Sep	Oct	Nov	Dec	Year
Record high °F (°C)	47 (8)	62 (17)	76 (24)	81 (27)	94 (34)	97 (36)	99 (37)	97 (36)	93 (34)	84 (29)	72 (22)	51 (11)	99 (37)
Mean maximum °F (°C)	36.4 (2.4)	41.5 (5.3)	57.0 (13.9)	67.7 (19.8)	83.5 (28.6)	85.5 (29.7)	89.8 (32.1)	88.5 (31.4)	83.7 (28.7)	71.9 (22.2)	54.5 (12.5)	39.3 (4.1)	91.3 (32.9)
Mean daily maximum °F (°C)	15.2 (−9.3)	22.8 (−5.1)	36.3 (2.4)	50.6 (10.3)	65.2 (18.4)	75.4 (24.1)	78.9 (26.1)	77.9 (25.5)	67.6 (19.8)	51.6 (10.9)	34.5 (1.4)	20.7 (−6.3)	49.7 (9.8)
Daily mean °F (°C)	4.1 (−15.5)	9.0 (−12.8)	23.4 (−4.8)	38.0 (3.3)	51.6 (10.9)	62.1 (16.7)	66.1 (18.9)	65.1 (18.4)	55.7 (13.2)	42.0 (5.6)	26.5 (−3.1)	11.8 (−11.2)	37.9 (3.3)
Mean daily minimum °F (°C)	−6.9 (−21.6)	−4.9 (−20.5)	10.4 (−12.0)	25.4 (−3.7)	38.0 (3.3)	48.9 (9.4)	53.3 (11.8)	52.2 (11.2)	43.8 (6.6)	32.4 (0.2)	18.6 (−7.4)	2.9 (−16.2)	26.2 (−3.2)
Mean minimum °F (°C)	−29.2 (−34.0)	−28.3 (−33.5)	−17.6 (−27.6)	6.5 (−14.2)	26.3 (−3.2)	37.1 (2.8)	45.9 (7.7)	42.6 (5.9)	32.5 (0.3)	21.1 (−6.1)	−0.5 (−18.1)	−20.0 (−28.9)	−32.1 (−35.6)
Record low °F (°C)	−45 (−43)	−50 (−46)	−32 (−36)	−12 (−24)	22 (−6)	29 (−2)	38 (3)	30 (−1)	26 (−3)	5 (−15)	−16 (−27)	−39 (−39)	−50 (−46)
Average precipitation inches (mm)	1.06 (27)	0.79 (20)	1.34 (34)	2.27 (58)	2.99 (76)	4.23 (107)	4.50 (114)	3.41 (87)	4.82 (122)	2.87 (73)	1.70 (43)	1.32 (34)	31.30 (795)
Average snowfall inches (cm)	13.8 (35)	9.3 (24)	8.4 (21)	7.7 (20)	0.3 (0.76)	0.0 (0.0)	0.0 (0.0)	0.0 (0.0)	0.0 (0.0)	2.1 (5.3)	9.8 (25)	13.2 (34)	64.6 (164)
Average precipitation days (≥ 0.01 in)	11.4	9.1	8.6	9.5	14.0	14.9	12.6	11.1	12.2	14.4	10.0	11.4	139.2
Average snowy days (≥ 0.1 in)	12.1	8.7	5.7	3.2	0.4	0.0	0.0	0.0	0.0	2.1	6.8	11.7	50.7
Source: NOAA (mean maxima/minima 2006–2020)

== Demographics ==
Historical population
Census	Pop.	Note	%±
1890	901		—
1900	3,717		312.5%
1910	3,572		−3.9%
1920	4,902		37.2%
1930	6,156		25.6%
1940	5,970		−3.0%
1950	5,474		−8.3%
1960	5,438		−0.7%
1970	4,904		−9.8%
1980	4,820		−1.7%
1990	3,968		−17.7%
2000	3,724		−6.1%
2010	3,460		−7.1%
2020	3,268		−5.5%
U.S. Decennial Census

=== 2020 census ===
As of the 2020 census, Ely had a population of 3,268. The median age was 47.2 years. 15.4% of residents were under the age of 18 and 26.3% of residents were 65 years of age or older. For every 100 females there were 94.5 males, and for every 100 females age 18 and over there were 95.5 males age 18 and over.

0.0% of residents lived in urban areas, while 100.0% lived in rural areas.

There were 1,615 households in Ely, of which 17.1% had children under the age of 18 living in them. Of all households, 33.7% were married-couple households, 24.9% were households with a male householder and no spouse or partner present, and 34.2% were households with a female householder and no spouse or partner present. About 46.9% of all households were made up of individuals and 21.6% had someone living alone who was 65 years of age or older.

There were 1,961 housing units, of which 17.6% were vacant. The homeowner vacancy rate was 2.7% and the rental vacancy rate was 8.0%.

Racial composition as of the 2020 census
Race	Number	Percent
White	2,928	89.6%
Black or African American	131	4.0%
American Indian and Alaska Native	30	0.9%
Asian	18	0.6%
Native Hawaiian and Other Pacific Islander	1	0.0%
Some other race	25	0.8%
Two or more races	135	4.1%
Hispanic or Latino (of any race)	65	2.0%

=== 2010 census ===
As of the census of 2010, there were 3,460 people, 1,681 households, and 814 families residing in the city. The population density was 1,267.4 inhabitants per square mile (489.3/km^{2}). There were 2,022 housing units at an average density of 740.7 per square mile (286.0/km^{2}). The racial makeup of the city was 95.9% White, 1.0% African American, 0.8% Native American, 0.7% Asian, 0.1% from other races, and 1.6% from two or more races. Hispanic or Latino of any race were 1.1% of the population.

There were 1,681 households, of which 19.1% had children under the age of 18 living with them, 37.1% were married couples living together, 8.4% had a female householder with no husband present, 2.9% had a male householder with no wife present, and 51.6% were non-families. 45.3% of all households were made up of individuals, and 19.8% had someone living alone who was 65 years of age or older. The average household size was 1.93 and the average family size was 2.66.

The median age in the city was 45.3 years. 16% of residents were under the age of 18; 13.4% were between the ages of 18 and 24; 20.3% were from 25 to 44; 27.4% were from 45 to 64; and 22.9% were 65 years of age or older. The gender makeup of the city was 49.7% male and 50.3% female.

=== 2000 census ===
As of the census of 2000, there were 3,724 people, 1,912 households, and 916 families residing in the city. The population density was 1,369.5 inhabitants per square mile (528.8/km^{2}). There were 1,912 housing units at an average density of 703.2 per square mile (271.5/km^{2}). The racial makeup of the city was 96.86% White, 0.86% African American, 0.54% Native American, 0.19% Asian, 0.30% from other races, and 1.26% from two or more races. Hispanic or Latino of any race were 0.67% of the population. 21.8% were of German, 12.2% Slovene, 11.7% Finnish, 8.7% Norwegian, 6.4% English, 5.6% Swedish and 5.4% Polish ancestry.

There were 1,912 households, out of which 21.4% had children under the age of 18 living with them, 41.6% were married couples living together, 8.4% had a female householder with no husband present, and 45.9% were non-families. 39.0% of all households were made up of individuals, and 21.1% had someone living alone who was 65 years of age or older. The average household size was 2.05 and the average family size was 2.72.

In the city, the population was spread out, with 17.8% under the age of 18, 16.2% from 18 to 24, 21.6% from 25 to 44, 22.9% from 45 to 64, and 21.6% who were 65 years of age or older. The median age was 41 years. For every 100 females, there were 101.0 males. For every 100 females age 18 and over, there were 102.6 males.

The median income for a household in the city was $27,615, and the median income for a family was $36,047. Males had a median income of $34,559 versus $18,833 for females. The per capita income for the city was $16,855. About 9.5% of families and 14.5% of the population were below the poverty line, including 10.9% of those under age 18 and 12.5% of those age 65 or over.

== Politics ==
United States presidential election results for Ely, Minnesota
Year	Republican		Democratic		Third party(ies)	
Year	No.	%	No.	%	No.	%
1960	806	26.40%	2,238	73.30%	9	0.29%
1964	552	19.11%	2,328	80.58%	9	0.31%
1968	637	23.40%	1,995	73.29%	90	3.31%
1972	1,157	41.31%	1,598	57.05%	46	1.64%
1976	897	30.78%	1,934	66.37%	83	2.85%
1980	1,079	35.85%	1,774	58.94%	157	5.22%
1984	817	30.77%	1,838	69.23%	0	0.00%
1988	686	29.85%	1,612	70.15%	0	0.00%
1992	544	23.93%	1,171	51.52%	558	24.55%
1996	580	27.17%	1,258	58.92%	297	13.91%
2000	842	39.13%	1,109	51.53%	201	9.34%
2004	940	42.75%	1,225	55.71%	34	1.55%
2008	827	39.10%	1,236	58.44%	52	2.46%
2012	808	39.59%	1,148	56.25%	85	4.16%
2016	925	48.38%	799	41.79%	188	9.83%
2020	1,006	49.95%	962	47.77%	46	2.28%
2024	982	47.26%	1,049	50.48%	47	2.26%

== Arts and culture ==
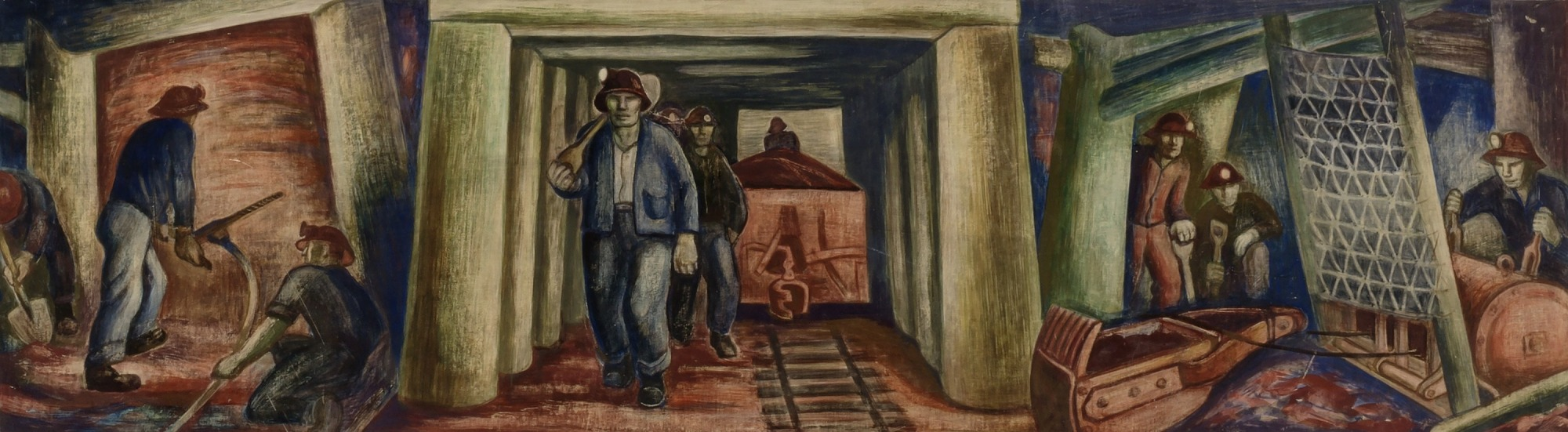

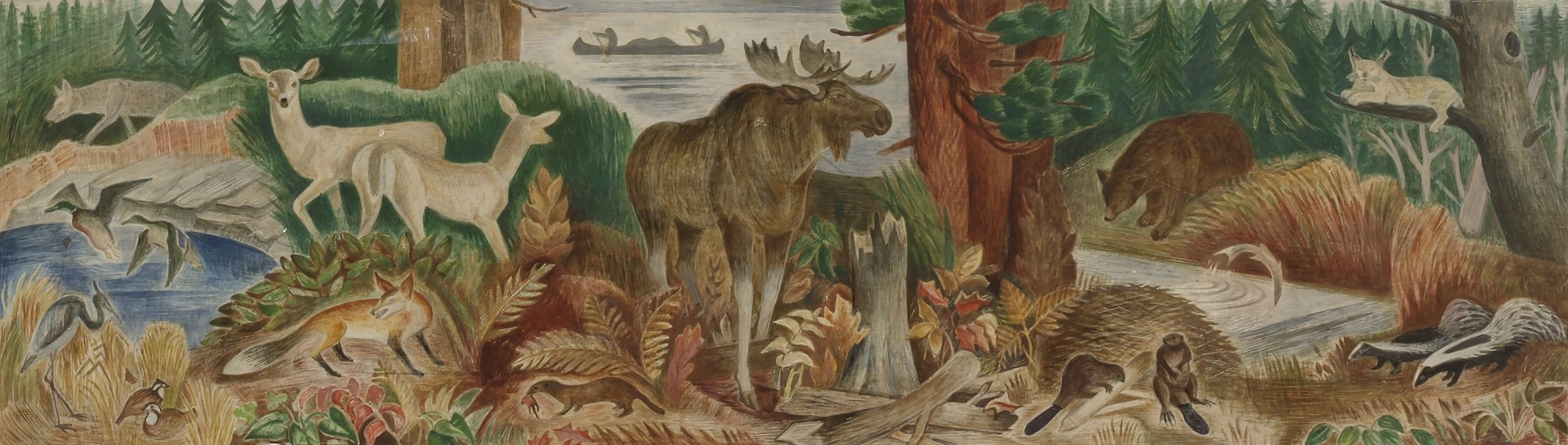
Elsa Jemne's studies for Iron-Ore Mines and Wilderness, two murals at the United States Post Office in Ely

Ely hosts many community events in Whiteside Park, such as the Blueberry Arts Festival in July, the Harvest Moon Festival in September, and the Winter Festival in February. There is also an Ely-only artist gallery, Art & Soul Gallery.

Ely's post office contains two tempera-on-plaster murals, Iron-Ore Mines and Wilderness, painted by Elsa Jemne in 1941. Federally commissioned post office murals were produced during the New Deal through the Section of Painting and Sculpture, later called the Section of Fine Arts, of the Treasury Department.

=== North American Bear Center ===
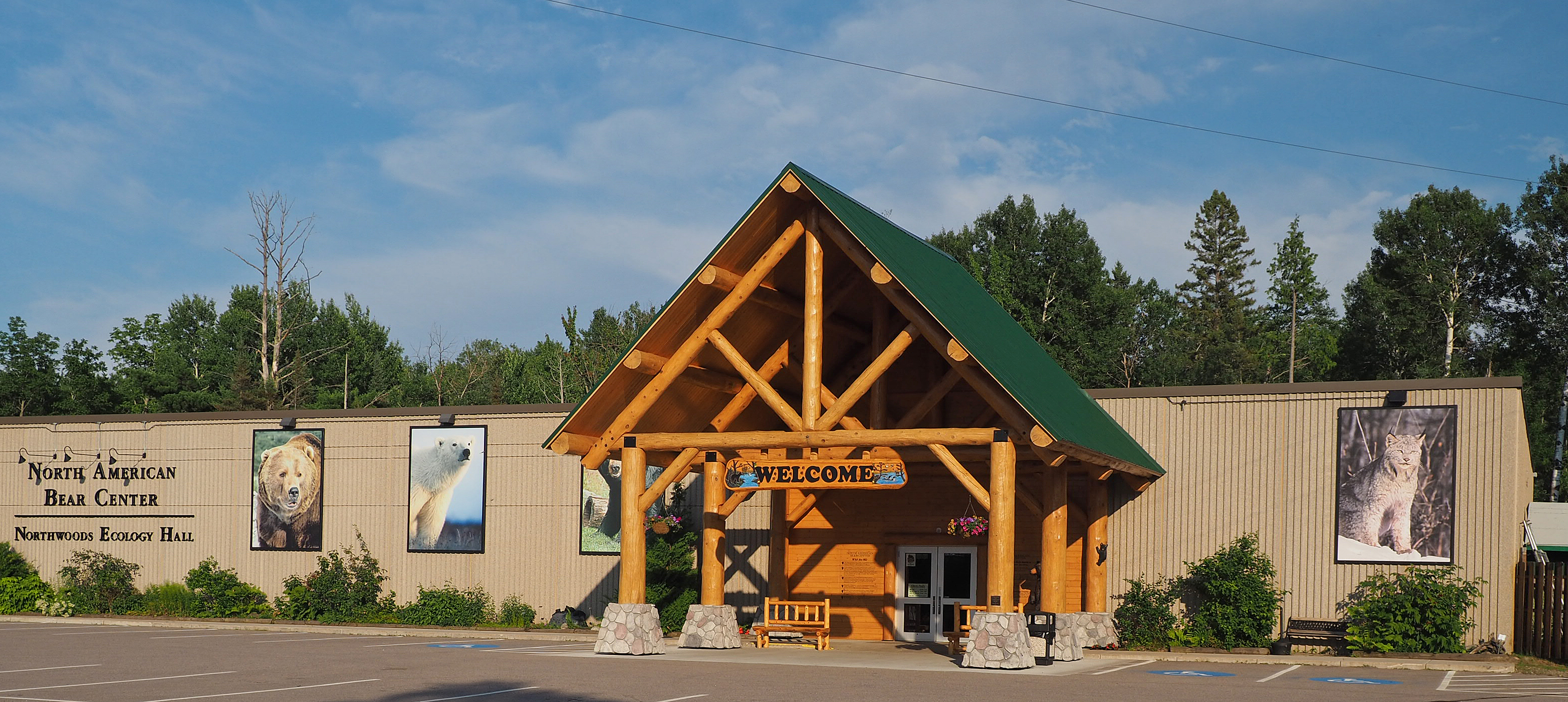
The North American Bear Center

Ely is home to the North American Bear Center, which opened in 2007. It is an interactive museum and educational facility featuring American black bears. The center, the only science/nature museum of its kind, is dedicated to helping people learn from the bears themselves about bear behavior, ecology, and their relations with humans. A wall of windows overlooks a 2.5-acre naturally forested enclosure with a pond and waterfalls, which is home to four resident bears. There are also exhibits, a theater, children's activities, and interpretive nature trails.

=== International Wolf Center ===
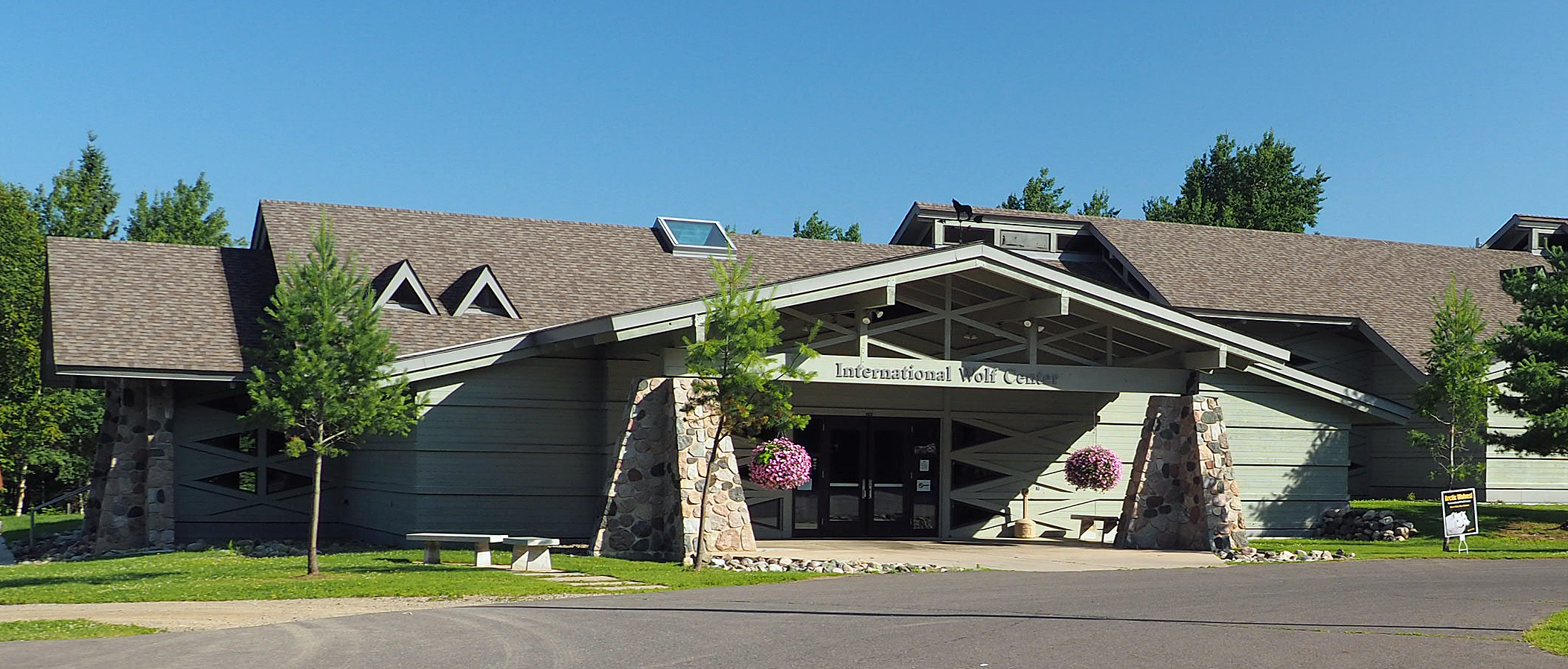
International Wolf Center

The International Wolf Center is one of the world's leading organizations dedicated to educating people about wolves. Founded in 1985 by a group of biologists led by L. David Mech, a world-renowned wolf biologist, it opened in 1993. The center features gray wolves viewable through large windows that allow visitors to watch them communicate, play, hunt and eat. In addition to the onsite ambassador wolves, the center offers a variety of educational programs at its Ely interpretive facility and other locations in northern Minnesota and across North America. Afternoon, weekend and weeklong programs include howling trips, radio tracking, snowshoe treks, family activities, dogsledding, videos, presentations, flights over wolf country, demonstrations, and hikes.

=== Arts & Heritage Center ===
The Ely Arts & Heritage Center is in the historic Pioneer Mine complex. It is managed by a nonprofit arts organization, Ely Greenstone Public Art. It offers classes, exhibits, and festivals.

=== Dorothy Molter museum ===
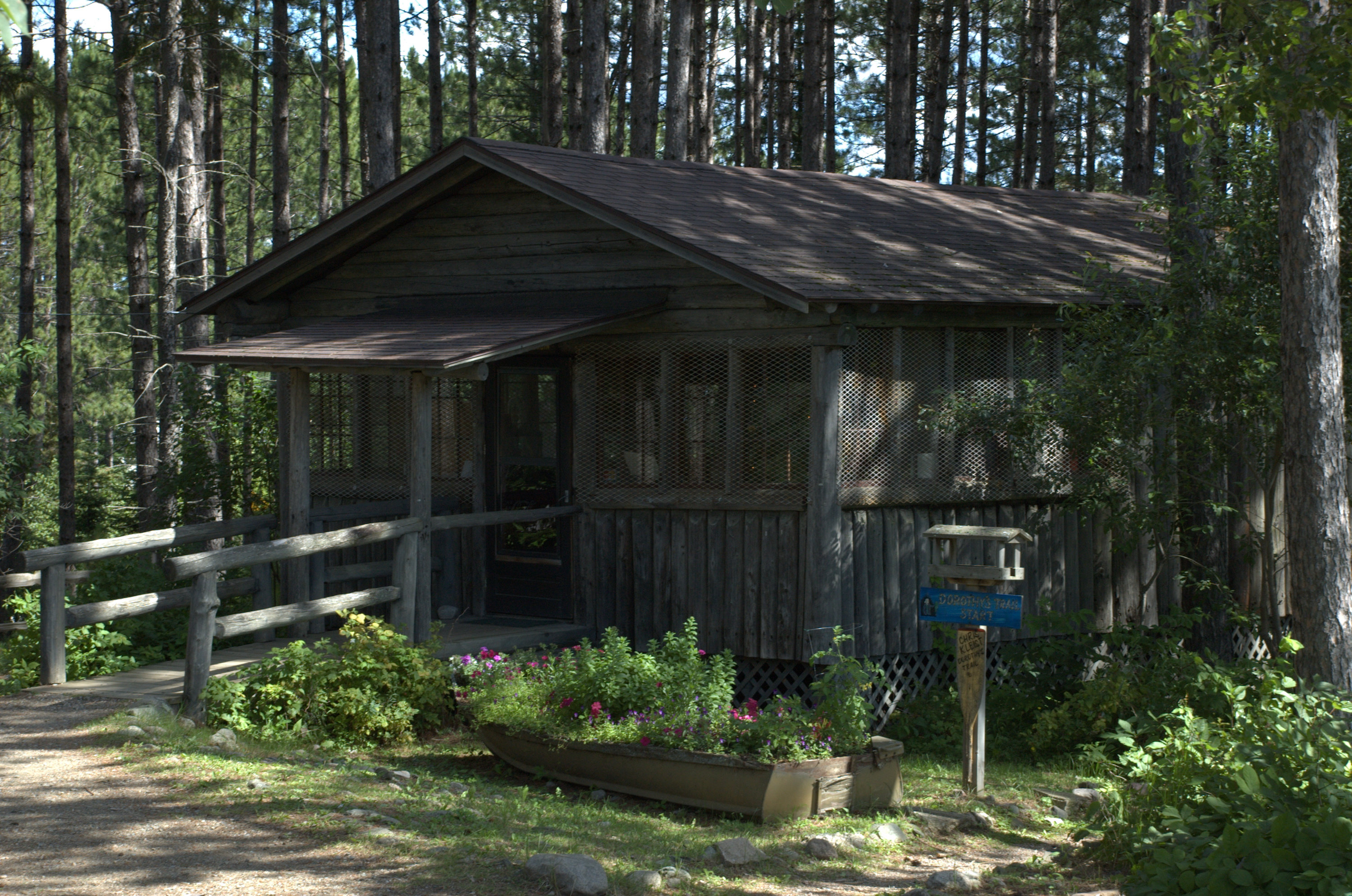
The Dorothy Molter cabin in Ely

The Dorothy Molter cabin and museum are in Ely. Known as the "Root Beer Lady", Molter lived for 56 years on Knife Lake in the BWCAW. She gradually gained national prominence and extensive coverage in media, books and documentaries, and over the years tens of thousands of canoeists stopped by to visit and drink her homemade root beer. Molter was born May 6, 1907, in Pennsylvania, but was quickly separated from her family and raised in an orphanage. She first visited her future home (The Isle of Pines Resort) on Knife Lake in 1930 and it became her home in 1934 after falling in love with the area. Until the mid/late 1940s, the Isle of Pines resort was typical of many north woods resorts. It was reachable by seaplanes and motorboats, and later by snowmobiles as they came into use.

After a 1949 flight ban Molter began importing her supplies for root beer by boat and reusing glass bottles that she stored in a shed. Canoeists stopping by would be asked to bring supplies from town and would commonly leave an oar behind, hundreds of which are still on display at the museum. Molter's land was taken from her in the 1964 Wilderness Act, however, after a nationwide uproar and her friends protesting, she was allowed to temporarily stay as long as the resort was closed down. Along with Molters land being taken, nearly all motorized transportation to Molter's lodge was eliminated, residences, buildings, business and the few roads from the wilderness were removed, leaving Molter as the only full-time resident in a wilderness area three times the size of Rhode Island. Later she was given a lifetime pardon to live in her home. After her death, her multiple cabins, all her belongings, and other parts of her residence were dismantled and moved to Ely by boat. They were all then reconstructed there, and the Dorothy Molter Museum was established, and to this day sells her root beer to preserve her legacy.

=== Ely-Winton History Museum ===
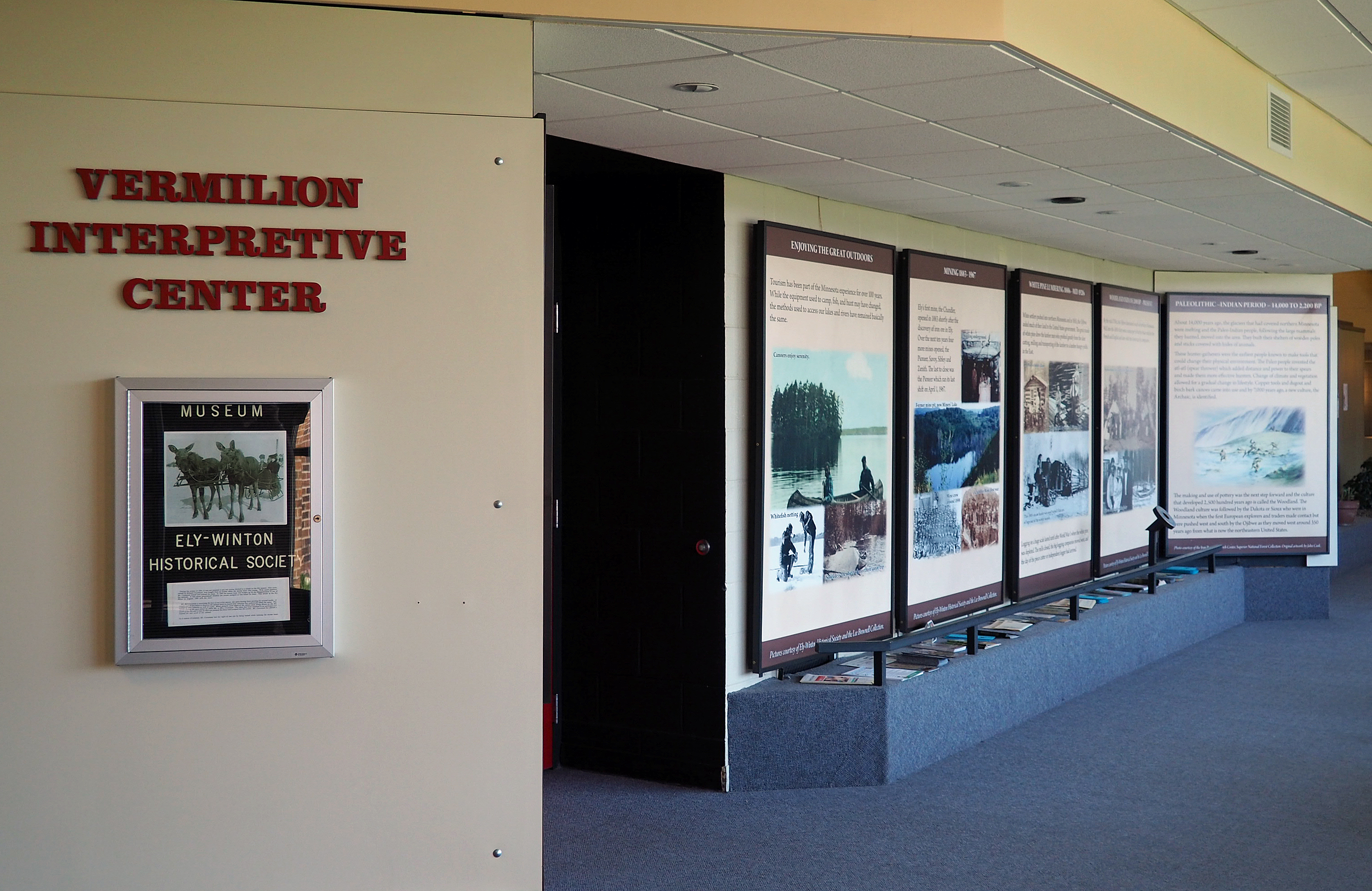
Ely-Winton History Museum

The Ely-Winton History Museum is on the Vermilion Community College Campus. It depicts local history through displays, photographs, and oral histories. Logging and mining histories are told using geological samples and old logging and mining tools. Examples of past businesses are demonstrated as well as the importance of women on the frontier. In 2018 the museum opened an exhibit of paintings representative of Ely mining history, featuring the works of Albin Zaverl. It also has a collection of the work done by Ojibwe artist Carl Gawboy, who grew up in Ely. The museum offers programs about the history of the area twice a month during the summer. The museum mission statement reads:

The mission depicts local history through artifacts, photographs, oral histories, numerous videos/DVDs; displays include Ojibwe, fur trade, mining, logging, immigration, voyageurs, and Footprints Across The Wilderness, the history of the Boundary Waters Canoe Area Wilderness with a new exhibit each summer. They cover the history of the area from prehistoric times through mining, immigration and logging. Arts displays include Carl Gawboy and Albin Zaverl.

=== Historically significant structures in and around Ely ===
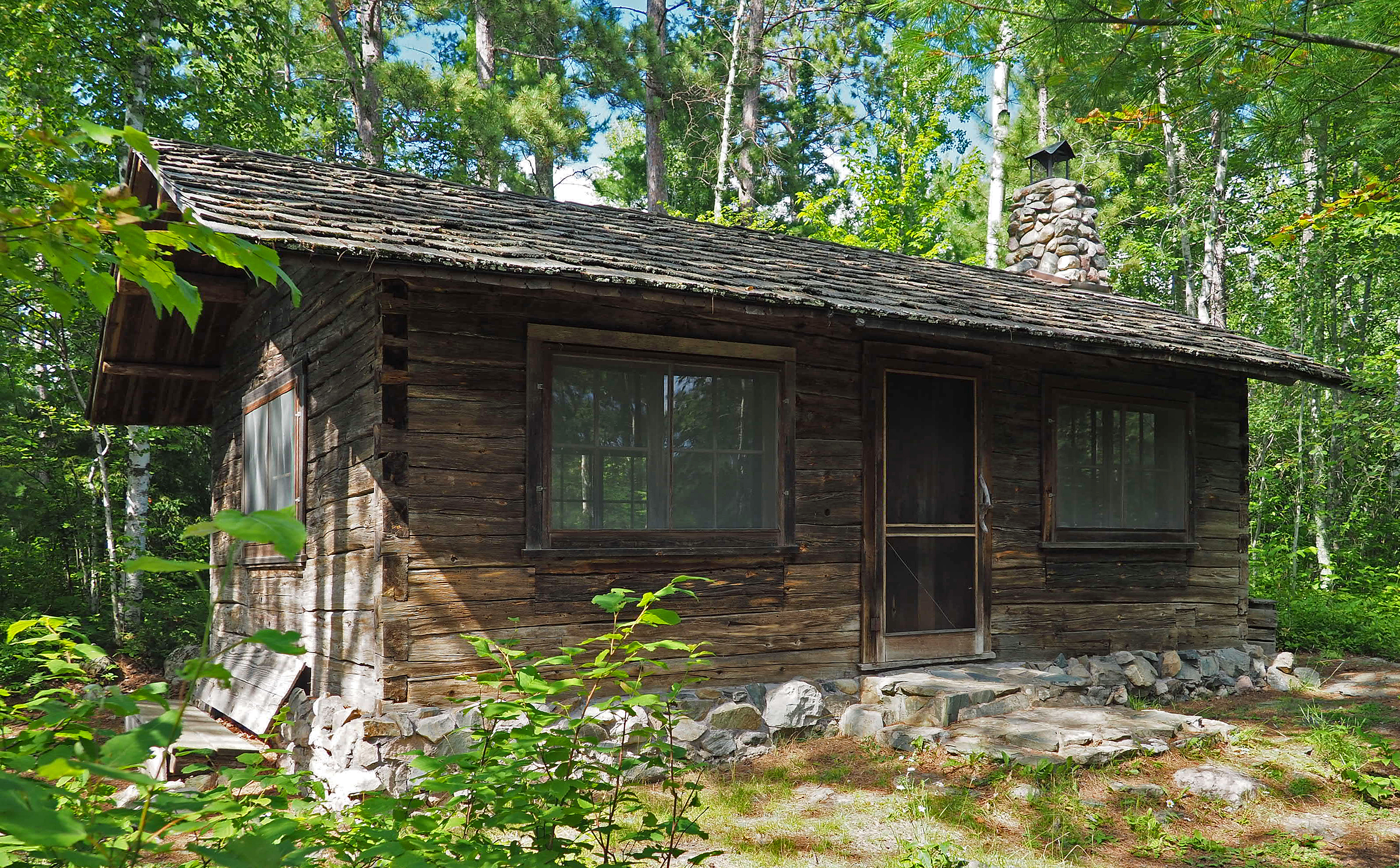
Listening Point cabin

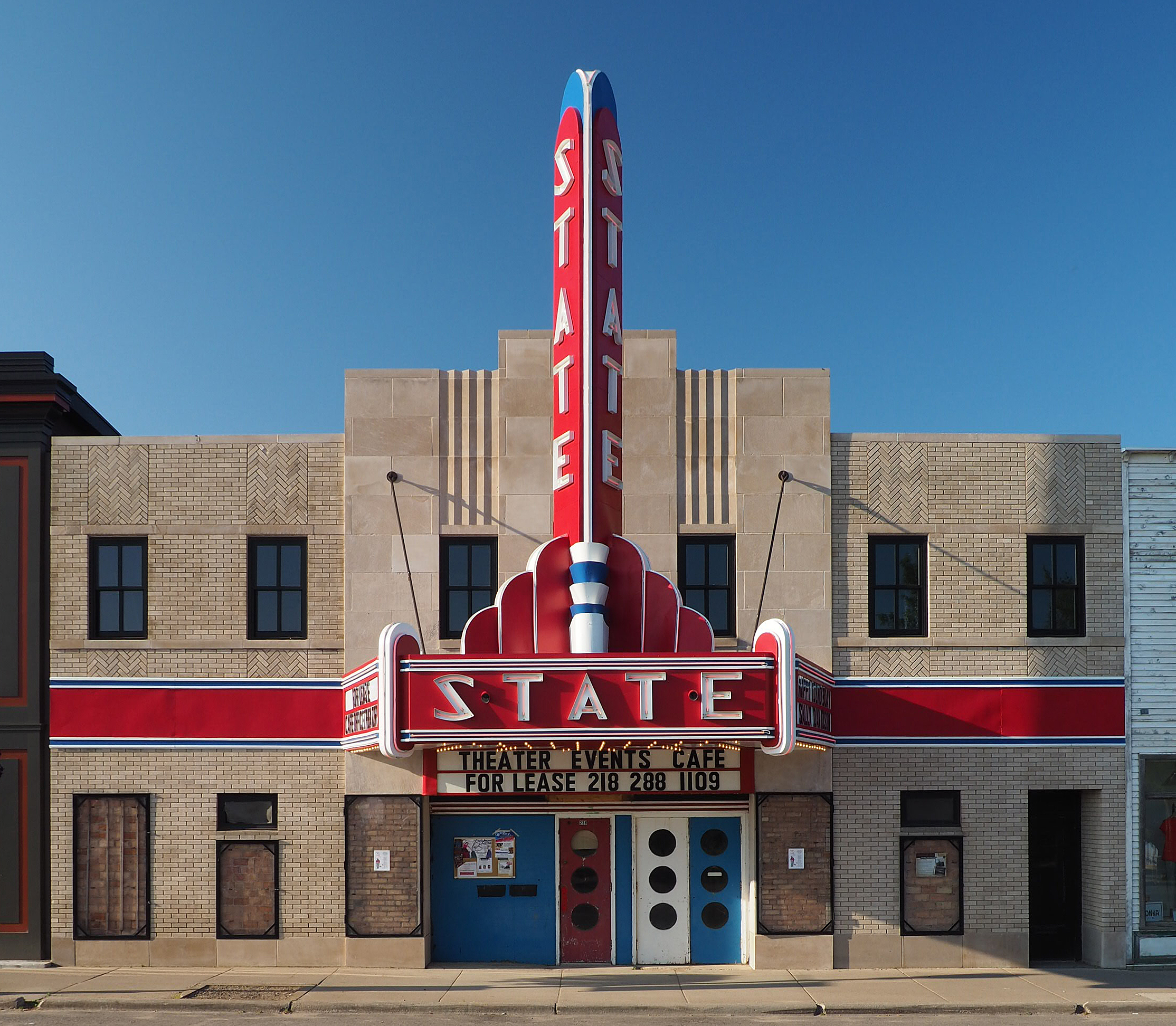
Ely State Theater

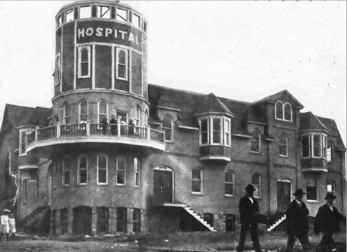
Tanner's Hospital -1907

The U.S. National Register of Historic Places deems certain structures worthy of preservation for their historical significance. Several sites in and around Ely have been placed on the Register's list: Bull-of-the-Woods Logging Scow, Ely State Theater, Listening Point, and Tanner's Hospital.

Listening Point was the private retreat of conservationist Sigurd Olson on Burntside Lake. Olson acquired the property in 1956, then purchased a log cabin and a log sauna elsewhere that he had dismantled, moved to Listening Point, and reassembled. In 1998 the Listening Point Foundation was organized to preserve the property as an open-air museum to Olson.

The Ely State Theater is a 1936 Streamline Moderne design, epitomizing the small-town commissions of leading regional theater designers, Minneapolis architects Liebenberg & Kaplan.

Tanner's Hospital is a former hospital building built in 1901 as a moneymaking enterprise due to the area's high disease rate, a consequence of low investment in sanitation infrastructure in the mining boom towns of the Iron Range, where the long-term existence of any given community was unpredictable.

The Bull-of-the-Woods Logging Scow is a small paddle steamer wrecked in Burntside Lake. It was built around 1893 for one of the lumber companies in the area. There were at least a few of these vessels, locally known as "alligators" or "gators", in operation in northeastern Minnesota in the late 19th and early 20th centuries. They could tow timber rafts, hoist logs, navigate shallow waters, and even pull themselves across dry land. It is the only known surviving example of its type.

== Parks and recreation ==
There are many Minnesota wilderness hiking trails in the Ely area. Echo Trail (Saint Louis County Road 116), considered one of Minnesota's most scenic trails, is a former logging road that runs north and west out of Ely and provides the primary access to the lakes of the western BWCAW. The trail is a 72-mile (116-km) road on asphalt and gravel through the wilderness of the Superior National Forest and Kabetogama State Forest.

Trezona Trail offers historic views of the old iron ore mining operations that first brought new immigrants to the area.

The Kekekabic Trail, commonly called "The Kek", is a hiking trail that runs about 39 miles, beginning in Ely and ending at the Gunflint Trail.

A paved biking trail, the Mesabi Trail, begins in Ely and stretches across the Mesabi Iron Range ending in Grand Rapids, a distance of approximately 120 miles.

In 2015, the Ely Marathon began, sending runners from the north side of Burntside Lake down the Echo Trail and into the city. It has become an annual event and grown to include several races. The marathon is known as the world's only marathon with a "canoe portage" category and holds the world record time for a marathon-length canoe portage.

=== Attractions ===
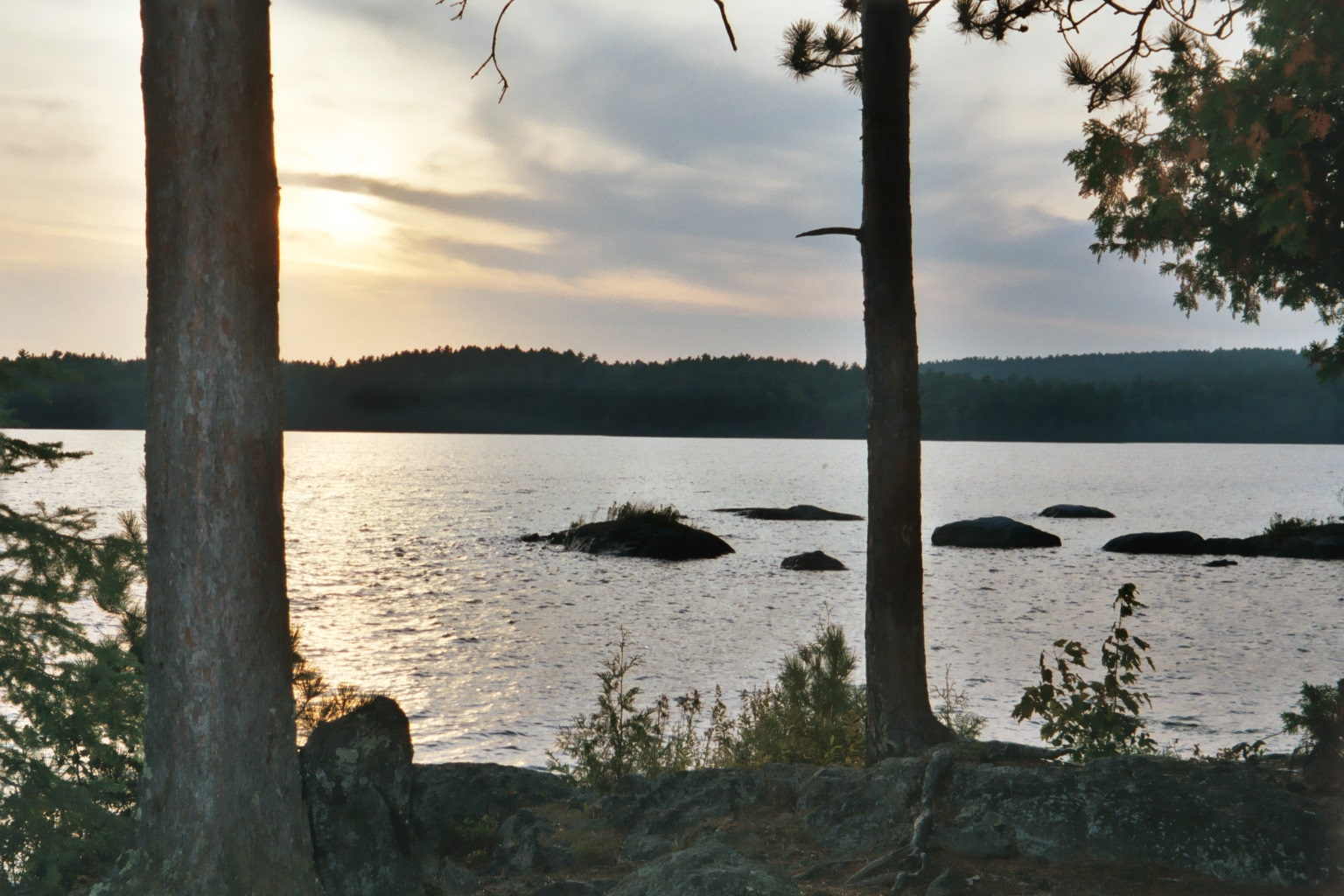
Burntside Lake, Ely, Minnesota

Ely is the largest "jumping off" town for the Boundary Waters Canoe Area Wilderness and a major one for Quetico Provincial Park. The BWCAW is renowned as a destination for canoeing and fishing on its many lakes.

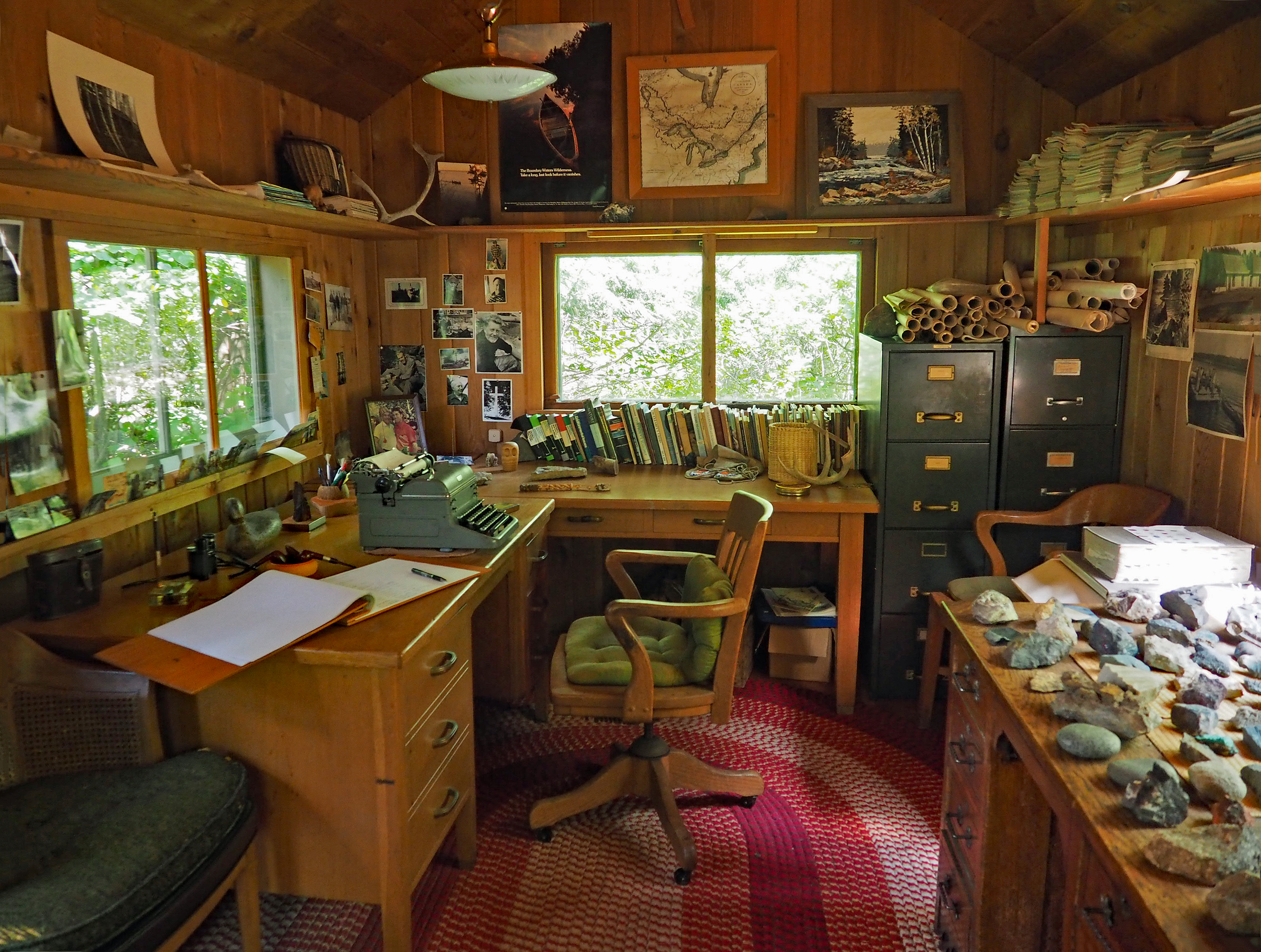
Sigurd F. Olson Writing Shack interior, Ely, Minnesota

Longtime Ely resident Sigurd F. Olson was instrumental in creating the BWCAW. A writer, environmentalist, and advocate for the protection of wilderness, he served for more than 30 years as a wilderness guide in the lakes and forests of the Quetico-Superior country of northern Minnesota and northwestern Ontario. He worked for the protection of the Boundary Waters, helped draft the Wilderness Act of 1964, and helped establish Voyageurs National Park in northern Minnesota. He was known honorifically as the Bourgeois—a term the voyageurs used for trusted leaders.

=== Outfitters ===
Ely Minnesota is considered to be one of the main gateways to the American side of the BWCAW. Because of this it is estimated that 250,000 people visit Ely Minnesota a year to enter the backcountry . To handle all of the people, Ely houses 20 outfitters. Outfitters are companies that provide gear and information for visitors because not everyone can afford or store their own gear, nor do they know all the information necessary. Some specialize in shorter day trips, some do weeks long, and some even provide guides.

=== Camp Widjiwagan ===
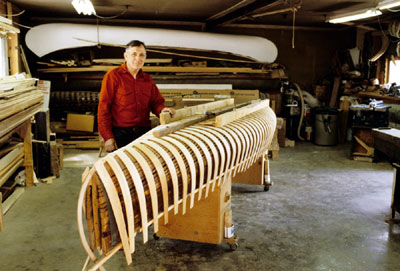
Joe Seliga in his Ely, Minnesota, workshop

Camp Widjiwagan is a wilderness camp for girls and boys on Burntside Lake. The camp is nationally recognized for its canoeing and backpacking programs; it also has an environmental education program, the Widjiwagan Outdoor Learning Program. During the summer it runs canoe and backpacking programs offered at several degrees of experience, with more advanced trips for experienced campers. Environmental education programs are held during the fall, winter and spring, with students studying wilderness survival, plant and tree identification, basic hiking skills, animal tracking, the night sky, snowshoeing, and cross-country skiing. Master builder of wood-and-canvas canoes Joe Seliga lived in Ely and was an instructor at the camp. When he died in 2005, Camp Widjiwagan received his canoe form.

=== Hegman Lake pictographs ===
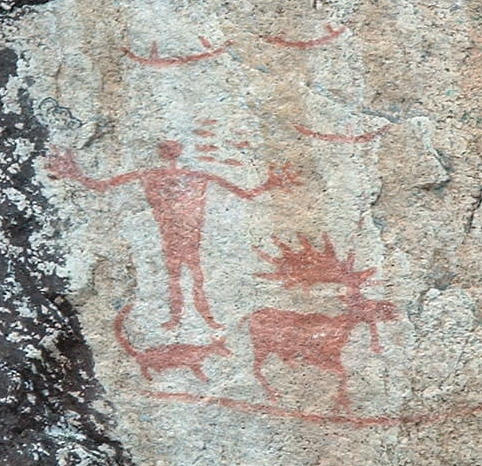
Hegman Lake Pictographs

The Hegman Lake Pictographs, within the BWCAW about 15 miles north of Ely, have been called "perhaps the most visited and photogenic pictograph within the State of Minnesota." On a large overlooking rock wall on North Hegman Lake, this ancient rock art is believed to have been created by the Ojibwe. The painting's meaning is uncertain. It appears to represent the Ojibwe meridian constellations visible in winter during the early evening. While some anthropologists believe the pictographs may have served as a guide for navigating in the deep woods during the winter hunting season, others see it as a visual representation of the connection between the spiritual and temporal worlds. In the summer the site can be reached only by canoe. In the winter, when the lakes are frozen, it can be reached by foot, with snowshoes if the snow is deep.

== Education ==
The Ely Public School District, which covers all of the municipality, includes two public schools: Ely Memorial High School (Grades 6–12) and Washington Elementary School (Grades Pre-K-5). Ely is home to Minnesota North College – Vermilion, formerly named Vermilion Community College.

Ely has a public library, the Ely Public Library, which is part of the Arrowhead Library System. Originally housed in the Ely Community Center, the library moved to a new, separate facility in 2014.

== Media ==
Ely is served by two community-oriented newspapers, the Ely Echo and the North Country Angler, and a radio station, WELY.

== Notable people ==
- Jessica Biel – actress, born in Ely
- Thomas A. Brown (1889–1959) – notoriously corrupt police chief of St. Paul, Minnesota, during both Prohibition and the Public Enemies era. Infamous as a conspirator in multiple felonies committed by the Dillinger Gang and the Barker-Karpis Gang. After successfully evading prosecution, Brown settled in Ely as a liquor store owner.
- Jim Brandenburg – photographer with National Geographic
- Jim Klobuchar – journalist, father of U.S. Senator Amy Klobuchar
- Lynn Rogers – black bear expert
- Patrick Roger Vail - Minnesota politician and businessman

== Famous hoaxes ==
People from Ely, with the support (and often assistance) of the city council, have created various hoaxes as a way of garnering free publicity for the city. One was that of a fictional family that "paints the leaves" of trees every fall. The fictional family was retiring from the business, and wanted people to send in a "color application" if they wanted to help carry out the tradition. Previously, a story was released about Ely seceding from the United States to be part of Canada. Both hoaxes were featured on Ely's Chamber Of Commerce website, www.ely.org.

In 2009, Ely made a tongue-in-cheek international bid to host the 2016 Olympics, with a man allegedly already employed with a bucket to drain Miner's Lake south of town in order to provide stadium seating. This hoax became widely known throughout Minnesota, and was often reported on radio stations. Shirts, bumper stickers, signs, and even interstate billboards bearing the slogan "Ely in 2016" became commonplace throughout the state.
