= Lynn Rogers =

Lynn Rogers may refer to:

- Lynn Rogers (biologist)
- Lynn Rogers (politician)
