= Brandon Auditorium and Fire Hall =

- U.S. National Register of Historic Places
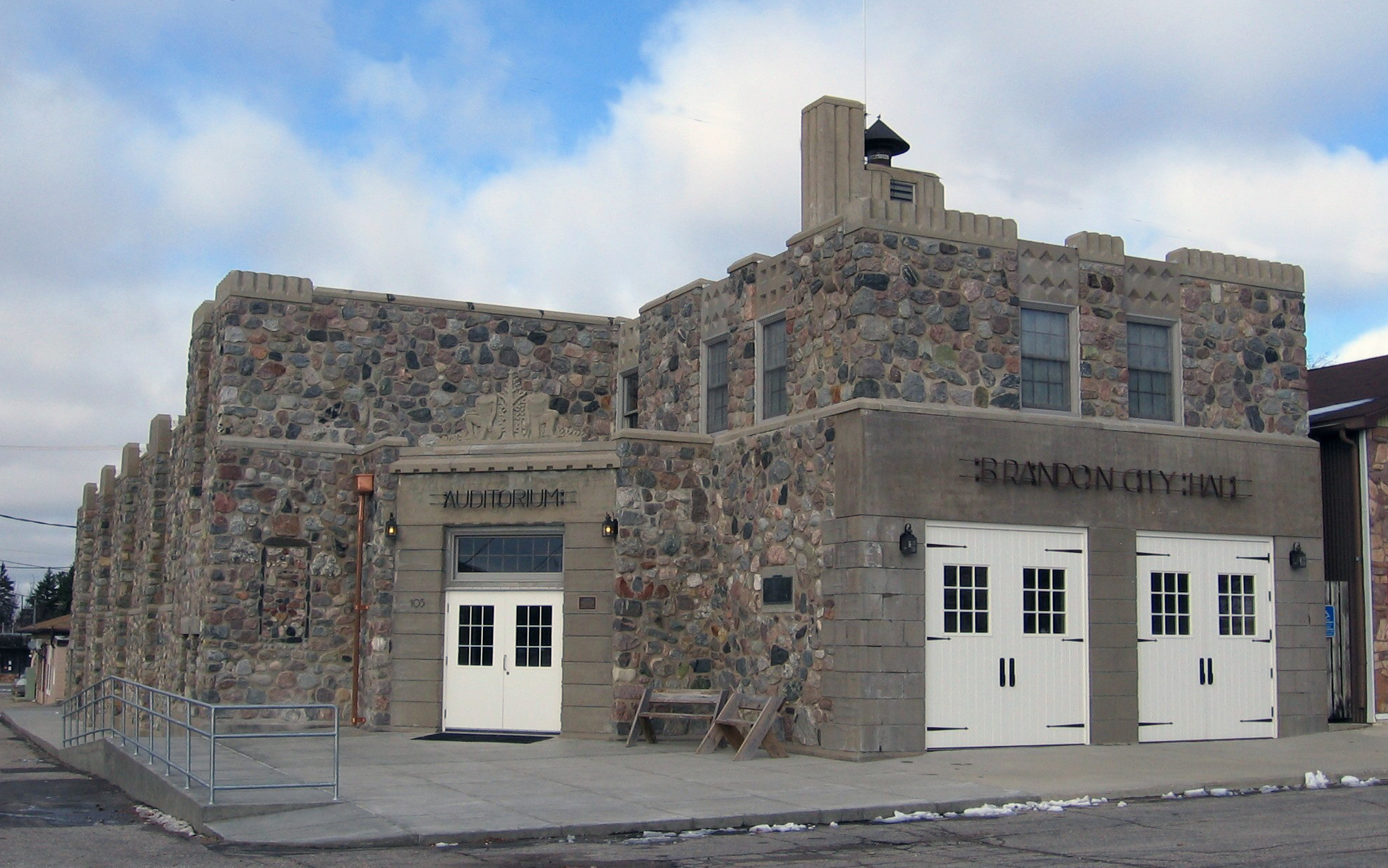

- Location within Minnesota
- Location: 105 Holmes Avenue, Brandon, Minnesota
- Coordinates: 45°57′52″N 95°35′52″W
- Area: less than one acre
- Built: 1935-36
- Built by: Works Progress Administration
- Architect: F. Boes Pfeifer
- NRHP reference No.: 85001928
- Added to NRHP: August 29, 1985

Brandon History Center

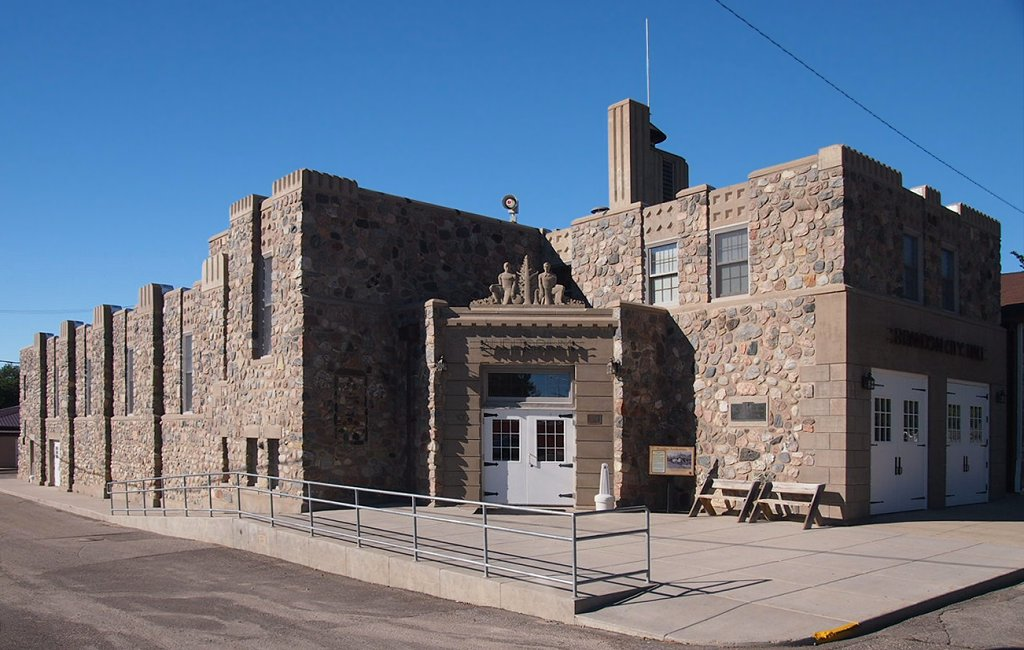
- Building in 2013
- Established: 2006
- Location: 105 Holmes Avenue, Brandon, Minnesota
- Type: Local History
- Website: brandonhistorycenter.org

The Brandon Auditorium and Fire Hall, on Holmes Ave. in Brandon, Minnesota, is a historic fire station and other facility. It has also been known as the Brandon Auditorium and City Hall. It was built as a Works Progress Administration project during 1935–36. It was listed on the National Register of Historic Places in 1985.

The municipal hall has been described as Minnesota's most creative WPA construction project and a symbol of its dual success in generating jobs and public buildings.

It was designed by Minneapolis architect F. Boes Pfeifer to serve as a combination gymnasium/auditorium, fire hall, and village office. It had a 27 feet (8.2 m) stage, and a balcony with a movie projection booth. The Brandon Auditorium was completed in 1936 and formally dedicated in October of that year with a crowd of 5,000 in attendance.

== Current use and restoration ==
The building is still used for many purposes today, and serves as home to the Brandon History Center. The two-stall fire engine garage has been no longer operational since the 1970s. By the 2000s the building needed both upgrading and significant restoration work. New windows had been added in 1991. Restoration work began in 2008 and included a new heating and air conditioning system, replacement of exterior doors with historically accurate ones, tuck pointing and waterproofing the exterior walls, masonry cleaning and stabilizing, chimney repair, and railing repair.

== WPA artworks ==
The building features several WPA Federal Art Projects including a cast concrete relief sculpture of a male athlete and a musician flanking a stylized tree watching guard over the main entrance and two large wooden relief carvings frame the auditorium stage by artist Joseph Bergman. Artist Elsa Laubach Jemne created a large mural painting originally for the city council room. The mural is now on display in the building's auditorium. Elsa was commissioned to do several new deal mural projects around Minnesota and three of her works are in the Smithsonian American Art Museum.

== Gallery Restoration work ==
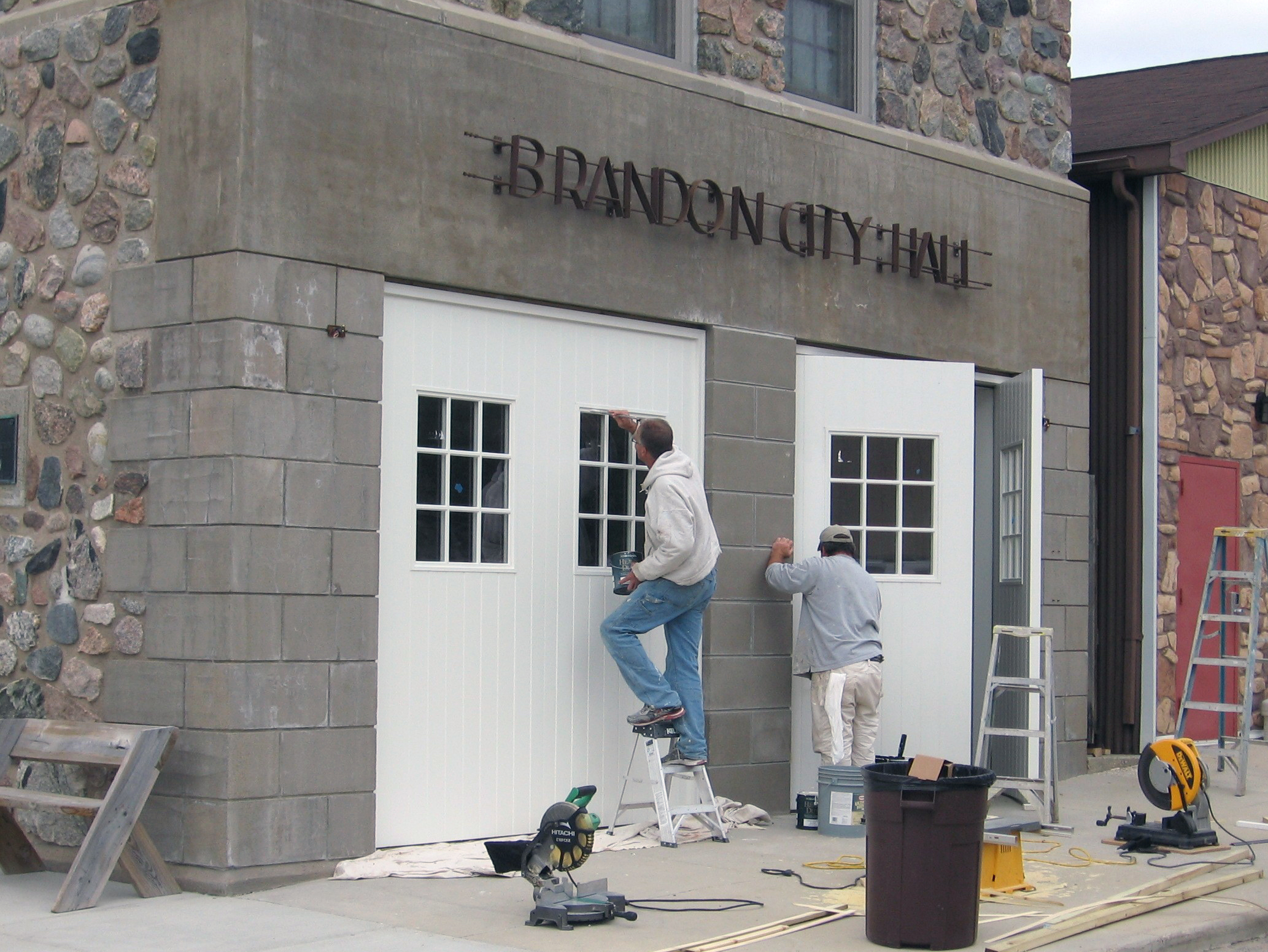
Addition of period doors

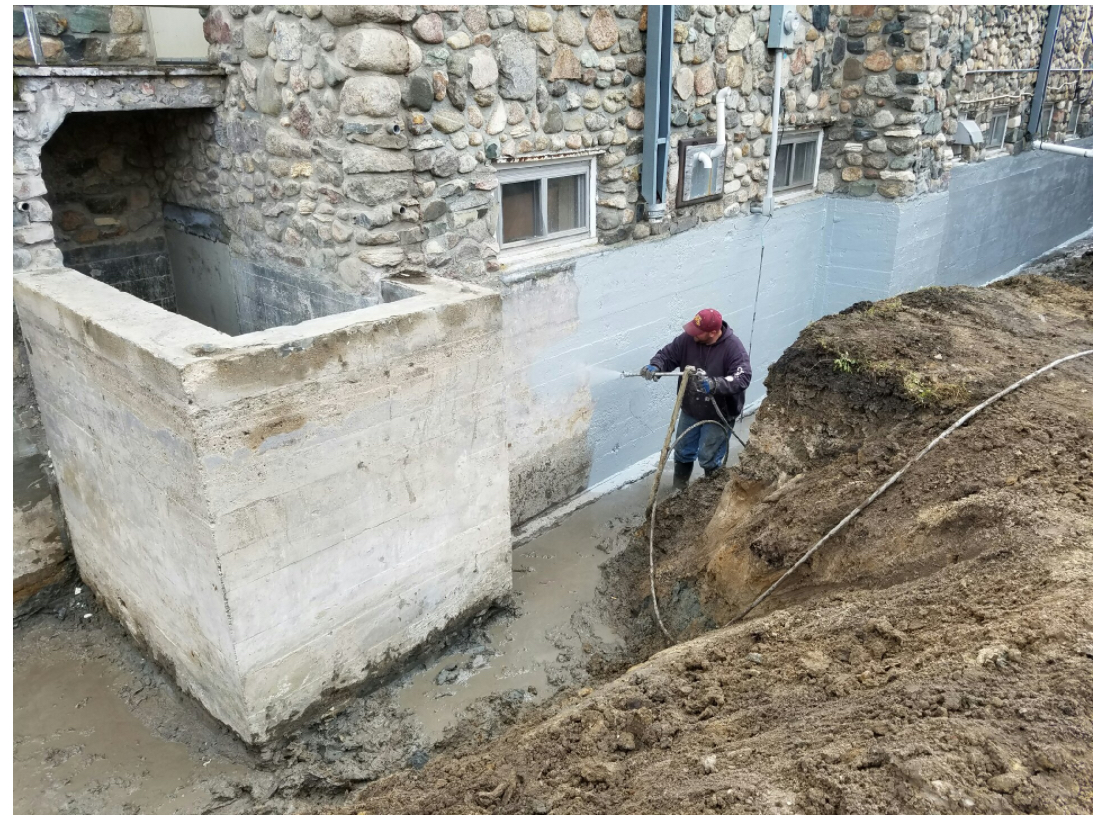
Waterproofing work on foundation

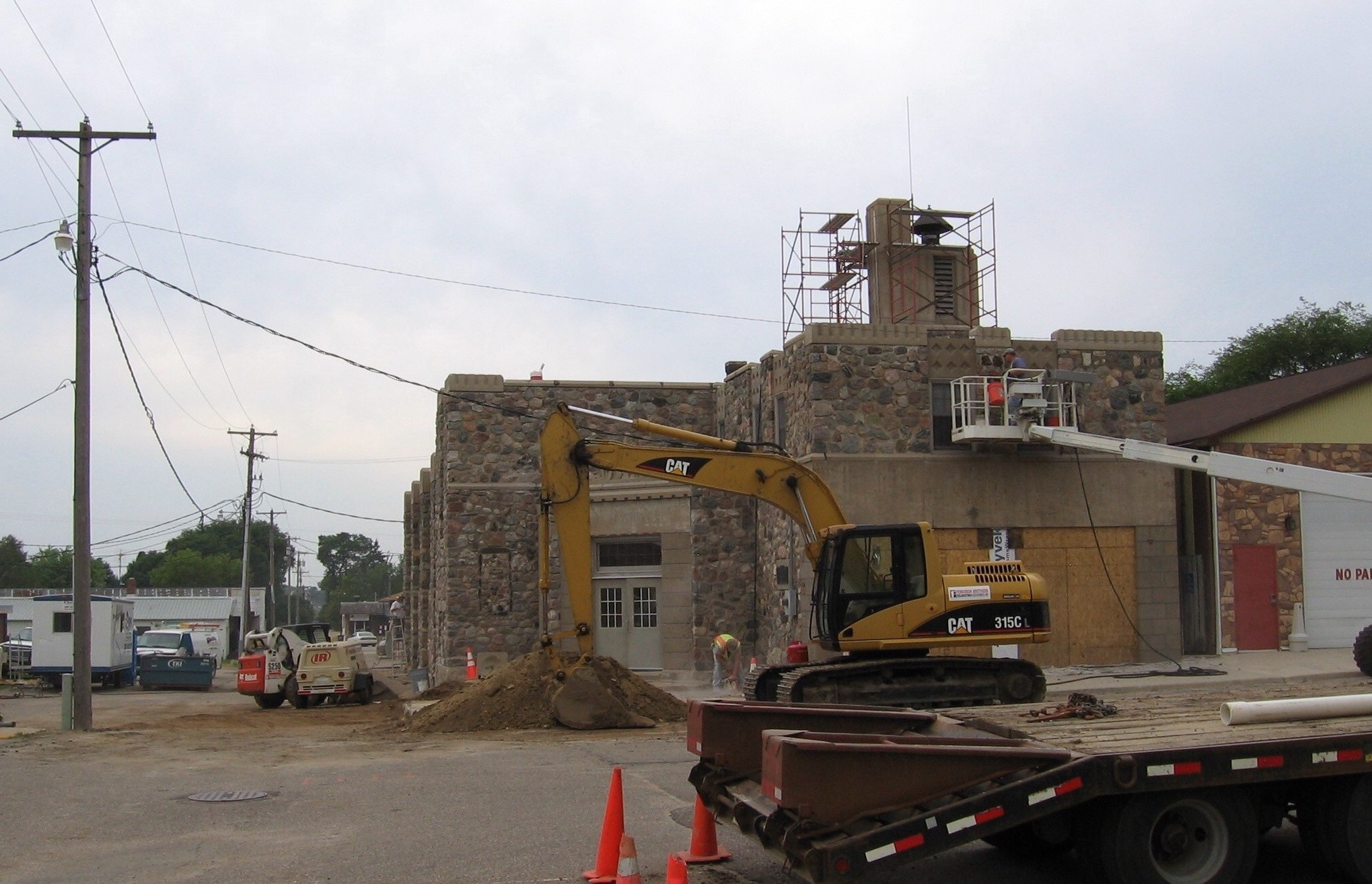
Tuck pointing work on exterior

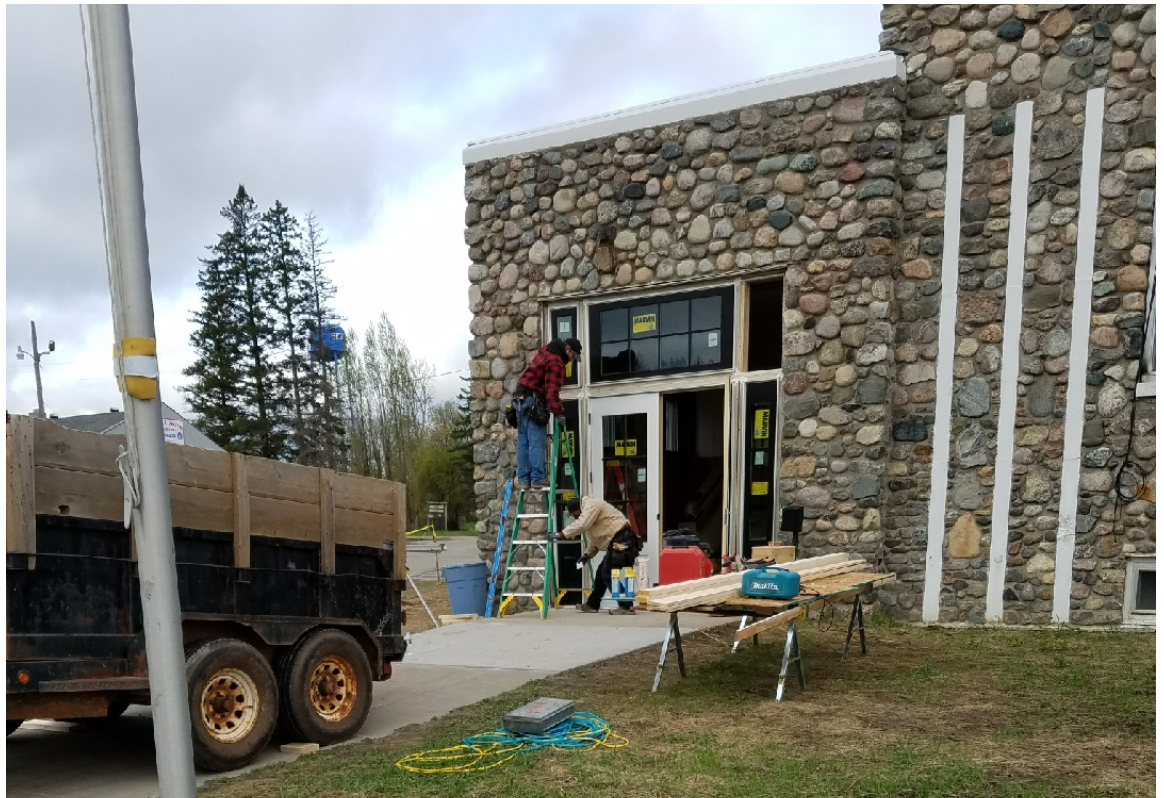
Installation of entryway doors

== See also ==
- List of museums in Minnesota
