= Ely Community Center =

- U.S. National Register of Historic Places
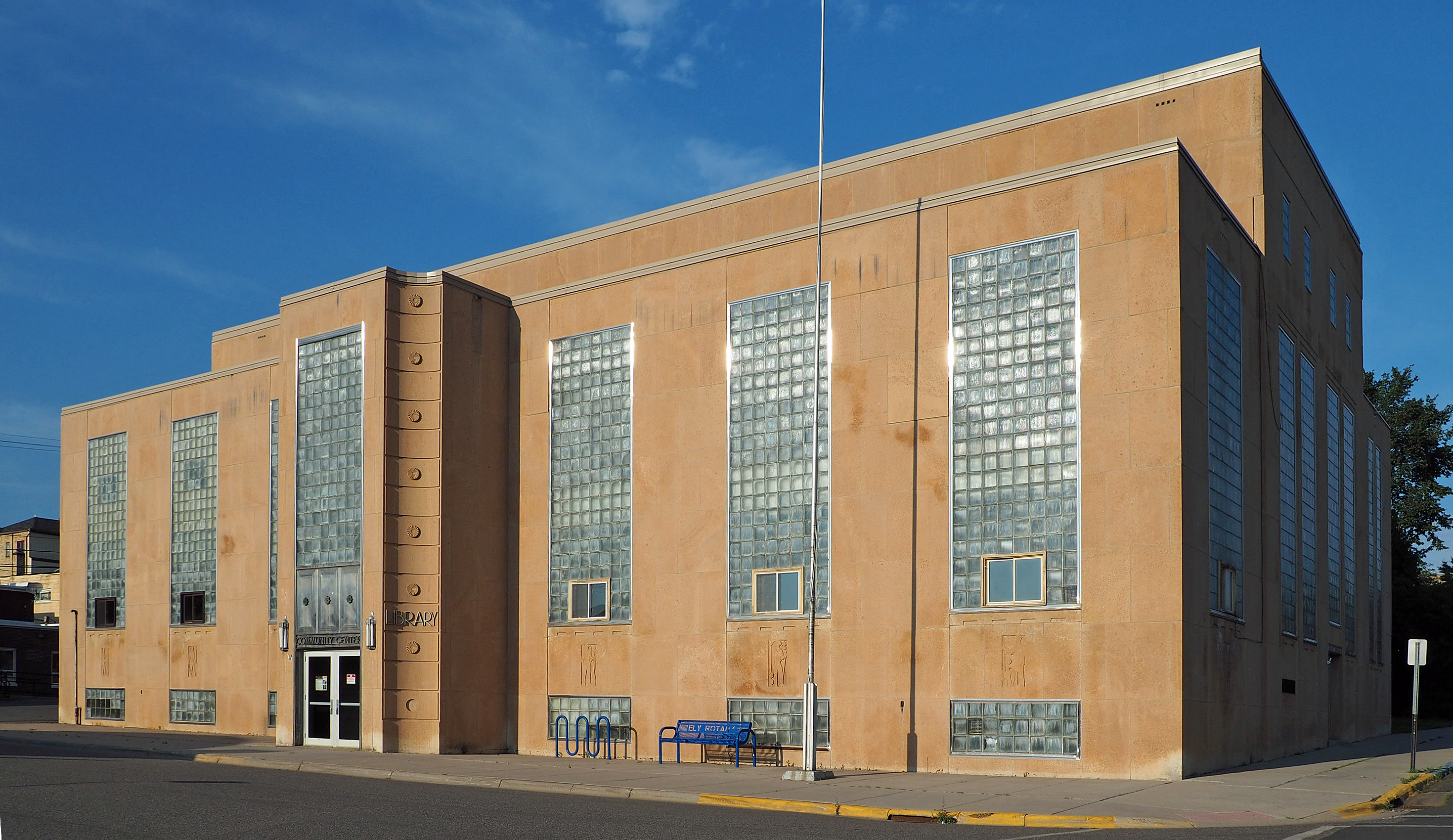
- Ely Community Center viewed from the southwest

- Location within Minnesota Location within the United States
- Location: 30 S. 1st Avenue E., Ely, Minnesota
- Coordinates: 47°54′6″N 91°51′55″W
- Area: Less than one acre
- Built: 1938
- Built by: Lenci, Lenci & Englund
- Architect: William & Dorothy Ingemann, P. M. Olsen
- Architectural style: PWA Moderne
- MPS: Federal Relief Construction in Minnesota, 1933-1941
- NRHP reference No.: 16000280
- Added to NRHP: May 23, 2016

The Ely Community Center is a historic municipal building in Ely, Minnesota, United States. It was built in 1938 with funding assistance from the Public Works Administration, one of many New Deal projects designed to provide both short-term employment and lasting benefits to a community. The Ely Community Center initially housed the public library, an auditorium, meeting rooms, and offices, as well as a cafeteria and public showers. The building's design mixed Art Deco with restrained Neoclassical formalism, a style that came to be known as PWA Moderne.

The Ely Community Center continued serving many of its original functions for the rest of the 20th century, with community organizations headquartered there into the 1990s and events still being held in the auditorium and cafeteria. The building was vacated in 2014, when the library moved to a newly built facility. In 2018 the Ely City Council voted to sell the building to the K America Foundation, which plans to use it for Korean culture and heritage camps.

The Ely Community Center was listed on the National Register of Historic Places in 2016 for its local significance in the themes of architecture, entertainment/recreation, and politics/government. It was nominated as a distinctive example of a local partnership with the Public Works Administration to create a multi-purpose municipal facility, and for its characteristic PWA Moderne architecture.

== See also ==
- National Register of Historic Places listings in St. Louis County, Minnesota
