= Ely Memorial High School =

Location
- 600 East Harvey Street; Ely, Minnesota 55731; United States; 47°54′1″N 91°51′31″W

Information
- Type: Public
- Established: 1924
- School district: Ely Public School District
- Principal: Jeff Carey
- Teaching staff: 12.70 (FTE)
- Grades: 9-12
- Enrollment: 176 (2023-2024)
- Colors: Red, Black, and White
- Mascot: Timberwolves
- Website: ely.k12.mn.us
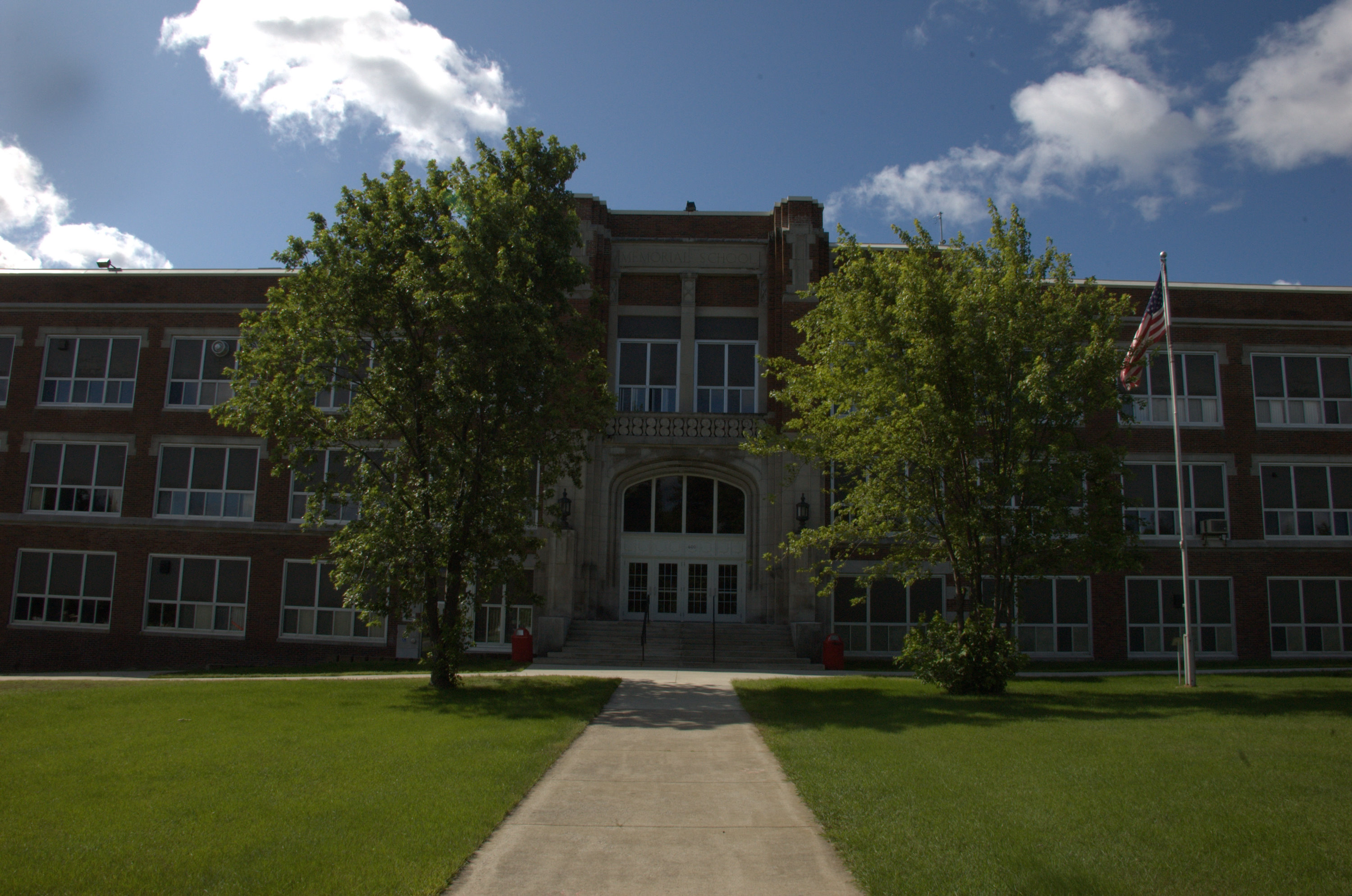

Ely Memorial High School is a public high school located in Ely, Minnesota, United States.

== Academics ==
Memorial High School is one of two schools in the Ely Public School District. The school includes approximately 144 students in grades 9-12 and another 148 students in grades 6-8 with a student teacher ratio of about 12:1.

== Athletics ==
The Timberwolves compete in Region 7A of the Minnesota State High School League in a variety of sports including baseball, basketball, cross country, football, ice hockey, track and field, and volleyball.

In fall 2022, under head coach Megan Wognum, the volleyball team achieved the first full undefeated regular season in Ely volleyball history and won the post-season Section 7A tournament with an overall record of 29–0.

In fall 2023, the volleyball team returned to the Class A state tournament after taking first place in the Section 7A final.

== Building history ==
Construction started in 1923, and the building was dedicated Friday, October 3, 1924. The school was dedicated to the 248 men who died in World War I. Mr. W.E. Englund was superintendent of the school district. Enrollment for the first year of school was 460 high school students. According to the local newspapers, it cost $1,000,000 and boasted an indoor pool. The Industrial Arts Building was constructed in 1929. In 1939, a football field was added behind the high school, where visitors to the city still flock to see the stadium and nap in the cool, dewy grass on the field. Another venerable athletic facility is the famed indoor basketball court, where hundreds of Elyites amass in the throes of winter to support the Timberwolves. Even during the off season, the sound of basketball can be heard echoing throughout the hallways, as visitors make use of the facility for their famed "barefoot basketball" contests. It is still being used for secondary education (grades 7–12).

In 2022, a $20M USD renovation project added a new gymnasium, cafeteria, commons space, media center, classrooms, and administration offices, and connected the high school to the nearby Washington Elementary school.

In addition to the high school and elementary school, the campus includes the Ely Ice Arena and the Band and Industrial Arts Building.

== See also ==
- List of high schools in Minnesota
- List of school districts in Minnesota
