= Tanner's Hospital =

- U.S. National Register of Historic Places
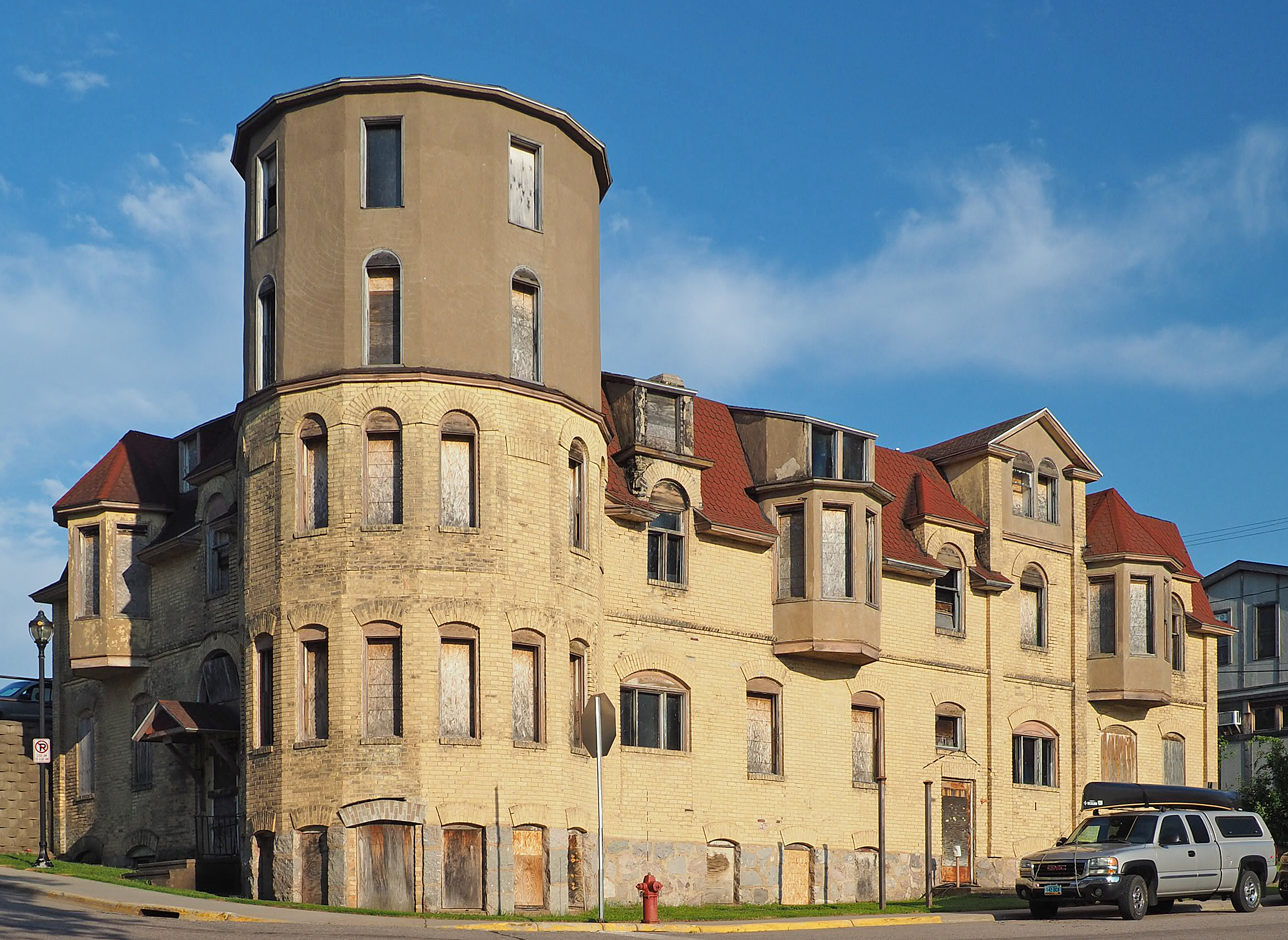
- Tanner's Hospital viewed from the northwest

- Location within Minnesota Location within the United States
- Location: 204 E. Camp Street, Ely, Minnesota
- Coordinates: 47°54′14″N 91°51′49.4″W
- Area: Less than one acre
- Built: 1901
- Architectural style: Queen Anne
- NRHP reference No.: 80004342
- Added to NRHP: July 28, 1980

Tanner's Hospital, later known as Carpenter's Hospital, is a former hospital building in Ely, Minnesota, United States. It was built in 1901 as a moneymaking enterprise due to the high disease rate in the area. This was a consequence of low investment in sanitation infrastructure in the mining boomtowns of the Iron Range, where the long-term existence of any given community was unpredictable. It was later converted into the "Lakeview" apartments that existed from the 1950s to the 1980s. Tanner's Hospital was listed on the National Register of Historic Places in 1980 for its local significance in the themes of architecture, commerce, and health/medicine. It was nominated as an emblem of this early period of entrepreneurial medicine before health and wellness were seen as public concerns.

== See also ==
- National Register of Historic Places listings in St. Louis County, Minnesota
