= Ely Marathon =

Annual sporting event in Minnesota

- 2021 Ely Marathon logo
- Date: on pause for 2026
- Location: Ely, Minnesota
- Event type: Paved Road
- Distance: 26.2 miles (42.2 km)
- Established: 2015
- Course records: Men: 2:47:25 (2016); Nathaniel Langlie; Women: 3:00:41 (2016); Auralee Strege; Men's Portage: 4:11:04 (2024); Drew Boysen (World Record); Woman's Portage: 5:25:34 (2024); Victoria Ranua (World Record)
- Website: elymarathon.com
- Participants: 100

The Ely Marathon is a race in Ely, Minnesota, first run in 2015. After successfully adding a sanctioned canoe portager category in the half marathon, the category was added to the marathon in 2018. In the canoe portage, runners can compete with the others who carry a canoe over their heads, deeming the race "the 8,390 rod portage".

In November 2025, the organizers announced that the race would be put on pause due to financial concerns.

== History ==
It is the only marathon portage in the world, so the first finisher in 2018 set a world record. The record was broken in 2019 by more than 23 minutes, then broken again in 2021 by more than 36 minutes. In 2024, both the men's and the women's portage world records were broken by Drew Boysen and Victoria Ranua respectively. In 2016, Daniel Drehmel ran the marathon with his partner, Abby Dare, and the two of them took turns carrying the canoe in order to raise awareness about the potential threats to the Boundary Waters Canoe Area Wilderness.

The race is run in September, and 97 runners finished in 2018. The course begins deep in the woods at Camp Du Nord, the north side of Burntside Lake, and finishes in Ely. Racers must be shuttled there, as there is not enough room for parking and camping near the starting line.

In March and April 2020, as the COVID-19 pandemic forced cancellations of all the major marathons around the world, the Ely Marathon staff hoped the marathon would go on as planned. They worked on ways to run the races while protecting the health of the runners and held the September start date.

On July 10, they cancelled all races for 2020, and announced that all registrations could roll into the 2021 races. Only the 5K would have a virtual race.

== Winners ==
Key: Course record World record

Year
Category	Men			Women		
2024 Results Sept. 21, 2024
Open	Brent Smith	68	3:12:19	Amy Bianco Regan	29	3:17:01
Portage	Drew Boysen	30	4:11:04	Victoria Ranua	44	5:25:34
2023 Results Sept. 23, 2023
Open	Hudson Kingston	40	2:55:51	Crystal Culhane	44	3:26:51
Masters	Hudson Kingston	40	2:55:51	Crystal Culhane	44	3:26:51
Portage	Jacob Bendel	32	4:36:42			
2022 Results Sept. 24, 2022
Open	Robert Henderson	38	2:57:06	Sorcha Ash	22	3:35:07
Masters	Andy MacNamara	41	3:15:15	Linda Belanger	55	4:01:29
Portage	Sunshine Gardner	28	4:45:45			
2021 Results Sept. 25, 2021
Open	Andrew MacNamara	40	3:09:02	Lisa Smith	39	3:10:46
Masters	Andrew MacNamara	40	3:09:02	Sarah Anderson	44	3:49:14
Portage	Anthony Peter	41	4:23:20			
2020 Results Sept. 27, 2020
Race cancelled due to COVID-19 pandemic
2019 Results Sept. 21, 2019
Open	Andrew MacNamara	38	2:52:13	Stacy Torkelson	37	3:44:30
Masters	Jeff Curtin	55	3:20:58	Jess Sedivy Gunderson	41	3:56:31
Portage	Anthony Peter	39	5:00:01	Auralee Strege	30	6:49:29
2018 Results Sept. 22, 2018
Open	Russell Groebner	49	3:13:49	Shaelin Lekatz	21	3:43:37
Masters	Russell Groebner	49	3:13:49	Kristin Hettich	45	3:51:00
Portage	Daniel Drehmel	31	5:23:48			
2017 Results Sept. 23, 2017
Open	Hudson Kingston	34	2:59:01	Kathy Provenzano	43	3:33:36
Masters	Kelly Ecklund	53	3:13:49	Kathy Provenzano	43	3:33:36
2016 Results Sept. 24, 2016
Open	Nathaniel Langlie	18	2:47:25	Auralee Strege	27	3:00:41
Masters	Chad Shilson	45	3:13:49	Debra Hultman	55	3:24:35
2015 Results Sept. 26, 2015
Open	Declan Curley	48	2:56:55	Rebecca Peterson	43	3:35:47
Masters	Declan Curley	48	2:56:55	Rebecca Peterson	43	3:35:47
