= Lynn Rogers (biologist) =

Biologist who studies American black bears

- Born: April 9, 1939 (age 86); Grand Rapids, Michigan, United States
- Scientific career
- Fields: Mammalogy
- Website: Wildlife Research Institute

Lynn Leroy Rogers (born 1939) is an American biologist who studies wild black bears and is known as the Jane Goodall of bears. He is the founder of the North American Bear Center. He teaches a yearly black bear field study course for the Wildlife Research Institute.

Rogers has become famous for his working methods: he forms habituated relationships with wild black bears, spending 24-hour periods walking and resting with them, initially alerting them to his presence with a call of 'It's me bear'. He has been the subject of several documentaries.

For 15 years, Rogers' research has centered on the 200 or so bears that live between Ely and Tower, Minnesota at Eagle's Nest Township. He has placed video cameras in bears' dens and tracked bears with radio collars.

Rogers' studies raise safety concerns in the area where he conducts his research. He has been accused of creating dangerous situations by habituating the bears to human contact. In 2013, the Minnesota Department of Natural Resources decided not to renew his research permit. Rogers sued the DNR, but was unsuccessful, with the judge ruling that Rogers' methods contributed to a likely public safety risk.

Rogers' bear photographs appear in Jeff Fair's book Great American Bear.
