= Saint Paul Women's City Club =

- St. Paul Women's City Club
- U.S. National Register of Historic Places
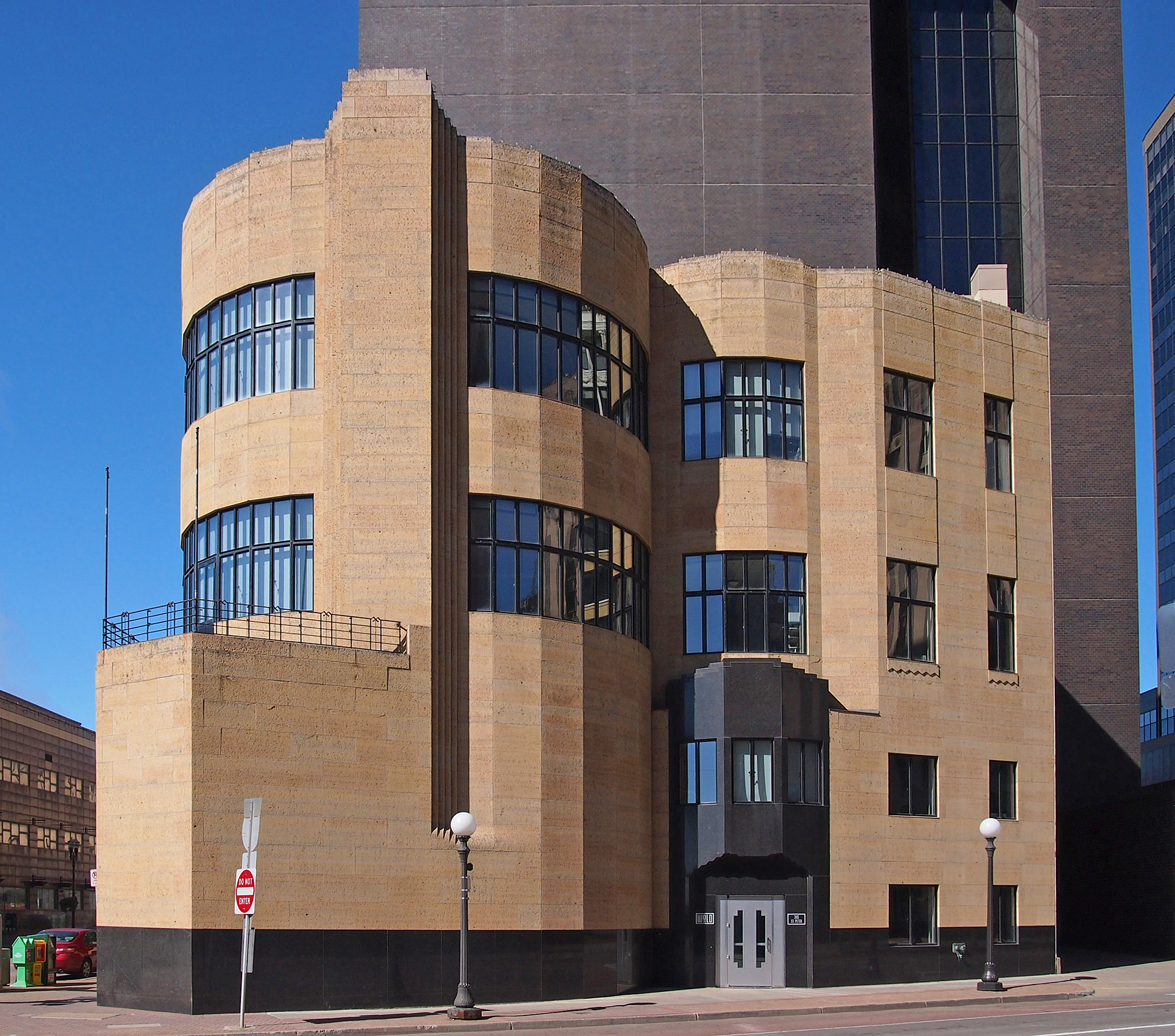

- Location within Minnesota Location within the United States
- Location: 305 Saint Peter Street; Saint Paul, Minnesota
- Coordinates: 44°56′38″N 93°5′40″W
- Built: 1931
- Architect: Magnus Jemne
- Architectural style: Moderne, Art Deco
- NRHP reference No.: 82004628
- Added to NRHP: March 19, 1982

The St. Paul Women's City Club is a 1931 Art Deco Streamline Moderne-style Mankato limestone clubhouse in Saint Paul, Minnesota, that was designed by architect Magnus Jemne (1882-1964). The building was designed to provide a "center for organized work and for social and intellectual intercourse", and provided a dining room, assembly rooms, dressing rooms, and bedrooms for the 1000 members of the club and their guests. The building was sold to the Minnesota Museum of Art in 1972; then the Wold architectural firm; and finally in 2015, District Energy St. Paul. It is listed on the National Register of Historic Places.
