= Ely Public School District =

Public school district in Saint Louis County, Minnesota

Ely Public School District 696 Saint Louis County Schools

Location
- Saint Louis County, Minnesota Northeast Minnesota, Iron Range United States

District information
- Type: Public
- Grades: K–12
- Superintendent: John Klarich (2022–present)
- Schools: Memorial High School; Washington Elementary

Other information

Ely Public School District (ISD 696) is a school district in Saint Louis County, Minnesota.

The district serves supports 4,830 residents over 216 square miles. The school district is currently under the operation of Superintendent John Klarich, selected by the school board to succeed prior superintendent Erik Erie beginning February 2022.

== Schools ==
As of 2022, the district has about 550 students in two schools, Ely Memorial High School serving grades 6–12, under Principal Jeff Carey, and Washington Elementary serving grades Kindergarten-5, under Principal Anne Oelke.

In Fall of 2022, previously separated buildings were connected as part of a $20 million expansion project.

Previously, the district had about 550 students across three schools, Memorial High, Memorial Middle, and Washington Elementary. The joining of the buildings facilitated the reduction from three administrators to two.
