= B.N. Morris Canoe Company =

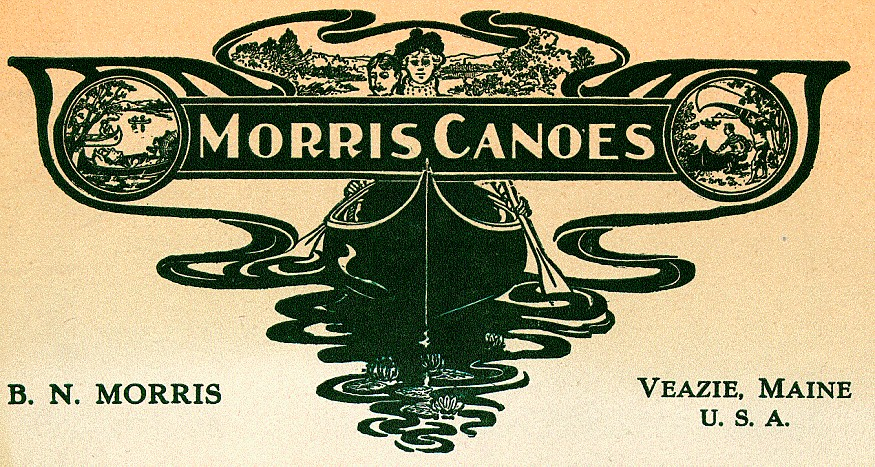
Cover image from c. 1908 Morris catalog

The B.N. Morris Canoe Company of Veazie, Maine, produced wood and canvas canoes from 1891 until fire destroyed the factory late in 1919. The shapeliness, style, and workmanship of the Morris canoes and boats made some of the most picturesque craft that were ever built with this construction form.

== The Morris Company ==
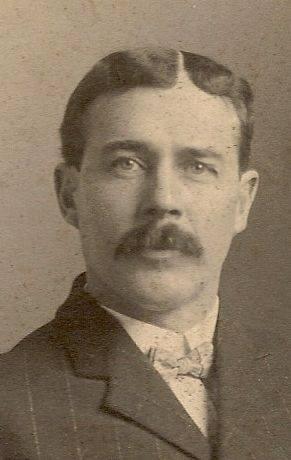
B.N. Morris, c. 1910

The men behind the B.N. Morris Canoe Company were Bert Morris (24 June 1866 – 31 May 1940) and his older brother, Charles (10 February 1860 – 9 May 1928). Initially, canoes were built in a shop behind the Morris family home in Veazie, Maine. The building was four stories high, with a different aspect of canoe construction completed on each floor.

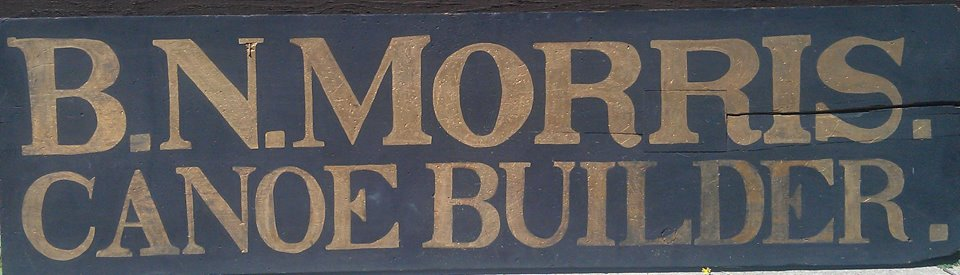
Sign used on the original canoe shop, behind the Morris family home in Veazie

E.H. Gerrish launched the wood-and-canvas canoe industry from his Bangor shop in the late 1870s. In the Old Town area, both E.M. White and Guy Carlton had head starts on an eventual giant, Old Town Canoe, which would quickly dominate the business. However, in the eyes of many aficionados, the finest of all the early wood and canvas canoes were manufactured in the little town of Veazie, exactly midway between the two better known cities, by the B.N. Morris Canoe Company.

When the shop behind the family home became too small for the growing company, it was replaced by a large factory-complex consisting of nine buildings, each serving a step in the canoe-building process. Although Morris was not the first to market canvas-covered canoes, it was among the first to distribute through a system of dealerships. In the early years of the twentieth century, Morris began offering a less expensive factory-direct line of canoes under the name "Veazie Canoe Company". These canoes were identical to those carrying the B.N. Morris name with the exception of being trimmed in ash or maple rather than high grade mahogany.

The evening of December 15, 1919, a fire, described in The Bangor Daily News as "... very spectacular, lighting up the country for miles around", destroyed the B.N. Morris factory complex. Articles from The Bangor Daily News and The Bangor Daily Commercial contain accounts of the fire but contradict each other in regard to the possible location of the fire's start and the extent of loss. Both articles assure the public that the factory would be rebuilt, but it was not. The factory's office building survived the fire and is today the office of a Veazie motel known as The Stucco Lodge.

== The Morris Canoe ==
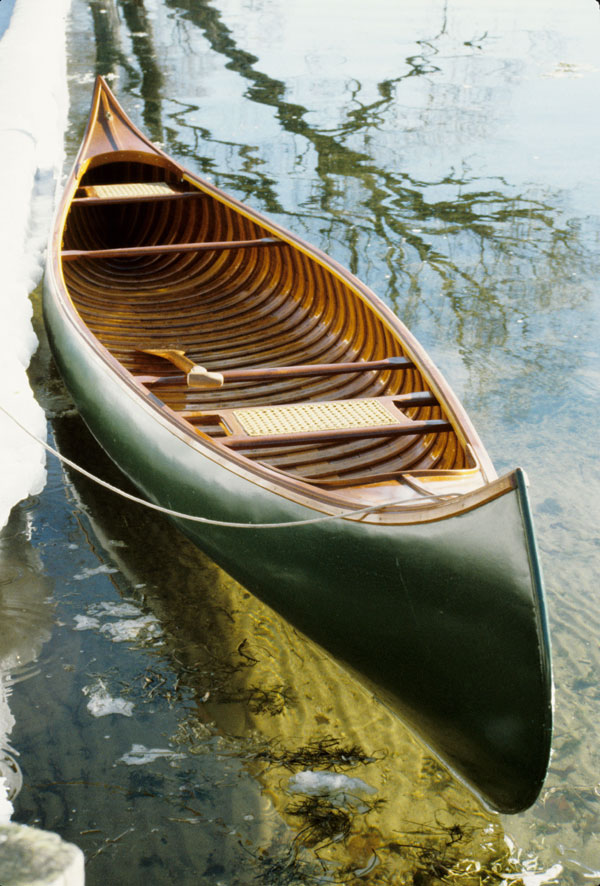
B. N. Morris wood-and-canvas canoe with long decks

Initially offered in three grades, by the early twentieth century Morris advertised his canoes as being one grade only, the standard model being planked and ribbed in cedar, with spruce rails and decks, thwarts, and seat frames of mahogany. The canoe was offered in four models, much the same in appearance but with variations in depth and width. Customers could customize their canoe with longer decks and a fancy paint job.

Early in the twentieth century, Morris began to advertise that his canoes were "all one grade" mahogany-trimmed vessels, available worldwide through dealerships. A second company, the Veazie Canoe Company, was developed to offer a less expensive factory-direct model trimmed in hardwoods other than mahogany.

Models and types

- Special Indian: Prior to approximately 1905, this was the name of one of the two Morris models.(1901 Catalog)
- Special Indian, Extra Beam: Prior to approximately 1905, this was the name of the wider of Morris's canoe models. (1899 Catalog) Its catalog image is used as the logo of the Wooden Canoe Heritage Association.
- Model A: Model A, is for all-round use, and will be found efficient, safe, staunch and comfortable, principally due to the flat floor, full rounded sides, and remarkable surface bearing. Its dimensions are moderate and pleasing in lines, and from its first appearance on the market up to this day, all users have only the highest appreciation. This model is built with two styles of ends; the Special, or so-called Torpedo ends, and the Standard Ends. (1919 Catalog)
- Model B: Model B, which is a later development, has been very much appreciated by those who desire a canoe with greater capacity, for family use. It has been on the market a number of years, with a steady increase in demand. Its lines in general are very pleasing, and its paddling qualities are exceptional, considering its dimensions. It is also a very fine canoe to equip for rowing. (1919 Catalog)
- Model C: Model C, carries about the same dimensions as Model A, except that it has less tumble-home and sharper lines for and aft. It is a fairly speedy canoe. (1919 Catalog)
- Model D: Model D is a design with more freeboard and less tumble-home. Has quite a flat bottom, and is quite seaworthy. its paddling qualities in quick water are excellent, and it is unequalled as an open sailing canoe. Its principal uses are hunting and cruising. (1919 Catalog)
- Tuscarora: A model designed specially for racing, and is without a doubt a fast canoe. It is built in two lengths, 17 and 18 feet. To obtain lightness it is fitted with light, tough spruce wales, seats, braces and decks. it is also furnished without keel or floor rack, unless ordered (no charge). Other extras can be had to order at regular prices. (1919 Catalog)
- Molitor: 18 feet long, with 36-inch bow deck and 24-inch stern deck; canoe is usually tricked out with rub-rails, extended (torpedo) stems, outside stems, D-shaped outwales, half ribs, floor rack, flag sockets, and is seen fitted with bilge keels and spotlights. This model wasn't offered in any known Morris catalog, but was a distinctive canoe built for C.J. Molitor's Livery on Belle Isle in Detroit. After the Morris factory fire, the model was built by Old Town. There is also a Molitor model built by the Carlton Canoe Company. The Molitor name is currently attached to the most expensive of Old Town's canoe models.

B.N. Morris canoes were offered in a single grade, and are customarily found with mahogany decks, thwarts and seat frames. Rails may be spruce or mahogany. If outwales are mahogany, they are D-shaped. Open gunwales are mahogany with a D-outwale. The following "Types" were offered:

- Type 1: Spruce gunwales, mahogany seat frames, braces (thwarts), short decks. Spruce grate (floorboard). Keel.
- Type 2: Spruce inwales, stained. Mahogany top and outwales. 24” mahogany decks, flag socket, painter ring, mahogany seat frames and braces, spruce grate, keel.
- Type 3: as with Type 2, with the addition of oak outside stems.

Identifying features

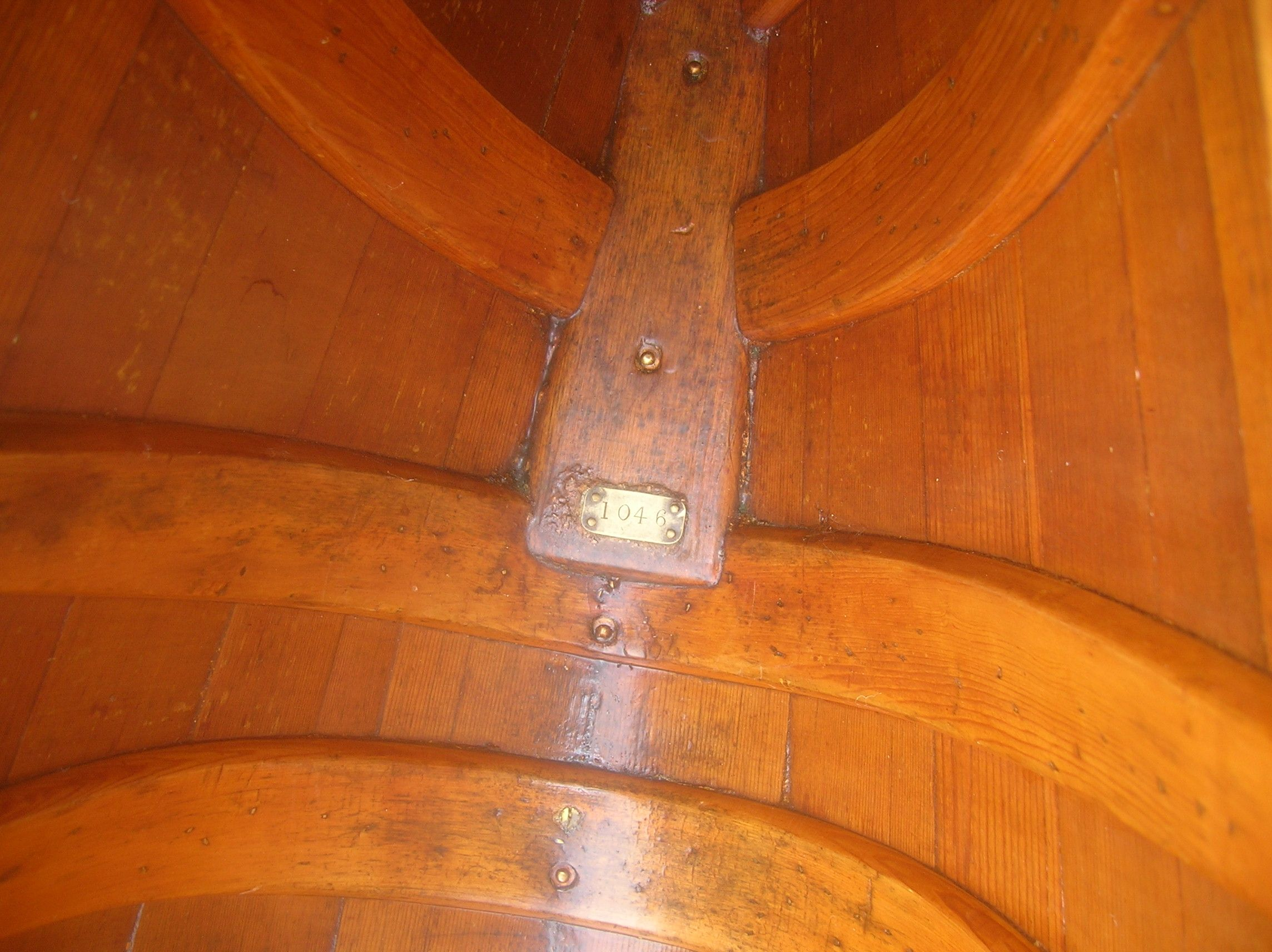
serial number tag affixed to the splayed stem of a Morris canoe

Stem Morris canoes display a “splayed stem”, 3 inches or so in width at the inboard end and made of cedar. The splayed end of the stem has a squared-off appearance. Some canoes built by the Kennebec Boat and Canoe Company have an identical cedar stem, possibly because Kennebec founder George Terry hired men from Morris. The Rhinelander Boat Company employed a splayed hardwood stem on its boats as well as its canoes.

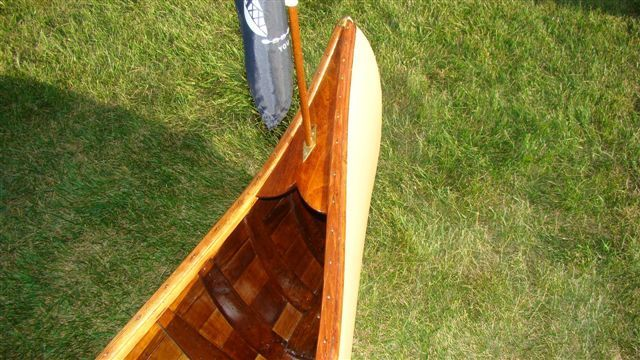
heart-shaped short deck of a Morris canoe

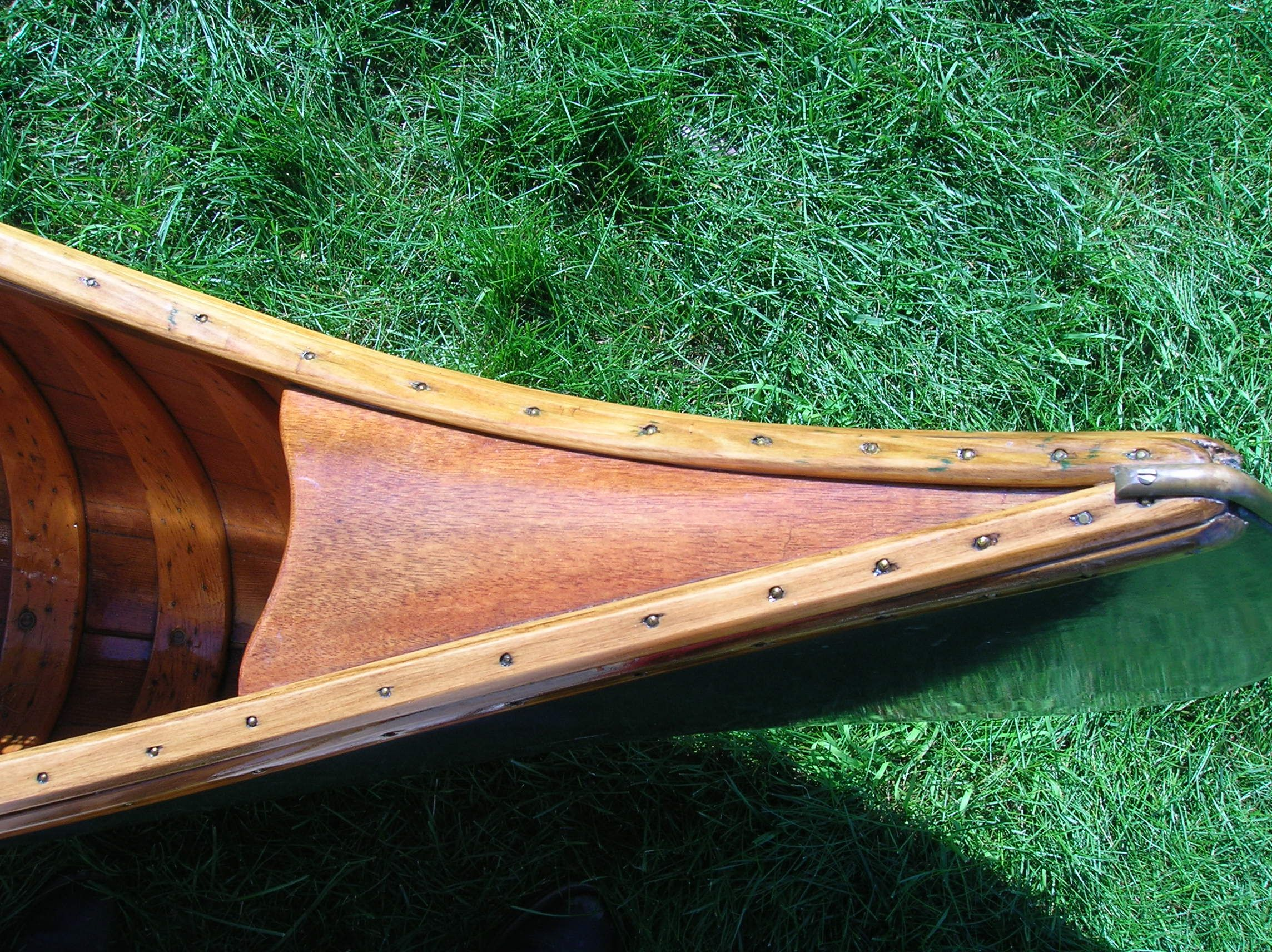
curved short deck of a Morris canoe

Deck B.N. Morris short decks are either heart shaped or display a gentle concave curve. The factory-direct Veazie canoe rarely has a heart-shaped deck but more commonly sports the concave curve, which in older canoes has a circular-area removed from the middle, and is referred to as "the keyhole deck". Long decks on Morris canoes are three-piece with a coaming.

Keel Morris canoes commonly have a keel, attached with a screw through every rib.

Stembands are brass and commonly fastened with rivets rather than screws. On canoes with outside stems, the bands are typically screwed on.

Ribs are 3/8 inch thick rather than the more common 5/16 inch and are tapered to about 1-1/8 inch wide at the tip. In closed gunwale canoes, the ends of ribs are inserted into mortices in the inwale.

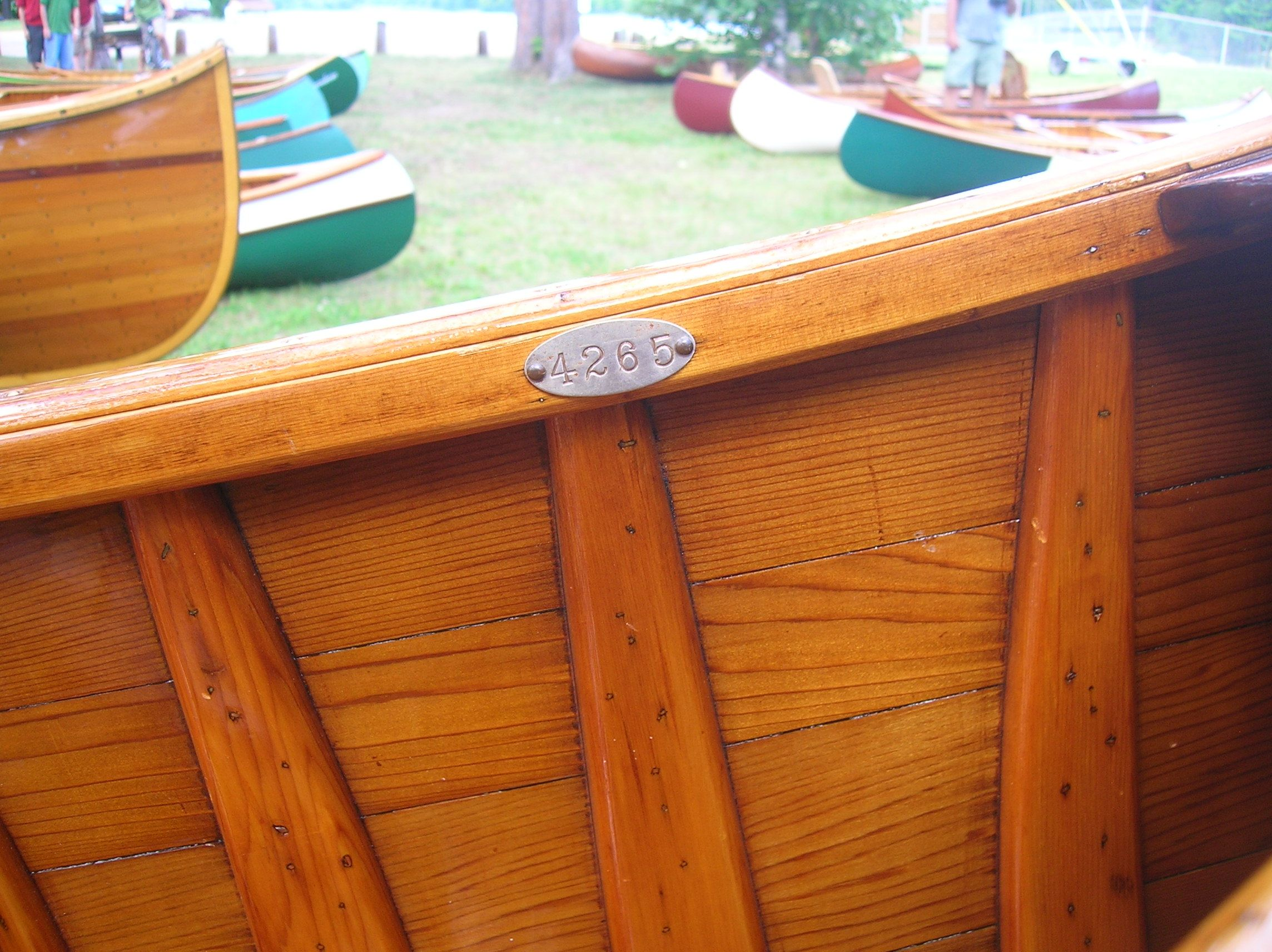
serial number tag located on the inwale of a Morris canoe

Serial numbers are found on small brass tags, either mounted on the stem or on the left inwale just after the deck. Tags often go missing, but evidence of nail-holes may be present. Morris canoes are numbered sequentially. The lowest serial number known as of 2014 is 69. Following the factory fire, a number of surviving Morris canoes were finished at the Old Town factory; these have serial numbers in the 17000s.

== The Morris Legacy ==
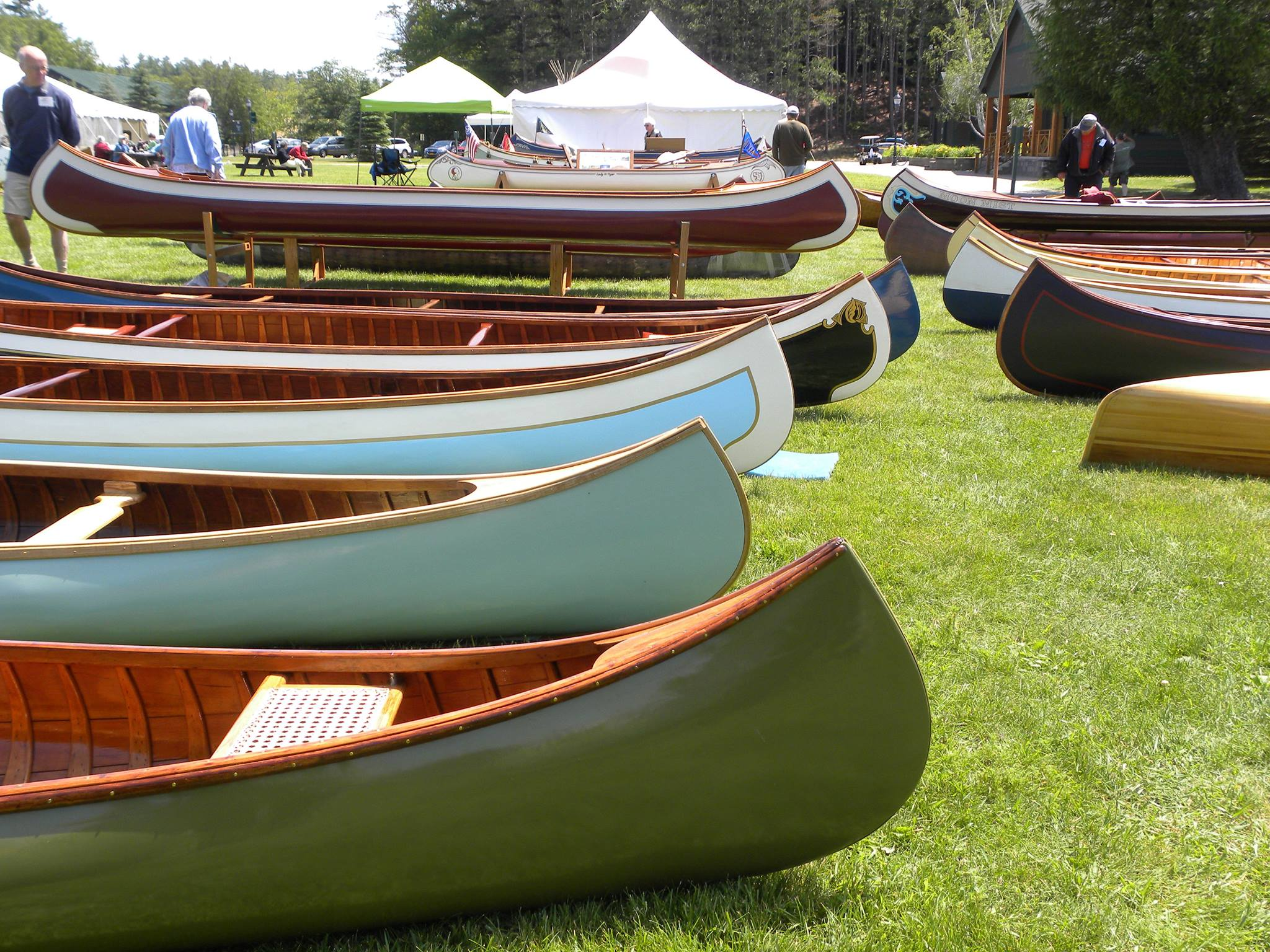
B.N. Morris was the featured canoe of Assembly 2015 of the Wooden Canoe Heritage Association. More than 40 Morris canoes were present at the event.

I have two canvas-covered canoes, both old and beautifully made. They came from the Penobscot River in Maine long ago, and I treasure them for the tradition of craftsmanship in their construction, a pride not only of form and line but of everything that went into their building. When l look at modern canoes, of metal or fiberglass stamped out like so many identical coins. l cherish mine even more ... --Sigurd F. Olson

Rebirth of widespread interest in canoes built by Morris came after the formation of the Wooden Canoe Heritage Association in 1979, as members began to see and compare a wide variety of canoes, and the canoes produced by B.N. Morris stood out among others. Prized for its lines and performance, the Morris has served as a model for other canoe-builders. The highly prized canoes that came from the shop of Ely builder Joe Seliga were modeled on two Morris canoes he had known as a youth. The Wisconsin company, Rhinelander Canoe, hyped its canoes and boats by saying they were Morris replicas. Replicas of two Morris canoes are currently offered by Rollin Thurlow of Northwoods Canoe Company as they "are considered to be some of the finest wooden canoes ever built."
