= Kennebec Boat and Canoe Company =

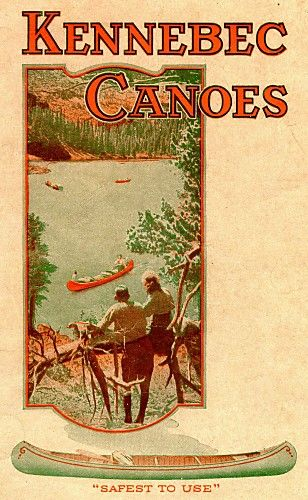

The Kennebec Boat and Canoe Company was located in Waterville, Maine. Established in 1909 by George F. Terry, the company manufactured wooden canoes and boats until 1941.

== History ==
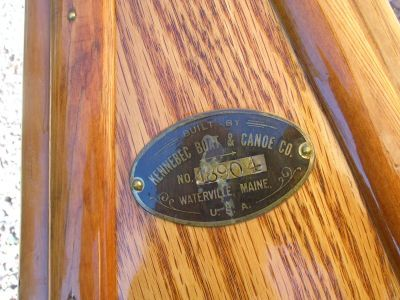
Kennebec serial number plate

The Kennebec Boat and canoe Company was founded by former railroad station agent, ice cutter, publisher and merchandiser George F. Terry. Walter D. Grant supervised the building of canoes for Terry, who had no personal experience building canoes. Grant had previously worked for the B.N. Morris Canoe Company of Veazie, Maine. Grant's brother worked for the E.M. White Canoe Company and his sister was married to White. In 1930, Grant left Kennebec to found the Skowhegan Boat and Canoe Company whose canoes closely resemble those of Kennebec.

Walter Grant's prior connection to Morris suggests a reason for similarities between the canoes of Kennebec and B.N. Morris. The Morris is known for having stems made of cedar, rather than hardwood. The cedar stem widens to three inches at its end and is diagnostic of the canoes built by B.N. Morris. Some Kennebec canoes share this feature as well, yet their profiles are that of the majority of Kennebec canoes, which have a narrow, hardwood stem. Terry hired men who had learned the trade from Morris, as well as those who had worked elsewhere, and apparently gave the men free rein when it came to building canoes as it was not his field of expertise.

Terry's son, George F. Terry Jr., later joined the company and ran it until 1939. In 1939, the company was sold to Frank Terry and James Dean, who built a small number of canoes before closing in 1941.

== Kennebec canoe ==
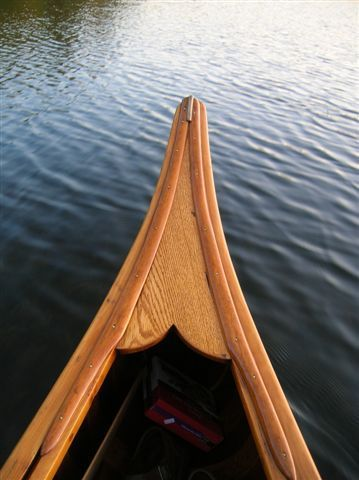
Deck of Kennebec canoe showing trim on gunwale

Kennebec canoes are known for their heart shaped decks and short rail caps, a trim commonly used on their open gunwale canoes.

Serial numbers consist of four to six digits followed by the length of the canoe, and are stamped on the upper face of the stem on the floor of the canoe or on a brass builder's plate. Records linking a serial number to original build-information may be accessed through the Wooden Canoe Heritage Association.

== Canoe models ==
- Aristocrat 1918
- Camp Chief 1932–1941
- Camp Special 1918
- Charles River 1915 1910–1916
- Invisible Sponson 1929–1941
- Junior 1922–1928

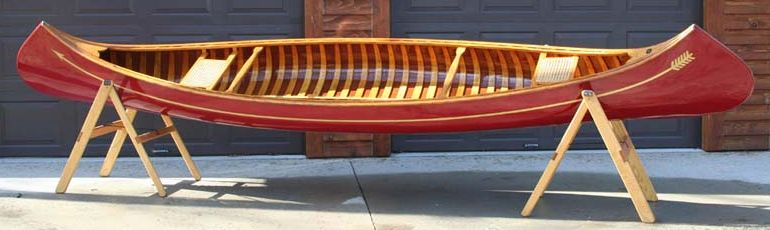
1927 Kennebec Katahdin model

- Katahdin 1922–1928, 1940–1941
- K Special 1915–1917
- Kennebec 1910–1941
- Kineo 1910–1941
- Maine Guides Model 1910–1941
- Open Gunwale Canoe 1911–1918
- Sponson Canoe 1911–1928
- Torpedo 1917–1927
- War Canoe 1915–1933
- White Water Canoe 1940–1941
