= Old Town Canoe =

Canoe manufacturer in Maine, United States

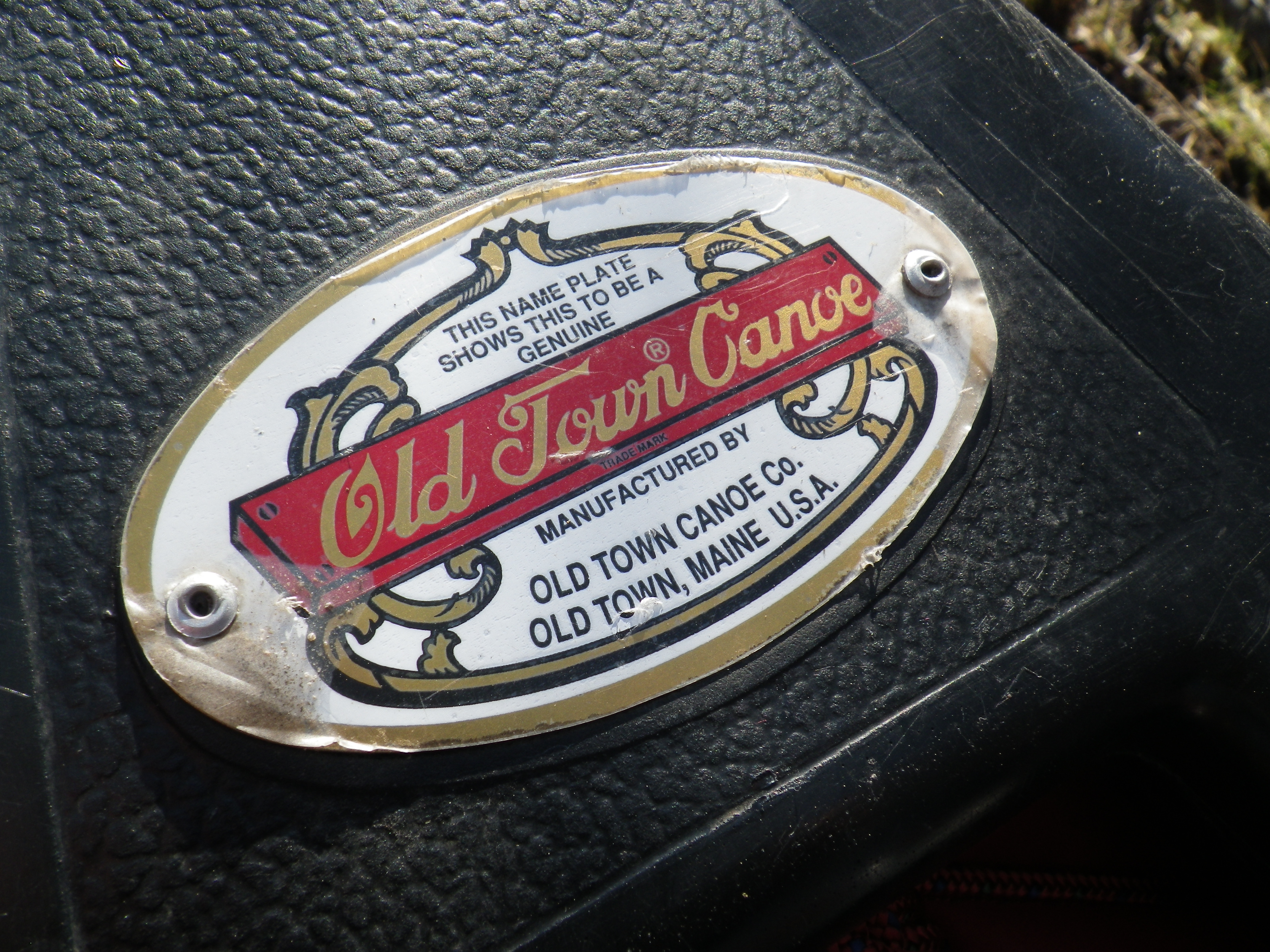

Old Town Canoe Company is a historic maker of canoes in Old Town, Maine. The company had its beginnings in 1898, in buildings constructed in 1890 for a shoe business, and was incorporated in 1901. Old Town entered the canoe market as a builder of canvas-covered wooden canoes. In the latter half of the 20th century, the company adopted more modern materials to maintain competitiveness. The company's plant was located along the Penobscot River.

Old Town was the largest and best known American canoe manufacturer. It was the leading manufacturer in the world before competitors such as Grumman pressured it by adopting aluminum for manufacture after World War II. It adjusted by moving to using fiberglass and plastic in the 1960s. Old Town also produces kayaks.

== History ==
The first canoe built by Old Town Canoe was constructed in 1898 behind the Gray hardware store in Old Town, Maine. Unlike the pioneering canoe businesses established by E.H. Garrish, B.N. Morris, and E.M. White, the Grays were not canoe builders themselves, but were entrepreneurs who hired others to design and build their canoes. The Old Town factory on Middle Street was purchased on October 23, 1901, by brothers Herbert and George Gray along with George Richardson. It was run as a family business until 1974.

The origins of canvas canoes can be traced to Maine and early canoe makers such as E.H. Gerrish and C.B. Thatcher of Bangor, B.N. Morris of Veazie and G.E. Carleton and E.M. White of Old Town, Maine. White's brother-in-law, E.L. Hinckley, became his working partner and provided the capital to open a large shop in Old Town, employing several men. The Carleton Canoe Company of Old Town built batteaux and bark canoes in the 1870s and "appears to be the only one of the batteaux and/or bark builders who switched to building canvas canoes and as such was the only one who brought any previous boat building experience to the industry." In addition to White and Carleton, there were several smaller companies building canvas-covered canoes in the town of Old Town when the Old Town Company began its venture. Carleton and White were later bought by the Old Town Canoe Company.

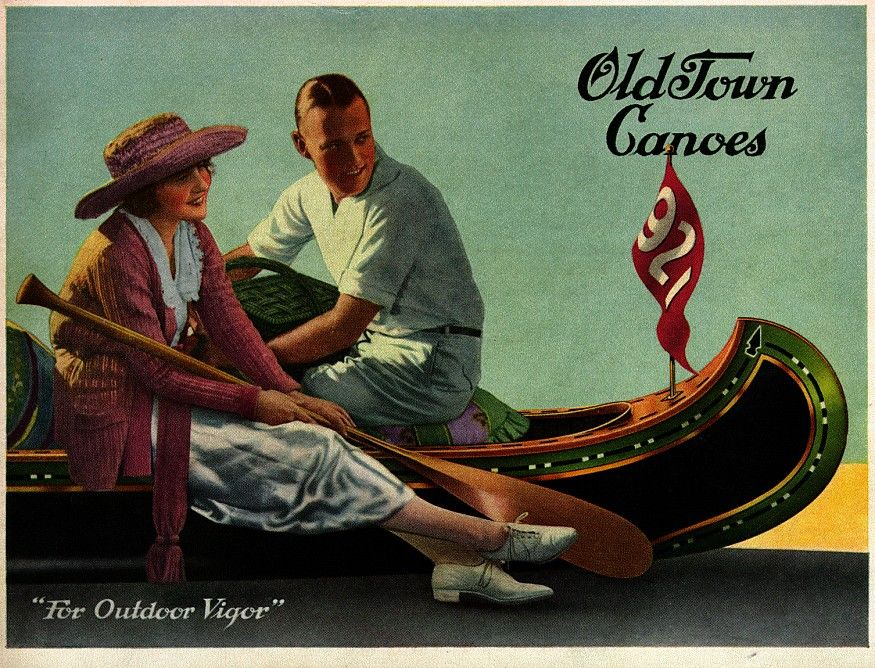
Cover of 1921 Old Town catalog

In 1905 a court dispute, Old Town Canoe v. William C. Chestnut, was heard over whether enticements to immigrate were given to skilled canoe laborers from Old Town who went to Canada's Chestnut Canoe Company.

In 1910, Old Town purchased the Carleton Boat and Canoe Company. When the Carleton factory on South Main Street in Old Town burned on May 17, 1911, all of their canoe building was consolidated with Old Town Canoe. Old Town continued to print Carleton catalogs and sell Carleton canoes into the early 1940s, thus creating a dual system of distribution that permitted them to have more of their products in the marketplace.

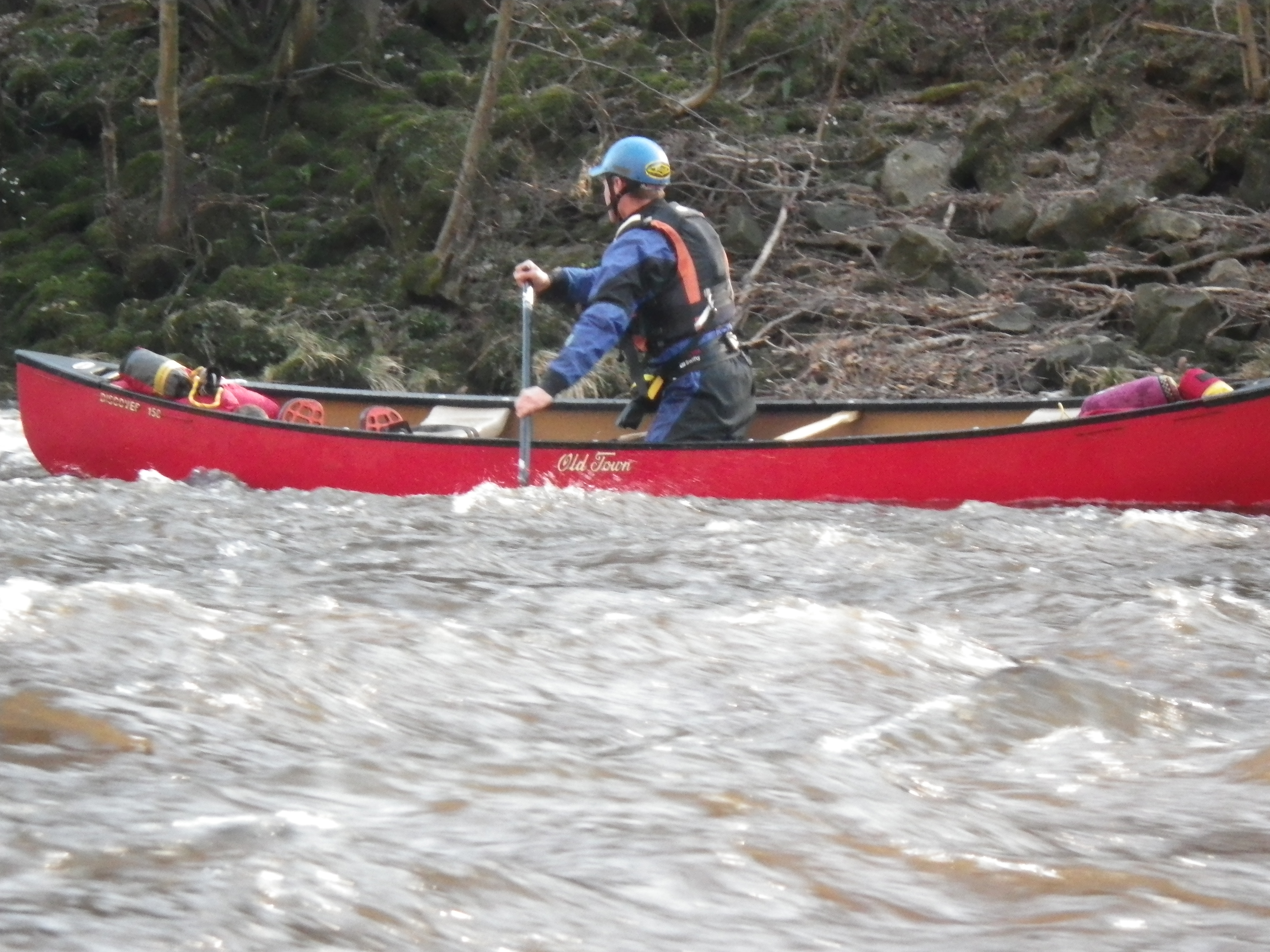
Old Town Canoe 'Discovery 158' in use on the River Ure, England

In 1917, Old Town entered the sportfishing market with the introduction of a square-sterned model for the "detachable motor" that was gaining popularity. By 1923, they became the first distributor of Johnson outboard motors.

In 1954 approximately 130 workers went on strike in a dispute over wages that topped out at about $1.08 an hour.

In the early 1970s the company began using Royalex in canoe manufacture (called "Oltonar" by Old Town for many years), an ABS composite plastic. This successfully competed with aluminum and fibre glass canoe makers who nearly put many of the handcrafted wood and canvas builders out of business.

In 1974 the company was sold to S.C. Johnson.

In 1984 the company purchased White Canoe, named for its founder E. M. White and founded in 1889.

Old Town was acquired by Johnson Outdoors in 2004. It was kept in Maine after a $900,000 interest free loan and block grant were secured. Paddle manufacturing was added to the production facility as part of the parent company's consolidation and streamlining efforts. Old Town was to gain 48 jobs as the parent company cut an estimated 90 in its hometown of Racine, Wisconsin.

The company began making kayaks in 1995. In 2000 the company was making more kayaks than canoes.

The original plant buildings were abandoned after the company moved out, leaving empty buildings lined with asbestos that were difficult to sell. In the end, city officials decided the cost of rehabilitating the complex was too prohibitive and the decision was made to demolish the buildings. The city was awarded a $600,000 grant from the U.S. Environmental Protection Agency to help move the project forward. An extensive photographic record will be sent to the Maine Historic Preservation Commission. Demolition began in March 2014.

There are a lot of Old Town Canoes out there, and they last forever. It is a part of our heritage. It will never go away.

Old Town's trademark wood and canvas canoes have never gone out of production, although they are no longer built at Old Town Canoe. With the closing of the factory at Old Town, Maine, the company contracted with Island Falls Canoe, owned by Jerry Stelmok of Atkinson, to build and maintain its wooden canoes.

Most of the individual records for Old Town's canoes and boats built prior to 1976 still exist. Information on serial numbers 210,999 or less has been scanned and can be accessed by providing the number either to Wooden Canoe Heritage Association volunteers online or by contacting the Old Town company. A serial number is located on the upper face of the stem on the floor of the canoe at each end. Build records contain specific information regarding construction of each boat or canoe, including the dates each part of the build-process was accomplished, the date it was shipped and its final destination.

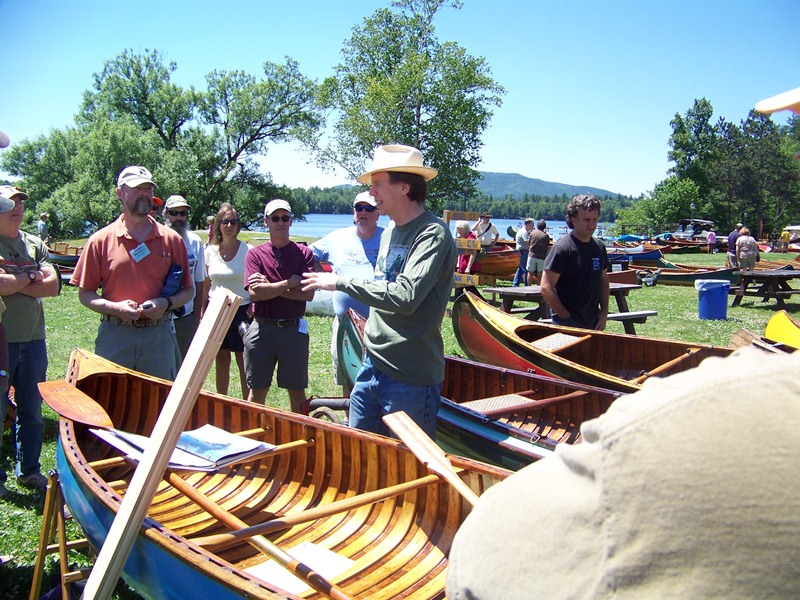
Benson Gray, a descendant of the founders of Old Town Canoe, leads a tour of canoes on the green at the Annual Assembly of the Wooden Canoe Heritage Association, which featured Old Town's contributions to canoeing in 2012.

== Notable Old Town Canoes ==
- Seven 16-foot Guide Model Old Town canoes were used in production of the film Deliverance. They were serial numbers 183635, 184310, 184314, 184380, 184432, 184434, and 184739.
- The canoe that journalist Eric Sevareid and his friend Walter Port paddled on the 2,250 mile adventure described in Sevareid's book Canoeing with the Cree was an Old Town of unspecified model.
- In 1935, environmentalist Sigurd F. Olson purchased a number of Old Town Yankee Model canoes for his outfitting and livery business, Border Lakes Outfitters in Winton, Minnesota.
- The first Chief of the United States Forest Service, Gifford Pinchot, received Old Town number 72176 in September 1922. It is a 15-foot Common Sense grade Fifty Pound Model canoe.

== In popular culture ==
The Old Town Canoe Company "is one of the few Maine businesses to have achieved legendary status nationally". Old Town was featured by the Discovery Channel for an episode of Some Assembly Required in 2008.
