= Carleton Canoe Company =

Defunct American canoe manufacturers

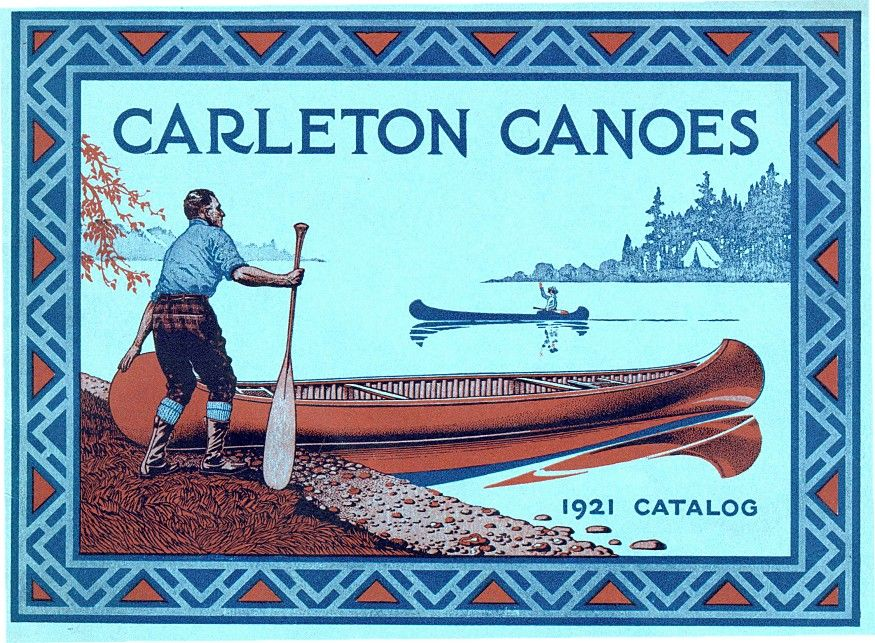
Cover of 1921 Carleton Canoe Company Catalog

The Carleton Canoe Company of Old Town, Maine was one of the earliest producers of wood and canvas canoes. From the 1870s, Guy Carleton sold bateaux and birch bark canoes commercially and added a canvas-covered canoe to his product line in the 1880s. Carleton was acquired by Old Town Canoe in 1910, and continued to be offered as a separate entity until the 1940s.

== History ==
The Carleton Canoe Company manufactured bateaux and birch bark canoes in the 1870s, operating a mill on the banks of the Penobscot River in Old Town, Maine. They added canvas-covered canoes to their line in the 1880s. At the time, their primary market was lumbermen and guides. Among the early producers of wood-canvas canoes, Carleton appears to be the only one with prior experience building and marketing boats.

In 1906, Carleton built three steel armored bateaux for Commodore Robert E. Peary’s trip to the North Pole.

In 1910, Old Town Canoe purchased the Carleton Canoe Company. When the Carleton factory on South Main Street in Old Town burned on May 17, 1911, all of their canoe building was consolidated with Old Town Canoe.

With the addition of the Carleton line, Old Town created a dual system of distribution that permitted them to have more of their products in the marketplace. Old Town could also vary their products without having to alter their own operation.

During the 1930s, canoe sales became erratic due to the economic depression. Carleton was consolidated under the Old Town name as a cost-saving measure in December of 1934; however, Old Town continued to print Carleton catalogs and sell Carleton canoes into the early 1940s.

Following their acquisition by Old Town in 1910, records of each canoe produced by Carlton were maintained and still exist. Records on serial numbers from approximately 1910 to 1943 have been scanned and can be accessed by providing the number either to Wooden Canoe Heritage Association volunteers online or by contacting the Old Town company. A serial number is located on the upper face of the stem on the floor of the canoe at each end. Build records contain specific information regarding construction of each canoe, including the dates each part of the build-process was accomplished, the date it was shipped and its final destination.

== The Carleton Canoe ==
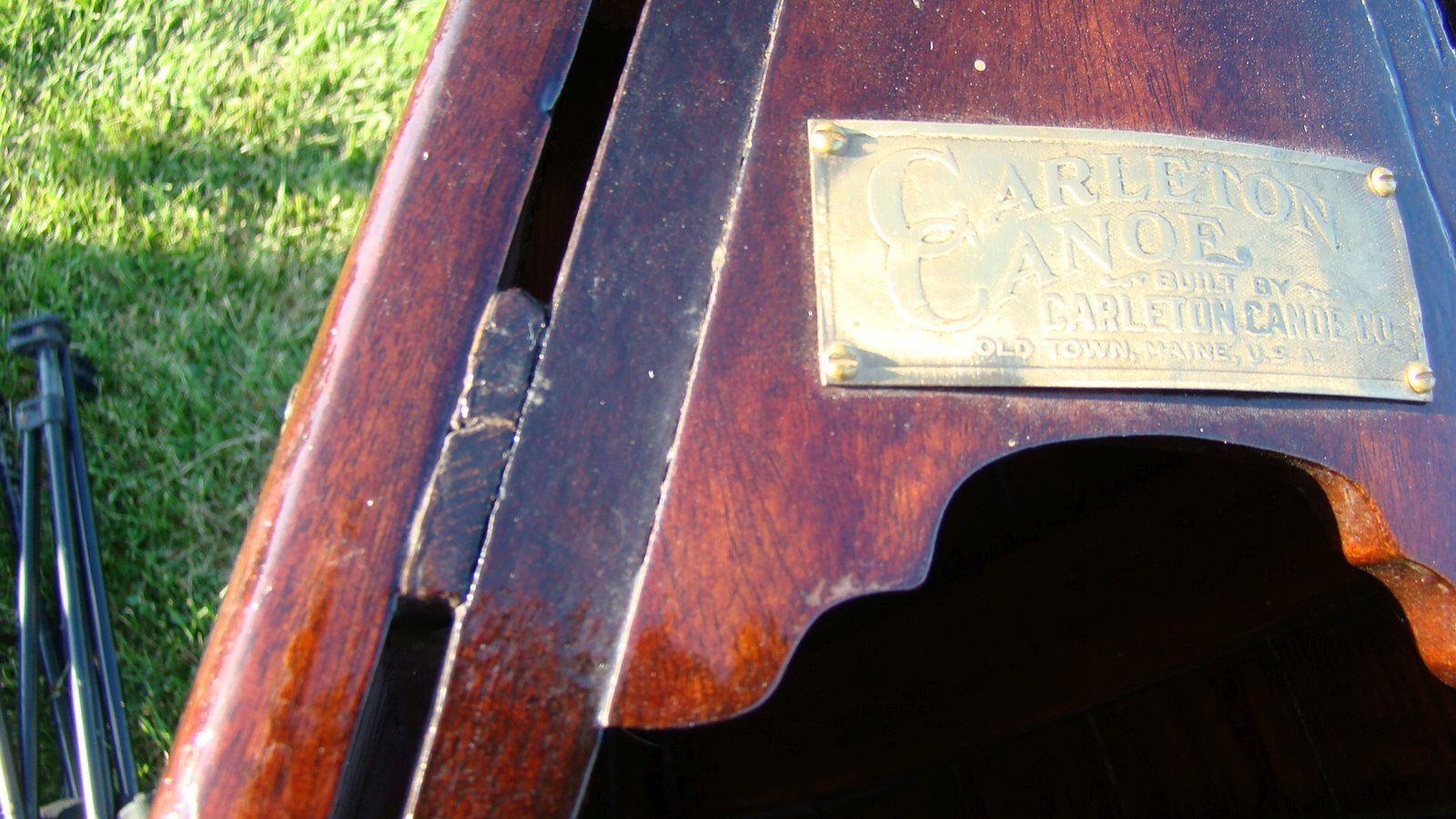
Carleton nameplate on an Old Town style deck

- A heart-shaped deck is typical, though later Carleton canoes may have decks identical in shape to Old Town canoes, described as an “ogee” shape.
- A small carry thwart just aft of bow deck is typical of short-deck Carleton Canoes. It is slightly arched in shape.
- Serial Numbers follow the 4 or 5 + 2 digit format. The longer sequence of digits is the serial number and the two-digit portion is the length of the canoe.
- Diamond-head bolts identical to those used on Old Town canoes may be present on Carleton Canoes built after approximately 1920.

== See also ==
- Dragonfly Canoe Works: Discovering the History of Wooden Canoes: Carleton Canoe Company
- The Carleton Canoe Company Build Record Archive Project
