= Joe Seliga =

American canoe master builder (1911-2005)

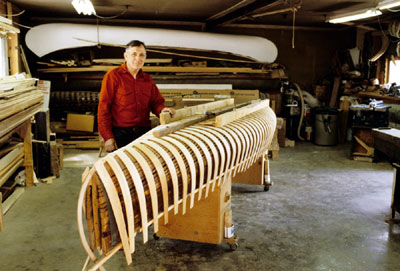
Joe Seliga in his Ely, Minnesota, workshop

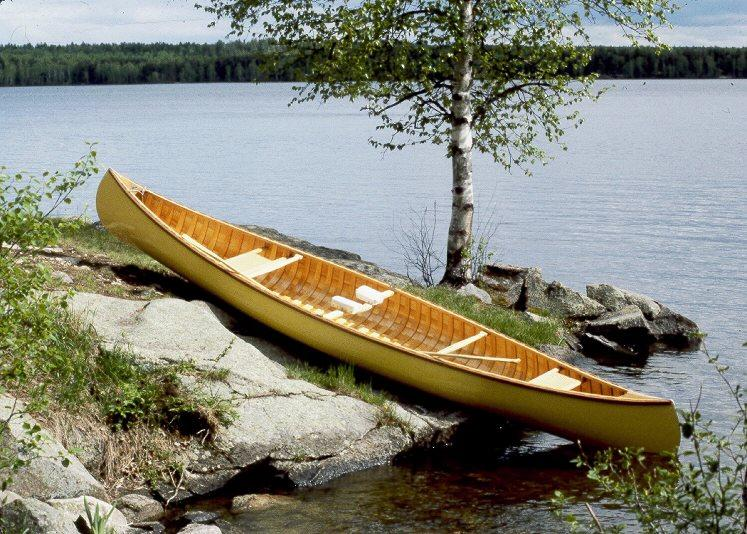
A wood-and-canvas canoe built by Joe Seliga

Joe Seliga (11 April 1911 – 18 December 2005) was a master builder of wood-and-canvas canoes in Ely, Minnesota.

Joe Seliga was born to Steve and Anna (Vasko) Seliga in Ely, Minnesota and graduated from Ely Memorial High School. Seliga was inspired by the Morris canoes, which were built by B.N. Morris Canoe Company of Veazie, Maine from 1887 to 1920. As a child, Seliga's family owned two Morris canoes, a 15-foot and an 18-foot. His first experience in canoe construction came when his family's 18-foot canoe was severely damaged, requiring twenty-one new ribs and a new cover. Seliga built his first canoe form and completed his first canoe in 1938, which he immediately sold.

Seliga built canoes from before World War II until his death at the age of 94, only stopping from 1942 to 1945, when he was forced to work as a miner. He worked in the Zenith Mine and at Reserve Mining. Over his career, he built 621 canoes, 237 of which were sold to the YMCA, Boundary Waters Canoe Area Wilderness and Quetico Provincial Park.

Seliga's wife, Nora, also assisted in building canoes.

In Jerry Stelmok's book, The Art of the Canoe with Joe Seliga, Sam Cook's foreword reads in part:

They are tucked away all over the north country. Hung carefully in garages. Resting on beams in boathouses. Stowed away in sheds. Seliga canoes. Elegant, practical canoes crafted by the hands of Joe and Nora Seliga. Seligas, with their gleaming ribs the color of honey. Seligas, with their perfectly upswept bows. Seligas, built for the rigors of travel in the Minnesota-Ontario border country. I do not know how many canoes Joe Seliga has built. That doesn't matter. It was never a numbers thing with Joe. It was a matter of getting the right materials and taking the time to build a boat he was satisfied to put his nameplate on.

On February 4, 1994, a fire destroyed Seliga's shop. However, by that September, he had begun building canoes again.

Seliga sold many canoes to Camp Widjiwagan, the St. Paul, Minnesota YMCA camp, outside Ely. Upon his death, Camp Widjiwagan received Seliga's canoe form.

In the early 2000s, Bell Canoe Works began manufacturing the 'Bell Seliga', a Kevlar canoe based on the Seliga form. The Seliga is now offered by Northstar Canoes (owned by Ted Bell).
