= Camp Widjiwagan =

YMCA camp in Minnesota, United States

Coordinates: 47°59′56″N 91°57′7″W

Camp Widjiwagan is a YMCA camp based on Burntside Lake near Ely, Minnesota, United States, with a focus on providing wilderness tripping and education to teens ages 11-18.

== Mission ==
The mission of Camp Widjiwagan is "to develop, in young people, respect for self, community, and the environment, through wilderness adventure and environmental education."

== History ==
Camp Widjiwagan was founded in 1929 by Julian Kirby with the permission of the YMCA as an all-boys wilderness camp. In 1947 it held its first sessions for girls. Since its founding it has gained national recognition for its excellent canoeing and backpacking programs. Since 1973 it has also run a strong environmental education program, called the Widjiwagan Outdoor Learning Program.

When the YMCA purchased Camp Du Nord in 1961 and Camp Northland in 1981, Camp Widjiwagan helped set them up as YMCA centers on Burntside Lake.

== Wilderness Tripping Program ==
The wilderness tripping program at Widjiwagan runs from June through August and works with youth from the ages of 11 to 18. Two types of trips are offered: canoeing and backpacking. There are a progression of trips in both canoeing and backpacking, as the age and skill level of a camper increase. The trips are single-sex and feature a high ratio of staff to youth, as high as 1 to 2 on the introductory trips, though a ratio of 1 to 5 is more common. The program offers standard, open-enrolled trips as well as by-invitation advanced trips for experienced campers.

The canoeing progression is as follows:

| Trip Title | Travel time in days | Typical age of participants | Destination | By invitation: |
|---|---|---|---|---|
| Pathfinder | 1-2 | 10-12 | BWCA | No |
| Intro | 5-8 | 12-13 | BWCA | No |
| Boundary Waters | 8-9 | 13-14 | BWCA | No |
| Quetico | 10-14 | 14-15 | Quetico Provincial Park | No |
| Explorer | 21 | 16 | Crown Lands, Quetico, BWCA | Yes |
| Advanced Explorer | 29 | 17 | Manitoba and Ontario Rivers | Yes |
| Voyageur | 35-40 | 18 | Nunavut and Northwest Territories | Yes |

In 1972, a parallel backpacking program was started. Backpacking trips follow a similar progression to the canoeing trips, except that time spent on trail is typically 2-3 days shorter, due to the need for travel days to and from camp.

| Trip Title | Travel time in days | Typical age of participants | Destination | By invitation: |
|---|---|---|---|---|
| Pathfinder | 1-2 | 10-12 | BWCA | No |
| Intro | 5-6 | 12-13 | Porcupine Mountains | No |
| Bighorn Mountain | 8-9 | 13-14 | Bighorn Mountains | No |
| Rocky Mountain | 8-9 | 14-15 | Absaroka–Beartooth Wilderness | No |
| Explorer | 17 | 16 | Wind River Range,Absaroka–Beartooth Wilderness | Yes |
| Advanced Explorer | 24 | 17 | Willmore Wilderness Park, Jasper National Park | Yes |
| Mountaineer | 35-40 | 18 | Brooks Range | Yes |

== Environmental Education ==
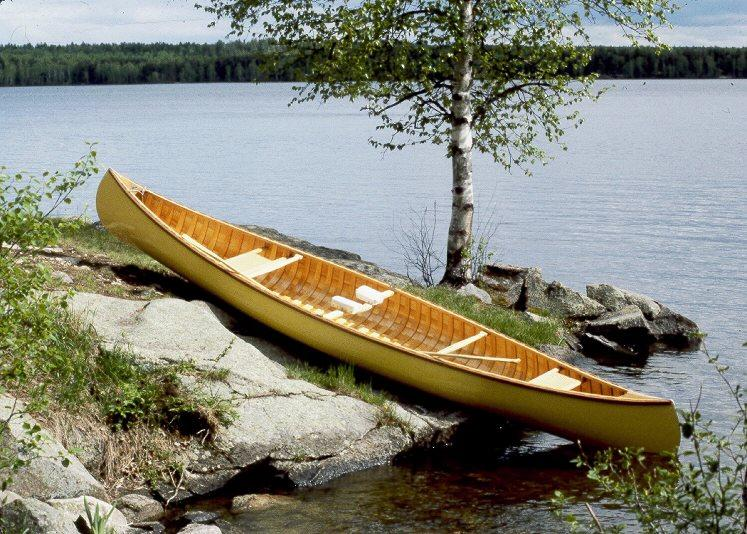
Canoe built by Joe Seliga

Camp Widjiwagan also has an Environmental Education Program during the fall, winter and spring seasons. This program, started in 1973, allows schools to send up groups of students to the camp for a week. During this week, campers undergo some basic environmental education, including studying wilderness survival, plant and tree identification, basic hiking skills, and more. During the winter months, classes include animal tracking, the night sky, snowshoeing, and cross-country skiing.

== Notable alumni/staff/friends ==
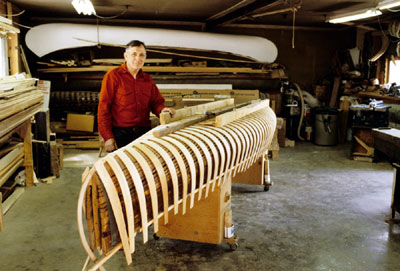
Joe Seliga in workshop

- Ann Bancroft
- Joe Seliga
- Andrew Shue

== Other Camps with the same name ==
- Camp Widjiwagan, located on Lake Springfield in Springfield, Illinois, used primarily by girl scouts
- YMCA Camp Widjiwagan located on Percy Priest Lake in Nashville, Tennessee

== See also ==
- YMCA
