= E.H. Gerrish Canoe Company =

First person to sell wood-canvas canoes

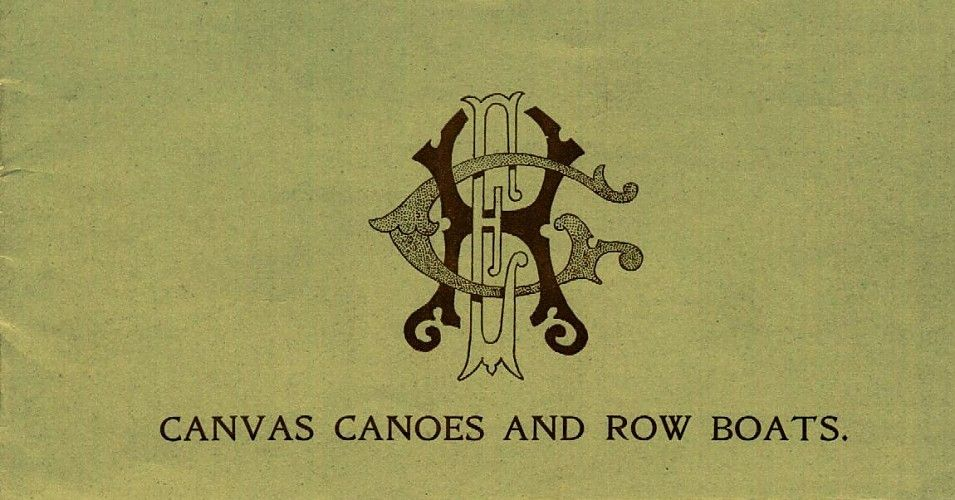
cover of E.H. Gerrish catalog dated 1898

E.H. Gerrish (1847–1930) is credited with being the first person to sell wood-canvas canoes commercially. From 1882 to 1909, Gerrish built and sold canoes from a shop in Bangor, Maine. Early Gerrish canoes contain elements of the birchbark canoes upon which they were based. If studied from earliest-to-latest, the canoes of E.H. Gerrish appear to show the morphing of the wood-canvas from its roots in the birch bark to the modern open gunwale canoe.

== History ==
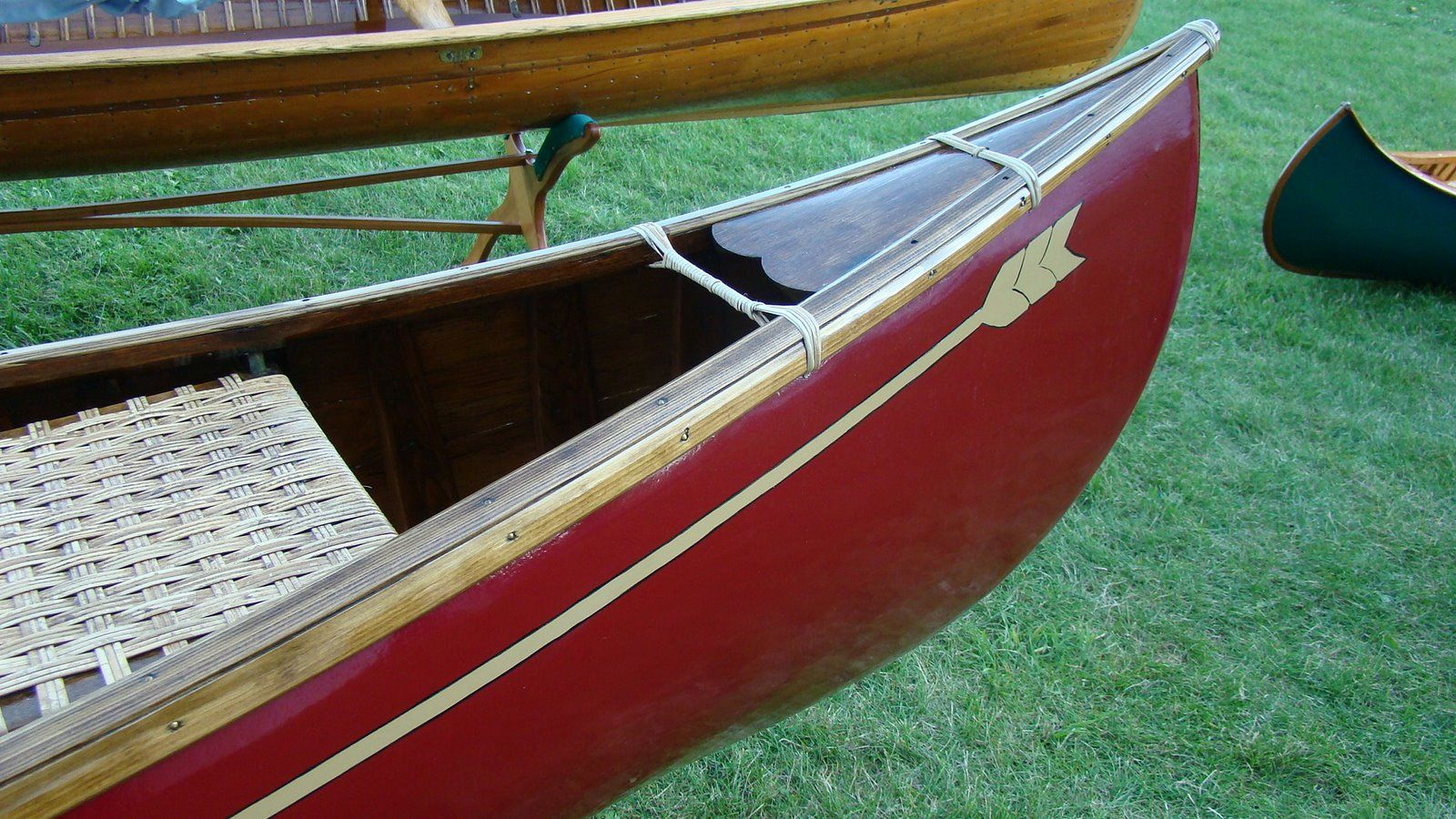
Gerrish canoe with classic heart-shaped deck

Evan Hughes “Eve” Gerrish is credited with being the first person to sell wood-canvas canoes commercially. Born in Brownville, Maine, in 1847, Eve Gerrish was an established hunting and fishing guide when he moved to Bangor in 1875, set up shop manufacturing fishing rods and canoe paddles and began experimenting with wood-canvas canoe construction. Canvas had been used to patch leaks in bark canoes, and native people had experimented with the use of canvas in canoe-building as the supply of usable birch bark became depleted with the rise in interest in use of the canoe for sporting activities. These early canvas-covered canoes were built without metal fastenings and, as with bark canoes, they were built from the outside-in—the reverse of the later practice of building over a form or mold.

By 1878, Gerrish was producing eighteen canoes a year and by 1882 hired his first employee. In 1884 he was producing over 50 canoes annually. That year, Gerrish exhibited his canoes in New Orleans at the World Cotton Centennial. As the advantages of the canvas covered canoe became evident to a public interested in a replacement for the more difficult to obtain and maintain bark canoe, others entered the canoe-building market and contributed to the advancement of the manufacturing process.

I saw a man by the name of Evan Gerrish of Bangor riding in the Penobscot River in a canvas-covered canoe. I quickly saw the advantages of that kind over my birchbark, which more-over leaked. I examined the canoe closely, and in a short time was able to produce one which was so good someone wanted to buy it.

E.M. White eventually opened a canoe shop in Old Town, Maine.

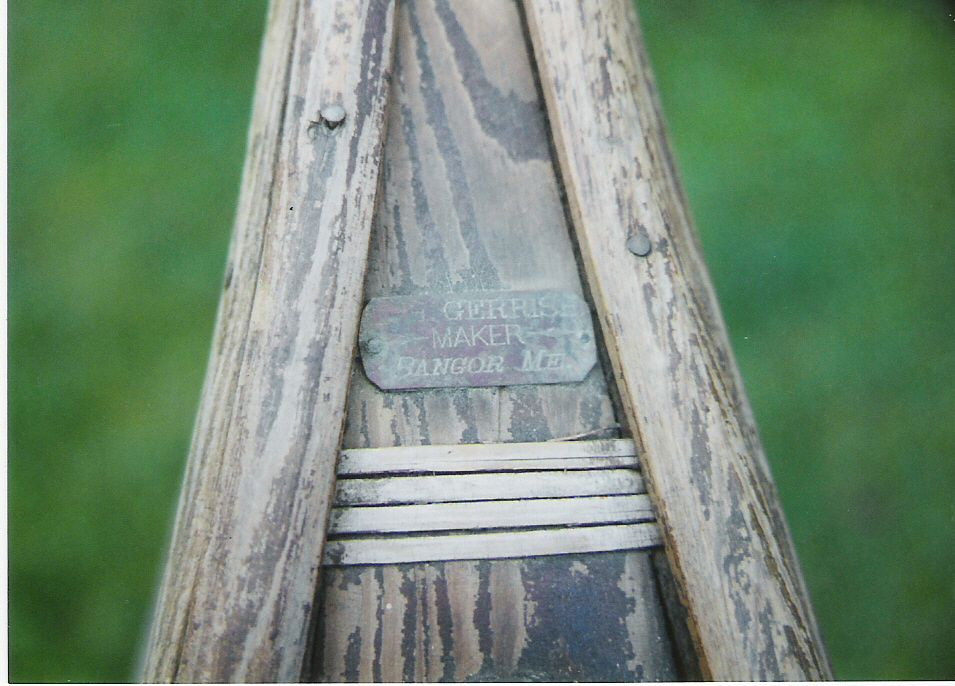
nameplate on a Gerrish canoe

Gerrish canoes were exhibited at World’s Columbian Exposition in 1893. An economic depression known as the Panic of 1893 may have worked to the advantage of canvas canoe builders such as Gerrish: wooden boat builder J.H. Rushton nearly went bankrupt after investing in the promotion of his boats at this event, while the less expensive and easily maintained canvas canoe continued to grow in popularity throughout the 1890s. Gerrish continued to build canoes until retiring in 1909 at the age of 62, selling the company to his foreman, Herbert Walton. Walton moved the company to his hometown of Costigan, Maine, where he continued to use the Gerrish name on his canoes but changed the name tag to reflect the new location of Costigan. Production of the canoes slowly declined until the shop finally closed around 1930.

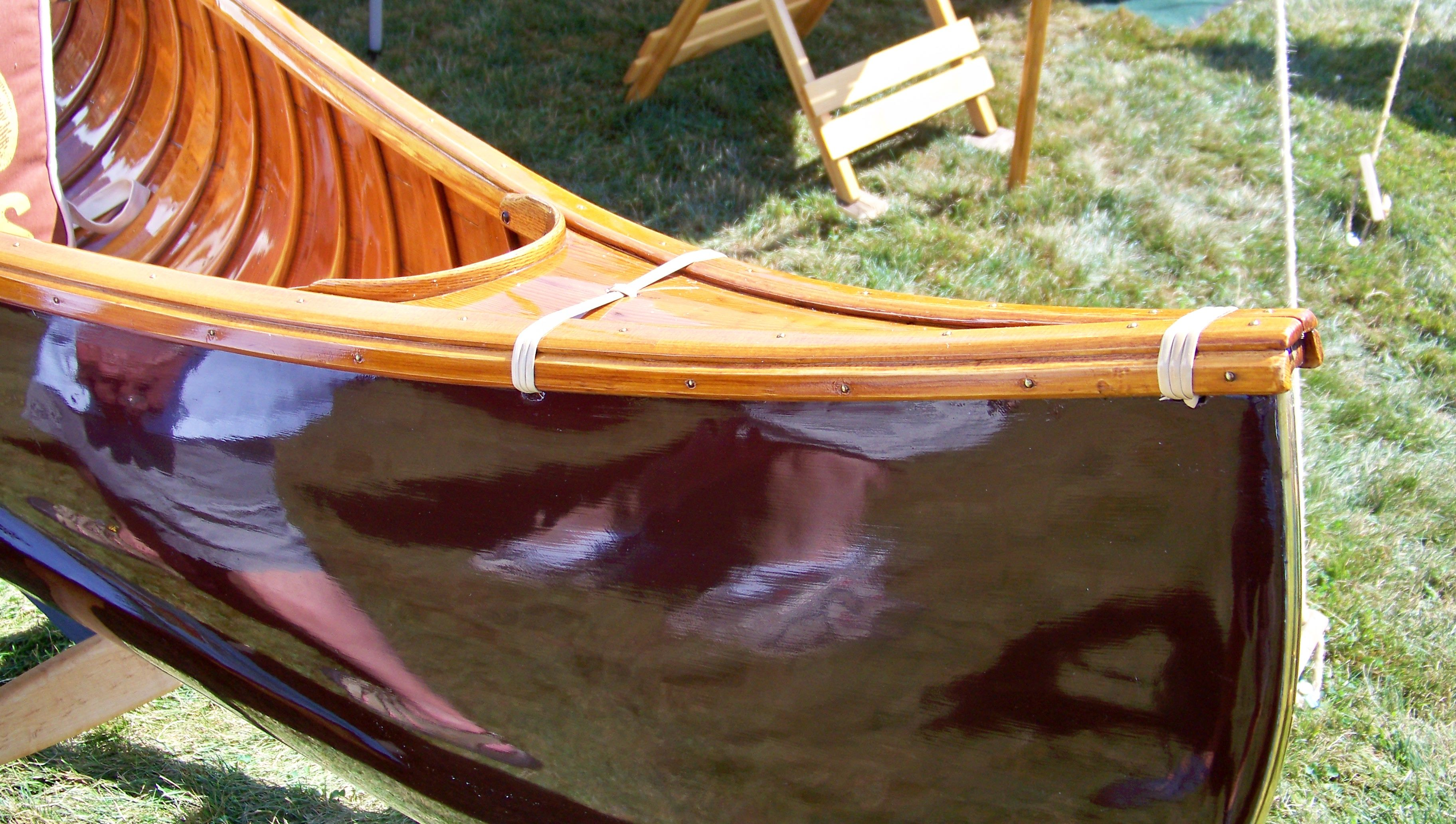
Gerrish canoe with alternate deck style

== The Gerrish Canoe ==
- A metal nameplate is affixed to bow deck of some Gerrish canoes, stating E.H. Gerrish/Maker/Bangor ME. This wording is also occasionally seen stenciled on the canoe's planking.
- A Gerrish canoe may or may not have a serial number. No company records are known to exist, and there is currently no way to determine the age of a Gerrish canoe based upon a serial number.
- Existing examples of Gerrish canoes suggest Eve Gerrish continued to refine his design throughout the years that he produced canoes. Among surviving examples, it is unusual to find any two that are completely alike.
- Initially, it is likely Gerrish produced canvas canoes built in the manner of the birch bark, without the use of a form, although no examples are known to survive. While his system of building canvas canoes evolved to employ European boat building methods, Gerrish incorporated a nod to the Native-built canoe when he used cane to simulate spruce root lashings and carrying devices. This is seen on canoes presumed to be pre-1900.

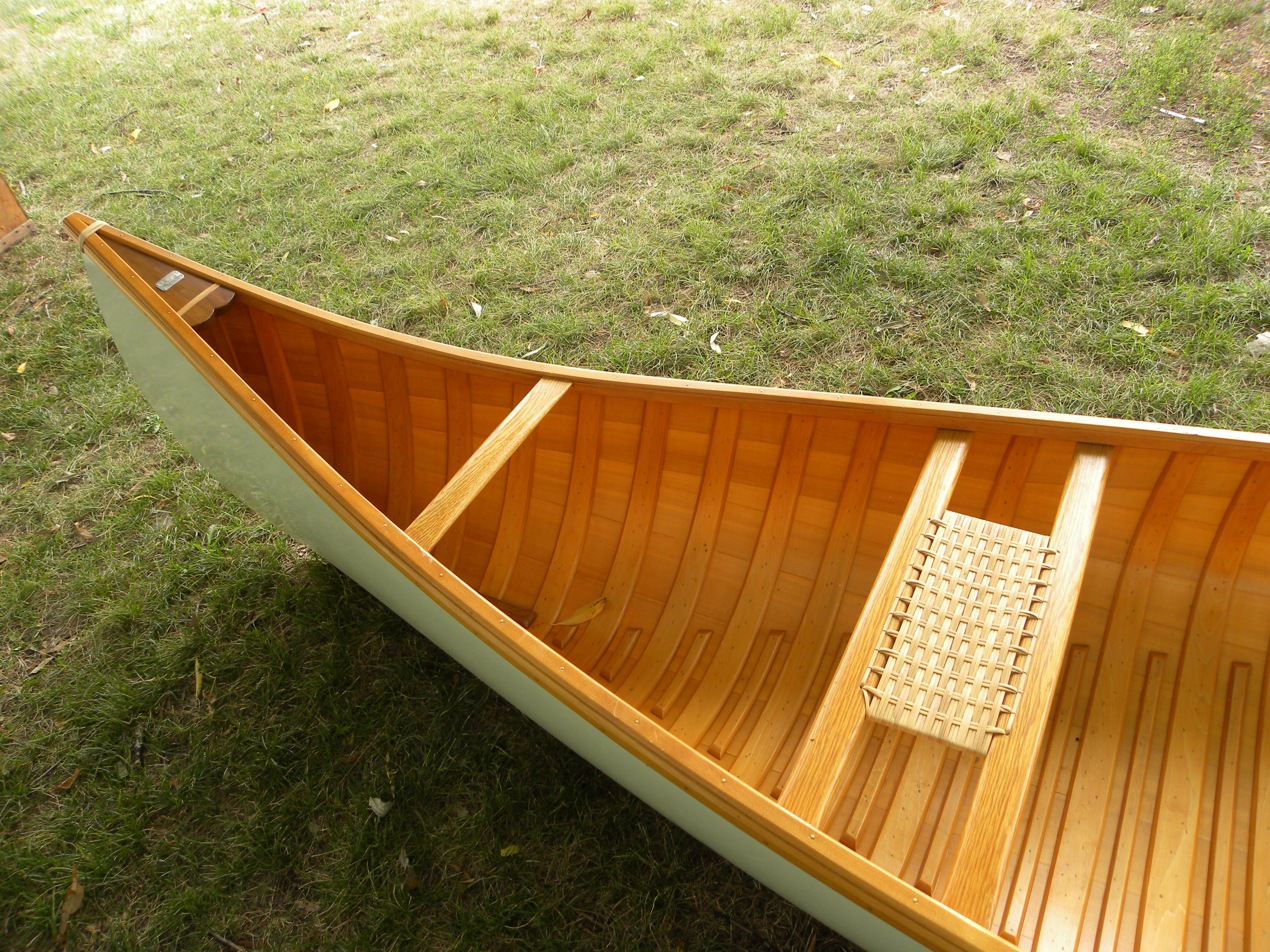
Pre-1900 Gerrish with typical reed seat, mortised carry-thwart and cane detailing on the deck

- The thwarts of earlier Gerrish canoes are often found mortised into the inwales, as with the traditional bark canoe, and some might have no seats. Some Gerrish canoes also have seats that are mortised into the inwale. Some canoes have mortised thwarts and seats that are hung from the inwales rather than mortised into them.
- The rails of early Gerrish canoes extend beyond the stems and are “lashed” at the ends with cane or bound with leather .
- Seat frames and reed-weaving are distinctive and seen on early as well as post-1900 Gerrish canoes.
- Late Gerrish canoes, dating from 1905-1909, may have a more “modern” look, with open gunwales that do not extend beyond the stems. Gerrish open gunwale canoes contain the additional detail of half-round trim laid the full length of the rails at the edge of the inwale and the outwale.

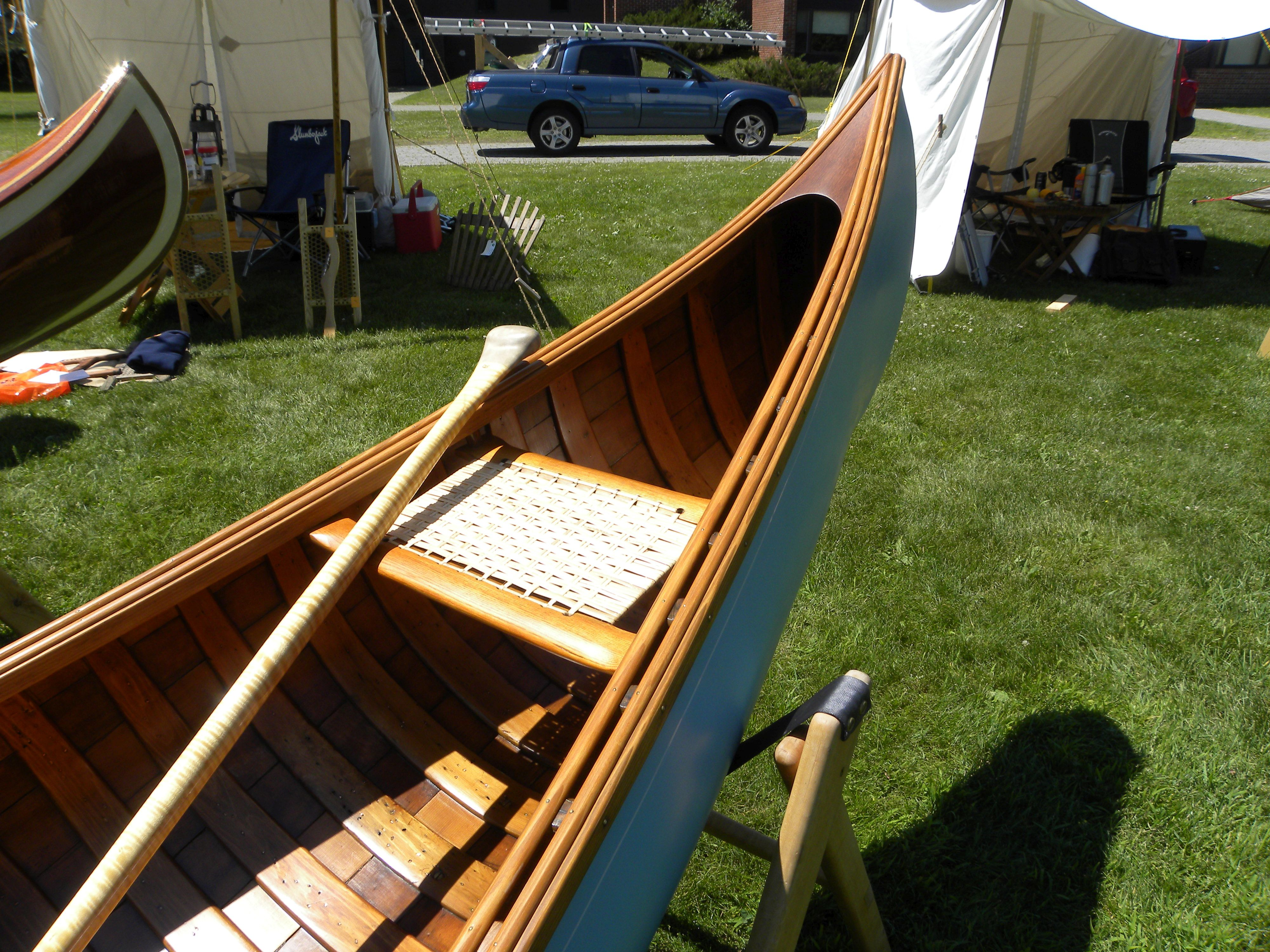
Open gunwale Gerrish canoe, c.1905-1909: note beading along inwale and outwale

- The decks of a Gerrish canoe are found to vary from a primitive heart-shape, to a traditionally-lobed heart, to a simple curve that may or may not be trimmed with coaming.
- Wood species used on decks, thwarts, and seat frames may be American chestnut.
