= E.M. White Canoe Company =

The E.M. White Canoe Company was founded by Edwin White, who produced wood and canvas canoes from 1889 into the 1940s. White is considered one of the pioneers of wood and canvas canoe building and one of several prominent canoe builders in Maine.

== Background ==
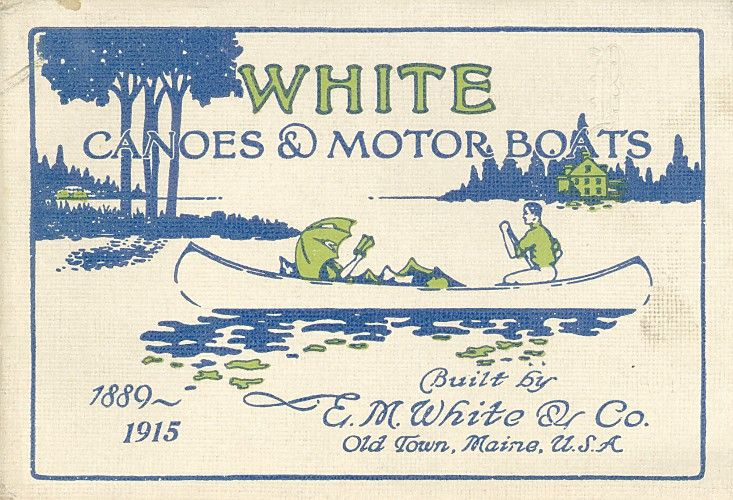
cover of 1915 E.M. White catalog

The company's construction methods evolved from the manufacture of birchbark canoes. The transition occurred in the 19th century when canoe builders in the Eastern United States and Ontario, Canada, laid canvas instead of bark into a traditional building bed. Later, builders in Maine adapted English boat-building inverted-forms technology, whereby an external waterproofed canvas shell was fastened to a wooden hull formed with white cedar planks and ribs.

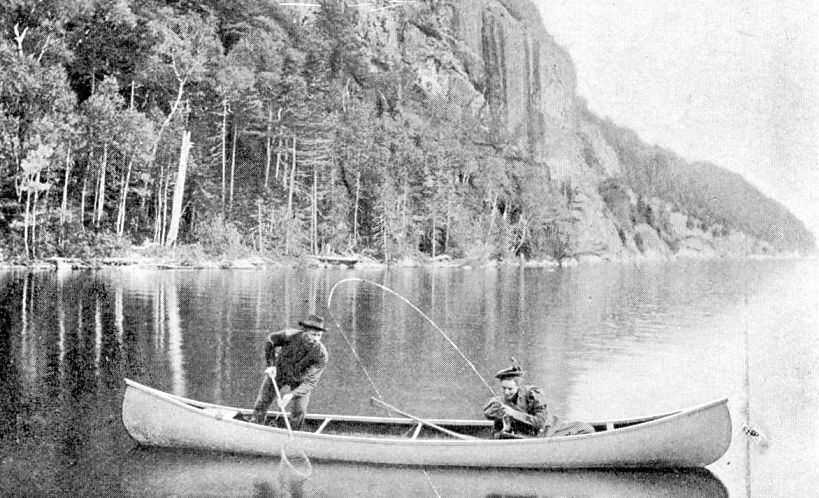
Fishing from an EM White canoe

The earliest commercial builder of wood-and-canvas canoe may have been Evan H. Gerrish of Bangor, Maine, a hunting and fishing guide from Brownville, Maine. Upriver at Gilman Falls, E.M. White started producing canoes in 1889. White gave an interview in 1901 in the Old Town Enterprise, saying: "I saw a man by the name of Evan Gerrish of Bangor riding in the Penobscot River in a canvas-covered canoe. I quickly saw the advantages of that kind over my birchbark, which moreover leaked. I examined the canvas canoe closely, and in a short time was able to produce one which was so good someone wanted to buy it."

White started building canoes at his Gilman Falls family home by boiling wooden ribs in his mother's washtub and using a horse on a treadmill for power. In 1895, White's brother George and Alfred E. Wickett were working for him. Wickett would go on to help start the Indian Old Town Canoe Company (later the Old Town Canoe Company), and founded the Penobscot Canoe Company and St. Louis Meramec Canoe Company. White's brother-in-law, E.L. Hinckley, became a working partner and provided the capital to open a large shop in Old Town, Maine in 1896, the town where Old Town Canoe would be established in the early twentieth century.

After World War Two, Walter King, one of White’s employees, and his brother-in-law Pat Farnsworth purchased the company and changed the name to White Canoe Company and began to build fiberglass canoes. The company was purchased by The Old Town Canoe Company in 1984.

== Identifying features ==
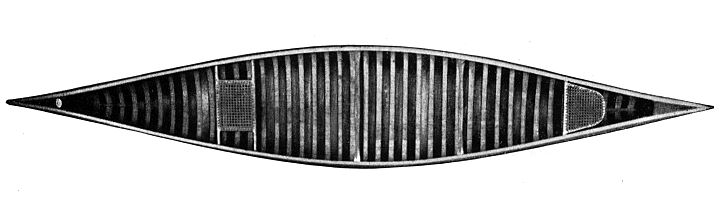
image from 1915 catalog showing D-shaped rear seat

White employed a variety of deck styles, from a simple triangular shape to an inverted heart.

Planking is often bevel-edged.

The stern seat on earlier Whites is steam-bent in a "D" shape.

The tips of the inwales, deck, and outwales extend an inch or so beyond the top of the stem.

== See also ==
- Miller, Daniel and Benson Gray, editors, The Historic Wood Canoe and Boat Manufacturer Catalog Collection, on CD-ROM.
