= Fire Station No. 1 (Duluth, Minnesota) =

- Engine House No. 1
- U.S. National Register of Historic Places
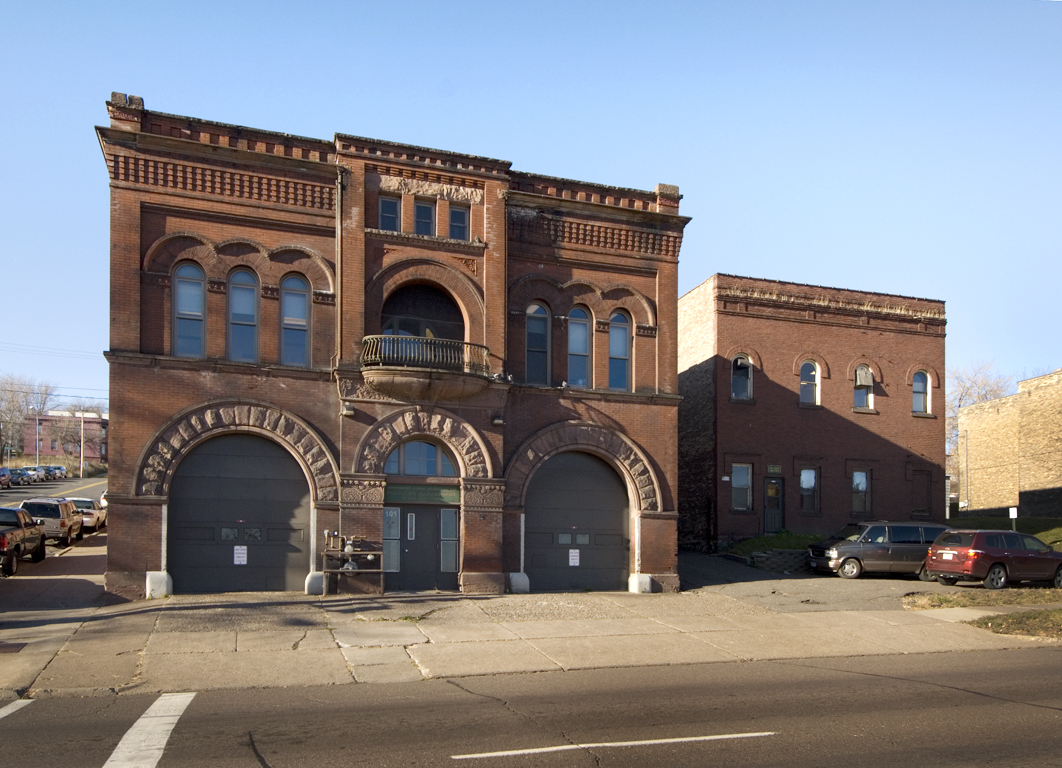
- Fire Station No. 1 viewed from the south

- Location within Minnesota Location within the United States
- Location: 101 E. 3rd Street, Duluth, Minnesota
- Coordinates: 46°47′25″N 92°6′1″W
- Area: Less than one acre
- Built: 1889
- Architect: Francis W. Fitzpatrick & Oliver G. Traphagen
- Architectural style: Romanesque Revival
- NRHP reference No.: 75002089 (original); 11001040 (increase)

Significant dates
- Added to NRHP: May 12, 1975
- Boundary increase: January 5, 2012

Fire Station No. 1 is a former fire station in the Central Hillside neighborhood of Duluth, Minnesota, United States. The two-building complex was constructed in 1889. It was one of the first fire stations in Duluth, built as the city transitioned from a volunteer fire department to a professional municipal agency. The station consists of a Romanesque Revival engine house and a plainer stable/shop building which wraps around it in an L.

Fire Station No. 1 was redesignated Station No. 3 in 1897. In 1910 the Duluth Fire Department constructed a new headquarters nine blocks away. As the department acquired its tenth gas-powered fire engine near the end of that same decade, response times had decreased to the point that there was no need for another station so close to headquarters. The original Fire Station No. 1 was closed on March 1, 1918. The complex was transferred to the city's public works department as a maintenance and storage facility. No longer needed, the station's original bell tower was removed at this time. Sometime between 1925 and 1940 a second-floor passageway was added between the engine house and the shop building. In 1953 the complex was sold to Duluth Public Schools, which used it as a maintenance and storage facility for the rest of the 20th century. In 2012 the two buildings were redeveloped into an affordable housing complex.

The engine house was initially listed on the National Register of Historic Places as Engine House No. 1 in 1975 for its local significance in the themes of architecture and social history. It was nominated as an example of Duluth's late-19th-century fire stations and a component of the city's formative municipal services. The nomination was updated in 2012 to recognize the stable/shop building as part of the listing.

== Gallery ==
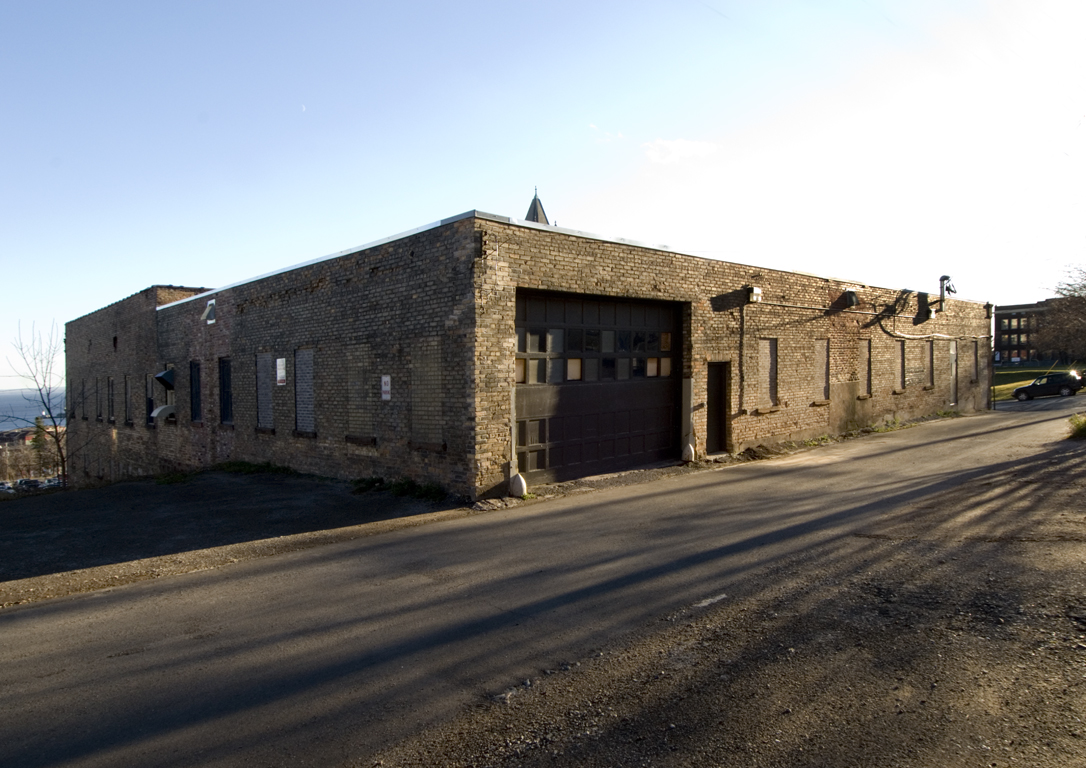
West rear and north side of Stable/Maintenance Building. View to south.

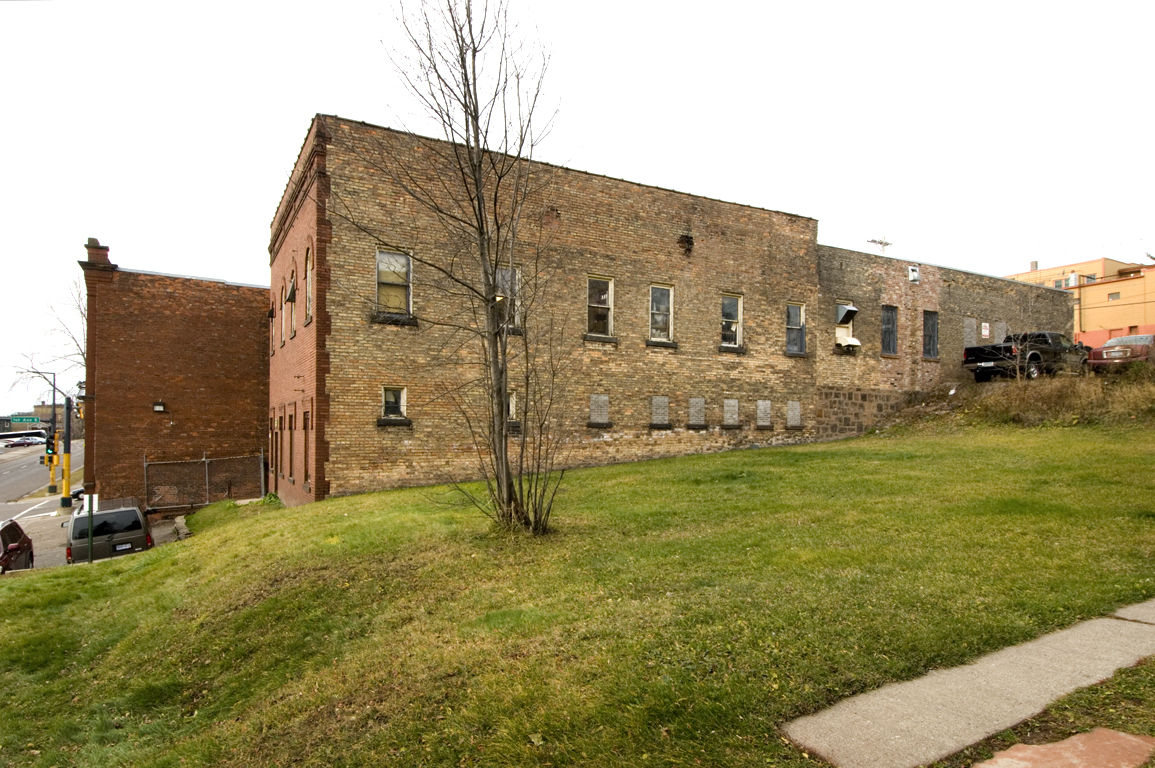
North side of buildings, with Stable/Maintenance Building in foreground and Engine House behind. View to southwest.

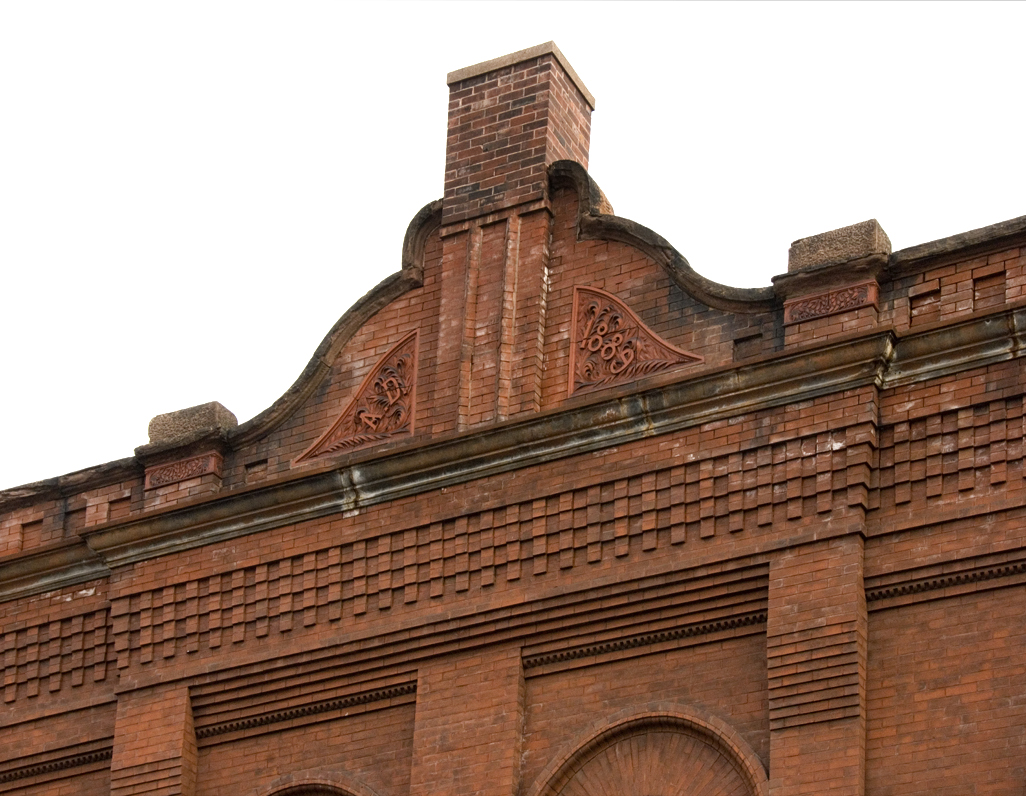
Detail of parapet and chimney on south side of Engine House.

== See also ==
- National Register of Historic Places listings in St. Louis County, Minnesota
