= Pittsburgh Plate Glass Company Detroit Warehouse =

- U.S. National Register of Historic Places
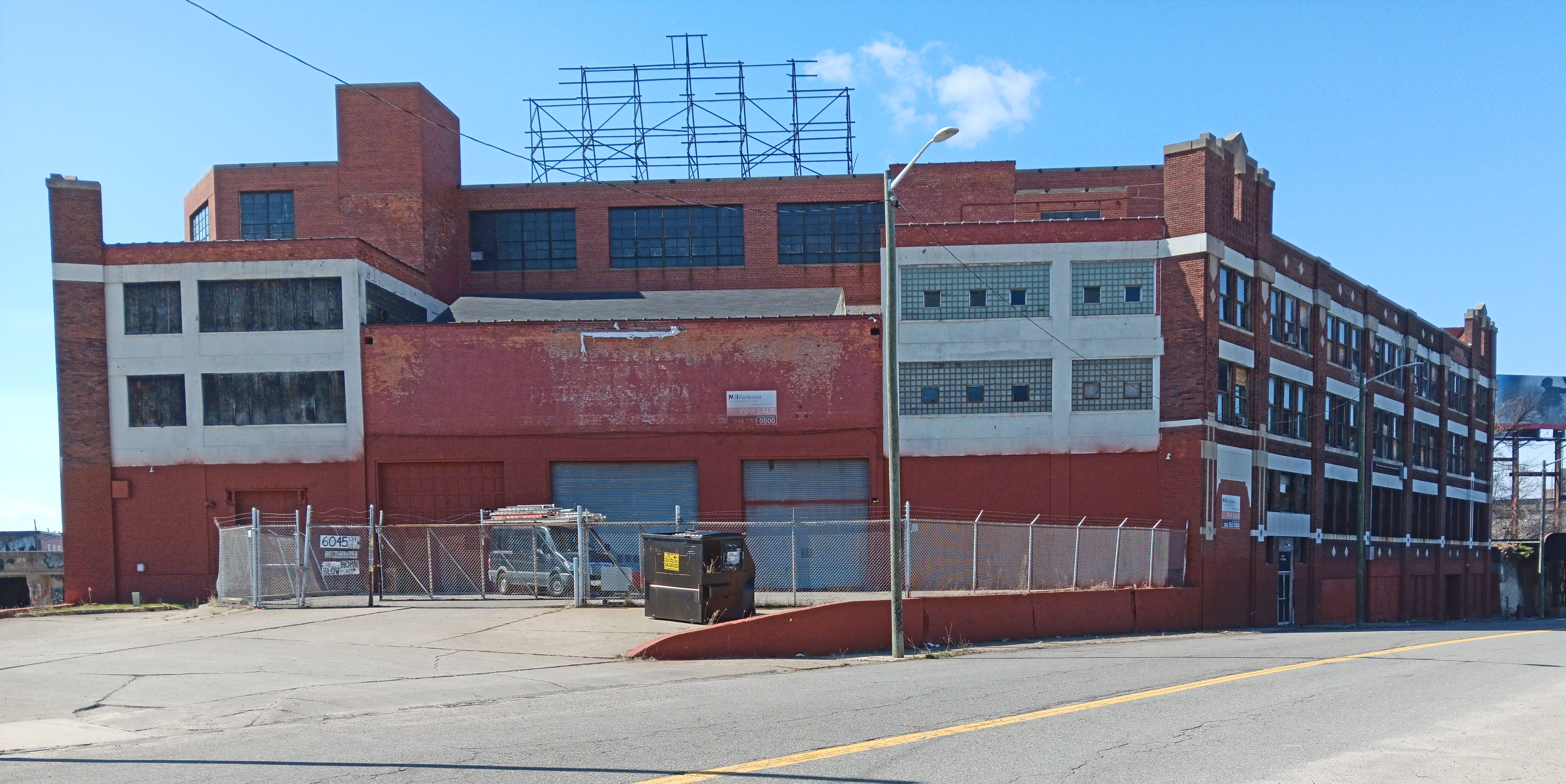
- Interactive map
- Location: 6045 John C. Lodge Service Dr. Detroit, Michigan
- Coordinates: 42°21′46″N 83°4′47″W
- Built: 1920
- Built by: E.V. Jackson Company
- Architect: Francis W. Fitzpatrick, Albert Kahn Associates
- Architectural style: Commercial Style
- NRHP reference No.: 100008812
- Added to NRHP: March 28, 2023

The Pittsburgh Plate Glass Company Detroit Warehouse is a warehouse located at 6045 John C. Lodge Service Drive in Detroit. It is the only known building in Michigan designed by architect Francis W. Fitzpatrick. It was listed on the National Register of Historic Places in 2023.

== History ==
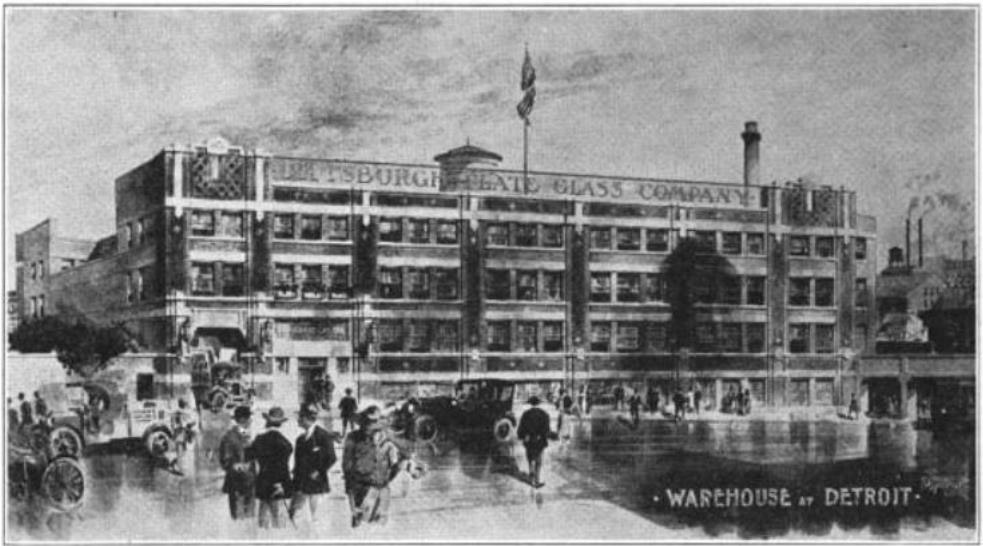
Pittsburg Plate Glass Warehouse Detroit, 1922 illustration

The Pittsburgh Plate Glass Company had a presence in Detroit in the late 19th century, with offices located on Jefferson Avenue. In 1907, the company moved to Larned Street, staying there until this warehouse building was constructed. In 1920, the company chose a site on what was then Greenwood Street (now the John C. Lodge Freeway) to construct a new warehouse and office building. The site was convenient to the multiple railroads crossing Detroit, as well as the automobile factories in the nearby Piquette Avenue Industrial Historic District. The company commissioned Francis W. Fitzpatrick to design the building. He specifically designed the building to be fireproof.

In 1954, Albert Kahn Associates designed a fifth floor addition to the building. The Pittsburgh Plate Glass Company operated from this building until 1971.

== Description ==
The Pittsburgh Plate Glass Company Detroit Warehouse is a five-story, multi-tone red brick clad Commercial Style warehouse building with stone trim and details. The façade facing the Lodge Service Drive is seven bays wide, with windows that are predominantly double-hung one-over-one units. The bays are separated by brick piers, decorated with limestone diamonds and shield shapes. There are wide limestone bands at the tops of the second, third, and fourth floor windows, and another narrow limestone band at the second-floor windowsill line. The façade facing Holden Street is similar.
