= Oliver G. Traphagen =

American architect (1854–1932)

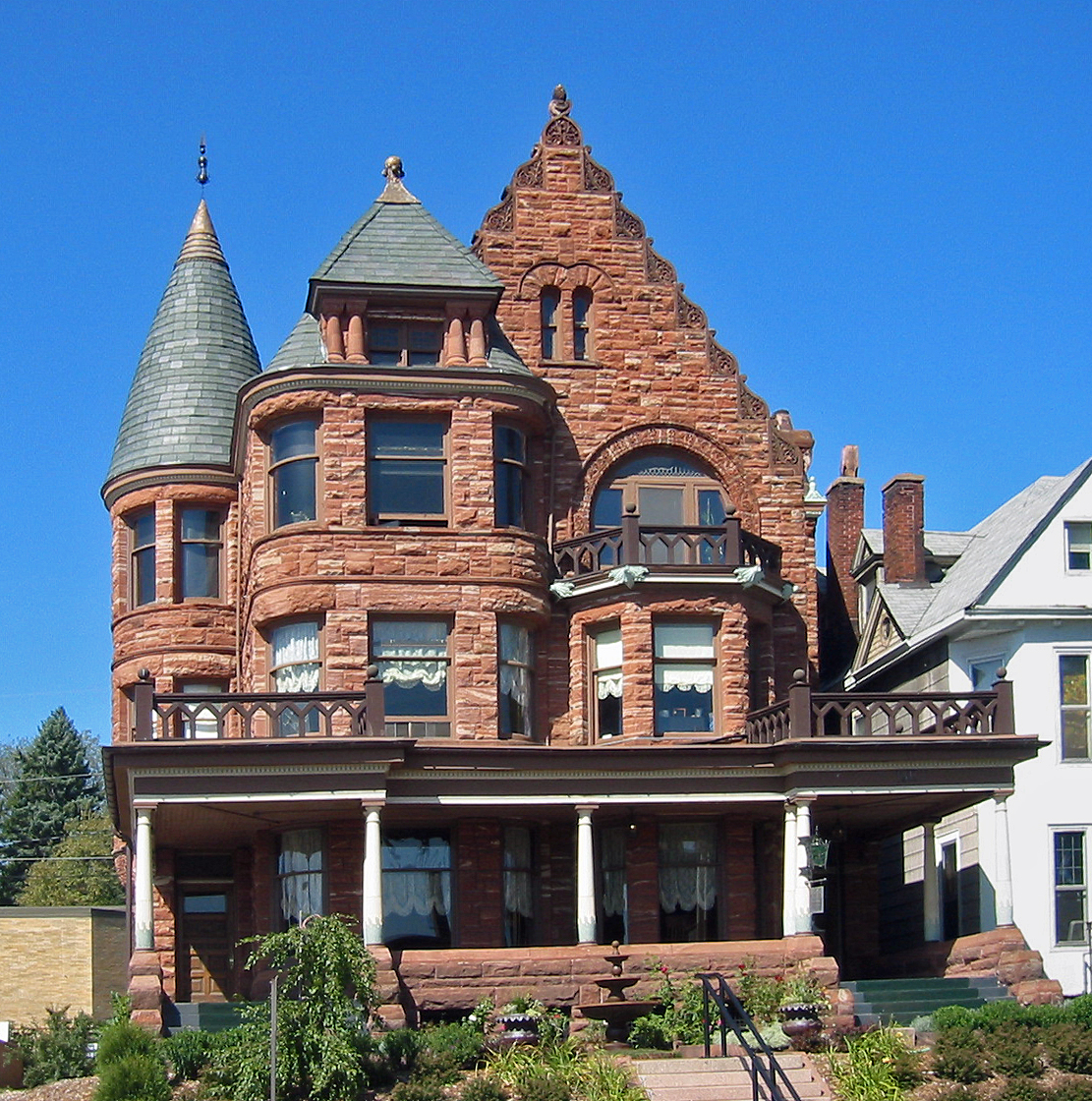
Oliver G. Traphagen House, Duluth, Minnesota (1892)

Oliver Green Traphagen (3 September 1854 – 21 October 1932) was an American architect who designed many notable buildings in Duluth, Minnesota, during the late 19th century and in the Territory of Hawaii during the early 20th century. Among his most famous landmarks are the Oliver G. Traphagen House in Duluth, called the Redstone, and the Moana Hotel in Honolulu, both of which are on the National Register of Historic Places, as are several other buildings he designed.

== Biography ==
He was born on 3 September 1854 in Tarrytown, New York.

In the 1870s Traphagen moved to St. Paul, Minnesota, with his parents where he worked as a carpenter, and later as an apprentice to the architect George Wirth. He moved north to Duluth in 1882, and soon became one of the city's first major architects. The 1880s were boom times in Duluth; the population was 30,000 in 1887 compared with 13,000 in 1883. Over the next fifteen years, either on his own or in partnership with Wirth (1884–1886) and later Francis W. Fitzpatrick (1889–1896), Traphagen designed buildings for both public and private owners, such as the First National Bank (1888), Turner Hall (1888), Wieland Block (1889), City Hall and Jail (1889), Fire Station No. 1 (1889), First Presbyterian Church (1891), and Duluth Central High School (1892). Many of Traphagen's designs show the influence of the Richardsonian Romanesque style that was popular at the time. Noted Duluth architect Frederick German worked as a draftsman for Traphagen and Fitzpatrick during this time.

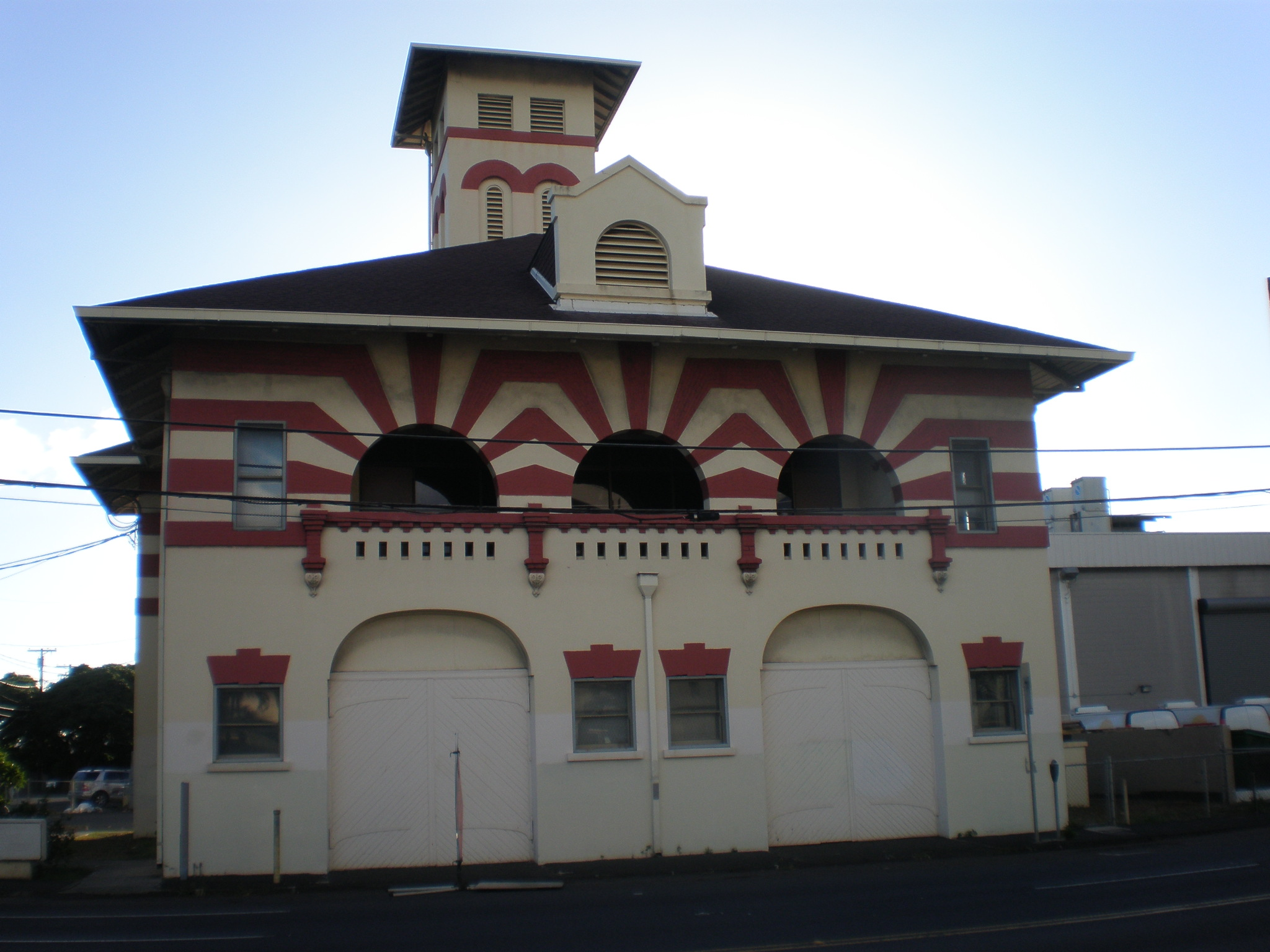
Palama Fire Station, Honolulu, Hawaii (1901)

Because his daughter's health required a warmer climate, the family relocated to the soon-to-be-annexed Republic of Hawaii in October 1897. Thanks to his previous work in Duluth he soon became "the most prolific and highly regarded architect in town." He designed the first building in the islands with a passenger elevator, the Judd Building (1898); the first hotel on Waikiki Beach, the Moana (1901); and the first public crematory in the Islands, at Oahu Cemetery (1906). As in Duluth, he also designed public works, such as the Kakaako Pumping Station (1900), Palama Fire Station (1901), and the Hawaiian State Archives Building (1906).

Two of his more exceptional buildings have not survived: the classical-style Hackfeld & Co. building downtown (1902) and the four-story James B. Castle home on Waikiki Beach. Among the last buildings he designed in Hawaii was the Punahou School president's home, which celebrated its 100th anniversary in December 2007. In 1907, he moved to Alameda, California, where he retired in 1925.

He died on 21 October 1932 in Alameda, California.

== Projects ==
- Pastoret Flats/Kozy Bar & Apartments, 129-131 East 1st Street, Duluth, MN, circa 1887 - Heavily damaged by fire on November 15, 2010 - (future and restoration uncertain)
- Christian H. Oppel Block, 115 E Superior St, Duluth, Minnesota, circa 1885. Attributed to Traphagen. Demolished circa 1987.
- Wirth Building, 13 W Superior St, Duluth, Minnesota, 1886. Attributed to Traphagen.
- First National Bank, Duluth, Minnesota, 1888. Demolished 1959
- Turner Hall, 601 E Third St, Duluth, Minnesota, 1888. Destroyed by fire 1890
- Matthew B. and Lucy Harrison House, 1889. Demolished 1935
- Wieland Block, Duluth, Minnesota, 1889
- Former Duluth City Hall and Jail, 132 and 126 E Superior St, Duluth, Minnesota, 1889
- Fire Station No. 1, N Corner of 1st Ave E and Third St, Duluth, Minnesota, 1889. Traphagen & Fitzpatrick
- Boiler House and smokestack, August J. Fitger's Brewery, 600 E Superior St, Duluth, Minnesota, 1890. Traphagen & Fitzpatrick
- Chester Terrace, 1210–1232 E First St, Duluth, Minnesota, 1890. Traphagen & Fitzpatrick
- First Presbyterian Church, 300 E Second St, Duluth, Minnesota, 1891. Traphagen & Fitzpatrick
- Duluth Central High School, 215 N. 1st Ave E., Duluth, Minnesota, 1891-92. Emmet S. Palmer and Lucien P. Hall, architects, and Traphagen.
- Munger Terrace, 405 Mesabi Ave, Duluth, Minnesota, 1891-92. Traphagen & Fitzpatrick
- Oliver G. Traphagen House, 1511 E Superior St, Duluth, Minnesota, 1892. Traphagen & Fitzpatrick
- Torrey Building, 314-316 W Superior St, Duluth, Minnesota, 1892. Traphagen & Fitzpatrick
- Duluth Board of Trade, 301 W First St, Duluth, Minnesota, 1894-95. Traphagen & Fitzpatrick
- Judd Building, corner of Merchant and Fort Sts, Honolulu, Hawaii, 1898
- Kakaako Pumping Station, 653 Ala Moana Blvd, Honolulu, Hawaii, 1900
- Moana Hotel, 2365 Kalakaua Ave, Honolulu, Hawaii, 1901
- Palama Fire Station, 879 N King St, Oahu (1901)
- President's Home at the Punahou School, 1907
- Kainalu, the beach house of James Bicknell Castle in Waikiki, 1902; demolished 1959
- 244-252 California Street, San Francisco, California, 1908

== Gallery ==
Traphagen designs

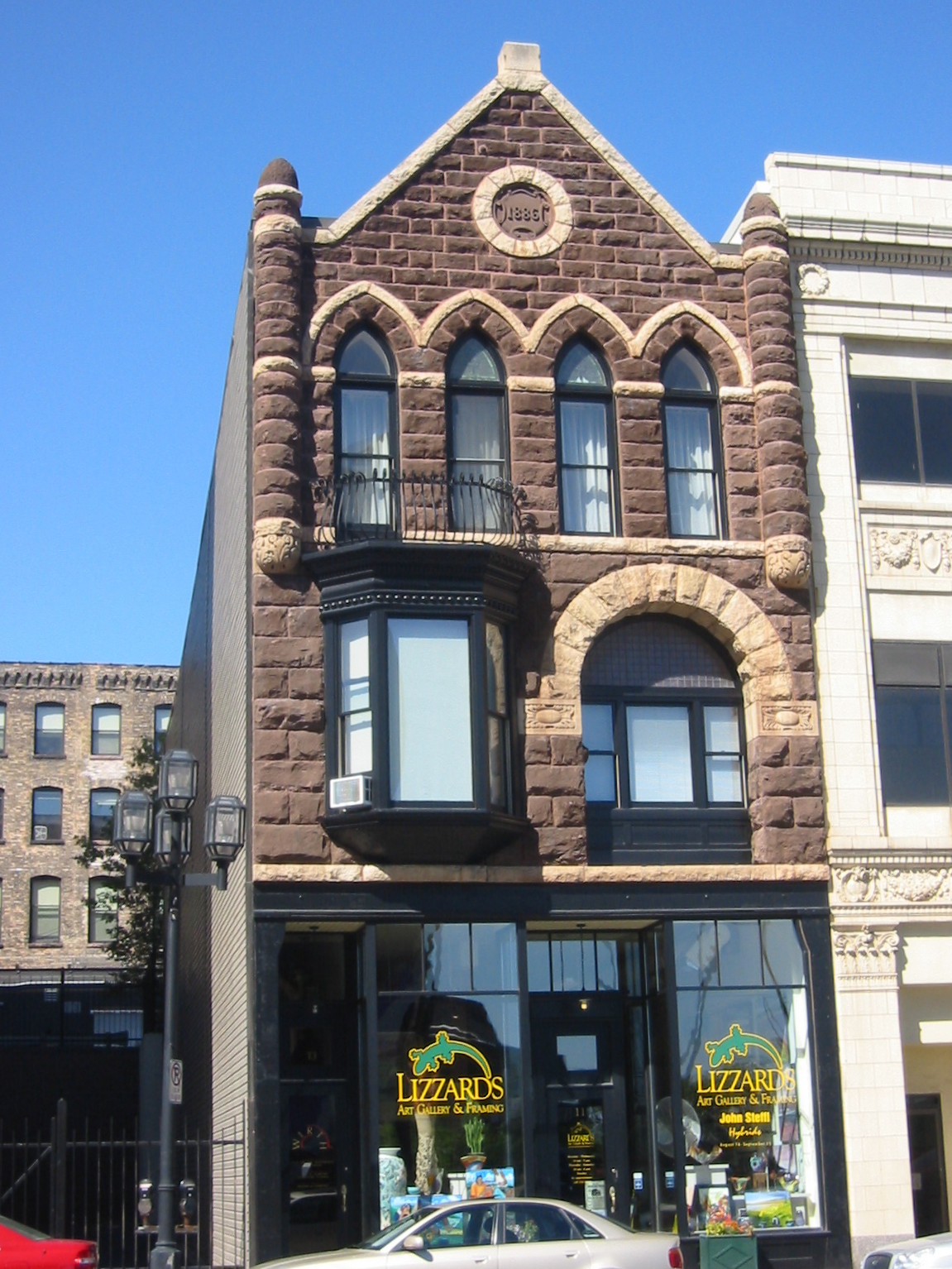
Max W. Wirth Pharmacy Building (1886)

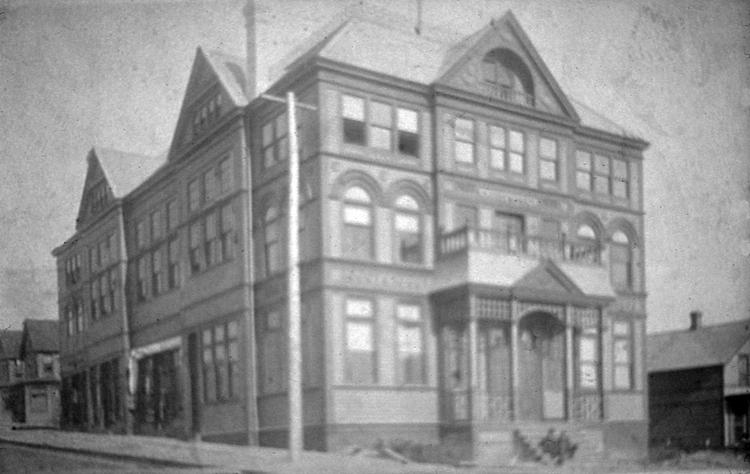
Turner Hall (1888)

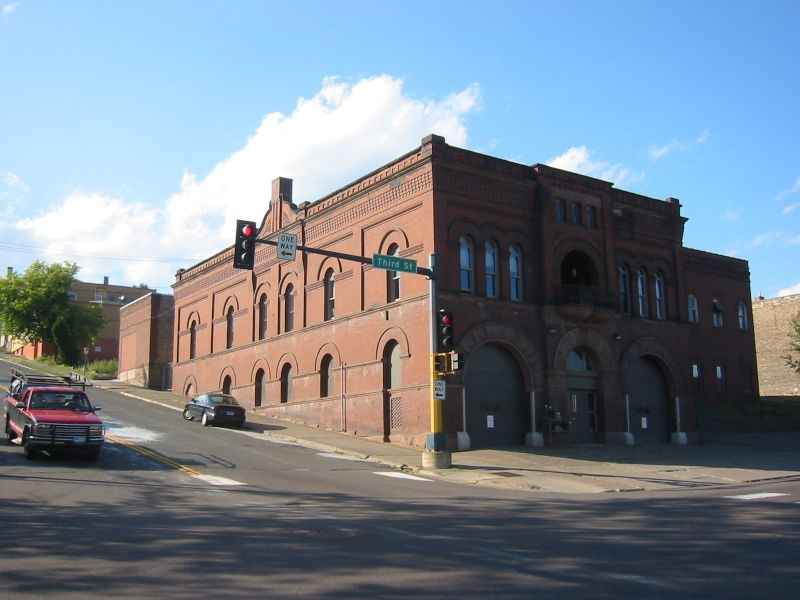
Fire Station No. 1 (1889)

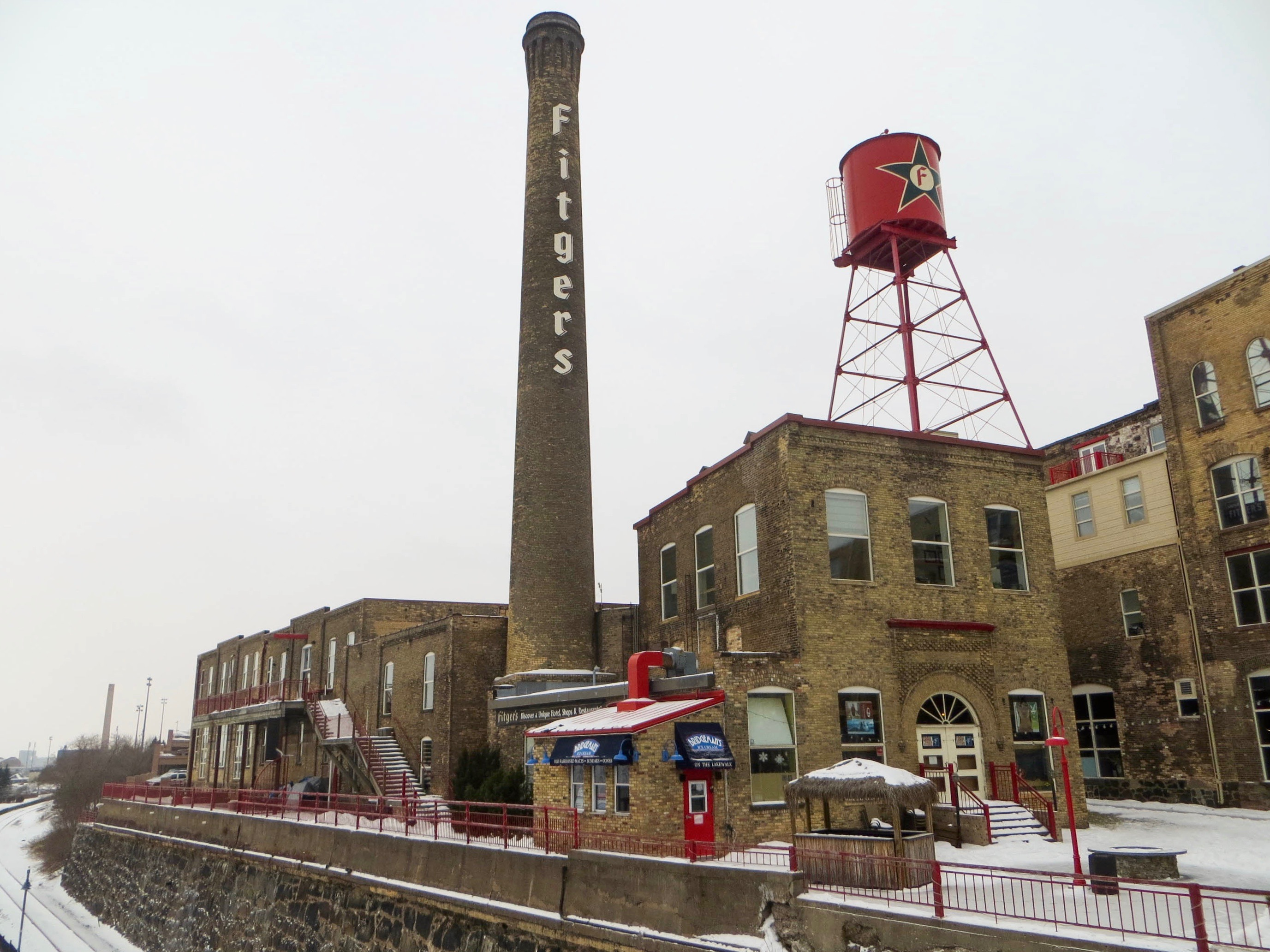
August J. Fitger's Brewery (1890)

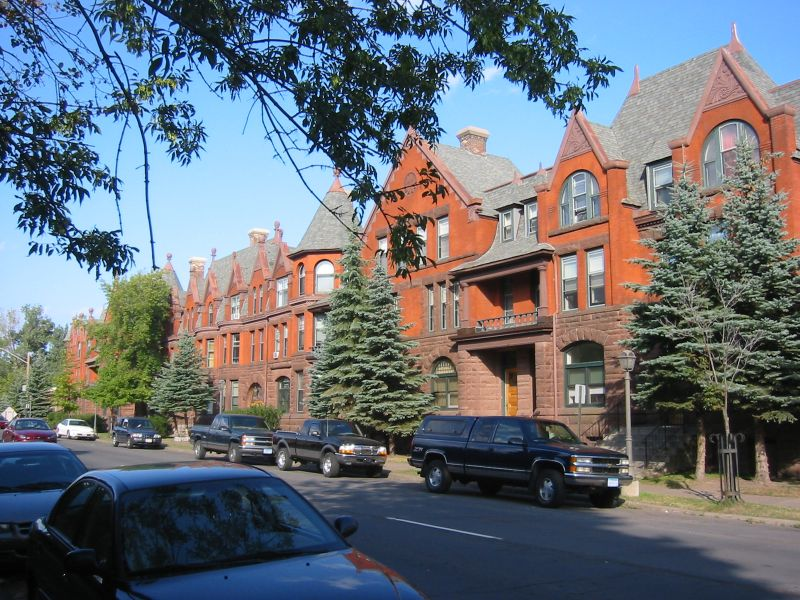
Chester Terrace (1890)

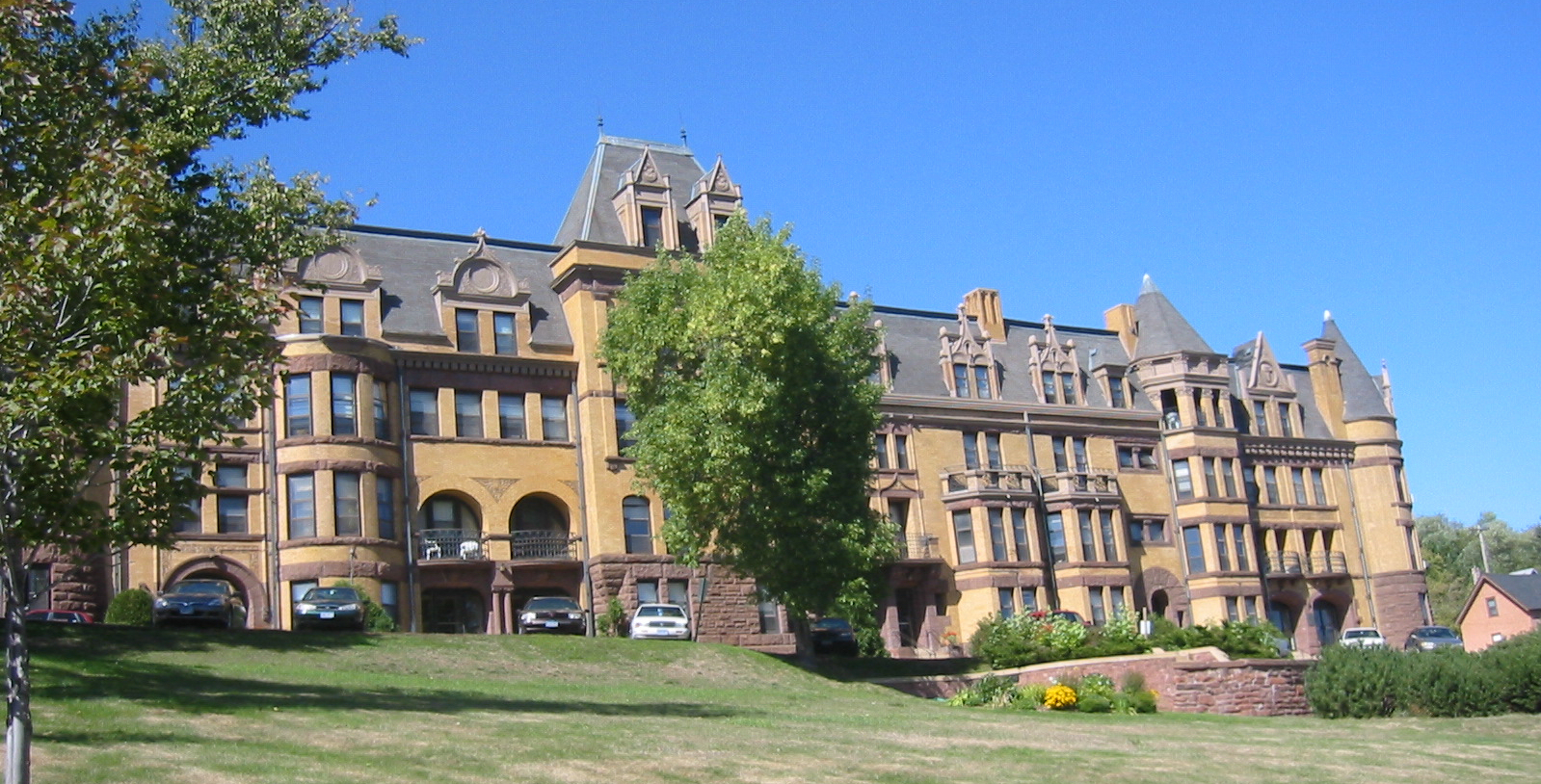
Munger Terrace (1891–92)

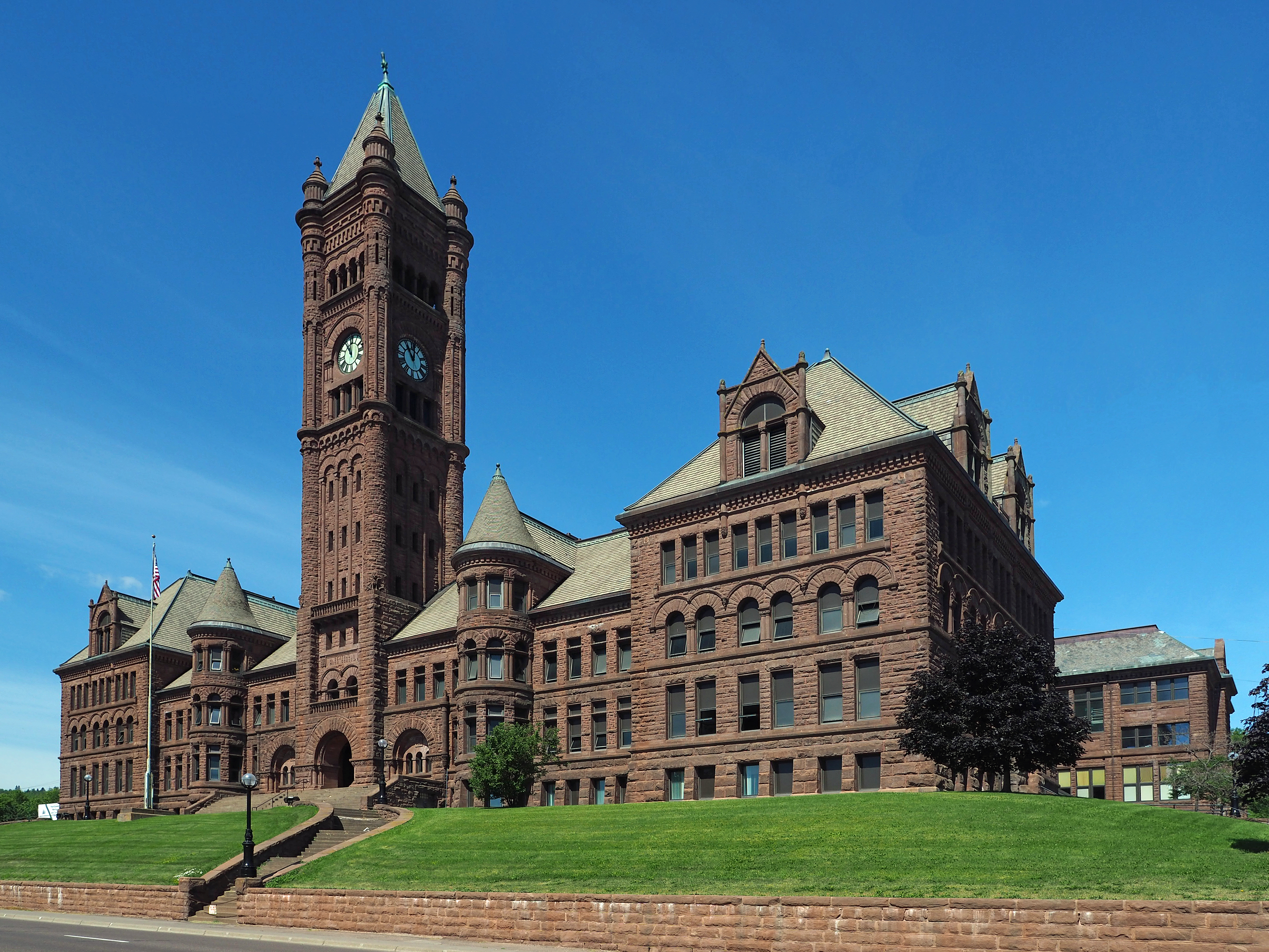
Historic Old Central High School (1892)

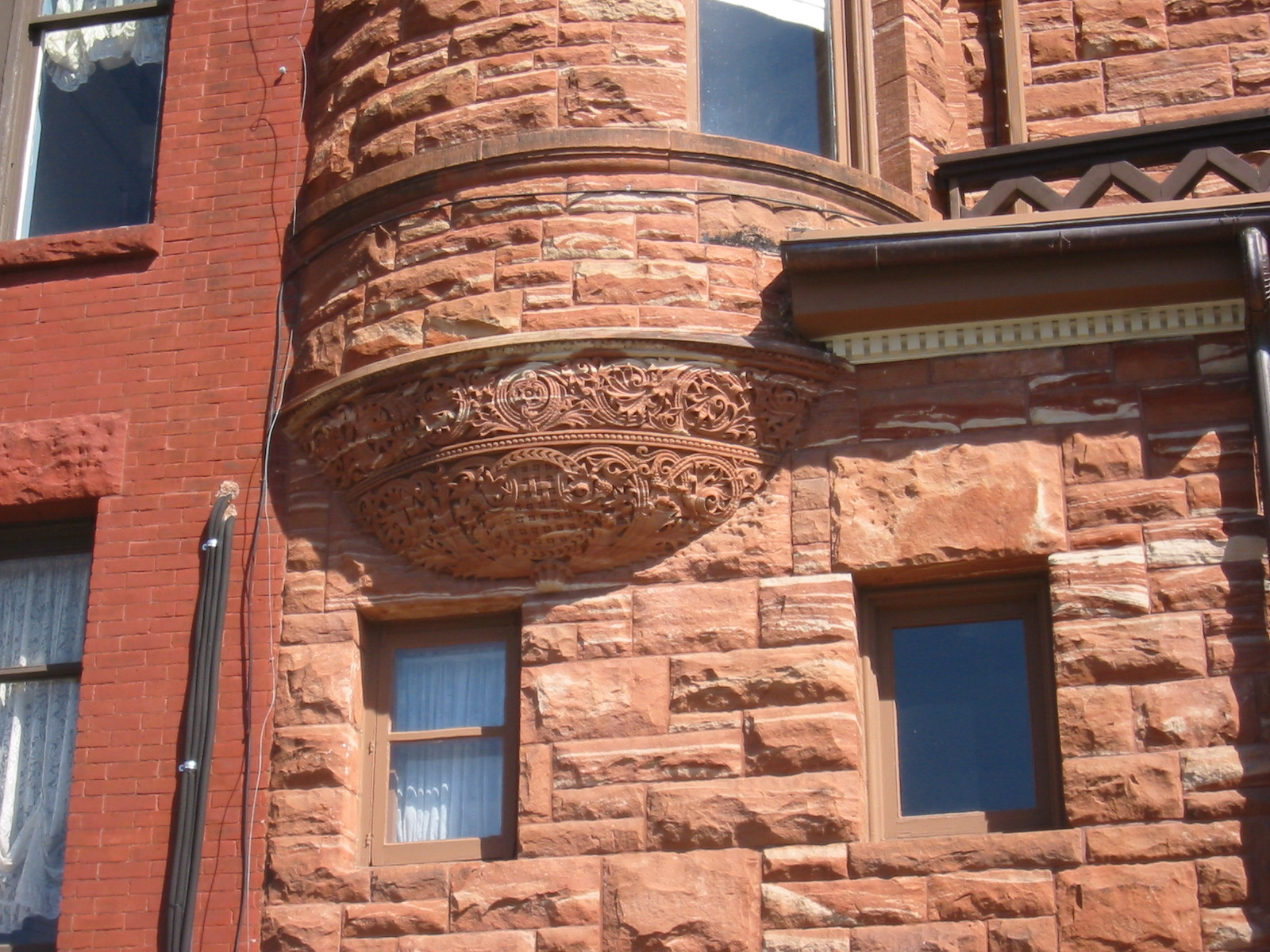
Sandstone carving, Traphagen House (1892)

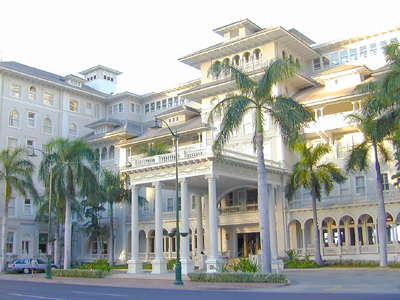
Moana Hotel (1898)

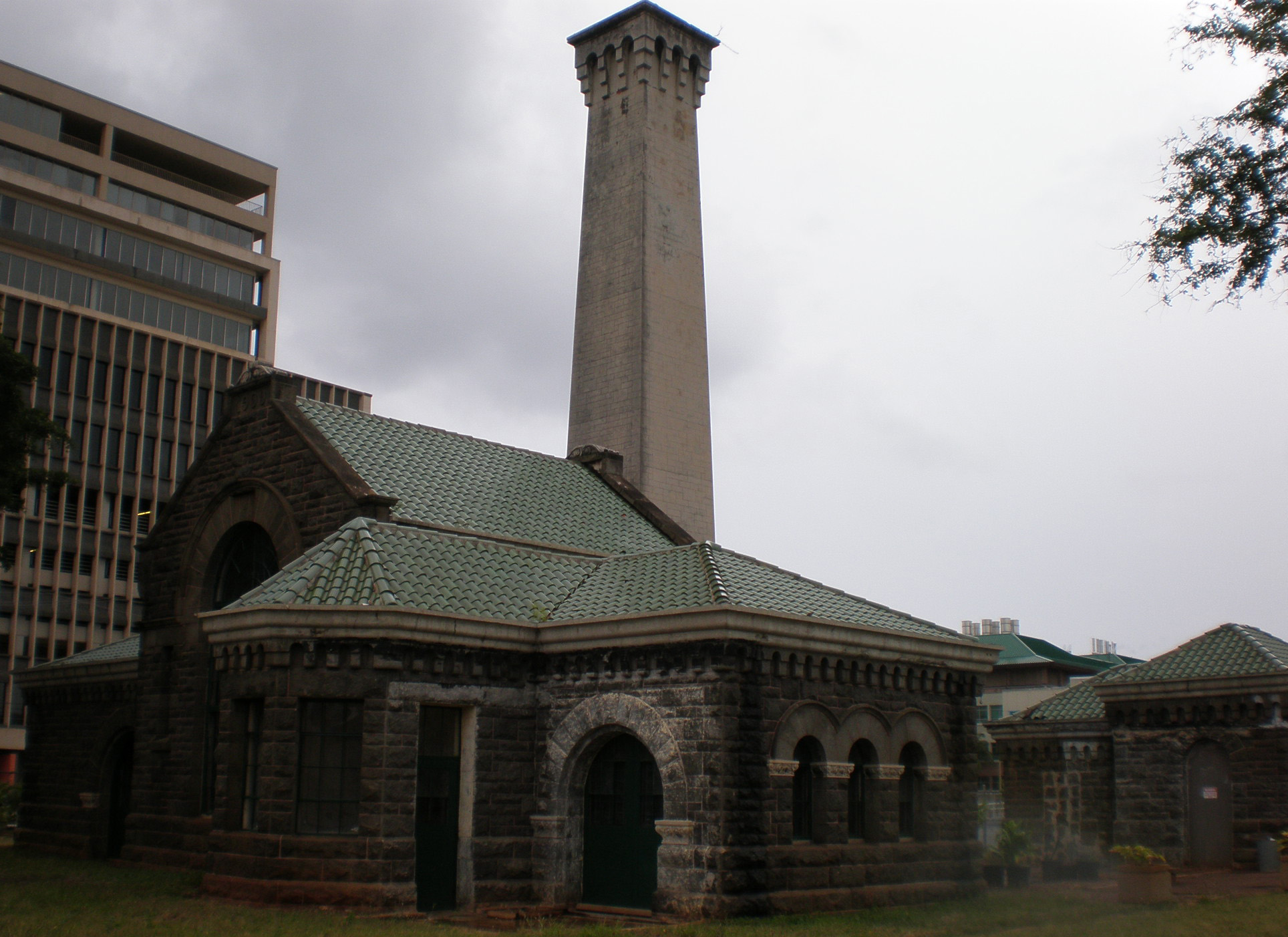
Kakaako Pumping Station (1900)

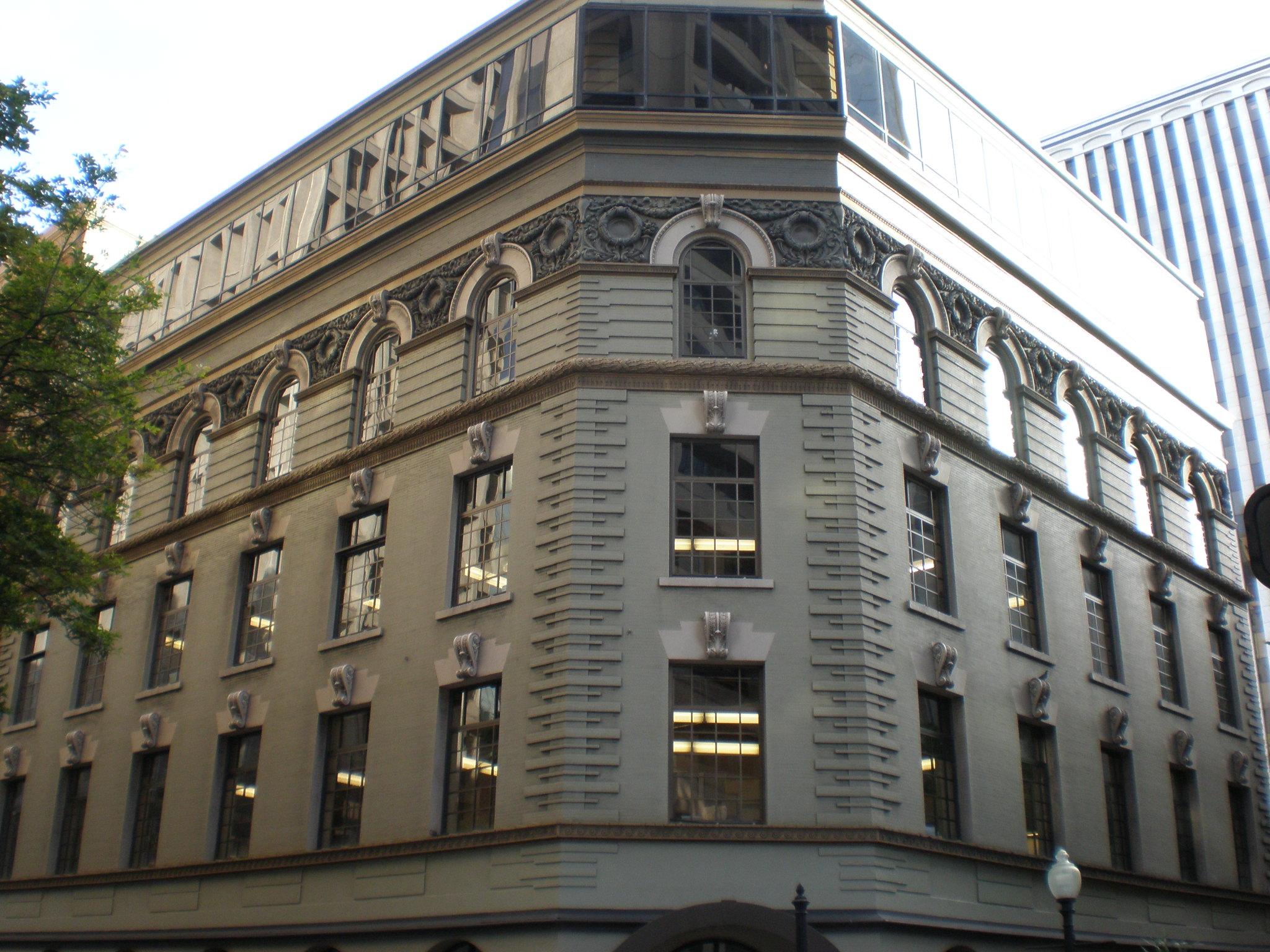
Judd Building (1901)

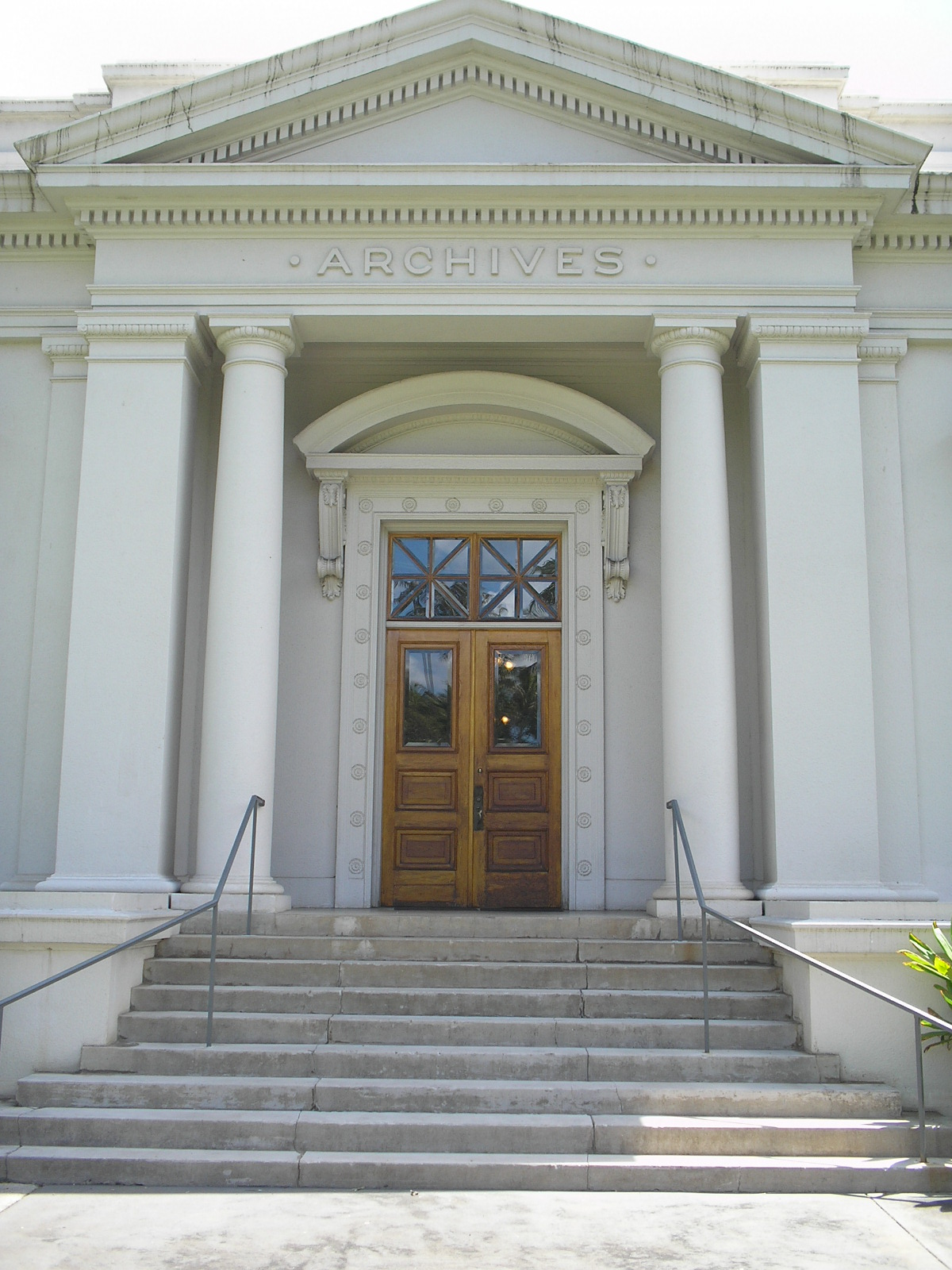
Front entrance, Old Hawaii State Archives building (1906)

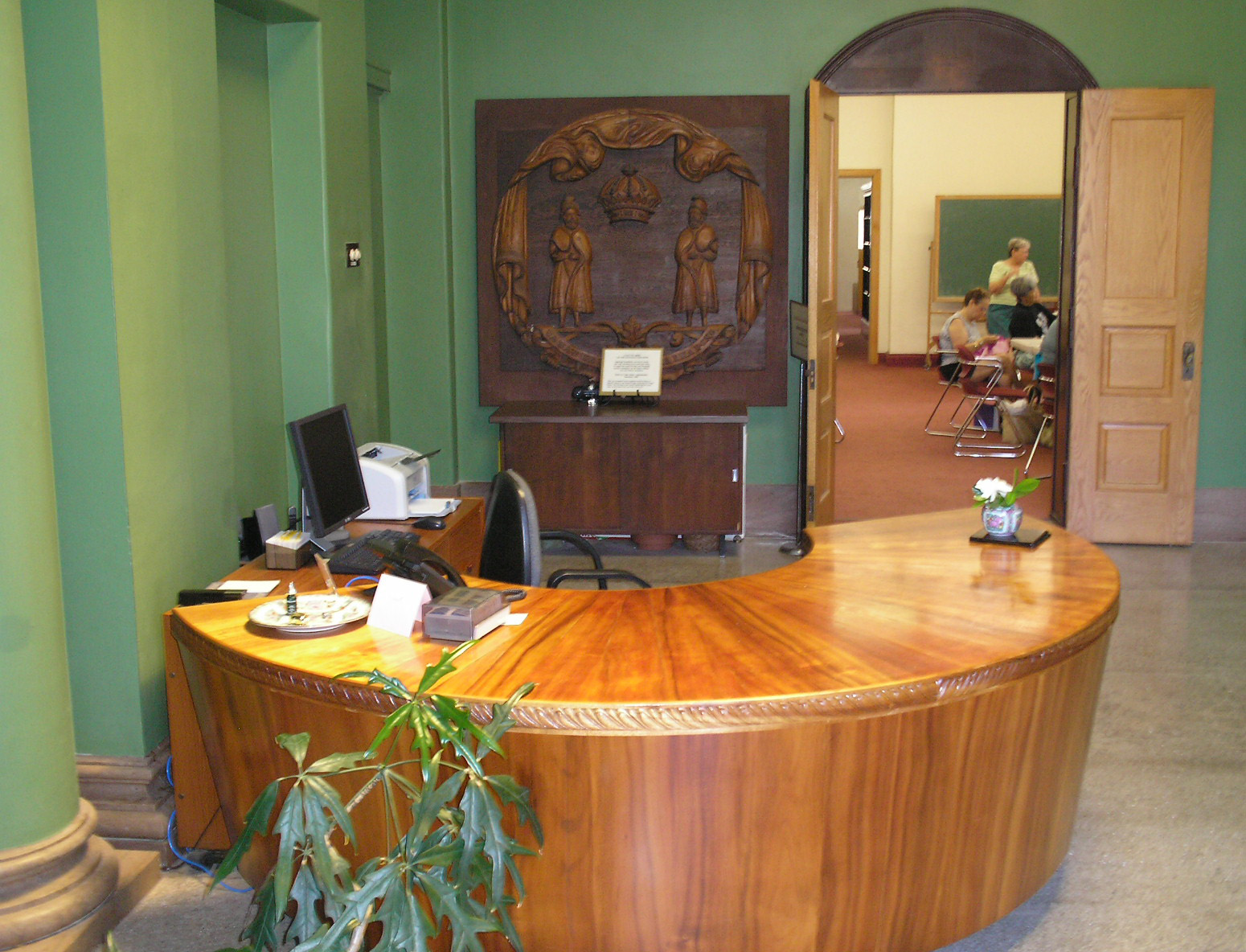
Reception area, Old Hawaii State Archives building (1906)

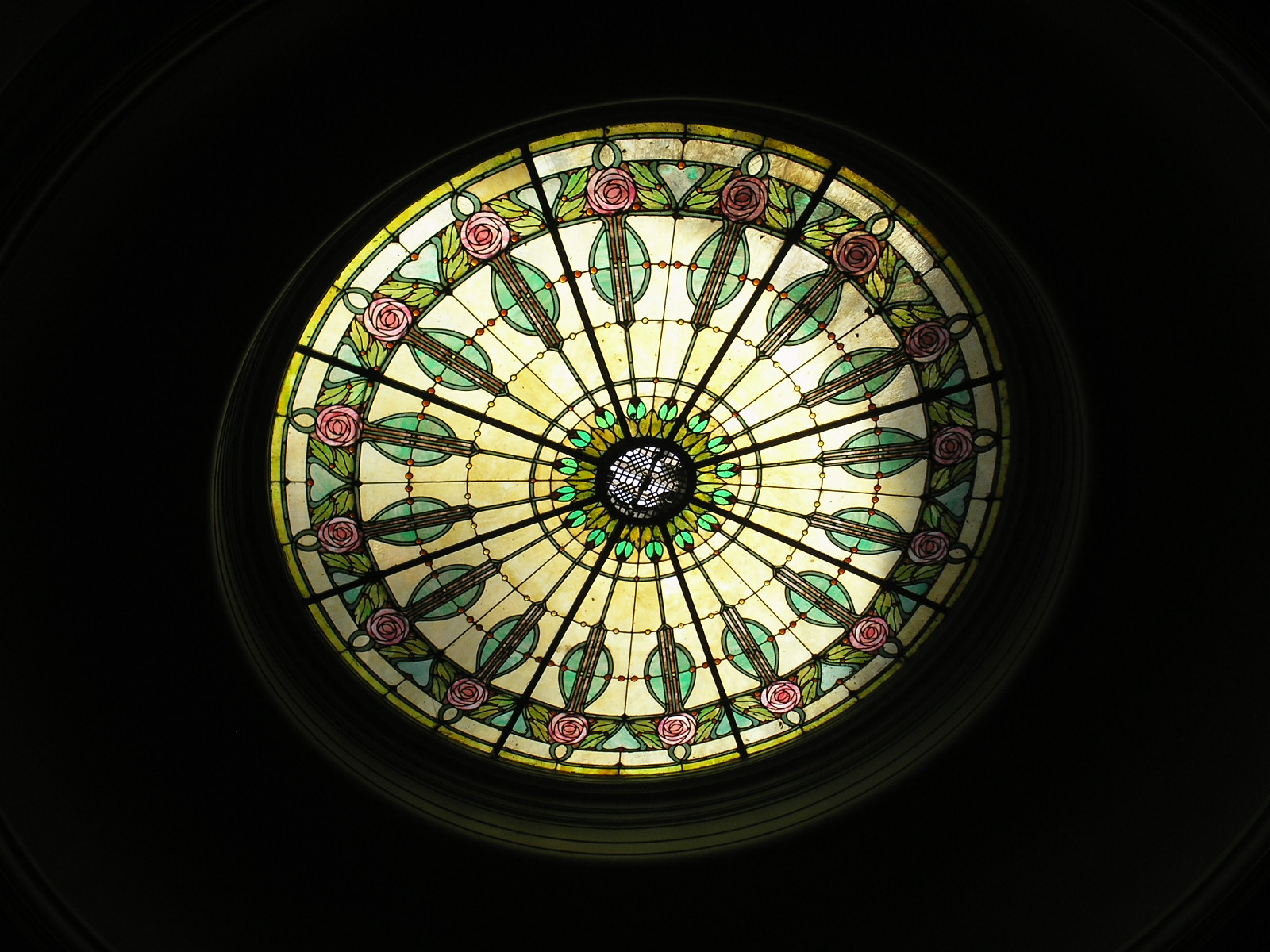
Skylight, Old Hawaii State Archives building (1906)

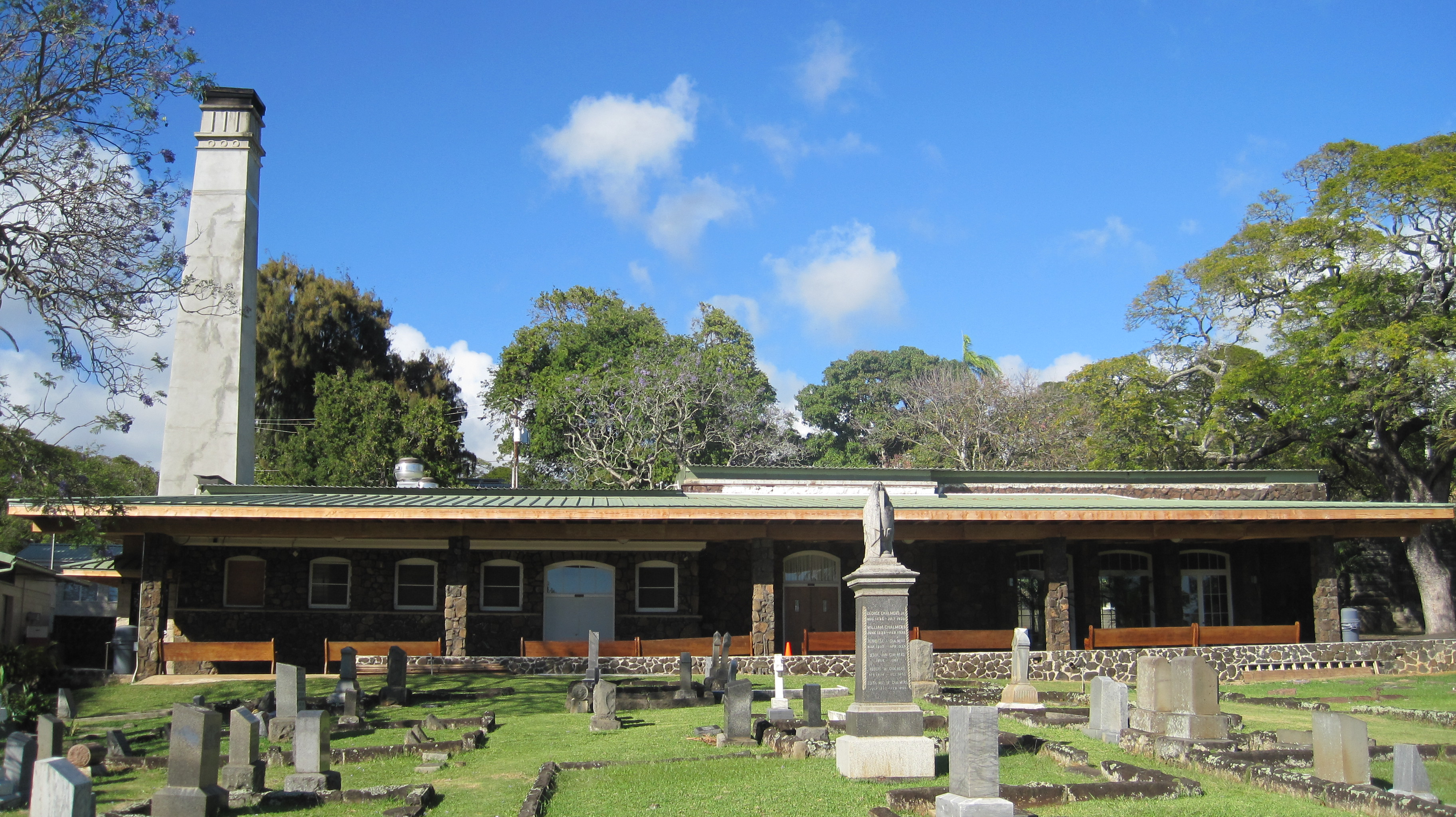
Oahu Cemetery Crematorium (1906)

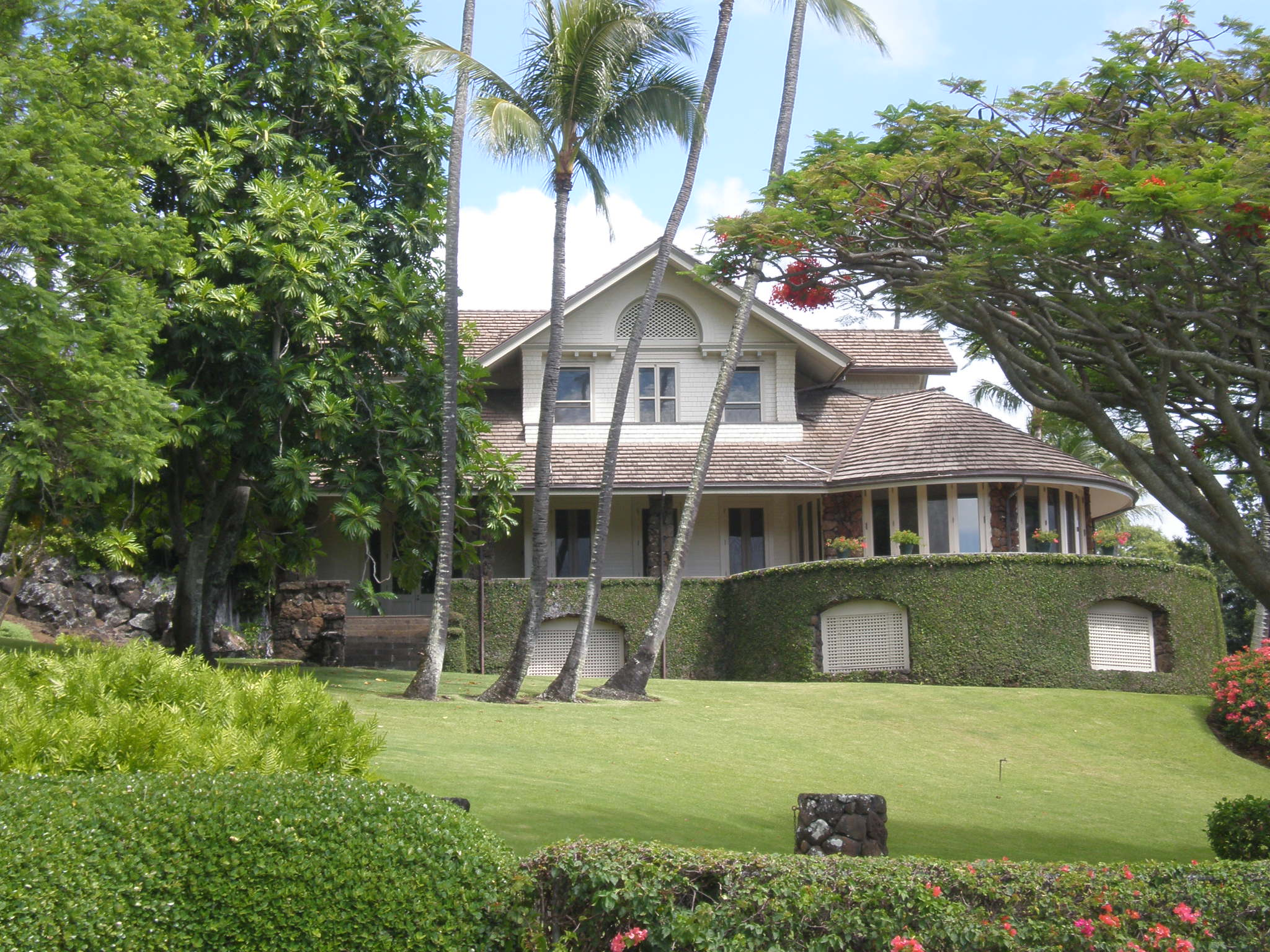
Punahou School President's House (1907)

== See also ==
- Anton Werner Lignell – contemporary Duluth-based architect

== Notes ==
- Wilcox, Gaylord (1972). "Business and Buildings: Downtown Honolulu's Old Fashioned Block," Hawaiian Journal of History 6:3-27.
- Hawaiian Time Machine
