= Oliver G. Traphagen House =

Historic house in Minnesota, United States

- U.S. National Register of Historic Places
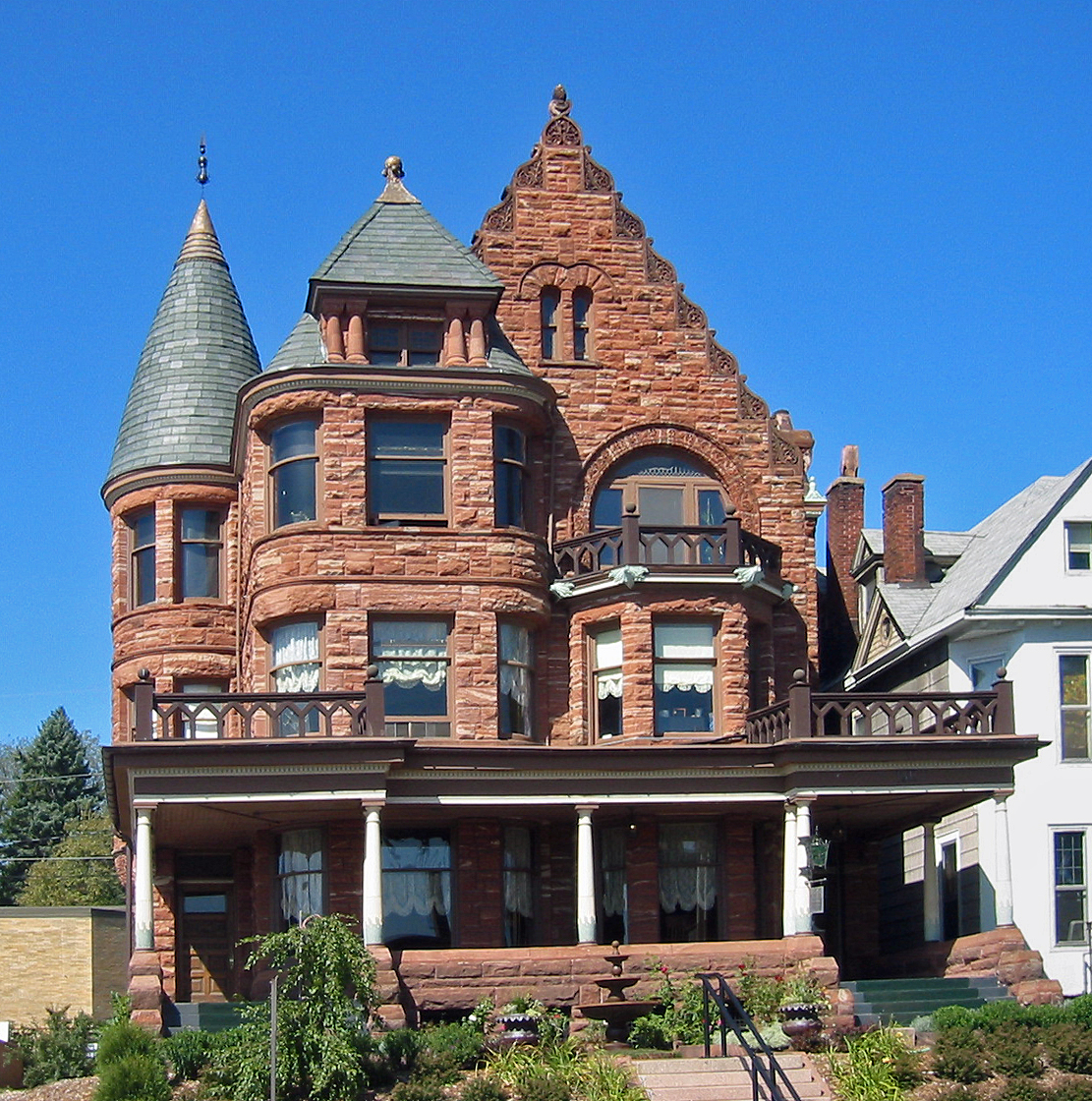
- House from southeast in 2007, before fire

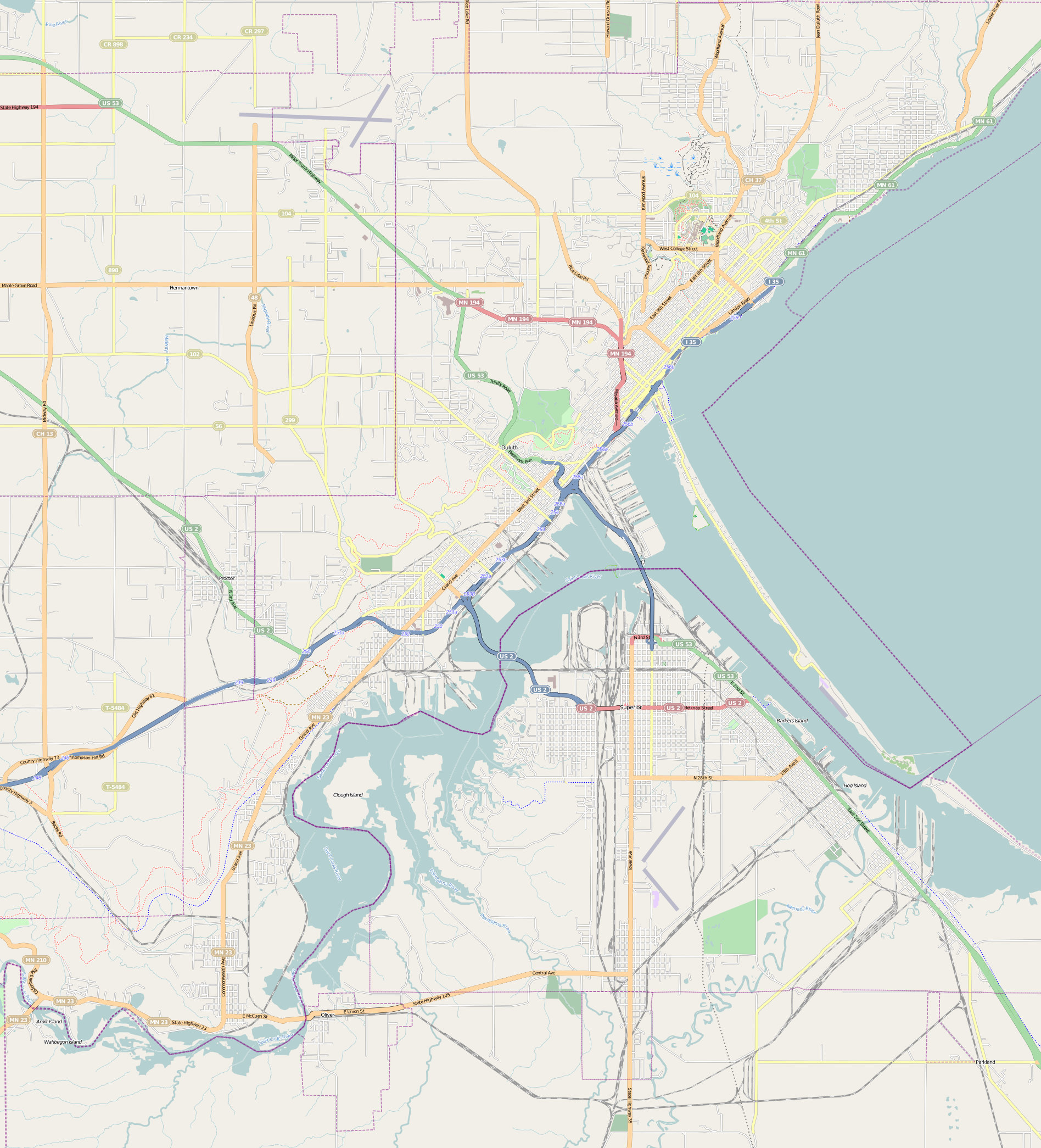
- Location within Duluth Location within Minnesota Location within the United States
- Location: 1509–1511 E. Superior Street, Duluth, Minnesota
- Coordinates: 46°48′6.5″N 92°4′46″W
- Area: Less than one acre
- Built: 1892
- Architect: Oliver G. Traphagen
- Architectural style: Richardsonian Romanesque
- NRHP reference No.: 75002091
- Added to NRHP: April 4, 1975

The Oliver G. Traphagen House, also known as Redstone, is a historic residential building in Duluth, Minnesota, United States. Built in 1892 as a duplex, it was designed and inhabited by architect Oliver G. Traphagen (1854–1932). The building was listed on the National Register of Historic Places in 1975 for its local significance in the theme of architecture. It was nominated for its association with Traphagen, recognized together with his business partner Francis W. Fitzpatrick as Duluth's leading architects of the late 19th century.

In 2014, the house was heavily damaged by arson.

== Description ==
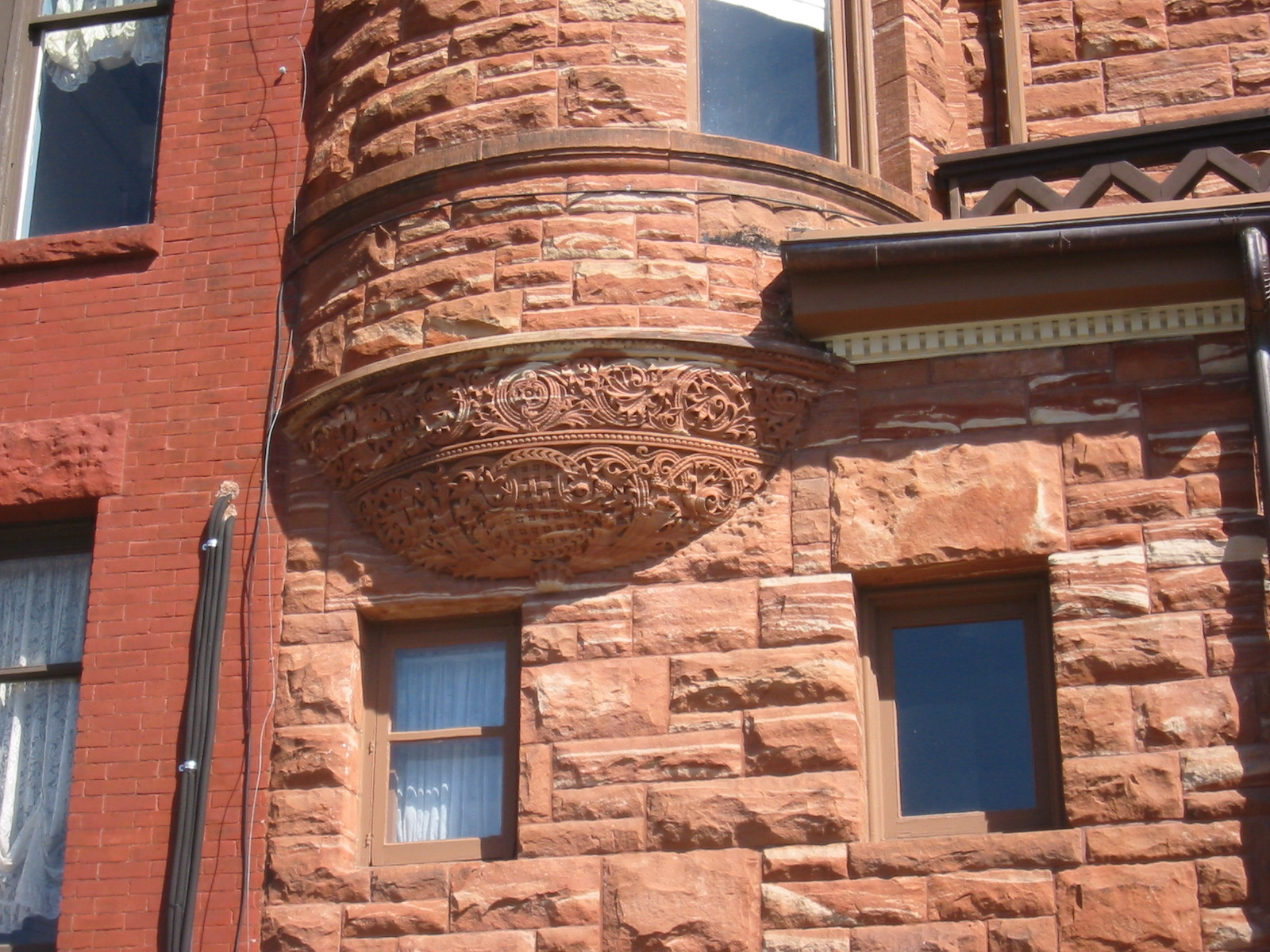
Detail of the sandstone work beneath the turret

The Traphagen House is a three-story Victorian mansion. The main façade is built of local red sandstone and features ornate carving and window dressing, along with towers and unusual dormers. The three other faces of the building are clad in red brick. The unornamented side elevations indicate that other buildings pressed close to the house when it was originally constructed.

Built on a narrow city lot, the house is 44 feet (13 m) wide and 73 feet (22 m) long, with a minimal front yard and no side yards. A wraparound front porch spans the width of the ground floor, with stone balustrades marking the corners over the two entrances. The Traphagen House was originally designed as a duplex with two separate entrances and very similar floor plans on either side, with the exception of the front windows. The west side has curved windows while the east side has straight windows with wood wainscoting underneath. The interior totals more than 9,200 square feet (850 m^{2}). Both units contained a parlor, sitting room, library, dining room, and kitchen on the ground floor and bedrooms on the two upper floors. Every major room had its own fireplace. The house has 10 fireplaces total, all but one of which retain their original tile. The house also has antique light fixtures in most of the rooms. These fixtures operated on either gas or electricity, because at the time interior electric wiring was still new and not yet proven.

== History ==
When he completed this house in 1892, Oliver G. Traphagen was already considered Duluth's preeminent architect. He'd moved to the city in the early 1880s with his brothers George and Walter, after a childhood in New York and a few years in Saint Paul, Minnesota, where he'd worked as a carpenter. Duluth was booming and Traphagen rose swiftly from carpenter to contractor to architect. By 1890 his credits included Duluth City Hall, 20 commercial buildings, and 50 residences. Partnering with Francis W. Fitzpatrick brought additional renown, as their firm produced designs for several prominent buildings in Duluth.

In the midst of his success, Traphagen designed this house for himself and his family. In 1896 he and Fitzpatrick dissolved their business partnership and Traphagen worked independently for almost a year. However one of his children fell ill and the Traphagens decided to move to the more healthful climate of Honolulu, Hawaii.

Oliver Traphagen sold the house to mining magnate Chester Congdon, who lived there with his family from 1897 until their mansion Glensheen was completed in 1908. The Congdons, who still owned the house, subdivided it into nine small apartments in 1919. It continued to serve as an apartment building for the next 67 years, under a succession of owners and increasing decrepitude. In 1986 local businessman Howard Klatzky fell in love with the building and purchased it to be the headquarters for his advertising firm. "I bought it from a slumlord who'd owned it four different times," Klatzky noted. He conducted extensive renovations and furnished the building with period antiques. With the building rezoned for commercial use, H.T. Klatzky and Associates had fully moved in by spring 1987. Klatzky retired in 2012 and sold the company to two longtime business partners, who renamed it HTK Marketing Communications. By then another firm, Ledingham Promotional Advertising, also had offices in the Traphagen House. The house was converted into apartment units in 2019.

== Arson ==
Shortly after midnight on August 18, 2014, a fire broke out on the first floor of the west unit and spread up a staircase into the second floor. Duluth firefighters extinguished the blaze, but what owner Howard Klatzky described as "the fanciest part of the whole building" was profoundly damaged, and the exterior was blackened on that side.

In the morning the owner of a business across the street found a Molotov cocktail that had been thrown through his basement window but failed to ignite. Officials stated that the incidents were likely related, and opened an arson investigation.

The fire in the Traphagen House struck just as the tenant businesses were about to relocate to more modern facilities in the DeWitt–Seitz Building in Duluth's Canal Park. The planned move meant that Klatzky had retained ownership of the building, and earlier that summer had put it on the market for $750,000. He had also arranged to sell his antique furnishings at auction. About three-quarters of the antiques in the house were salvaged, though many of their values were reduced by soot and smoke damage.

In November 2014 the vacant and fire-damaged house was burglarized, with thieves extracting piping, plumbing, and wiring for their metal.

The Traphagen House remained structurally sound, and Klatzky aspired to save the building. In April 2015 he sold it to private developers for $1,000. A spokesman stated that the new ownership group "believes it is an intrinsically valuable property and they wanted it even not knowing what the restoration costs are going to be." He cautioned however that demolition was a possibility if the building proved economically infeasible to restore.

== See also ==
- National Register of Historic Places listings in St. Louis County, Minnesota
