= Chester Terrace (Duluth, Minnesota) =

Historic rowhouse in Duluth, Minnesota

- U.S. National Register of Historic Places
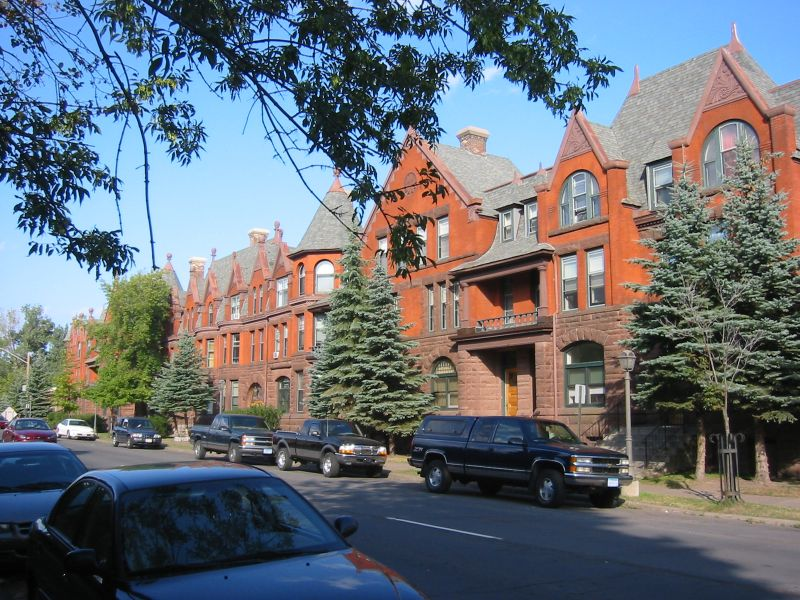
- Chester Terrace viewed from the west

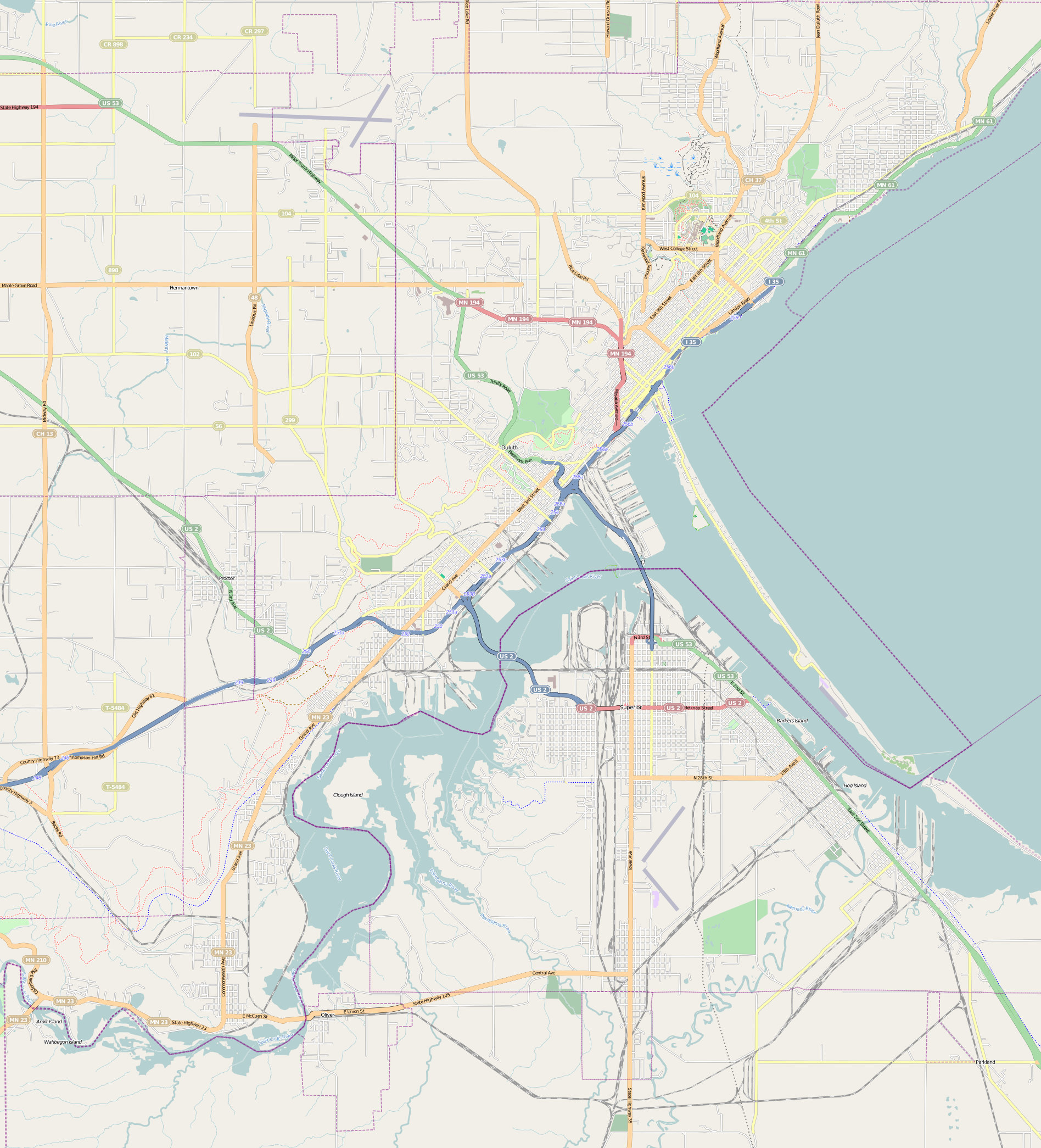
- Location within Duluth Location within Minnesota Location within the United States
- Location: 1210–1232 E. 1st Street, Duluth, Minnesota
- Coordinates: 46°47′58″N 92°5′0″W
- Area: Less than one acre
- Built: 1890
- Architect: Oliver G. Traphagen and Francis W. Fitzpatrick
- Architectural style: Romanesque Revival
- NRHP reference No.: 80004341
- Added to NRHP: November 19, 1980

Chester Terrace is a historic rowhouse in Duluth, Minnesota, United States. Built in 1890, it was designed in Romanesque Revival style by Oliver G. Traphagen and Francis W. Fitzpatrick. It was listed on the National Register of Historic Places in 1980 for its local significance in the theme of architecture. It was nominated as one of Duluth's outstanding examples of a Romanesque Revival rowhouse.

Chester Terrace was built using brick and brownstone. The design features towers, turrets, gables, and finials. The building is named after Chester Creek, which flows into Lake Superior near the building.

== See also ==
- National Register of Historic Places listings in St. Louis County, Minnesota
