= Wirth Building =

- U.S. National Register of Historic Places
- U.S. Historic district – Contributing property
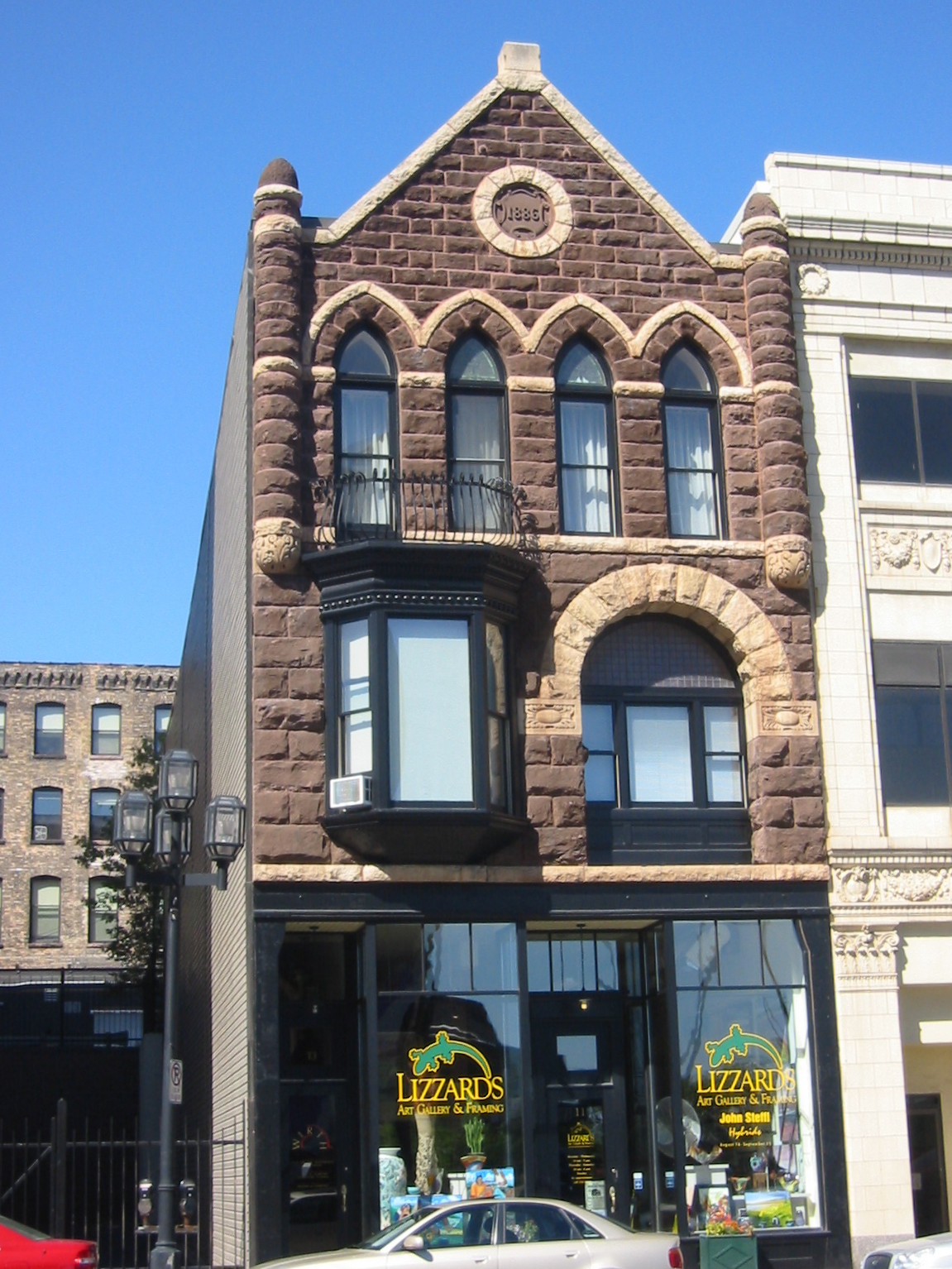
- The Wirth Building viewed from the southeast

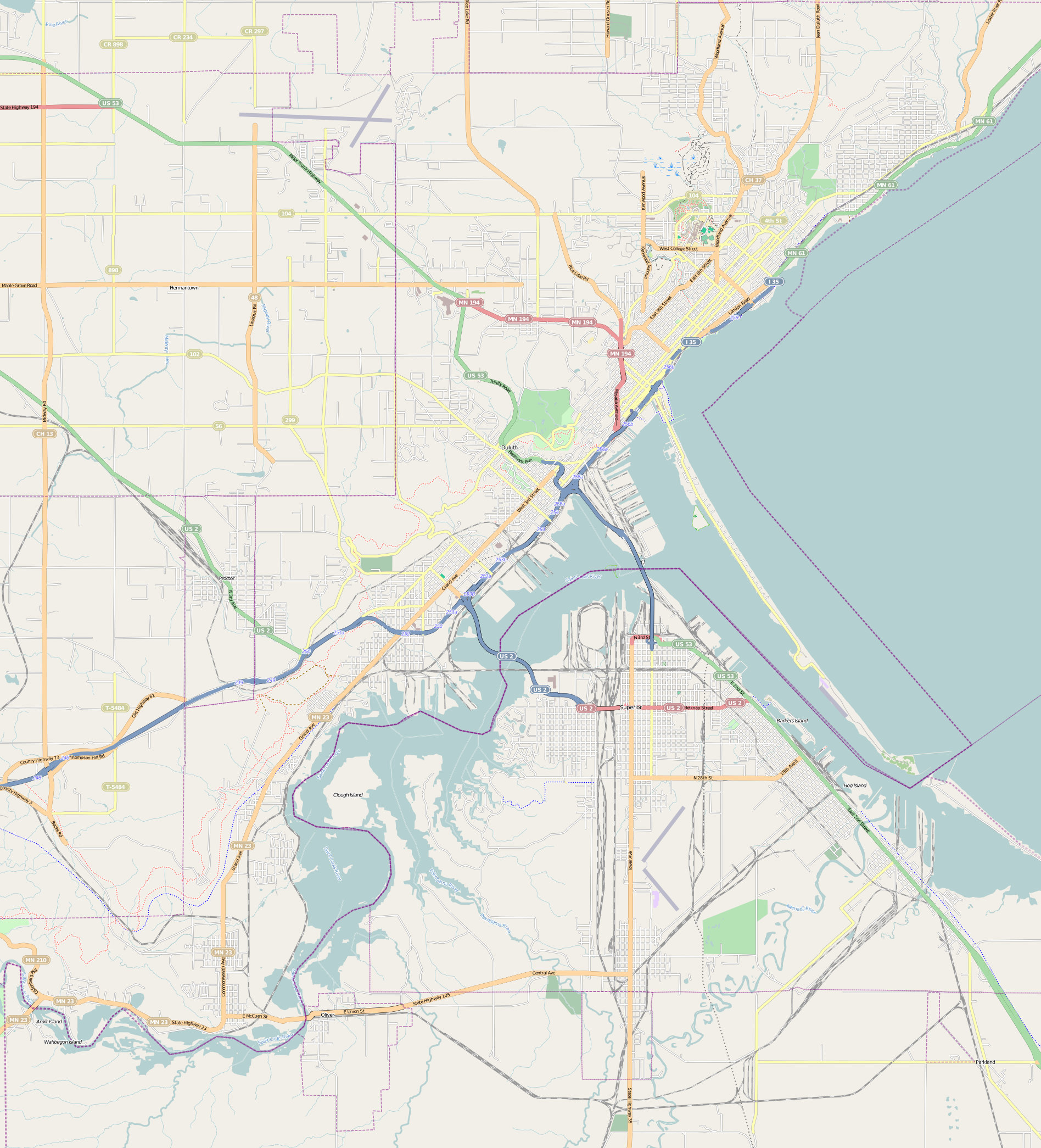
- Location within Duluth Location within Minnesota Location within the United States
- Location: 13 W. Superior Street, Duluth, Minnesota
- Coordinates: 46°47′12″N 92°5′56″W
- Area: Less than one acre
- Built: 1886
- Architect: Oliver G. Traphagen, George Wirth
- Architectural style: Richardsonian Romanesque
- Part of: Duluth Commercial Historic District (ID98001220)
- NRHP reference No.: 91000896

Significant dates
- Added to NRHP: July 25, 1991
- Designated CP: May 31, 2006

The Wirth Building is a commercial building in downtown Duluth, Minnesota, United States. When it was constructed in 1886 it was the city's first example of Richardsonian Romanesque style, and it stands as an early work of architect Oliver G. Traphagen. The Wirth Building was listed on the National Register of Historic Places in 1991 for its local significance in the theme of architecture. It was nominated for being a leading local example of its architectural style and a key turning point in the career of an important Duluth-based architect.

The building was commissioned by Max Wirth to house his pharmacy business. Wirth's brother George happened to be one of Minnesota's best-known architects at the time, and had just forged a partnership with his star employee Traphagen. Evidence is lacking to say which of the two partners might have been more responsible for the building, which was a stylistic departure for both. Shortly after the building was completed, Wirth moved back to his native Bavaria while Traphagen remained in Duluth and became its premier architect.

== See also ==
- National Register of Historic Places listings in St. Louis County, Minnesota
