= Munger Terrace =

- U.S. National Register of Historic Places
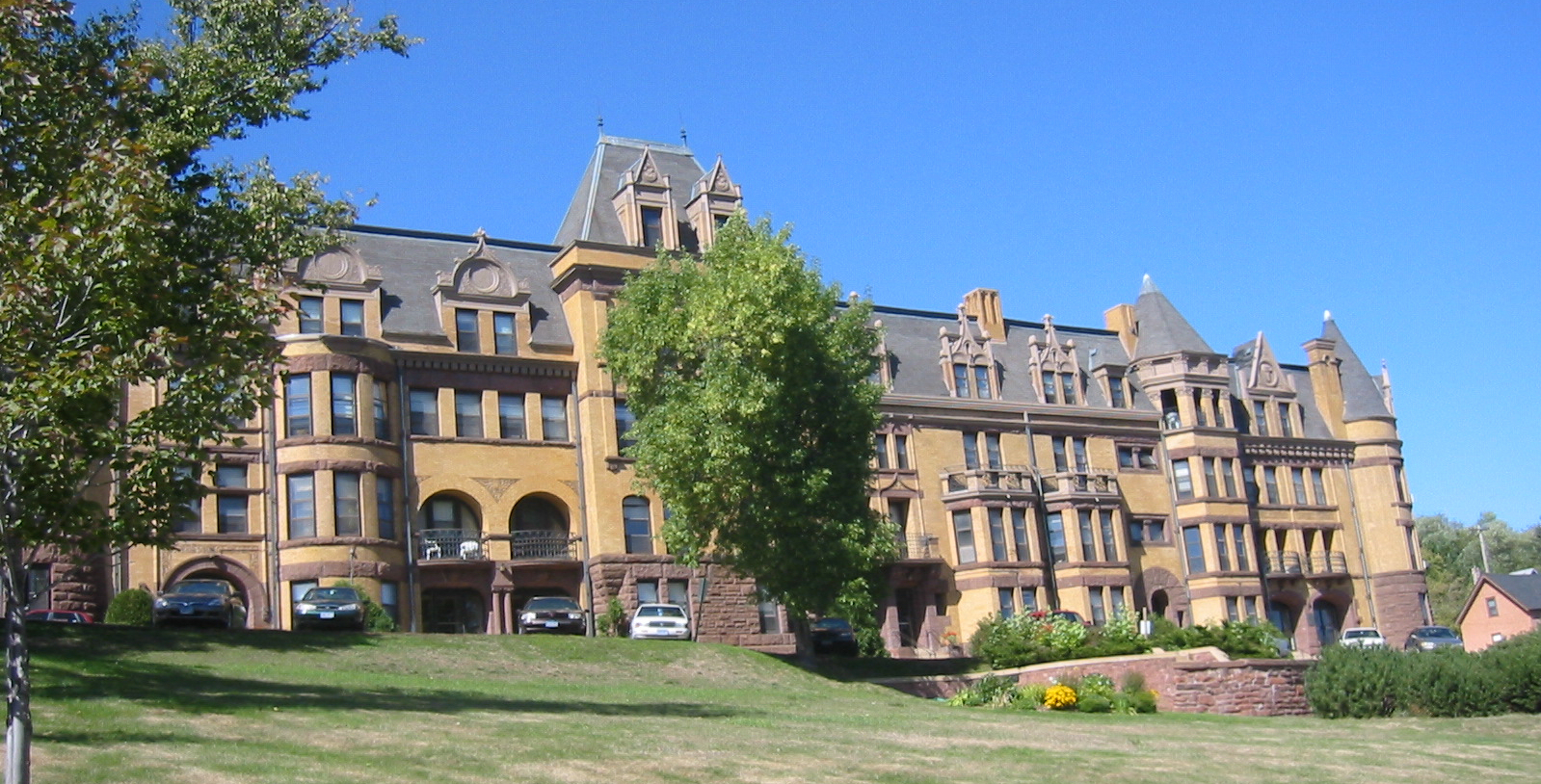
- Munger Terrace viewed from the south

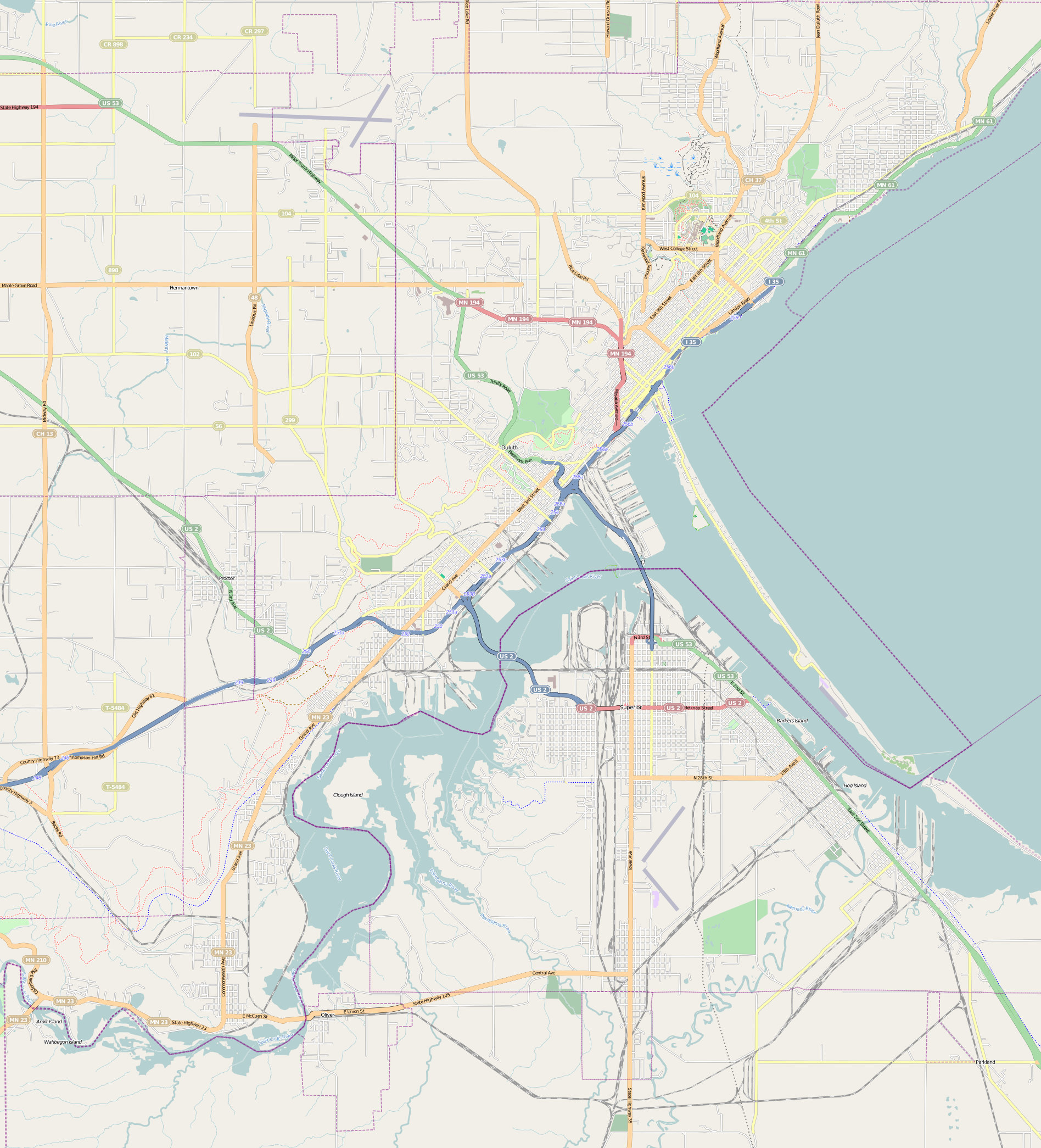
- Location within Duluth Location within Minnesota Location within the United States
- Location: 405 Mesaba Avenue, Duluth, Minnesota
- Coordinates: 46°47′8.5″N 92°6′33″W
- Area: 1 acre (0.40 ha)
- Built: 1891–92
- Architect: Oliver G. Traphagen and Francis W. Fitzpatrick
- Architectural style: Châteauesque, Richardsonian Romanesque
- NRHP reference No.: 76002176
- Added to NRHP: December 12, 1976

Munger Terrace is an architecturally significant rowhouse in the Central Hillside neighborhood of Duluth, Minnesota, United States. It was designed by Oliver G. Traphagen and Francis W. Fitzpatrick and built from 1891 to 1892, originally containing eight luxury townhomes. Munger Terrace was listed on the National Register of Historic Places in 1976 for its local significance in the theme of architecture. It was nominated for being Duluth's finest example of Châteauesque architecture applied to an apartment building.

== History ==
The building, in brick with brownstone trim, was constructed for Roger S. Munger, an important early Duluth entrepreneur, on a site next to his mansion. The residential units were rentals, Munger's only such project. The architects were Oliver G. Traphagen and Francis W. Fitzpatrick. The style of the building is sometimes described as Richardsonian Romanesque, sometimes as Châteauesque. The National Register of Historic Places lists it as Renaissance Revival. The townhouses were all different and had sixteen rooms, separate front and back stairs, central steam heat, running water on all floors, gas for cooking, and electric lighting. The site in the Central Hillside neighborhood below North 5th Street between North 4th and North 5th Avenues West was three blocks above the tower of the downtown post office, and gardens with fountains and a gazebo were laid out on the slope in front of the building.

The project's original name was Piedmont Terrace, but Piedmont Avenue below was renamed Mesabi Avenue and is now Mesaba Avenue; a different Duluth street is now called Piedmont Avenue. The current address of the building is 405 Mesaba Avenue.

One of the original tenants was the Benedictine Sisters, who rented the three westernmost units (6 through 8) and used two rooms on the second floor of unit 8 as a chapel. They started a school there that was a forerunner of the College of St. Scholastica. The nuns left after outgrowing the space.

Munger's mansion was demolished in 1955. Its carriage house, on 5th Street, has been retained as a caretaker's house but its trim has been removed. In 1915 the townhouses were divided into apartments. In the 1970s Mesaba Avenue was widened and much of the land in front of the building lost; what is left is a lawn, and that part of 4th Avenue is now a step street. Munger Terrace was placed on the National Register of Historic Places on December 12, 1976. From 1978 to 1979 the building was extensively rehabilitated by the non-profit Town View Improvement Corporation, with new windows, skylights, roof, heating, utilities, and kitchen equipment and the addition of sprinklers. It remains a rental building.

== See also ==
- National Register of Historic Places listings in St. Louis County, Minnesota
