= Kakaako Pumping Station =

- Kakaʻako Pumping Station
- U.S. National Register of Historic Places
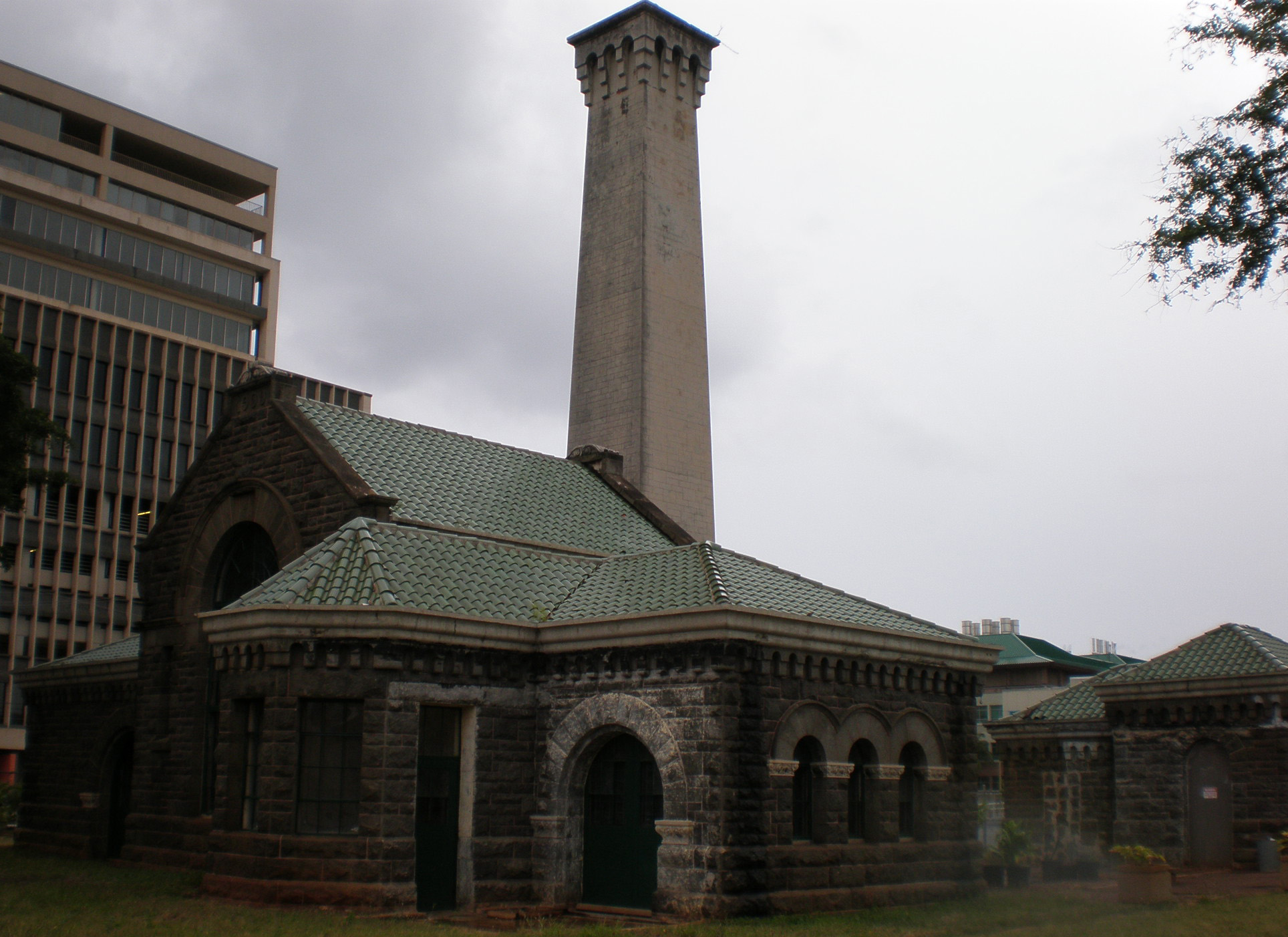

- Location within Hawaii
- Location: 653 Ala Moana Blvd., Honolulu, Hawaii
- Coordinates: 21°18′10″N 157°51′56″W
- Area: 1.1 acres (0.45 ha)
- Built: 1900
- Architect: Oliver G. Traphagen
- Architectural style: Richardsonian Romanesque
- NRHP reference No.: 78001022
- Added to NRHP: October 4, 1978

The Kakaʻako Pumping Station in Honolulu, Hawaii was designed by architect Oliver G. Traphagen in the Richardsonian Romanesque style. He also designed many such bold stone public works buildings in Duluth, Minnesota.

Built in 1900, the pumping station features large arched windows, exterior walls of local lava rock, roofs of green tile, and a smokestack 76 feet tall. It was the first sewerage pumping station in Honolulu, Hawaii, designed to address the serious sanitation problems of the rapidly growing city. It is located on an acre of land between the Kewalo Basin and Downtown Honolulu, at Ala Moana Boulevard and Keawe Street.

The Ala Moana Pumping Station took over its functions in 1940, and it has remained vacant for many years. Now under the jurisdiction of the Hawaii Community Development Authority, it is slowly being restored by the nonprofit Hawaii Architectural Foundation.

Oliver G. Traphagen also designed the "bright and airy" Moana Hotel on Waikiki Beach.

A McMenamins brewery and restaurant in Tigard, Oregon was built based on the design of Kakaʻako Pumping Station.

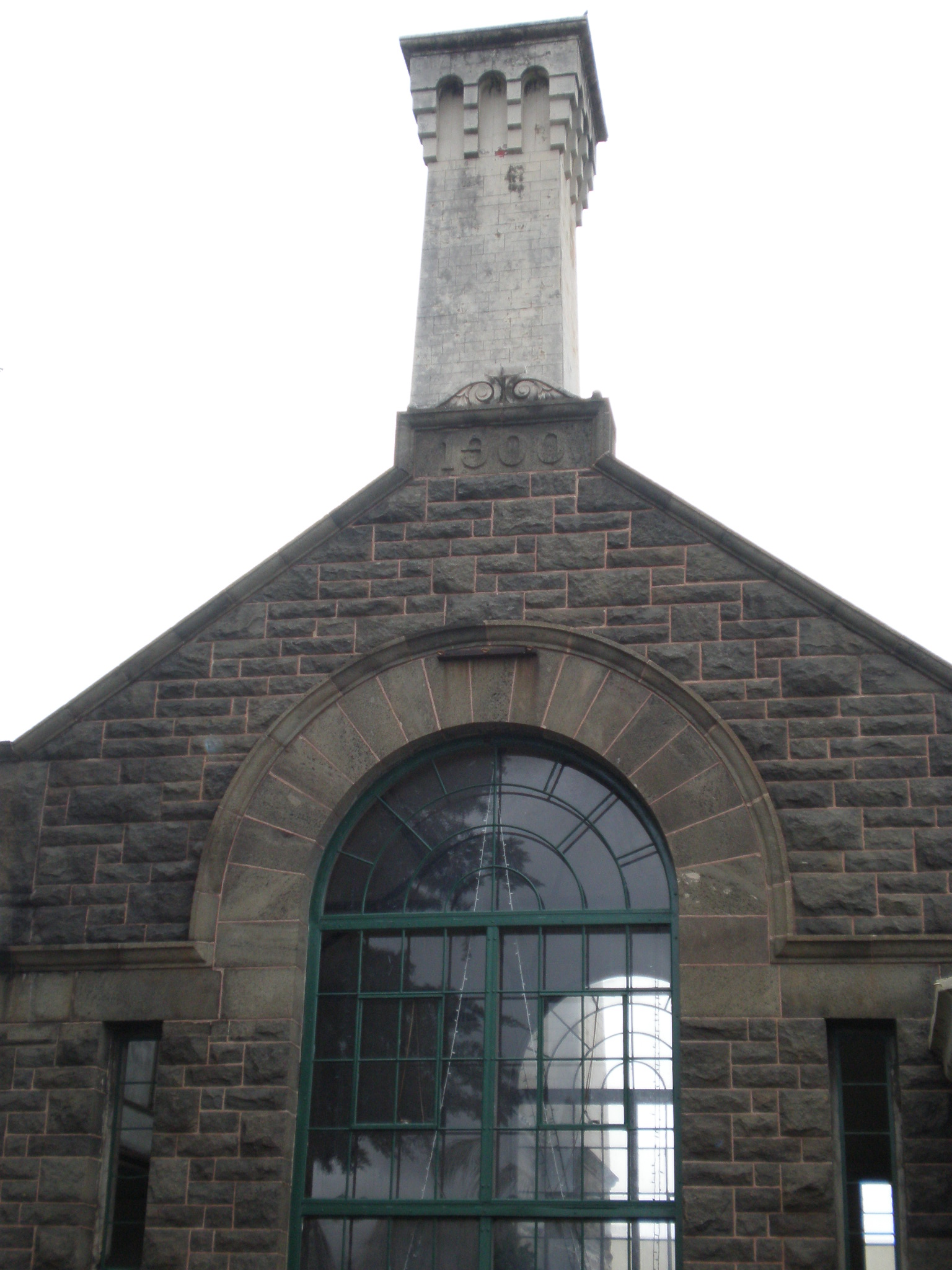

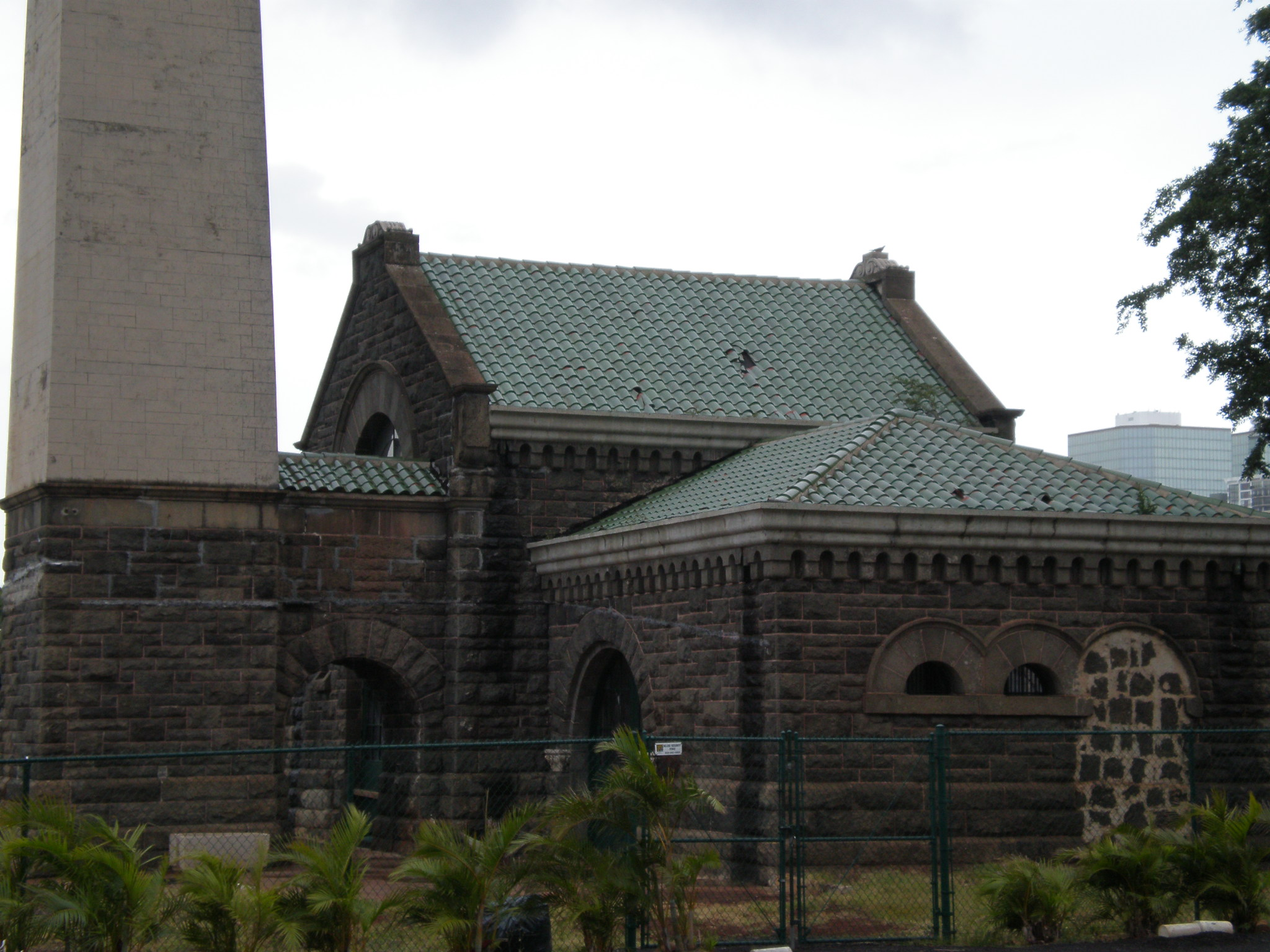
