= Francis W. Fitzpatrick =

American architect

Francis Willford Fitzpatrick
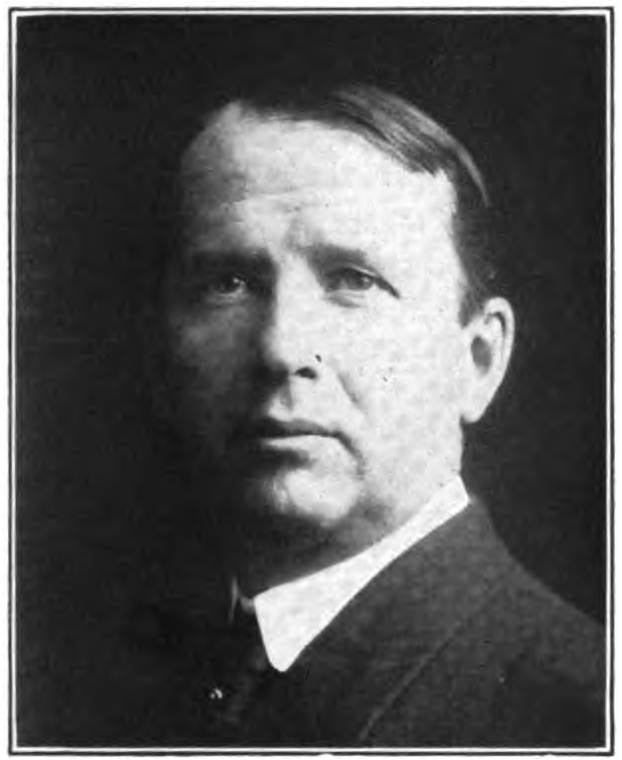
- An early 20th Century portrait
- Born: April 9, 1863; Montreal, Canada East
- Died: July 10, 1931 (aged 68); Evanston, Illinois, USA
- Occupation: Architect

Francis Willford Fitzpatrick (April 9, 1863 – July 10, 1931) was an architect in Duluth, Minnesota, Washington, DC, Omaha, Nebraska, and Evanston, Illinois. He often abbreviated his name as F. W. Fitzpatrick in publications and correspondence. Fitzpatrick was an early advocate of fireproof buildings, and he was a frequent columnist in architectural trade publications on a variety of topics.

== Early life ==
Fitzpatrick was born in Montreal, Canada East, on April 9, 1863. His parents were John and Mary Fitzpatrick. He immigrated to the United States in 1883 and began working as a drafter in the office of Minneapolis architect Leroy Buffington, remaining until 1887. Then in 1888, Fitzpatrick worked at the offices of the brothers Fremont D. Orff and George W. Orff. He formed the Minnesota Decorating Company and successfully contracted for the interior painting and decorating of the 107-room Dacotah Hotel in Grand Forks, North Dakota in 1889.

He joined the American Institute of Architects in 1889.

== Traphagen and Fitzpatrick ==
After completing his work at the Dacotah Hotel, Fitzpatrick moved to Duluth, Minnesota, and formed a partnership, Traphagen and Fitzpatrick, with Oliver G. Traphagen that lasted from 1890 to 1896. This was his most productive time as an architect. Noted Duluth architect Frederick German worked for the two as a draftsman at this time.

=== List of Traphagen and Fitzpatrick designs ===
- Phoenix Block, 1890
- Fitger Brewery Boiler House, 1890
- A W. Wieland Store, 1890
- Hoppmann Building, 1890
- Lester Park Hotel, 1890
- Philadelphia Terrace (townhouses), 1890
- Chester Terrace (townhouses), 1890
- Clinton & Kate Markell House, 1890
- Alonzo & Julia Whiteman House, 1890
- Costello Block (second), 1891
- Lyceum Theater, 1891
- First Presbyterian Church, 1891
- Incline Pavilion, 1891
- Duluth Shoe Co./Duluth Dry Goods Co., 1891
- Selleck Block, 1891
- Charlotte Wells Store, 1891
- Hardy Hall, 1891
- James Norton Rental Houses (2), 1891
- Alexander Miles Rental Houses (6), 1891
- Henry & Lizzie Blume House, 1891
- Torrey Building, 1892
- Boyle Brothers Saloon & Restaurant, 1892
- Duluth Street Railway Co. Barn, 1892
- Duluth Driving Park, 1892
- Myron & Mary Bunnell House, 1892
- William & Josephine Magie House, 1892
- Oliver & Amelia Traphagen House, 1892
- Munger Terrace (townhouses), 1892
- Townsend & Mayme Hoopes House, 1892
- William & Amelia Sherwood House, 1892
- Charles & Maude Towne House, 1892
- Herald Building, 1893
- Mesaba Block, 1893
- Stone-Ordean Warehouse, 1893
- St. Louis Hotel (second), 1893
- Sagar Drug, 1893
- Hamilton & Martha Peyton House, 1893
- Charles & Louise Schiller House, 1893
- George & Jessica Spencer House, 1893
- Crane Ordway Building, 1894
- Elmer & Lizzie Matter House, 1894
- Board of Trade Building (second), 1895
- Tuohy Mercantile, 1895
- P.R. L. Hardenbergh & Co. Building, 1895
- Fitger's Brewery Settling Room, 1896

The partnership ended in 1896 when Traphagan relocated to Hawaii and Fitzpatrick moved to Washington, D.C.

== Chicago Federal Building ==
In 1896 Fitzpatrick accepted a position as assistant to the Supervising Architect at the United States Treasury. Prior to the Tarsney Act of 1893, federal buildings were designed by architects at the treasury. Fitzpatrick entered government service at a time when federal architects were becoming advisors and supervisors on federal building contracts with design work more in the hands of private architects. At the treasury, Fitzpatrick worked for Jeremiah O'Rourke and then for William Aiken. Fitzpatrick was assigned to the Chicago Federal Building project as an assistant to architect Henry Ives Cobb, and he moved to Chicago to become one of many supervisors of construction. Soon Fitzpatrick was the only supervisor of construction, and his relationship with Cobb deteriorated for reasons of procurement and process related to construction. Fitzpatrick resigned from the project in 1903 and returned to private practice two years before the building was completed.

== Private practice ==
Fitzpatrick became a consulting architect in 1903, and he specialized in fire prevention designs. He also worked with other architects to solve design problems. His favorite area of expertise may have been Architectural rendering, and he enjoyed submitting drawings for competition awards.

By 1917, Fitzpatrick joined the Bankers Realty Investment Company in Omaha, Nebraska as head of the architectural department. The company designed and built residential and commercial structures capitalized by investors. While at Bankers, he designed the Hotel Yancey in Grand Island, Nebraska, the Blackstone Hotel in Omaha, and a hotel in Sioux City, Iowa. The job did not last long, and in 1919 Fitzpatrick moved to Evanston, Illinois and continued as a consulting architect.

== Invention of the skyscraper ==
An editorial in the June 22, 1907, issue of The American Architect and Building News reported that three architects had claimed credit for inventing the skyscraper:

- Leroy Buffington for the 1884 Minneapolis Tribune Building
- William Le Baron Jenney for the 1884 Home Insurance Building and
- Bradford Lee Gilbert for the 1889 Tower Building

The editorial stated that in the opinion of the American Institute of Architects (AIA), Jenny had the better claim, although his design was similar to the framing of an 1856 shot tower in the great swamp of New York City.

The July 13, 1907, issue of The American Architect and Building News contained a letter from F. W. Fitzpatrick refuting the conclusions of the AIA titled, "The Origination of the Steel Skeleton Idea." In his letter, Fitzpatrick claimed that he himself had designed steel skeletons in support of church towers prior to 1883, and he had sketched the steel column and horizontal beam design for Buffington's 12-story Tribune building when he was working for Buffington in 1883.

Then in 1912, an article in The Washington Post credited Fitzpatrick with inventing the skyscraper. Claims about Fitzpatrick's role in early skyscraper design were not actively contested, but the opinion of the AIA may have been more accurate.

== Ideas, opinions, and quotations ==
Fitzpatrick was a frequent contributor to various trade publications and newspapers. In his research, historic preservationist Ed Zimmer counted over 200 articles and letters to the editor by Fitzpatrick on architecture and other topics. Fitzpatrick's style was frequently grandiloquent and passionate, but his vision was often accurate.

On the United States Capitol Building,

Grand in the glaring sun, magnificent in a storm, weird and specter-like of a dark night, and a dream of loveliness by moonlight, it stands unsurpassed, from any point of view, by any building in the world.

On progress,

Take Virgil or Horace, how frequently they touch upon the glorious ascension of humanity from savagery to civilization; but they likewise invariably comment upon the decadence of that higher civilization into a posterity more vicious than any of its ancestors.

On government,

The State has always punctiliously enforced the laws that define the duties of the individual toward itself, but it has, at least in times gone by, rather reluctantly recognized its obligations toward the individual and has seldom added anything to its code that obligated it in that direction.

A poem on China,

In China there is no liberty of speech, nor of the press, but there is a public opinion and clearly expressed, nevertheless.

On Social Security (postal insurance),

How better may we correct that national tendency [poverty] than by encouraging the laboring class, from which all the others derive their strength and are so largely recruited, to save money and be provident against an evil time or old age?

On the handwriting of President Cleveland,

You think a great man, a big man in every sense of the word, must needs write a great dashing hand? Not at all. Look at that writing. To the uninitiated it looks clerky. It is the writing of a thinker, an original thinker, a man who can and will do big things and who brooks no opposition while he is doing them.

On corruption at City Hall,

It certainly is most distressing to have a good building code and an able building inspector in a city and to see those advantages completely nullified by a council that will allow certain favorites, privileges not countenanced by that code and that but spell danger to the entire city and to all the work that has been well done.

On the use of concrete in construction,

And so it goes, little by little, what threatened to be but a craze, and a dangerous one at that, will be gotten down to its proper sphere of usefulness, and concrete will become, instead of a thing to be feared, a pliant and efficient detail of construction.

On step-back construction in urban planning,

Arrange it so that buildings can be carried up a certain height, six or seven stories, on narrow streets, eight or nine on wider streets, on the street line, then recess or step back so many feet and go up another prescribed number of stories on that line and then another recess and up again.

On plate glass,

Plate glass is one of the great abominations of modern architecture.

On the Lincoln Memorial,

My prayer to Congress, to the architectural and to the lay press has been that this present appropriation be diverted to such purpose rather than waste it as it most certainly will be if the present plans are carried out. For Washington is already over-cluttered with Greek temples, bronze men on circus horses, gravestones stuck around our parks and streets and other such "artistic junk" in alleged memory of our warriors and other heroes. We are surfeited with such art. In Heaven's name don't inflict any more upon us!

On the boring work of fellow architects,

No, I am not clamoring for an inartistic solution of our practical problems, but I do vociferously pray and beseech my fellows to throw away their fetishes, break up their golden calf and false gods, the Axis, the Great Temple, the Antique, the abject worship of All that Has Been.

On the invention of the skyscraper,

Nevertheless and notwithstanding, I feel a very deep interest in the question. You see, they accuse me of inventing the skyscraper. I do know that I was one of the three men who first sprung it upon an unsuspecting public and have built dozens of it, improved it, fought for it and have been closely knit with it for forty years, and so I am just silly enough, kind of Professor Tiernan-like, to defend the child-since grown into rather robust maturity-whether I be its sole or joint paternal relative.

== Death ==
While crossing the street in Evanston, Fitzpatrick was fatally struck by a car on July 10, 1931. An obituary at the time described his life,

Handsome, tall, graceful, eager, affectionate, generous, an extraordinary athlete, horseman and fencer. Mr. Fitzpatrick was all of these and like Leonardo de Vinci, he was an inventor and an architect.
