= List of University of Minnesota Duluth people =

People distinguished in a variety of fields have graduated from the University of Minnesota Duluth.

== Arts ==
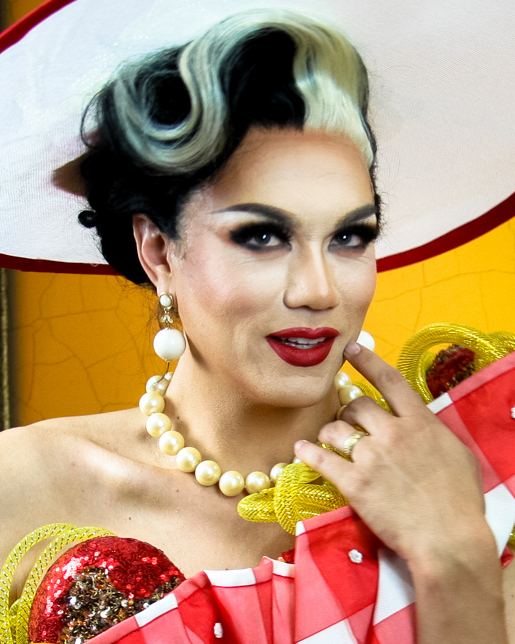
Manila Luzon, drag performer

- Alison Aune - artist
- Jim Brandenburg - National Geographic nature photographer
- Manila Luzon - drag queen, comedian, recording artist, and television personality
- Joel McKinnon Miller - actor on the comedy series Brooklyn Nine-Nine and HBO's Big Love
- Lorenzo Music - actor and voice actor; the voice of Garfield; Carlton the doorman on Rhoda
- Janelle Pierzina - contestant on seasons 6, 7, and 14 of Big Brother
- John R. Reed - academic and majored in music at Duluth
- Kathleen Ridder - philanthropist, educator, writer, women's equality activist
- Ann Royer - painter and sculptor

== Military ==
- Bruce A. Carlson - former director of the National Reconnaissance Office and former four-star general in the Air Force

== Politics ==
- Tom Bakk - former majority leader of the Minnesota Senate (2013–2017)
- Ralph Doty - state senator representing Duluth (1971–1976) and community college administrator
- Eric Eskola - journalist and television personality well known for his coverage of Minnesota politics and government
- Mike Hatch - former Minnesota attorney general (1999–2007); 2006 candidate for governor
- Emily Larson - mayor of Duluth (2016–2024)
- John Linder - former nine-term congressman representing Georgia's 4th, 7th, and 11th districts
- Don Ness - mayor of Duluth (2008–2016)
- Yvonne Prettner Solon - lieutenant governor of Minnesota 2011–2015
- Elwyn Tinklenberg - former Minnesota Department of Transportation commissioner; 2008 congressional candidate for Minnesota's 6th Congressional District

== Science and engineering ==
- Brian Kobilka - 2012 Nobel Prize winner in chemistry
- David Madson - architect, LGBTQ+ and HIV/AIDS activist
- Amit Singhal - former senior vice president at Google

== Business ==
- Bill Aho - former CEO of ClearPlay; played an instrumental role turning around Red Lobster while senior vice president for Darden Restaurants
- David Oreck - founder of the Oreck Corporation
- Robert Senkler - chairman and CEO of Securian Financial Group

== Sports ==
- Bob Davidson - Major League Baseball umpire since 1982 (attended, but did not graduate)
- Dan Devine - head football coach with the Missouri Tigers, Green Bay Packers and Notre Dame Fighting Irish
- Korey Dropkin - Olympic curling medalist
- Jay Guidinger - center with the Cleveland Cavaliers
- Tod Kowalczyk - UW - Green Bay and Toledo head men's basketball coach
- Scott LeDoux - professional boxer
- Ted McKnight - NFL running back with the Kansas City Chiefs and Buffalo Bills
- Jeff Monson - grappling and MMA fighter
- Dick Pesonen - NFL player
- John Shuster - Olympic curling medalist
- David Viaene - NFL player with the New England Patriots and Green Bay Packers

=== Men's hockey ===
- Greg Andrusak - NHL player with the Pittsburgh Penguins, Toronto Maple Leafs, and San Jose Sharks
- Pat Boutette - NHL player with the Toronto Maple Leafs, Hartford Whalers, and Pittsburgh Penguins
- J. T. Brown - NHL player with the Tampa Bay Lightning
- Chad Erickson - NHL player with the New Jersey Devils
- Justin Faulk - NHL player with the Carolina Hurricanes
- Jesse Fibiger - NHL player with the San Jose Sharks
- Rusty Fitzgerald - NHL player with the Pittsburgh Penguins
- Justin Fontaine - NHL player with the Minnesota Wild
- Jason Garrison - NHL player with the Florida Panthers
- Curt Giles - NHL player with the Minnesota North Stars, St. Louis Blues, and New York Rangers
- John Harrington - member of 1980 U.S. Olympic hockey gold-medal team that beat the USSR in the Miracle on Ice game
- Brett Hull - NHL player with Calgary Flames, St. Louis Blues, Dallas Stars, Detroit Red Wings, and Phoenix Coyotes; 3rd all-time in the NHL with 741 goals
- Alex Iafallo - NHL player with the Los Angeles Kings
- Adam Johnson - NHL player for the Pittsburgh Penguins
- Jim Johnson - NHL player with the Pittsburgh Penguins, Minnesota North Stars, Washington Capitals, and Phoenix Coyotes
- Tom Kurvers - Hobey Baker Award winner in 1983; NHL player with the Montreal Canadiens, Buffalo Sabres, New Jersey Devils, Toronto Maple Leafs, Vancouver Canucks, New York Islanders, and Mighty Ducks of Anaheim
- Dave Langevin - WHA player with the Edmonton Oilers; NHL player with the New York Islanders, Minnesota North Stars, and Los Angeles Kings
- Junior Lessard - Hobey Baker Award winner in 2004; NHL player with the Dallas Stars, Atlanta Thrashers, and Tampa Bay Lightning
- Chris Marinucci - Hobey Baker Award winner in 1994; player with the Los Angeles Kings, and New York Islanders
- Bob Mason - NHL player with the Washington Capitals, Chicago Blackhawks, Quebec Nordiques, and Vancouver Canucks
- Bryan McGregor - Czech Extraliga player with HC Oceláři Třinec
- Rick Mrozik - NHL player with the Calgary Flames
- Matt Niskanen - NHL player with the Dallas Stars and Pittsburgh Penguins
- Evan Oberg - NHL player with the Vancouver Canucks and Florida Panthers
- Mark Pavelich - member of 1980 U.S. Olympic hockey gold-medal team that beat the USSR in the Miracle on Ice game; played in the NHL with the New York Rangers, Minnesota North Stars, and San Jose Sharks
- Mike Peluso - played in the NHL with the Chicago Blackhawks; not to be confused with Mike Peluso, who also played with the Blackhawks
- Derek Plante - NHL player with Buffalo Sabres, Dallas Stars, and the Philadelphia Flyers
- Shjon Podein - NHL player with the Edmonton Oilers, Philadelphia Flyers, Colorado Avalanche, St. Louis Blues; Stanley Cup winner in 2000–01 with Colorado Avalanche
- Mason Raymond - NHL player with the Vancouver Canucks
- Glen "Chico" Resch - NHL goalie with the Colorado Rockies, New York Islanders and New Jersey Devils
- Jon Rohloff - NHL player with the Boston Bruins
- Jay Rosehill - NHL player with the Toronto Maple Leafs
- Alex Stalock - NHL goaltender with the Minnesota Wild and San Jose Sharks
- Tim Stapleton - NHL player with the Toronto Maple Leafs, Atlanta Thrashers, and the relocated Atlanta team Winnipeg Jets
- Dennis Vaske - NHL player with the New York Islanders, Boston Bruins
- Bill Watson - Hobey Baker Award winner in 1984; NHL player with the Chicago Blackhawks
- Craig Weller - NHL player with the Phoenix Coyotes, and Minnesota Wild
- Larry Wright - NHL player with the Philadelphia Flyers, California Golden Seals, and the Detroit Red Wings

=== Women's hockey ===
- Haley Irwin
- Kim Martin
- Caroline Ouellette
- Tuula Puputti
- Maddie Rooney
- Maria Rooth
- Jenny Schmidgall-Potter
- Hanne Sikio
- Saara Tuominen
