= Doty (surname) =

Doty is a surname, most common in the United States and recorded there as early as the 1620 voyage of the Mayflower. The origins and etymology of the surname are a matter of debate. Some sources trace Doty to northern England and to Yorkshire in particular, although there is no agreement as to whether it is a variant of Doughty (and Dowty), Dodd, or another, similar-sounding name.

- Al Doty (born 1945), American politician from Minnesota
- Cecil J. Doty (1907–1990), architect
- Charles Doty (1824–1918), Wisconsin pioneer, surveyor, military officer, and state legislator
- Charles R. Doty (1924–2003), American politician and write-in presidential candidate
- Chris Doty (1966–2006), Canadian filmmaker
- Danielle Doty (born 1993) beauty queen
- David B. Doty (born 1950), composer
- Edward Doty (1599–1655), indentured servant on the Mayflower
- Gary Doty (born 1948), American politician from Minnesota
- James Doty (physician) (1955–2025), neurologist
- James Duane Doty (1799–1865), American politician from Wisconsin and the Utah Territory
- Kathryn Adams Doty (1920–2016), actress
- Ken Andrews (born Kenneth Andrew Doty 1967), American musician, singer-songwriter, and record producer
- Madeleine Zabriskie Doty (1877–1963), journalist, pacifist and civil libertarian
- Mark Doty (born 1953), poet
- Paul M. Doty (1920–2011), scientist
- Phoebe Doty (died 1849), 19th century prostitute
- Ralph Doty (1941–2020), American politician from Minnesota
- Richard (Rick) Doty (born 1944), a scientist featured in the documentary Mirage Men
- Robert W. Doty (1920–2011) neuroscientist
- Roy Doty (1922–2015), cartoonist
- Shirley Doty (1930 –2001) American politician from Washington
- Sile Doty (1800–1876), 19th century outlaw
- Stephen R. Doty, (born 1953), mathematician
- Terri Doty (born 1984) voice actor
- Thomas Doty (1928–1962), carried out a murder/suicide plot involving Continental Airlines Flight 11
- Wayne C. Doty (born 1973), Florida murderer
- William Doty (1852–1919), American politician from Michigan
- William G. Doty (scholar) (1939–2017), religious studies scholar and educator
- Winston and Weston Doty (1914–1934), twin child actors

== See also ==
- Doty (disambiguation)
