= Roger Reinert =

American politician (born 1970)

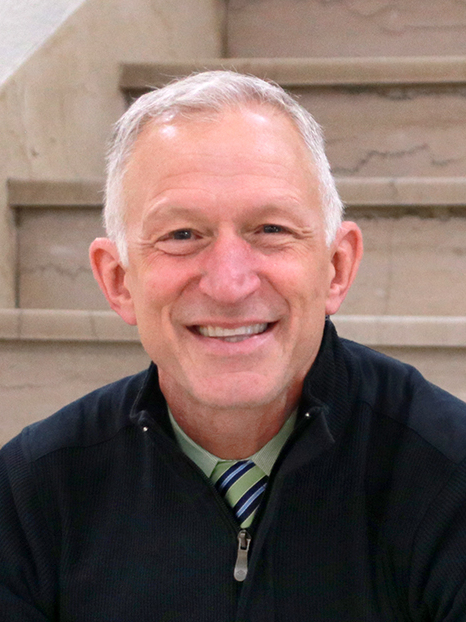
- Reinert in 2023

41st Mayor of Duluth
- Incumbent
- Assumed office January 4, 2024
- Preceded by: Emily Larson

Member of the Minnesota Senate from the 7th district
- In office January 4, 2011 – January 2, 2017
- Preceded by: Yvonne Prettner Solon
- Succeeded by: Erik Simonson

Member of the Minnesota House of Representatives from the 7B district
- In office January 6, 2009 – January 3, 2011
- Preceded by: Mike Jaros
- Succeeded by: Kerry Gauthier

Personal details
- Born: July 22, 1970 (age 56) Olivia, Minnesota, U.S.
- Party: Democratic (DFL)
- Education: University of Minnesota; Minnesota State University, Mankato; Mitchell Hamline School of Law
- Occupation: Attorney

Military service
- Allegiance: United States
- Branch/service: United States Navy; United States Navy Reserve; Temporary duty assignment
- Years of service: 2005-present
- Rank: Commander
- Commands: PACFLT, CSTC-A
- Awards: Defense Meritorious Service Medal; Navy and Marine Corps Commendation Medal

Roger Jonathon Reinert (born July 22, 1970) is an American politician, 40th mayor of Duluth, Minnesota, and member of the Minnesota Democratic–Farmer–Labor Party (DFL). He served in the Minnesota House from 2009 to 2011 and the Minnesota Senate from 2011 to 2017.

From 2004 to 2009, Reinert served on the Duluth City Council, where he was elected president twice. Reinert spent six years (2011–2016) serving on the Minnesota Senate, where he represented District 7, which included St. Louis County. Two years prior to this (2009–2010), Reinert served on the Minnesota House of Representatives. Currently, Reinert is a Commander in the U.S. Navy Reserves. Reinert is a licensed attorney, owns a consulting firm, and teaches at the College of Saint Scholastica in Duluth.

== Early life and education ==
Reinert was born in Olivia, Minnesota and was raised in Dawson, Minnesota. He is one of seven siblings. Reinert graduated from Dawson-Boyd High School in 1988. He received an Associate of Science at Ridgewater College, a Bachelor's Degree in Secondary Education at the University of Minnesota, Twin Cities, and a Master's Degree in Education, Curriculum and Instruction at Minnesota State University, Mankato. In 2014, Reinert attended Mitchell Hamline School of Law in Saint Paul, and graduated with a Doctor of Law (J.D.) in 2018. Reinert passed the Bar Examination (MBE) in 2019, and was admitted to practice later that same year.

== Career ==
Reinert began a political career when he was appointed to the Duluth City Council on January 12, 2004, filling the seat vacated by Herb Bergson, who had been elected mayor. In 2005, after completing Officer Training at Pensacola Naval Air Station in Florida, Reinert was commissioned as a Selected Reserve (SELRES) Naval Officer for the U.S. Navy Reserves. Shortly thereafter, Reinert was elected as City Council President, serving in 2006 and 2008. During this time, Reinert also worked as an educator at the University of Minnesota Duluth and Lake Superior College.

Following Reinert's second presidential term on the Duluth City Council, he was elected into the Minnesota House of Representatives in 2008 for the Democratic-Farmer-Labor Party (DFL), and represented Saint Louis County in this position until 2010. He was a member of the House Taxes Committee, and also served on the Finance subcommittees for the Higher Education and Workforce Development Finance and Policy Division, the Public Safety Finance Division, and the Transportation Finance and Policy Division. Following this, he was elected into the Minnesota State Senate under the DFL representing Saint Louis County (District 7). Reinert was re-elected in 2012, defeating challenger Tyler Verry. He did not seek re-election in 2016.

In 2018 and 2019 Reinert was deployed to Afghanistan as a military public affairs officer. Upon his return in 2019, opened a legal and consulting firm, Reinert & Associates, where he acts as an attorney and managing partner. In March 2020, amidst the start of the COVID-19 pandemic, Reinert was deployed to Italy as part of an anti-virus crisis communications team. Reinert served as the Interim Executive Director at the Duluth Entertainment Convention Center (DECC) from June 2020–May 2021.

In November 2021, the Secretary of the Navy awarded the Navy and Marine Corps Commendation Medal to Reinert due to his work during his COVID deployment in 2020. As of 2022, Reinert is still actively serving in the U.S. Navy Reserve. He is currently the Executive Officer of the Navy Public Affairs Element Headquarters (NPASE). Reinert is the Director of Public Relations/Media for the Duluth Air and Aviation Expo, and teaches at the College of St. Scholastica.

Reinert was elected mayor of Duluth, Minnesota in 2023, defeating incumbent mayor Emily Larson by a margin of 60%–40%. Reinert was sworn in as mayor on January 2, 2024.

== Electoral history ==
Duluth, Minnesota mayoral election, 2023
Party	Candidate	Votes	%	±%
Nonpartisan	Roger Reinert	17,518	59.8	
Nonpartisan	Emily Larson (incumbent)	11,716	40.0	

Minnesota Senate 7th district election, 2012
Party	Candidate	Votes	%	±%
Democratic (DFL)	Roger Reinert	32,684	76.90	
Republican	Tyler Verry	9,621	22.64	

Minnesota Senate 7th district election, 2010
Party	Candidate	Votes	%	±%
Democratic (DFL)	Roger Reinert	19,545	72.73	
Republican	Rilla Debot Opelt	7,268	27.05	

Minnesota House of Representatives 7B district election, 2008
Party	Candidate	Votes	%	±%
Democratic (DFL)	Roger Reinert	13,364	72.96	
Republican	Alan Kehr	3,648	19.91	
Independence	Jay Cole	1,259	6.87	
