= Liish Kozlowski =

American politician (born 1988)

- Ozaawaa Anakwad (Ojibwe)
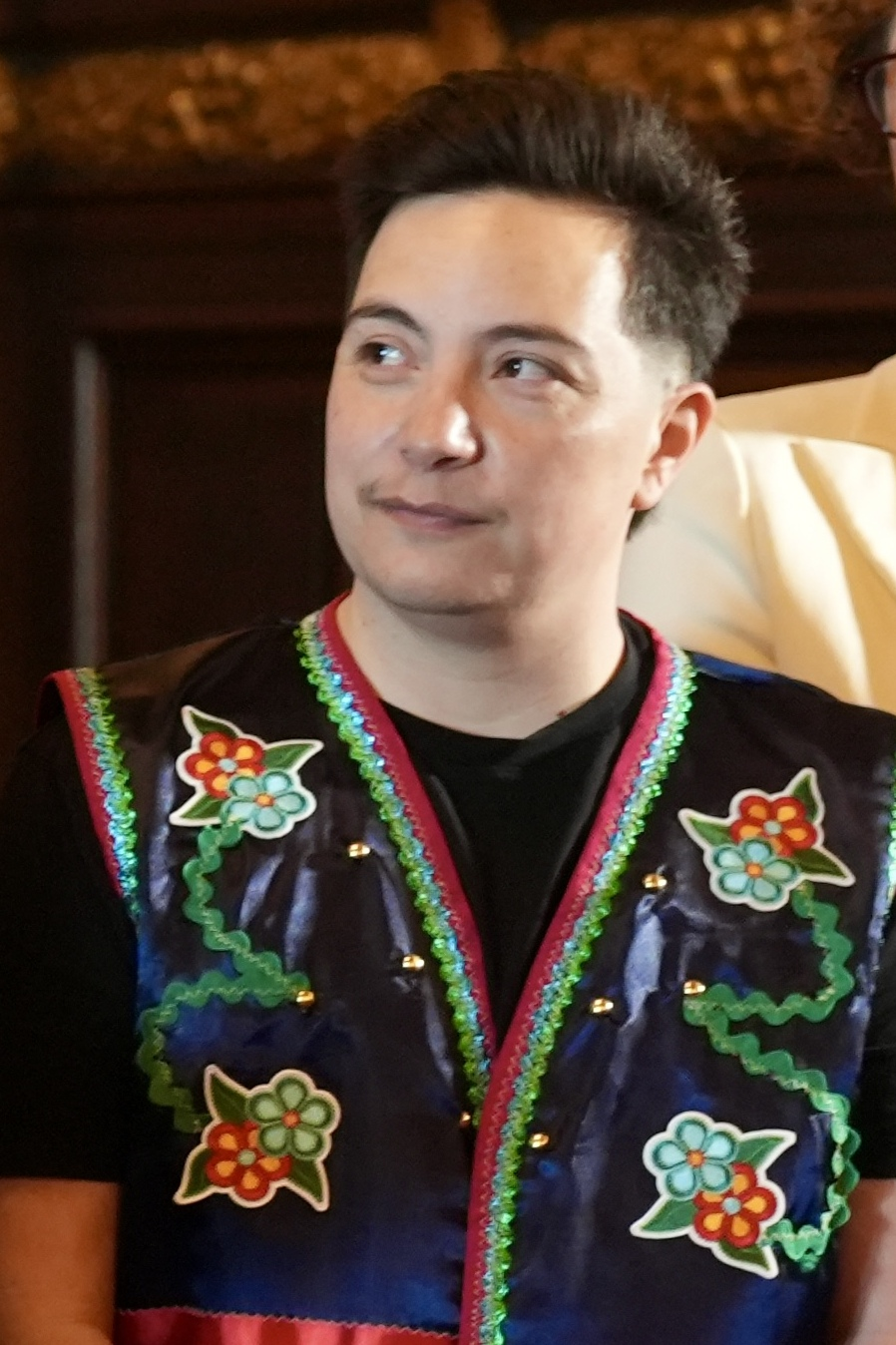

Member of the Minnesota House of Representatives from the 8B district
- Incumbent
- Assumed office January 3, 2023
- Preceded by: Jennifer Schultz

Personal details
- Born: January 12, 1988 (age 38) Duluth, Minnesota, U.S.
- Party: Democratic
- Children: 1
- Education: University of Minnesota Duluth (BA); College of St. Scholastica (MBA)
- Occupation: Community relations officer; Legislator
- Website: Government website Campaign website

Liish Kozlowski (/liʃ kəzˈlaʊski/; Ojibwe: Ozaawaa Anakwad; born January 12, 1988) is an American politician serving as a member of the Minnesota House of Representatives since 2023. A member of the Minnesota Democratic-Farmer-Labor Party (DFL), Kozlowski represents District 8B in northeastern Minnesota, which includes the city of Duluth and parts of St. Louis County. They are the first openly trans-nonbinary state legislator in Minnesota.

== Early life, education and career ==
Born in Duluth, Minnesota, Kozlowski is the child of a Mexican union electrician father and a Grand Portage/Fond du Lac Band Ojibwe mother. They were raised by their grandmother and adopted in adulthood by a native family. Their adoptive father, Ray "Skip" Sandman, was an Anishinaabe spiritual leader and ran twice for Minnesota's 8th Congressional District.

Kozlowski is a first-generation college graduate, earning a Bachelor of Arts degree in history from the University of Minnesota Duluth in 2009 and a Master of Business Administration from the College of St. Scholastica in 2017.

From 2019 to 2021, Kozlowski worked as a community relations officer for the City of Duluth under Mayor Emily Larson, where they helped create a Missing and Murdered Indigenous Women, Girls, and Two Spirit People Reward Fund, the first in Minnesota.

== Minnesota House of Representatives ==
Kozlowski was elected to the Minnesota House of Representatives in November 2022. They first ran after four-term DFL incumbent Jennifer Schultz announced they would not seek reelection and would run for the 8th Congressional District. Kozlowski defeated Duluth City Council president Arik Forsman in the DFL primary. When they took office, Kozlowski became the first openly trans non-binary member of the Minnesota Legislature and the second two-spirit member after Susan Allen, in addition to the first Mexican, Ojibwe, and trans non-binary or two-spirit person to represent Duluth.

Kozlowski serves on the Capital Investment and Economic Development Finance and Policy Committees and is co-vice chair of the Housing Finance and Policy and Labor and Industry Finance and Policy Committees. They co-chair the House People of Color and Indigenous (POCI) Caucus and are a member of the legislature's first Queer Caucus, made up of LGBTQ+ members.

Kozlowski was highlighted as part of Minnesota Public Radio's 2023 "Changemakers" series, which showcases Minnesotans from diverse backgrounds making an impact in the state.

=== Political positions ===
Kozlowski campaigned on increasing support for working families through universal childcare and fully-funded education, protecting the environment through "prove it first" mining permit legislation, and affordable healthcare for all.

Kozlowski is pro-choice and supports increasing abortion access for people of color, gender-expansive people, and immigrants. They have spoken out in favor of legislation making Minnesota a "trans refuge state" for those seeking gender-affirming care and have pushed for creating inclusive schools and increasing housing access for disadvantaged communities. Kozlowski authored a law adding gender-neutral bathrooms in Minnesota schools in 2023. They also authored a bill to ban nonessential cosmetic procedures on intersex children under 12, which did not make it to a vote.

Kozlowski championed efforts to increase funding for the state's Missing and Murdered Indigenous Relatives Office. Native American women, girls, and Two Spirit relatives are only 1% of Minnesota's population but made up 8% of all murdered women, girls, and Two Spirit people from 2010 through 2018.

== Electoral results ==
2022 Minnesota State House - District 8B
Party	Candidate	Votes	%
Democratic (DFL)	Liish Kozlowski	14,593	70.95
Republican	Becky Hall	5,929	28.83
Write-in		45	0.22
Total votes		20,567	100.00
Democratic (DFL) hold			

2024 Minnesota State House - District 8B
Party	Candidate	Votes	%
Democratic (DFL)	Liish Kozlowski	17,440	68.53
Republican	Shawn Savela	7,954	31.25
Write-in		55	0.22
Total votes		25,449	100.00
Democratic (DFL) hold			

== Personal life ==
Kozlowski lives in Duluth, Minnesota. Their Ojibwe name is Ozaawaa Anakwad ("Yellow Cloud") and they identify as trans, non-binary, and two-spirit.
