= Ben Boo =

American politician (1925–2021)

34th Mayor of Duluth
- In office 1967–1975
- Preceded by: George D. Johnson
- Succeeded by: Robert Beaudin

Member of the Minnesota House of Representatives from the 8B district
- In office 1984–1993
- Preceded by: Thomas Berkelman
- Succeeded by: Thomas Huntley (new District 6B)

Personal details
- Born: January 21, 1925 Pine City, Minnesota, U.S.
- Died: December 1, 2021 (aged 96) Duluth, Minnesota, U.S.
- Party: Republican
- Spouse: Mary
- Profession: Legislator, mayor

Benjamin Boo Jr. (January 21, 1925 – December 1, 2021) was an American politician in the state of Minnesota. He served as the 33rd mayor of Duluth from 1967 to 1975, and as a member of the Minnesota House of Representatives representing District 8B from 1984 to 1993.

== Life and career ==
Boo was born in Pine City, Minnesota. He served in the United States Army and the Minnesota National Guard during World War II, the Korean War, and the Vietnam War. He went to the University of Minnesota and the University of Missouri.

A Republican, Boo was first elected Duluth's mayor in 1966 and was re-elected in 1970. During his time in office, he was involved with advancing tourism in Duluth, including the creation of Spirit Mountain. After leaving office, he became executive director in the Western Lake Superior Sanitary District (WLSSD), a position he held until 1979.

Boo later ran for the open seat in House District 8A in a 1983 special election held after the resignation of Rep. Tom Berkelman. He was elected, and was re-elected in 1984, 1986, 1988 and 1990. At the time, the district included portions of St. Louis County.

While in the House, Boo was a member of the Appropriations, Financial Institutions and Housing, General Legislation, Veterans Affairs and Gaming, Health and Human Services, Redistricting, and Regulated Industries committees. He also served on the Financial Institutions and Insurance subcommittees for the Banking Division and the Housing Division, the General Legislation, Veterans Affairs and Gaming subcommittees for the Elections Division, for Gaming and for Veterans Affairs, and the Health and Human Services subcommittees for Transitional Services and for Social and Family Services. He served as an assistant minority leader during the 1991–1992 biennium.

Boo died in Duluth on December 1, 2021, at the age of 96.

== See also ==
- List of mayors of Duluth, Minnesota

Party political offices
Preceded by James B. Goetz	Republican nominee for Lieutenant Governor of Minnesota; 1970	Succeeded by Dwaine Hoberg
