= Kerry Gauthier =

American politician (born 1955)

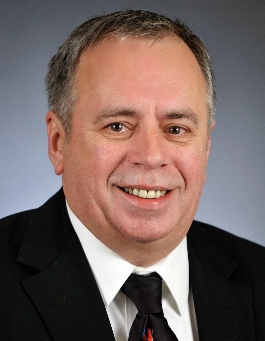

Member of the Minnesota House of Representatives from the 7B district
- In office January 2011 – January 7, 2013
- Preceded by: Roger Reinert
- Succeeded by: district redrawn

Member of the Duluth City Council
- In office January 2010 – December 2, 2010

Treasurer for the Minnesota Democratic Farmer Labor Party
- In office May 21, 2005 – June 26, 2006

Personal details
- Born: November 6, 1955 (age 71)
- Education: College of St. Scholastica; University of Wisconsin at Superior
- Profession: Social services case manager, legislator

Kerry Gauthier (born November 6, 1955) is an American politician who served in the Minnesota House of Representatives from 2011 to 2013, representing portions of St. Louis County. A Democrat, he served as Treasurer for the Minnesota Democratic-Farmer-Labor Party from 2005 to 2006, and Democratic Chairman of the state's 8th Congressional District from 2000 to 2006. He had been an alderman for the Duluth City Council and campaign consultant, notably for Becky Lourey in the 2006 Minnesota gubernatorial election. He retired in 2013 in the wake of a sex scandal.

== Education and political career ==
Born in Duluth, Gauthier graduated from Morgan Park High School and received his Bachelor of Arts degree at the College of St. Scholastica and his Master of Science in Counseling from the University of Wisconsin–Superior. Prior to entering politics, he was a social services case manager at Lake Superior Treatment Center.

From 2000 to 2006, Gauthier succeeded and preceded party activist Don Bye as the chairman of Minnesota's 8th congressional district. In June 2006, he supported Becky Lourey's primary run in the 2006 Minnesota gubernatorial election against the party-endorsed candidate, Mike Hatch. He resigned as treasurer of the state Democratic Party to assist her campaign. He was elected to the Duluth City Council in 2009 and served until his election to the Minnesota House of Representatives in 2010.

Gauthier was elected to the legislature filling the seat vacated by Roger Reinert who opted to run for the Minnesota Senate. He served on the Public Safety and Crime Prevention Policy and Finance, the State Government Finance, and the Transportation Policy and Finance committees. He is also a member of the Planned Parenthood Regional Advisory Committee.

In 2012, Gauthier endorsed Rick Nolan for United States Congress in Minnesota's 8th congressional district.

== Personal life ==
Gauthier was one of four openly gay politicians serving in the Minnesota Legislature during his tenure.

On August 15, 2012, Gauthier became embroiled in a sex scandal after a liaison with a 17-year-old male at the Thompson Hill rest stop near Duluth. The age of consent is 16 under Minnesota law and Gauthier did not face any criminal wrongdoing. However, in light of the media controversy and proximity to Minnesota Amendment 1, legislative leaders called for him to step aside. Gauthier subsequently withdrew from the 2012 election stating, "I am a better person than this incident portrayed me." His final public statement discussed struggling to come to terms with his sexuality. The Minnesota Supreme Court granted the Democratic Farmer-Labor Party permission to replace his name on the general election ballot. He was succeeded by Duluth firefighter and labor activist Erik Simonson.
