= Gravie =

Gravie is a health insurance marketplace headquartered in Minneapolis, Minnesota. Gravie provides individually-tailored recommendations to individuals who are in the process of purchasing health insurance. They are a licensed third-party administrator (TPA) that administers both level-funded health plans and an ICHRA solution.

Gravie offers health plans both on the federal and state health exchanges and off-exchange in the private, individual market, and is an alternative to group health coverage for businesses.

== History ==
Abir Sen, CEO, launched Gravie on November 15, 2013 with co-founders Jill Prevost and Marek Ciolko and $2.6 million in initial investor funding from FirstMark Capital. On March 17, 2014, the company announced $10.5 million in additional investor funding led by Aberdare Ventures. FirstMark Capital also participated in the second round of funding.

After a further round of funding in 2015, in 2016 the firm laid off 21 employees.

In 2016 Securian Financial Group invested in Gravie and began selling its life insurance products through Gravie's website.
