= Senator Doty =

Senator Doty may refer to:

- Ralph Doty (1941–2020), Minnesota State Senate
- Sally Doty (born 1966), Mississippi State Senate
