= Bentleyville Tour of Lights =

Walk-through lighting display

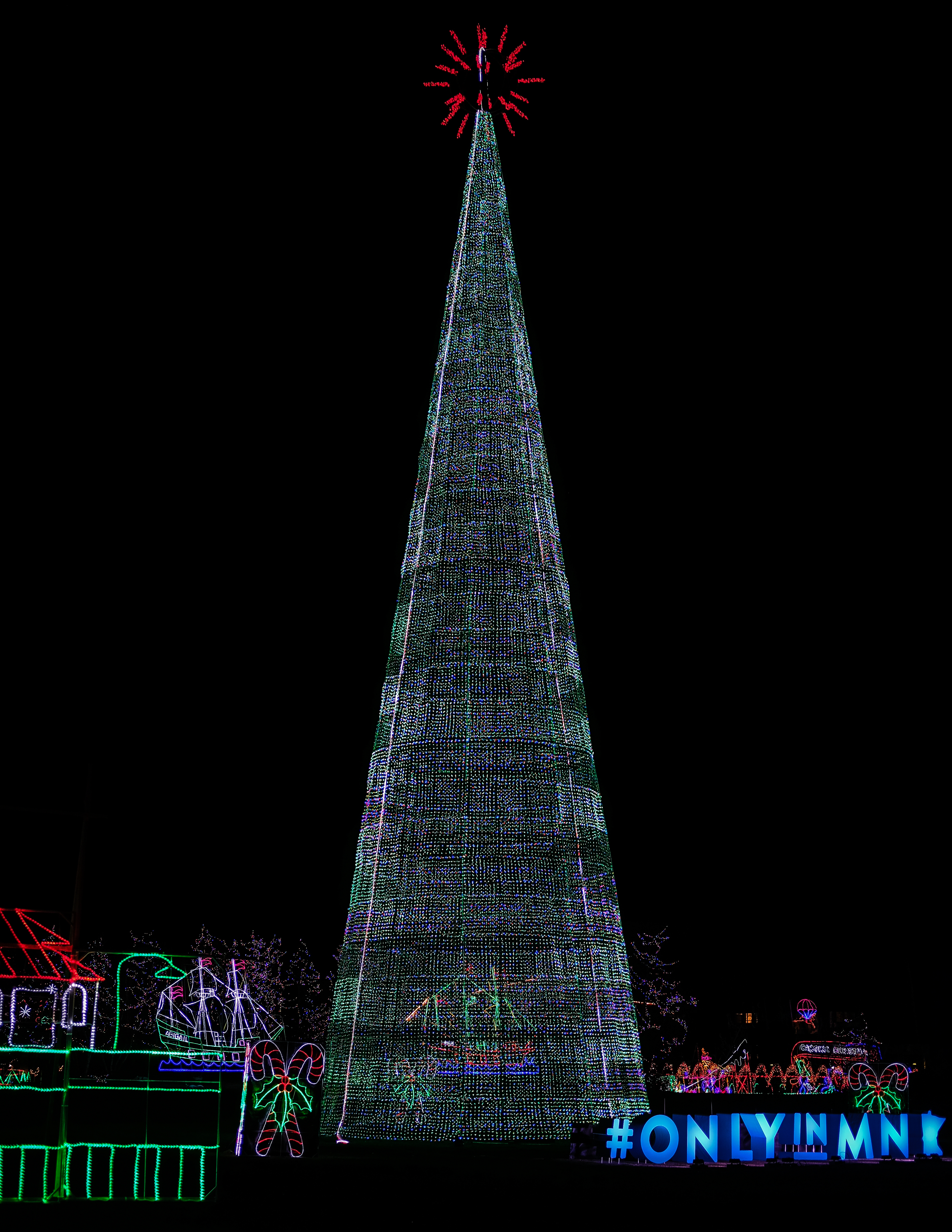
Christmas tree at the 2017 light display

Bentleyville "Tour of Lights" is one of America's largest free walk-through lighting displays. It is located in Duluth, Minnesota and runs annually from November 21 to December 27. The 2020 season of the attraction introduced a new drive-through layout, to better fit and help with restrictions due to the COVID-19 pandemic, and returned to its traditional walk-through format for the year 2021.

== Description ==
Bentleyville is a free light display in Duluth, Minnesota. It is a non-profit organization open every day from November 18,2023 through December 26, 2023, from 5:00 pm to 9:00 pm Sunday-Thursday, and 5:00 pm to 10:00 pm on Fridays and Saturdays. Admission is FREE and the cost to park is $10 per vehicle.

The event is a walk-through display where visitors can walk through different light tunnels and other illuminated paths to view the large scenes of lights depicting various holiday figures and local attractions around the Duluth area. Complimentary hot cocoa, cookies, popcorn, and marshmallows are available to all guests, 15 different fire pits are available for guests to warm up by halfway through the display, and visitors can visit Santa Claus and Mrs. Claus in their meet-and-greet location. Kids 10 and under received a new knit hat and a bag of cookies when they visit Santa.

Bentleyville is also the official drop off site for new unwrapped toys and nonperishable food items for the Salvation Army. Food and toys donated at Bentleyville are distributed to 7 communities: Duluth, Cloquet, Virginia, Grand Rapids, Hibbing, International Falls, MN and Superior, WI.

== History ==
Nathan Bentley first decorated his home with lights in Esko, Minnesota in 2001. He added more and more lights for the next two years to make his display bigger every year, eventually Bentley's house was known as "the house with all of the lights in Esko." By 2003, Bentley transformed his house from a drive by to a walk through, with Santa visiting on the weekends. One of Bentley's friends eventually started referring to his house as Bentleyville (a play on words from Dr. Seuss's "Whoville"). Bentleyville "Tour of lights" was born. In 2004, the Bentleys moved from Esko to Cloquet, Minnesota. To get people and the usual visitors to come out to see it, Bentley built a larger and brighter display. He built a 78' x 24' entrance made with 45,000 lights to greet people. There were over 500 lit-up snowflakes hung from trees all over his property; dozens of displays were created and many were added every year. School groups and community musicians were added to add live entertainment. Fire pits were put in for visitors to gather around, warm up and roast marshmallows. Santa starting showing up every night as a permanent guest. Kids who came to visit Santa got a free winter hat and a bag of cookies. Eventually a building was constructed, where inside, free cookies, coffee and apple cider were offered. This became known as "The Cookie House". The "Popcorn House" was added soon after for visitors to enjoy free popcorn while walking through the lights.

=== Move to Duluth ===
The popularity of Bentleyville grew and so did the traffic. The Bentleys lived on a dead-end country road so there wasn't much room to park. After two years and 35,000 visitors, Bentley decided he needed to build parking lots in fields nearby with buses bringing the visitors to the entrance. In 2008, with 5 years of hosting Bentleyville at his houses, Bentley took a year off to think about how everything was working and to make it better. In the fall, the Duluth City Mayor, Don Ness, called Bentley asking if he would bring Bentleyville to Bayfront Festival Park in Duluth, for a year trial. Ness thought Bayfront Park was a perfect fit for Bentleyville. Bentley asked his original team members to organize the Christmas light show. He needed 600 volunteers and 10 weeks to help set up.

On Friday, November 27, 2009 Bentleyville turned on its millions of lights for thousands of visitors for the first time in Bayfront Park. There was over 150,000 visitors that came to enjoy the sounds and lights of winter.

=== Expansion ===
On January 8, 2010 Bentleyville announced that it had decided to return to Bayfront Park for the next three years. Those three years helped with a lot of expansion in Bentleyville with adding the famous 128 foot lit up, animated tree as the main piece, right in the center of Bentleyville. Every year more and more displays were added, in 2011 Dino Land, a gift shop, more light tunnels, heaters in the line for Santa Claus, and a new home for Mrs. Claus was added. In 2012, Santa skydived into Bentleyville on opening night, visitors welcomed Thomas the Tank Engine in the displays, and the attendance made it to over 206,000 people.

=== Pandemic modifications ===
Due to the ongoing COVID-19 pandemic, Bentleyville announced that it would be offering a drive-thru display as a replacement for its traditional walk-through display. The plans for a drive-thru display were announced on September 9, 2020 during a press conference held by Nathan Bentley. The drive-thru display would use the same lighted scenes and displays as previous years but would have visitors drive through the display in their vehicles instead of walking through it on foot.

== Gallery ==
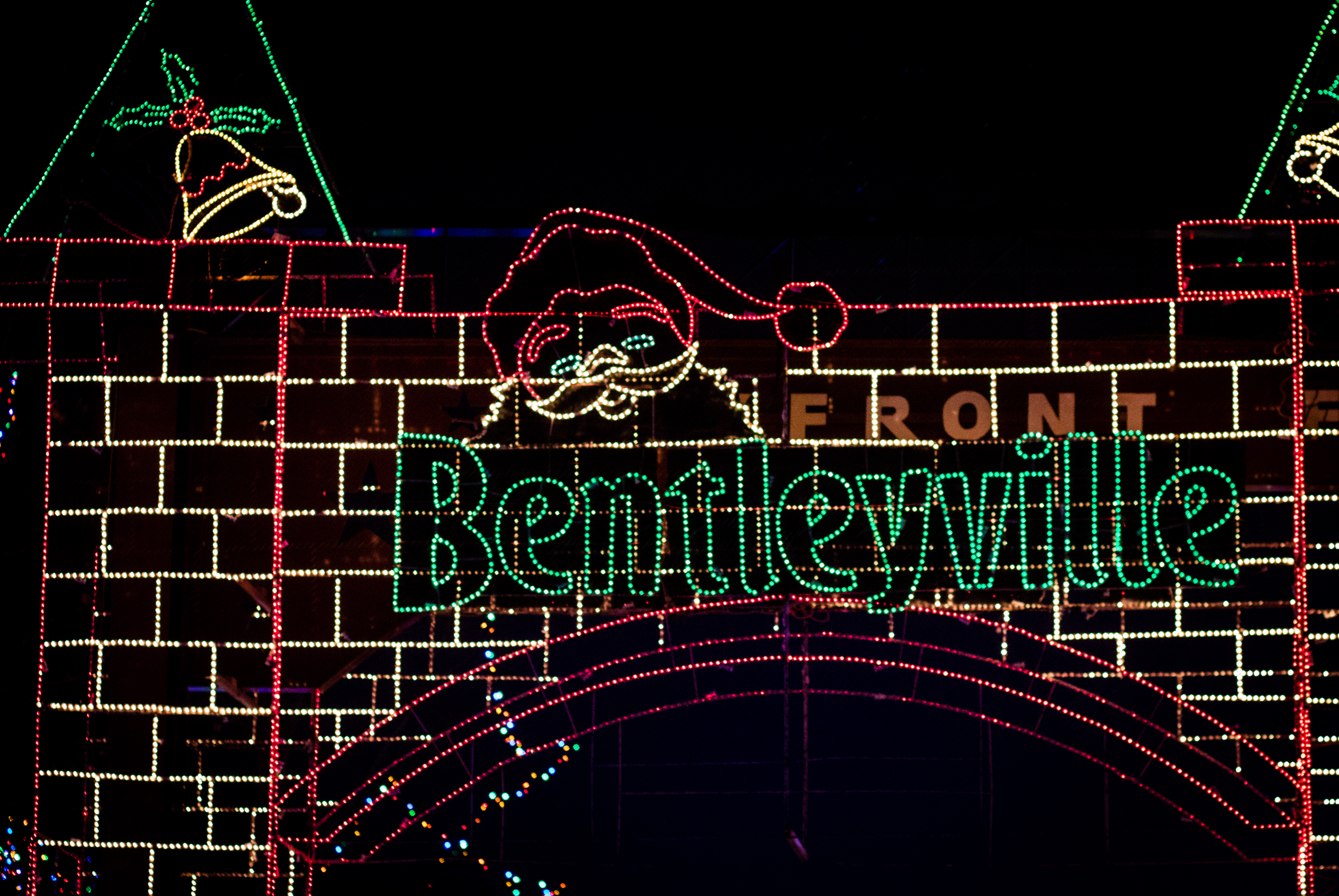
Front entrance

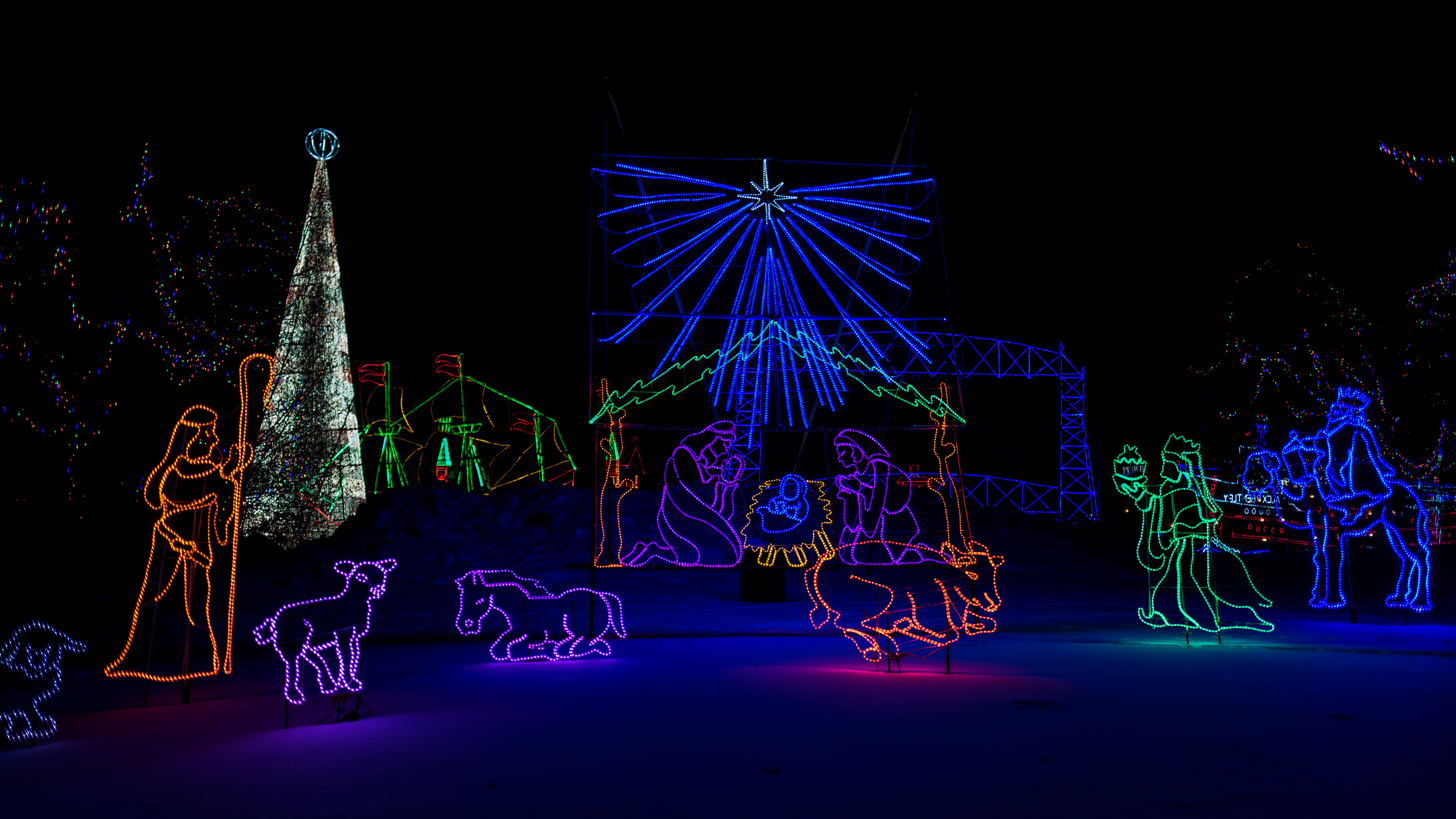
Nativity scene

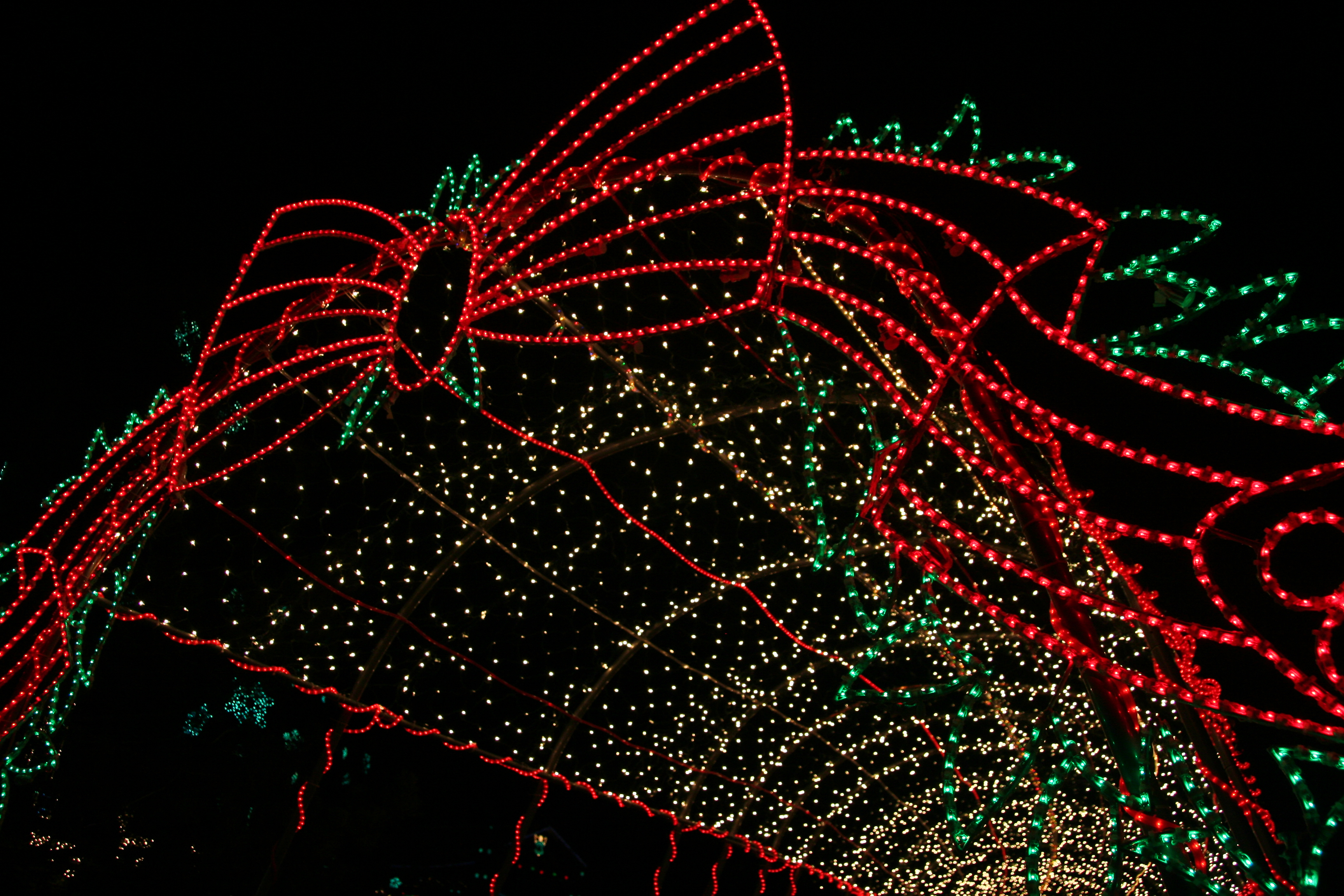
Archway

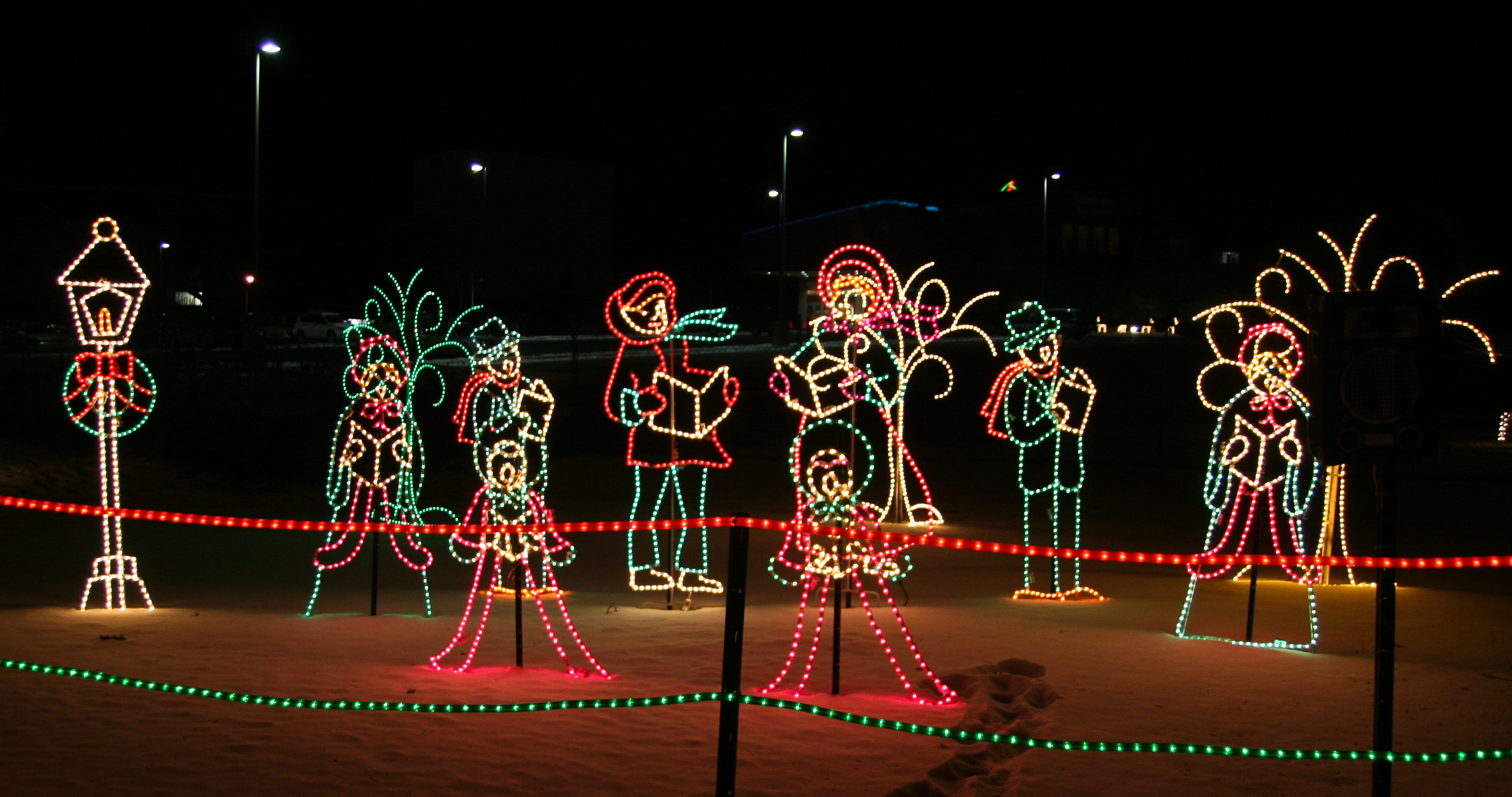
Carolers

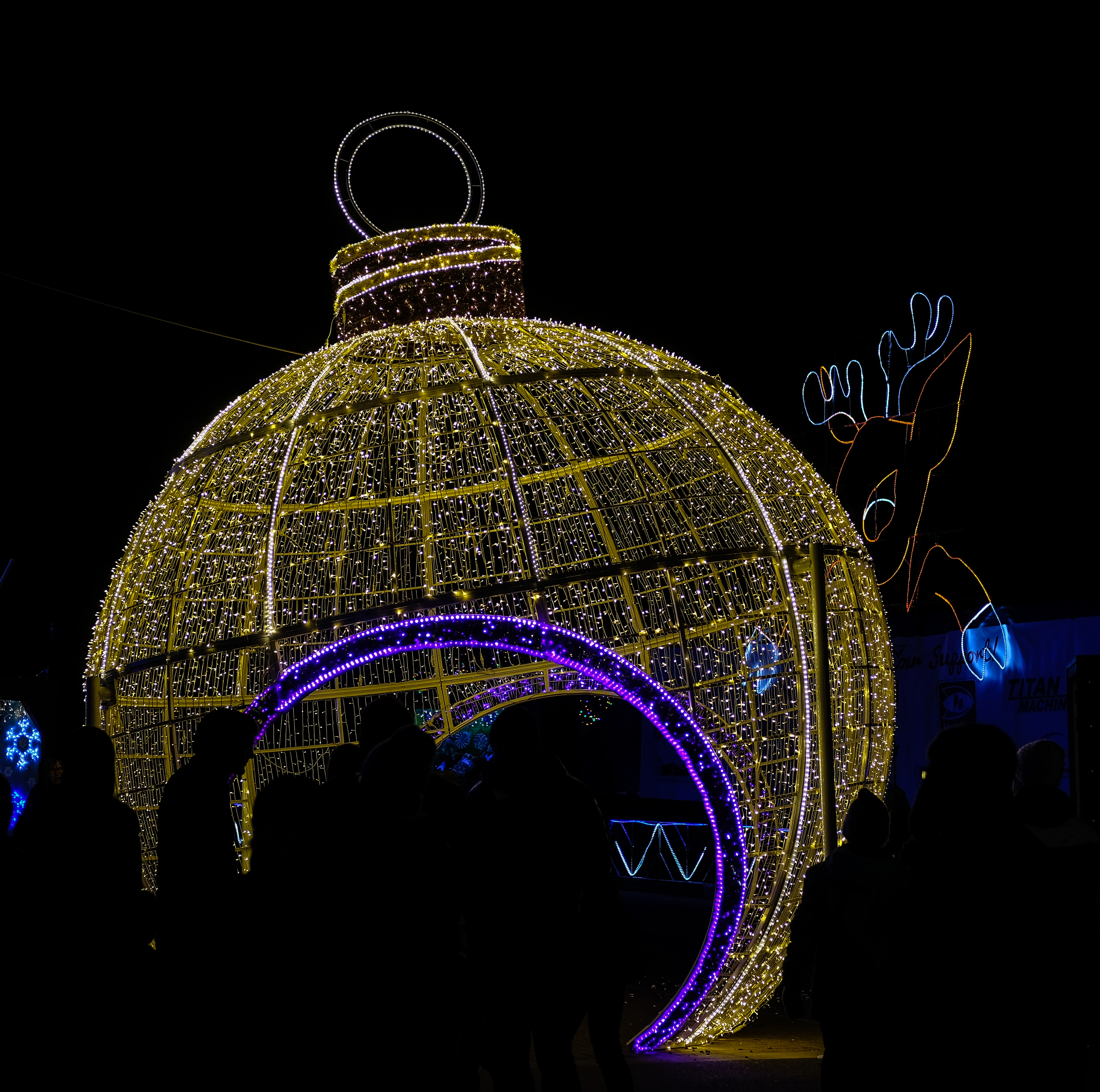
Christmas bauble

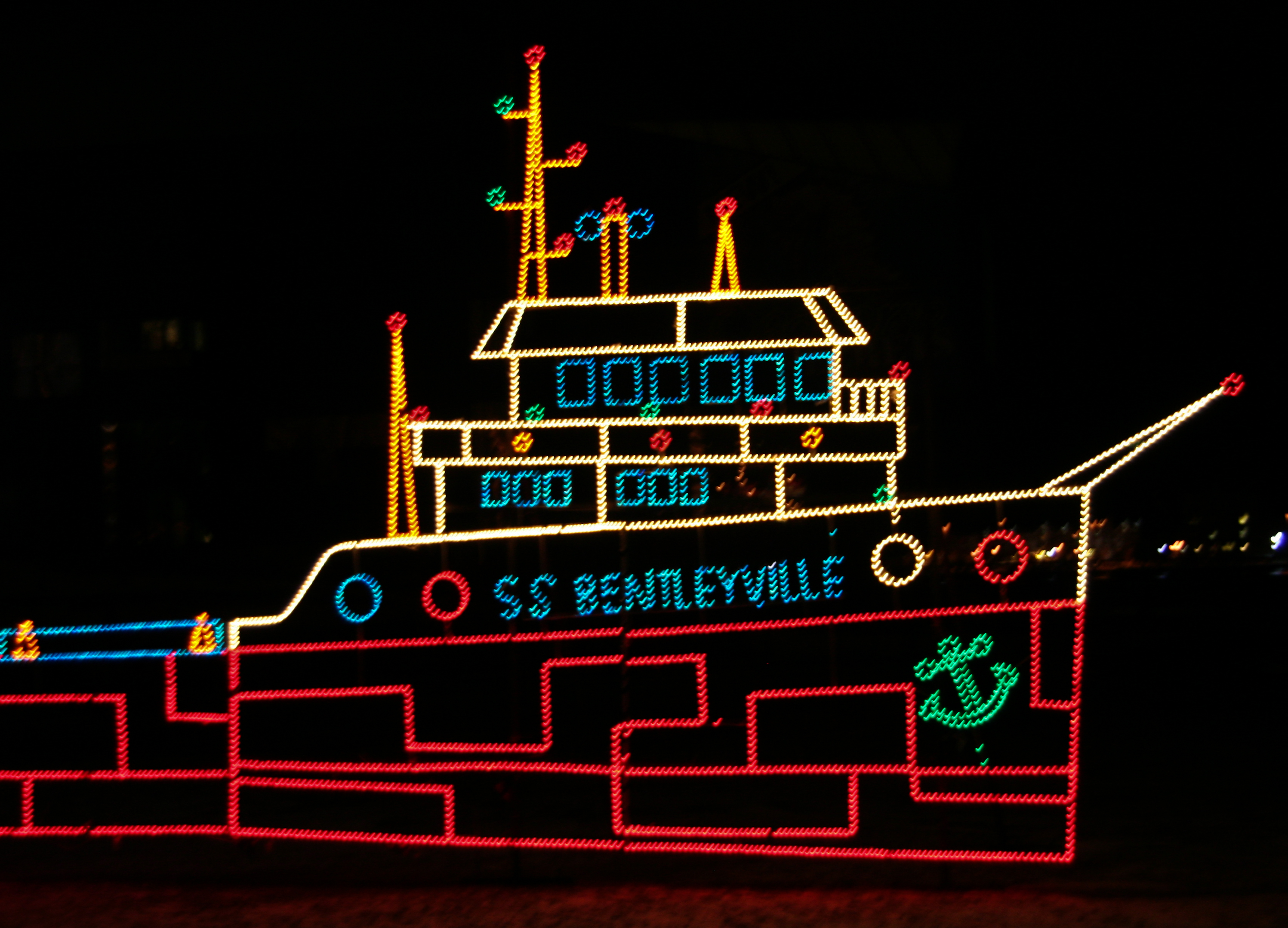
Lake Superior freighter
