= 1970 Minnesota lieutenant gubernatorial election =

- November 3, 1970
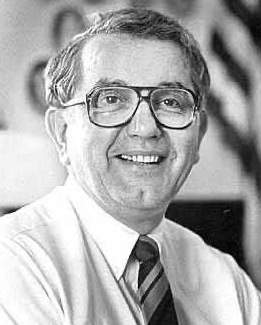

Nominee	Rudy Perpich	Ben Boo
Party	Democratic (DFL)	Republican
Popular vote	671,749	654,486
Percentage	50.65%	49.35%
- County results Perpich: 50–60% 60–70% 70–80% Boo: 50–60% 60–70%
Lieutenant Governor before election
James B. Goetz
Republican
Elected Lieutenant Governor
Rudy Perpich
Democratic (DFL)

The 1970 Minnesota lieutenant gubernatorial election took place on November 3, 1970. State Senator Rudy Perpich of the Minnesota Democratic-Farmer-Labor Party defeated Duluth Mayor Ben Boo of the Republican Party of Minnesota. The 1970 lieutenant gubernatorial election was the final lieutenant gubernatorial election held before the Minnesota Constitution was amended to provide for elections of the Governor and Lieutenant Governor on a joint ticket.

== Results ==
1970 Lieutenant Gubernatorial Election, Minnesota
Party	Candidate	Votes	%	±%
Democratic (DFL)	Rudy Perpich	671,749	50.65%	+1.72%
Republican	Ben Boo	654,486	49.35%	−1.72%
Majority		17,263	1.30%	
Turnout		1,326,235		
Democratic (DFL) gain from Republican		Swing		
