= Doty =

Doty may refer to:

== Places in the United States ==
- Doty, Michigan
- Doty, Nebraska
- Doty, Washington
- Doty, Wisconsin
- Doty County, Minnesota, a former name of St. Louis County
- Doty Island, Wisconsin

== Other uses ==
- Doty (surname)
- 9721 Doty, a minor planet
- SS L.R. Doty, a steamship that sank in Lake Superior in 1898

== See also ==
- Dotyville, Wisconsin, an unincorporated community
