= Doughty =

Doughty is an English and Scottish surname. Notable people with the surname include:

- Al Doughty (born 1966), British musician and bassist
- Alfie Doughty (born 1999), English footballer
- Andrew Doughty (1916–2013), British anaesthetist
- Anthony Doughty (born 1963), British musician
- Arthur Doughty (1860–1936), Canadian civil servant
- Brandon Doughty (born 1991), American football player
- C. N. Doughty (1867–1915), American artist (Joseph John Englehart)
- Caitlin Doughty (born 1984), American mortician and death-positivity advocate
- Cecil Langley Doughty (1913–1985), British comics artist and illustrator
- Charles Doughty (politician) (1902–1973), British Conservative Party politician
- Charles Montagu Doughty (1843–1926), English poet, writer, and traveller
- Charles Doughty-Wylie (1868–1915), British army officer, nephew of the above
- David Doughty (born 1937), English cricketer
- Drew Doughty (born 1989), Canadian professional ice hockey player
- Eugenia Doughty (1874–1934), second wife of Sir George Doughty
- Eva Craig Graves Doughty (1852–?), American journalist
- George Doughty (politician) (1854–1914), British ship-owner and politician
- Glenn Doughty (born 1951), American football player
- Henry Montagu Doughty (1870–1921), British naval officer
- Jack Doughty (1865–1937), Welsh footballer
- John Doughty (1754–1826), American militia general
- Kenny Doughty (born 1975), British actor
- Lewis Doughty (born 1990), English squash player
- Louise Doughty (born 1963), English novelist, playwright and journalist
- Matt Doughty (born 1981), English footballer
- Michael Doughty (Australian footballer) (born 1979), Australian rules footballer
- Mike Doughty (born 1970), American singer and songwriter
- Mike Doughty (co-driver) (1936–2025), Kenyan rally co-driver
- Neal Doughty (born 1946), American keyboard player, founding member of REO Speedwagon
- Nigel Doughty (1957–2012), British investor, chairman of Doughty Hanson & Co
- Patrick K. Doughty, American sports announcer
- Phil Doughty (born 1986), English footballer
- Reed Doughty (born 1982), American football strong safety
- Roger Doughty (1868–1914), Welsh footballer
- Ross E. Doughty (1910–2000), Justice of the Supreme Court of Texas
- Stephen Doughty (born 1980), Welsh Labour Co-op Member of Parliament for Cardiff South and Penarth
- Sue Doughty (born 1948), British politician, MP for Guildford 2001–2005
- Thomas Doughty (artist) (1793–1856), American artist
- Thomas Doughty (explorer) (1545–1578), English nobleman, soldier, and scholar
- William Doughty (naval architect) (1773–1859), United States naval architect
- William Doughty (painter) (1757–1782), British painter

== See also ==
- Doughty Street
- Dowty (disambiguation)
