= Dowty =

Dowty may refer to:

- Dowty Group, a British aircraft equipment manufacturing business

== People with the surname ==
- Alan Dowty, international relations scholar
- David Dowty, American linguist
- George Dowty, British inventor and businessman

== See also ==
- Doughty, a surname
- Dowty Propellers, a British company specialising in aircraft propellers
- Messier-Dowty, originally a landing gear joint venture between Snecma and Dowty
