= Jennifer Schultz =

American politician

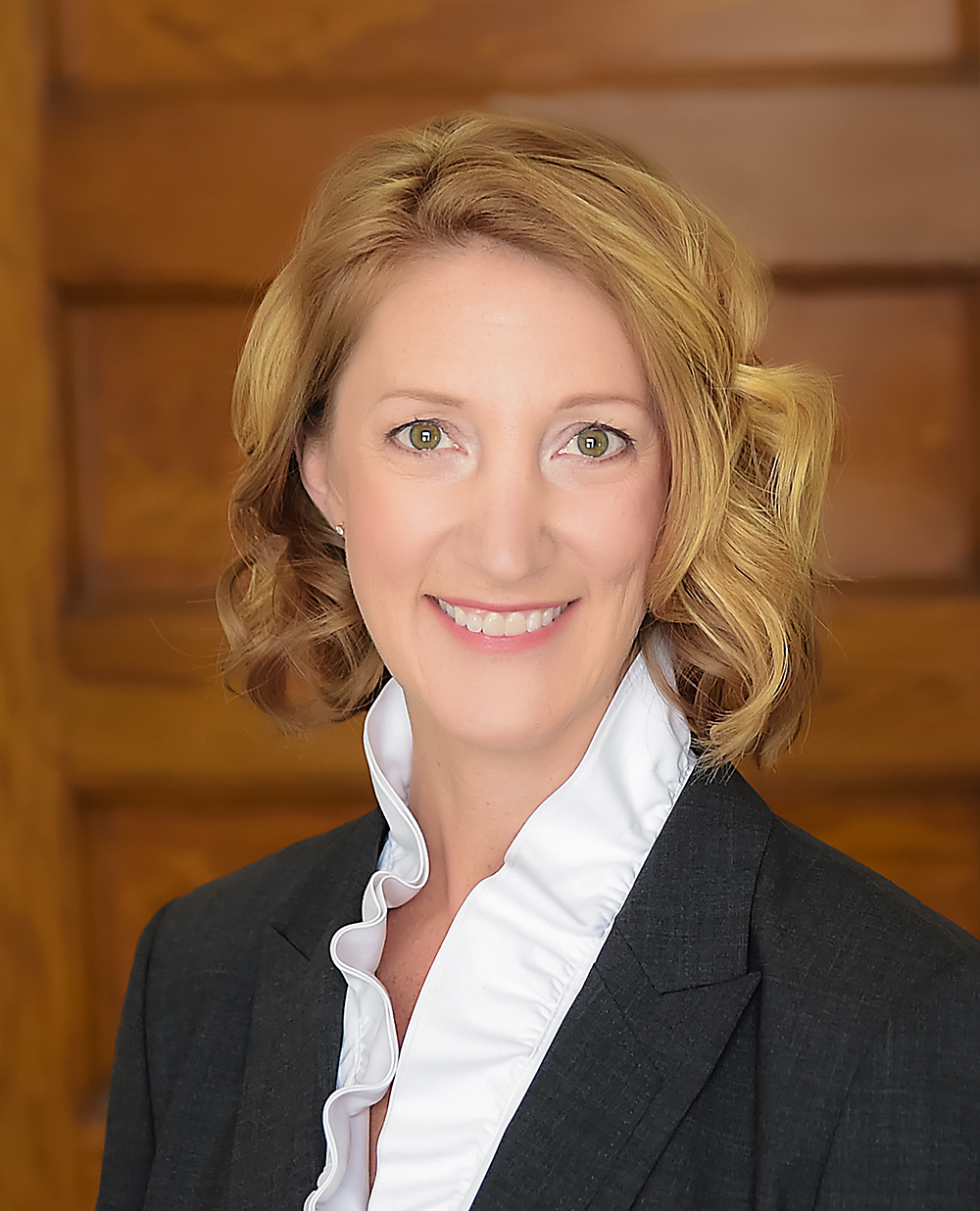

Member of the Minnesota House of Representatives from the 7A district
- In office January 6, 2015 – January 2, 2023
- Preceded by: Tom Huntley
- Succeeded by: Liish Kozlowski

Personal details
- Party: Democratic
- Children: 2
- Education: University of Minnesota (PhD)
- Website: Campaign website

Jennifer Schultz is an American politician and former member of the Minnesota House of Representatives. A member of the Minnesota Democratic–Farmer–Labor Party (DFL), she represented District 7A in northeastern Minnesota. She unsuccessfully ran for U.S. Congress in Minnesota's 8th Congressional District in 2022, and again 2024.

== Early life and education ==
Schultz was raised in Chippewa Falls, Wisconsin. She attended the University of Minnesota, graduating with a Ph.D. in health services research, policy, and administration, with a concentration in health economics.

== Personal life ==
Schultz is married with two children and resides in Duluth, Minnesota. She is a professor of health care economics at the University of Minnesota Duluth.

== Congressional campaign ==
On March 28, 2022, Schultz announced that she was running for Congress in Minnesota's 8th congressional district. She won the August 9 DFL primary with 86.15% of the vote, and lost the November 8 general election. She ran again in 2024.

Minnesota House of Representatives
Preceded by Tom Huntley	Member of the Minnesota House of Representatives from the 7A district 2015–2023	Succeeded by Alicia Kozlowski; Redistricted
