= Sister Mary Olivia Gowan =

American nurse and nun (1888–1977)

Mary Olivia Gowan (1888–1977) was an American nurse and Benedictine nun known for founding the nursing school at the Catholic University of America.

== Biography ==
Mary Olivia Gowan was born on March 15, 1888, in Stillwater, Minnesota to William and Margaret Lawler. She expressed an interest in nursing from a young age and in 1912 would graduate from St. Mary's School of Nursing in Duluth, Minnesota. After graduating there, she went on to get a bachelor's degree in nursing at the College of St. Scholastica and a masters at Teachers College, Columbia University. While a student of sociology at the Catholic University of America, she worked with James Hugh Ryan to establish the university's nursing school in 1932, and in 1935 she would be appointed as dean of the school. After the Second World War, Gowan was cited by the American Red Cross for her service as an advisor and consultant to the medical division of the United States Department of the Navy and the Veterans Administration. She also served as president of the Association of Collegiate Nursing from 1940 to 1944. She retired in 1957 back to the College of St. Scholastica, where she died on April 2, 1977, at the age of 89.
