= Great Lakes Aquarium =

Public aquarium in Duluth, Minnesota, United States

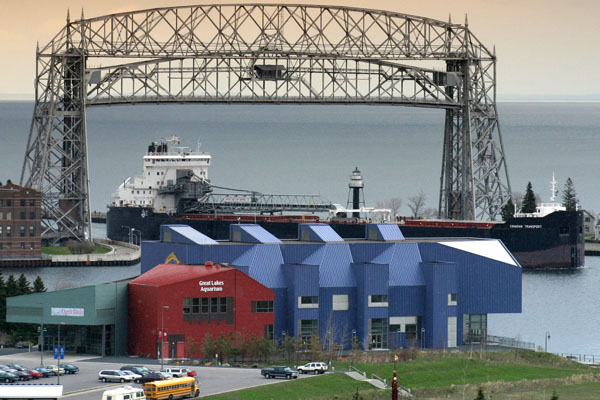
- Great Lakes Aquarium in Duluth, MN
- Interactive map of Great Lakes Aquarium
- 46°46′45.36″N 92°6′1″W
- Date opened: July 29, 2000
- Location: Duluth, Minnesota, USA
- Floor space: 62,000 sq ft (5,800 m^{2})
- No. of animals: 1500
- No. of species: 250
- Volume of largest tank: 85,000 US gal (320,000 L)
- Total volume of tanks: 175,000 US gal (660,000 L)
- Website: www.glaquarium.org

Great Lakes Aquarium is an aquarium in Duluth, Minnesota. The aquarium opened in 2000 and is located on the waterfront of the Duluth harbor, next to Lake Superior. A 501(c)(3) private nonprofit, Great Lakes Aquarium features animals and habitats found within the Great Lakes basin and other worldwide ecosystems such as the Amazon River or Pacific reefs. The aquarium houses 205 different species of fish, birds, reptiles, amphibians, and mammals. It is one of few aquariums in the United States that focuses predominantly on freshwater exhibits.

Many of the main exhibits at 62,000-square-foot (5,800 m^{2}) Great Lakes Aquarium (GLA) are based upon actual habitats in the Lake Superior basin. "Slices" of the Saint Louis River, Baptism River, Pictured Rocks National Lakeshore, Kakagon Slough, Isle Royale and Otter Cove can all be viewed up close.

== History ==
Great Lakes Aquarium opened its doors on July 29, 2000. It was built (on land donated by Duluth philanthropists Julia and Caroline Marshall) with a combination of state and local funds as well more than $6 million in private donations. While well attended in those opening months, construction delays resulted in a loss of around 30% of anticipated revenues that year. In 2002, Mayor Gary Doty appointed a task force to improve the facility's long-term viability. Later that year the city took over managerial control of the Aquarium and briefly closed it.

In May 2003, management of Great Lakes Aquarium was turned over to Ripley's Entertainment, Leisure Entertainment Corporation, best known for its "Believe it or Not" museums. The company eliminated 2/3 of aquarium staff and cut costs, bringing it back from the immediate threat of permanent closure. Under successive declining years of attendance, Ripley's ended its relationship with the Aquarium in 2007.

At that time, the board of directors decided to return management of the facility back to local control and recruited Jack LaVoy to serve as executive director. Since 2008, a philosophy of continuous improvement has been adopted starting with a program called "The Three R's"; repair, replace or remove all defective exhibits from the exhibit floor. Plans for new exhibit galleries and expanded educational outreach are ongoing. GLA is a not-for-profit 501(c)3 organization.

== Architecture ==
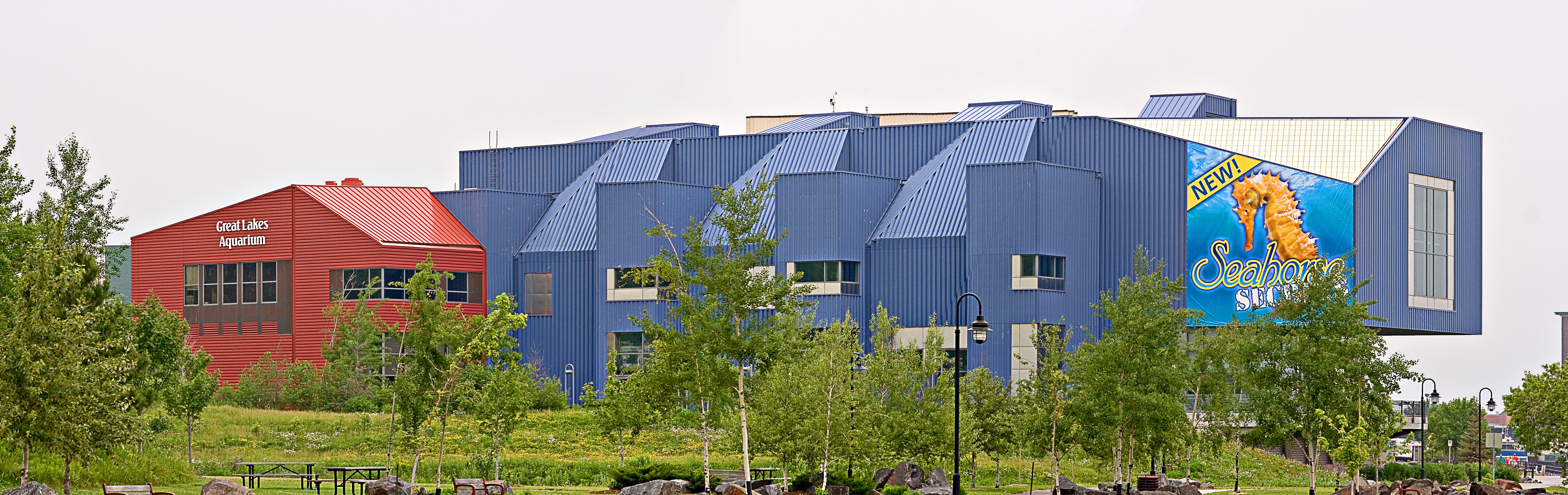
The aquarium as seen from Bayfront Festival Park.

Construction took 3.5 years and cost around $34 million. An office area at the rear of the first floor has been cleared out to host conferences, birthday parties and other pre-arranged events. There are harbor views from this area and other parts of the museum. When visitors enter the museum, they are encouraged to ride the escalator to the upper level first through Sensory Immersion Experience and continue onto the lower level later.
