= Herb Bergson =

American politician (1956–2022)

38th Mayor of Duluth
- In office January 5, 2004 – January 7, 2008
- Preceded by: Gary Doty
- Succeeded by: Don Ness

Personal details
- Born: September 18, 1956
- Died: February 10, 2022 (aged 65)
- Party: Democratic-Farmer-Labor

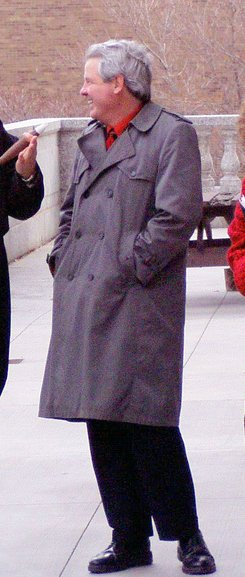
Bergson at an anti-poverty rally, 2005

Herbert William Bergson (September 16, 1956 – February 10, 2022) was an American politician who was the mayor of Duluth, Minnesota, and Superior, Wisconsin, the only person to have served as mayor in both cities.

Bergson was elected mayor of Duluth in 2003, taking a two-way race with 57 percent of the vote over local businessman Charlie Bell. He succeeded Gary Doty, who retired from the office after serving three terms. Bergson lost his bid for re-election in a crowded 12-candidate primary in September 2007. He had run unsuccessfully for the office in 1999. He served on the Duluth City Council from 2001 until his election as mayor.

From 1987 to 1995, Bergson was the mayor of Superior, Wisconsin, Duluth's Twin Ports sister city across Lake Superior. He had been a police patrolman when he unseated the incumbent mayor. After leaving office, Bergson returned to active duty as a police detective in Superior.

In December 2005, Bergson pleaded no contest to a drunk driving charge after crashing a vehicle into a bridge near Spooner, Wisconsin and suffering a concussion and other injuries. At a Duluth City Hall news conference several days later, Bergson said, "I have no desire to drink alcohol. I've decided that I'll never drink again". In May 2012, Bergson was arrested for operating a motor vehicle while intoxicated. He was arrested in September 2013, resulting in four charges, including drunk driving and driving with an open container. In February 2018, Bergson was arrested after crashing his car into a tree in Douglas County, Wisconsin and leaving the scene. He was charged with obstructing an officer and failure to install an ignition interlock device, which is related to previous convictions for driving under the influence.

Bergson died from complications of surgery on February 10, 2022, at the age of 65.

== See also ==
- List of mayors of Duluth, Minnesota
