= Robert Senkler =

Robert Senkler is the former chairman of Securian Financial Group. He was CEO from 1994-2014. Senkler started with Minnesota Life - Securian Financial Group as an actuarial trainee in 1974, and worked his way up to vice president in 1984. He is on the boards of HealthEast Care System and Hubbard Broadcasting. In 2001 Senkler was awarded the BestPrep Humanitarian Award, and in 2003 he was inducted into the University of Minnesota Duluth Academy of Science and Engineering. Senkler graduated from the University of Minnesota Duluth in 1974 with a degree in mathematics.
