= David Doughty =

English cricketer

Personal information
- Full name: David George Doughty
- Born: 9 November 1937; Chiswick, Middlesex, England
- Died: 2024
- Batting: Left-handed
- Bowling: Slow left-arm orthodox
- Role: Bowler

Domestic team information
- Years: Team
- 1963–1964: Somerset
- FC debut: 11 May 1963 Somerset v Essex
- Last FC: 8 May 1964 Somerset v Australians
- Only LA: 22 May 1963 Somerset v Glamorgan

Career statistics
Competition	First-class	List A
Matches	17	1
Runs scored	104	20
Batting average	6.93	20.00
100s/50s	0/0	0/0
Top score	22	20
Balls bowled	1,357	42
Wickets	35	1
Bowling average	20.28	31.00
5 wickets in innings	2	0
10 wickets in match	1	0
Best bowling	6/58	1/31
Catches/stumpings	6/–	0/–
- Source: CricketArchive, 24 December 2009

David George Doughty (9 November 1937 – 2024) was an English cricketer. He played first-class cricket for Somerset in 17 matches in the 1963 and 1964 seasons. He also appeared in one one-day match in the Gillette Cup.

== Biography ==
Doughty was born in November 1937 at Chiswick, Middlesex. A slow left-arm orthodox spin bowler and lower-order left-handed batsman, he played second eleven cricket for Middlesex, Surrey and Leicestershire between 1959 and 1961, often batting quite high in the order. But it was as a left-arm spinner that he was recommended to Somerset by Arthur Wellard. He played in 16 first-class matches for the county in the successful 1963 season, when Somerset finished third in the County Championship, equalling their highest-ever placing to that point.

In those 16 matches, Doughty took 35 wickets at the low average of 18.14 runs per wicket. His most successful match came against Derbyshire at Weston-super-Mare when he took six wickets for 58 runs in the first innings and five for 44 in the second for match figures of 11 for 102. These were the only occasions when he took five wickets in an innings, and he had lost his place in the team by the end of the season. In 1964, he made only a single first-class appearance, and though it brought his highest first-class score, 22, it did not bring any wickets, and he did not play first-class cricket again.

Doughty's single List A appearance produced a curiosity. Playing in Somerset's first-ever one-day match in the inaugural Gillette Cup against Glamorgan in 1963, he took one wicket and then went in to bat at No 10 with Somerset at 121 for eight, chasing a total of 207. Doughty scored 20 and put on 75 for the ninth wicket with Brian Langford, who made 56. In the end Glamorgan won by 10 runs. In 2009, the stand was still Somerset's ninth-wicket List A cricket record and the oldest surviving List A record.
