= Tom Huntley =

American politician (1938–2025)

Member of the Minnesota House of Representatives from the 7A district 6B (1993–2003)
- In office January 5, 1993 – January 5, 2015
- Preceded by: redrawn district
- Succeeded by: Jennifer Schultz

Personal details
- Born: February 10, 1938
- Died: December 22, 2025 (aged 87)
- Party: Minnesota Democratic–Farmer–Labor Party
- Spouse: Gail
- Children: 2
- Education: University of Minnesota; Iowa State University
- Occupation: Legislator

Thomas E. Huntley (February 10, 1938 – December 22, 2025) was an American politician and member of the Minnesota House of Representatives. A member of the Minnesota Democratic–Farmer–Labor Party (DFL), he represented District 7A, which includes portions of the city of Duluth in St. Louis County in the northeastern part of the state. He is a retired associate professor of biochemistry and molecular biology at the University of Minnesota Duluth and former director of Institutional Relations at the University's School of Medicine.

== Early life, education, and career ==
Huntley graduated from Cretin High School in Saint Paul, and attended the University of Minnesota, receiving his B.S. in chemistry in 1960. He earned his Ph.D. in biochemistry from the University of Iowa in Iowa City in 1970.

Prior to being elected to the legislature, Huntley was active in Twin Ports area government. He served on the Minnesota Great Lakes Commission, on the Duluth City Council (1984–1988), and as a commissioner on the Minnesota Seaway Port Authority of Duluth (1988–1993). He was also the president of the Seaway Port Authority from 1990-1992.

== Minnesota House of Representatives ==
Huntley was first elected to the Minnesota legislature in 1992. He was the chair of the Finance Subcommittee for the Health Care and Human Services Finance Division from 2007 to 2010. He was a member of the Governor's Joint Health Care Task Force, of the Legislative Commission on Health Care Access, and of the Task Force on Small Business Health Insurance. He announced on December 17, 2013 that he would not be seeking re-election in 2014.

== Personal life and life ==
His wife, Gail Huntley (nee Wettels), is a former DFL Party activist and state associate chair.

Huntley was arrested on February 2, 2013, near Deerwood, Minnesota, on suspicion of driving under the influence of alcohol after being stopped for speeding. He subsequently announced that he was guilty of the charge, intended to plead guilty, and apologized to constituents for his actions.

Huntley died on December 22, 2025, at the age of 87.
