= Stephen R. Doty =

American mathematician

Stephen Richard Doty
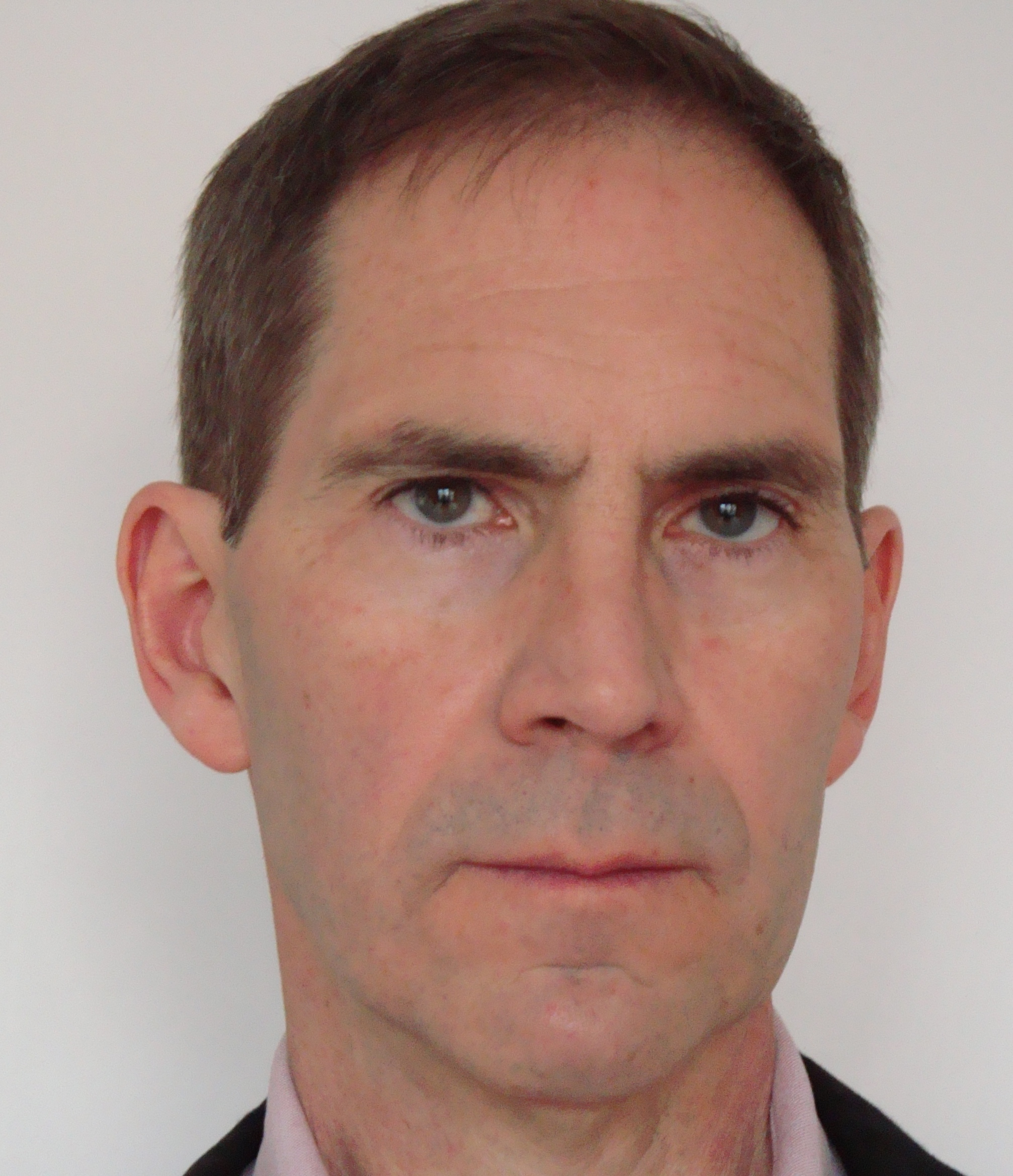
- Born: 16 April 1953 (age 73); Salt Lake City, Utah, US
- Education: University of Notre Dame
- Scientific career
- Fields: Mathematics
- Doctoral advisor: Warren Wong

Stephen Richard Doty (born April 16, 1953) is an American mathematician specializing in algebraic representation theory (especially modular representation theory). He earned a doctorate in mathematics from University of Notre Dame in 1982 under the supervision of Warren J. Wong with dissertation The Submodule Structure of Weyl Modules for Groups of Type A_{n}. After post-doctoral positions at University of Washington and University of Notre Dame, he joined the faculty at Loyola University Chicago in 1987.

In 2007 Doty was named the Inaugural Yip Fellow of Magdalene College, Cambridge University. In 2009 he was a Mercator Professor in Germany.

== Selected publications ==
- Doty, Stephen (1989), "The strong linkage principle", American Journal of Mathematics, 111 (1): 135–141, doi:10.2307/2374483, JSTOR 2374483, MR 0980303
- Doty, Stephen (1999), "Representation theory of reductive normal algebraic monoids", Transactions of the American Mathematical Society, 351 (6): 2539–2551, doi:10.1090/S0002-9947-99-02462-9, MR 1653351
- Doty, Stephen; Giaquinto, Anthony (2002), "Presenting Schur algebras", International Mathematics Research Notices, 2002 (36): 1907–1944, doi:10.1155/S1073792802201026, MR 1920169, S2CID 2017942
- Doty, Stephen (2003), "Presenting generalized q-Schur algebras", Representation Theory, 7 (9): 196–213, arXiv:math/0305208, doi:10.1090/S1088-4165-03-00176-6, MR 1990659, S2CID 16028303
