= John Fedo =

American politician

36th Mayor of Duluth
- In office 1979–1992
- Preceded by: Robert Beaudin
- Succeeded by: Gary Doty

Personal details
- Born: 1950 (age 75–76) Duluth, Minnesota
- Party: Democratic-Farmer-Labor
- Spouse: Lory
- Profession: Development Consultant / Developer

John Fedo (born 1950) is an American politician from Duluth, Minnesota, and a former mayor of that city. Prior to becoming the City's youngest mayor, he served on the Duluth City Council during the 1970s and owned a gas station in Duluth.

As mayor, Fedo is widely credited with launching the renaissance of Duluth's lakefront and the development of Canal Park in the 1980s. He was also active in the design and beautification of downtown Duluth.

In March 1988, Fedo was indicted on state charges of theft and falsification of records. After a trial, Fedo was acquitted on all counts, and served out his third term before retiring as mayor in January 1992.

After he retired as mayor of Duluth, Fedo became City Administrator (1992–1995) in Hibbing, Minnesota. In 1994 Fedo founded John A Fedo and Associates, an economic development consulting firm. In 2011 the firm merged with JPJ Engineering and Development. Fedo is a partner.

== See also ==
- List of mayors of Duluth, Minnesota
