= Don Ness =

American politician (born 1974)

39th Mayor of Duluth
- In office January 7, 2008 – January 4, 2016
- Preceded by: Herb Bergson
- Succeeded by: Emily Larson

Personal details
- Born: January 9, 1974 (age 52) Duluth, Minnesota, U.S.
- Party: Democratic (DFL)
- Spouse: Laura Ness
- Education: University of Minnesota Duluth (BBA); College of St. Scholastica (MBA)

Don Ness (born January 9, 1974) is an American politician who served as the 38th mayor of Duluth, Minnesota from 2008 to 2016. He is a member of the Minnesota Democratic-Farmer-Labor Party.

== Early life and education ==
Ness was born in Duluth to Don and Mary Ness. His father was the pastor of a small, non-denominational Christian church, who also was chaplain at Northwoods Children's Services. Ness was educated in Duluth's public school system, attending Central High School before earning a Bachelor's Degree in Management Information Sciences from University of Minnesota Duluth, where he was given the Sieur du Lhut Award for his service to the campus. He later earned an MBA degree from the College of St. Scholastica.

== Career ==
Ness has a history of active service to and involvement in the Duluth community. He founded the Bridge Syndicate, a group of young people whose mission is to increase civic, cultural, and economic opportunities in the Twin Ports. Ness was also festival director of the Homegrown Music Festival for two years.

Ness also worked for the Zeppa Family Foundation, a progressive foundation focused on hunger and poverty, environmental sustainability, and support for the visual and performing arts in 2007.

In 1997, Congressman Jim Oberstar hired Ness to be his campaign manager, a position Ness held for nearly ten years.

In the fall of 1999, Ness was elected to the Duluth City Council as the city's councilor-at-large. In 2001 and 2004, he served as council president.

=== Mayor of Duluth ===
Ness was elected Mayor of Duluth in November 2007 from a pool of 12 candidates. He was inaugurated for his first term on January 7, 2008, at a ceremony held at the Duluth Entertainment Convention Center.

Elected at age 33, Ness is often referred to as the youngest Mayor to take office in Duluth, though John Fedo was 29 when he was elected in 1979.

Ness ran for a second term unopposed in 2011. He held an 89% approval rating in 2014 and was the first Mayor to run without a challenger since Duluth was incorporated in 1887.

Since Ness took office in 2008, Duluth has overcome several challenges. The first resolution was to balance the growing $4.4 million budget deficit.

In 2008, Ness addressed the problem of runaway retiree healthcare costs by moving retired City employees to a plan that matched those of current employees. Eligible retirees were moved to Medicare. Previously, retirees were able to keep the plan in effect upon retirement. This adjustment reduced Duluth's unfunded healthcare liability by $209 million in 2013. Labor unions took the city to the state Supreme Court over the issue but were unsuccessful. Through hard work and making other difficult and unpopular decisions, Duluth's general fund increased from a negative balance of $1.3 million in 2008 to a $7.53 million reserve in 2011. Two years after election, the national recession resulted in a cut of annual state aid by $5.2 million in 2010.

In 2009, the federal government and United States Environmental Protection Agency mandated that Duluth make improvements to the city's sewer system, which was estimated to cost $130 million. According to the EPA, there were 250 sanitary sewer overflows between 1999 and 2004. Duluth embraced the challenge to eliminate sanitary sewer overflow by 2016. The project was completed in 2013.

==== Economic issues ====
Duluth has one of the fastest growing economies in America. In September, 2014, city leaders announced a 4.3% unemployment rate, which is the lowest it had been since 2006.

Standard & Poor's Ratings Services assigned Duluth's GO Bond rating to AA in 2014 as compared to AA− in 2008 and Moody's reported an Aa2 rating in 2014.

Duluth has also been referred to as an "aviation hub", with companies like AAR Corp and Cirrus Aircraft contributing to the city's economy.

==== St. Louis River corridor ====
Since 1987, the Saint Louis River has been listed as an area of concern by the EPA due to many years of pollution from industrial and landfill sites. The cleanup began in 1978 before it was listed as an AOC with the installation of a waste-water treatment plant.

In 2009, Ness organized a St. Louis River Corridor Summit and brought over 70 stakeholders together to develop a comprehensive vision for the area. It will see another $300–400 million in additional federal, state, and private money to continue the restoration progress. Ness' vision for the St. Louis River Corridor is to maintain the cleanliness of the river and have it delisted as an AOC with the EPA by 2025.

In 2014, Ness secured state authorization to re-establish a half percent tax on lodging and half percent on food and beverages tax. These funds would be dedicated to developing the corridor into an outdoor adventure destination.

Improvements to the area include a rehabilitation of Grand Avenue by adding in more sidewalks, bike lanes, and connections to nearby bike trails. The city and volunteers through COGGS are working to complete a 100-mile single track bike trail called the Duluth Traverse that will connect to trails in the corridor. A city-subsidized chalet at Spirit Mountain connects the ski hill to Grand Avenue. The city is also working to improve access points to the river for paddlers.

== Personal life ==
Ness and his wife, Laura, met in 2002 when she was a field staffer for Paul Wellstone. They were married in 2004, and have three children. Active in community organizations, Laura Ness has run for county commissioner, and had prominent roles on two election campaigns. Laura was owner of Vintage Duluth, a vintage clothing store. She was also co-owner of Green Home Solutions of Duluth, a mold remediation and air quality company.

== Books ==
- Ness, Don (2015). Hillsider: Snapshots of a Curious Political Journey. Hillside Publishing. p. 304. ISBN 978-0-6924-9012-9.
- Donn Larson; Don Ness, eds. (2018). The Will and The Way Volume II: Community Leadership Stories from Duluth, MN. ISBN 978-0-6921-7177-6.
