= Emily Larson =

American politician

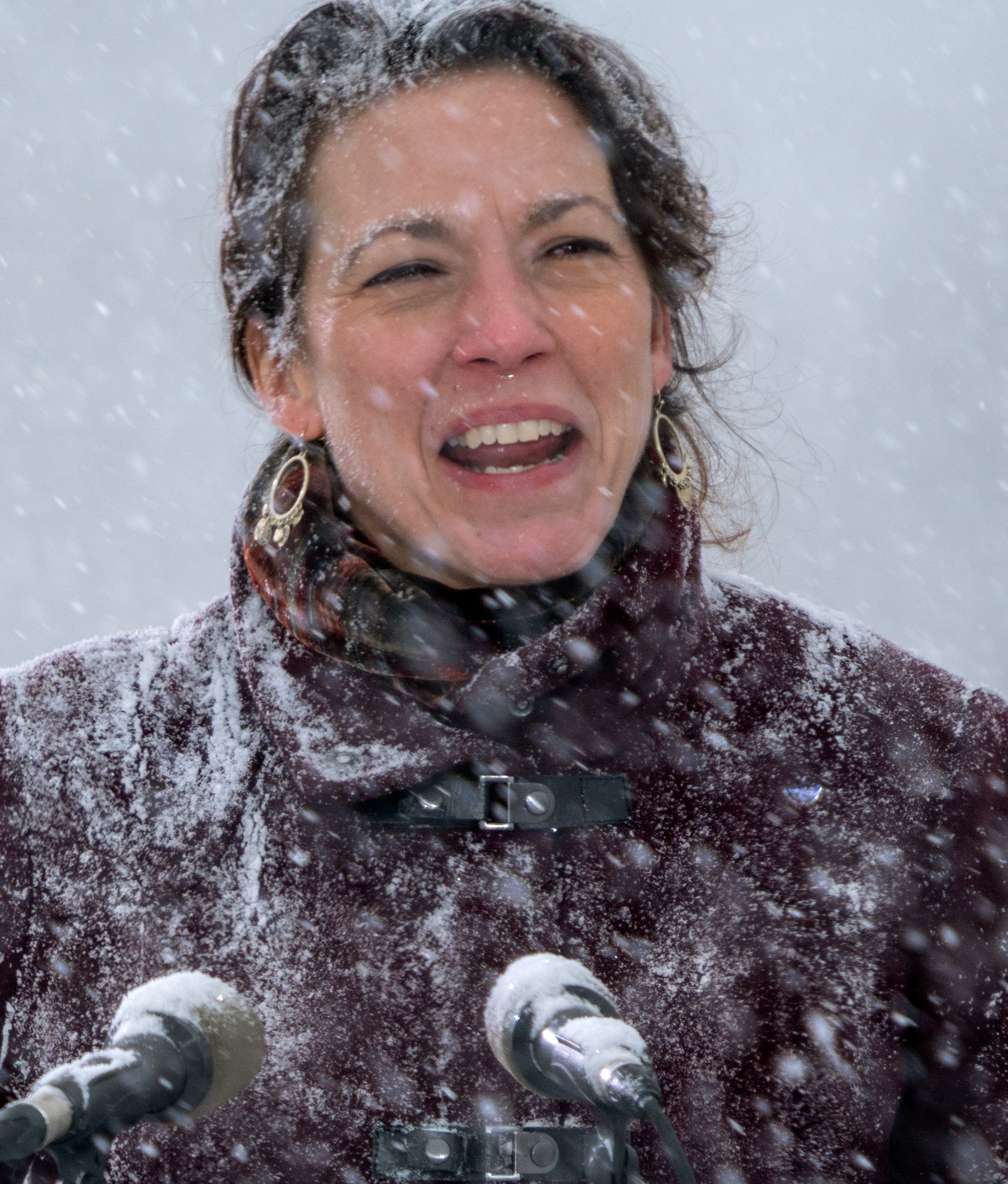
- Larson in 2019

40th Mayor of Duluth
- In office January 4, 2016 – January 2, 2024
- Preceded by: Don Ness
- Succeeded by: Roger Reinert

Member of the Duluth City Council
- In office January 2, 2012 – January 4, 2016
- Preceded by: Jeff Anderson
- Succeeded by: Elissa Hansen

Personal details
- Born: 1973 (age 52–53) St. Paul, Minnesota, U.S.
- Party: Democratic (DFL)
- Spouse: Doug Zaun
- Education: College of St. Scholastica (BA); University of Minnesota (MSW)

Emily Larson (born 1973) is an American politician and former mayor of Duluth, Minnesota. She is a member of the Minnesota Democratic-Farmer-Labor Party.

Larson was elected mayor of Duluth in November 2015 and inaugurated on January 4, 2016, the first female mayor in the city's history. She won reelection in 2019, but in her run for a third term in 2023, she was defeated. Prior to becoming mayor, she was a member of the Duluth City Council.

== Life and education ==
Emily Larson was born and raised in St. Paul, the youngest of three children. Her mother, a poet, and her father, an information technology worker, divorced when she was 10 years old, but both later remarried. She graduated with a Bachelor's Degree in social work from the College of St. Scholastica and later earned a Master's Degree from the University of Minnesota-Duluth. A graduate of the Intermedia Arts Creative Community Leadership Institute, Larson served on the advisory committee that developed the Duluth Energy Efficiency Program (DEEP).

She has worked in Duluth for CHUM, a charity assisting homeless people and people at high risk for homelessness, and as a consultant to other non-profit organizations. She owns a small business that specializes in helping non-profits.

== Political career ==
Larson finished first in the 2011 election for an at-large city council position, and was elected president of the Duluth City Council. She served for one term until she was elected mayor of the city.

=== Mayor of Duluth ===
In November 2015, Larson won election as the first female mayor of Duluth, with almost 72% of the total votes. She succeeded popular mayor Don Ness, who in his second term held a nearly 90% approval rating. Larson was inaugurated on January 4, 2016, during a ceremony at the Duluth Entertainment Convention Center (DECC).

In 2018, Larson advocated for a new city flag, claiming it would make a strong brand for the city and represent the "city to its people and its people to the world at large." The Flag of Duluth was approved by the city council in 2019.

She was again reelected in November 2019, this time with about 64% of the total votes. She led the city during the COVID-19 pandemic and concurrent lockdowns, business restrictions and closures, workplace hazard controls, mask mandates, quarantines, and testing systems that all occurred on the local level.

In December 2022, Larson announced her reelection bid, making her the first Duluth mayor to run for a third term since Gary Doty in 1999.

During the November 7th, 2023 elections Larson lost her re-election bid 60-40 percent to Roger Reinert.

== Personal life ==
She is married to Doug Zaun, co-owner of Duluth-based design firm Wagner Zaun Architecture, and together they have two sons.

Larson is an active trail runner and fitness enthusiast.

== Electoral history ==
2011 Duluth City Councilor At-Large election
Candidates	Primary (Sep 13)		General election (Nov 8)	
	Votes^{A}	%	Votes^{A}	%
Emily Larson	4,918	40.12	13,216	38.96
Linda Krug	4,860	39.65	12,186	35.92
Tim Riley	947	7.73	4,459	13.14
Chad Smith	645	5.26	3,920	11.56
Eric Edwardson	446	3.64		
Gareth W. Bates	442	3.61		
Write-in			142	0.42
Total	12,258	100	33,923	100

^AVoters could cast up to two votes

2015 Duluth Mayoral Election
Candidates	Primary (Sep 15)		General election (Nov 3)	
	Votes	%	Votes	%
Emily Larson	5,456	67.32	15,352	71.94
Chuck Horton	1,505	18.57	5,862	27.47
Howie Hanson	732	9.03		
James Mattson	117	2.18		
John Socha	111	1.37		
John Howard Evans	51	0.63		
Thomas Cooper	45	0.56		
Robert D. Schieve	27	0.33		
Write-in			125	0.59
Total	8,044	100	21,339	100

2019 Duluth Mayoral Election
Candidates	Primary (Aug 13)		General election (Nov 5)	
	Votes	%	Votes	%
Emily Larson	5,225	66.87	13,340	63.65
David Nolle	992	12.70	7,509	35.83
John Socha	450	5.76		
Daniel Weatherly	285	3.65		
Donald Raihala	220	2.82		
Caleb Anderson	206	2.64		
Jesse Peterson	193	2.47		
Corey Ford	160	2.05		
Doris Queen Lavender	83	1.06		
Write-in			110	0.52
Total	7,814	100	20,959	100

== See also ==
- List of mayors of Duluth, Minnesota
