= Securian Financial Group =

American financial company

Securian Financial Group, Inc.
- Former logo of Securian Financial Group (1998–2018)
- Formerly: Minnesota Mutual Life Insurance Company, Minnesota Life Insurance Company
- Company type: Private
- Industry: Financial services
- Founded: August 6, 1880; 145 years ago St. Paul, Minnesota, U.S.
- Founder: Russell Dorr
- Headquarters: St. Paul, Minnesota, United States
- Area served: United States and Canada
- Key people: Christopher M. Hilger (President and CEO)
- Products: Insurance; Annuities; Retirement; Wealth management
- AUM: $78.6 billion (USD)
- Number of employees: 5,000 (2017)
- Website: www.securian.com

Securian Financial Group is an American financial service group that provides a range of financial products and services such as insurance and investments. It is structured as a mutual holding company that operates a number of subsidiaries.

As of 2018, Securian Financial provided insurance, investment retirement products and trust services to more than 19 million clients in the United States, Puerto Rico and Canada.

== History ==
The company was founded in St. Paul, Minnesota, by Russell Dorr on August 6, 1880.

Robert Senkler was the CEO from 1994 to 2014. After Senkler, Chris Hilger became the chairman, president and CEO.

By 2018, the company managed $78.6 billion in assets and had nearly $1.2 trillion in insurance in force.

== Corporate Organization ==
Minnesota Mutual Companies, Inc. is the parent holding company headquartered in St. Paul, MN with a mutual ownership model that operates under the name "Securian Financial". It is the parent of Securian Financial Group, Inc. (which is technically a stock subsidiary, but is not publicly owned or traded), as well as several other companies that provide a broad range of financial services, including:

- Minnesota Life Insurance Company
- Securian Life Insurance Company
- Securian Financial Services
- Securian Trust Company
- Allied Solutions
- Securian Asset Management
- Asset Allocation & Management Company (AAM)
- Securian Casualty Company
- American Modern Life Insurance Company
- Southern Pioneer Life Insurance Company
