= Ralph Doty =

American educator and politician (1941–2020)

Ralph Russell Doty (July 20, 1941 – June 13, 2020) was an American educator and politician.

Doty was born in Duluth, Minnesota and graduated from Central High School in Duluth in 1959. His parents were Russell and Naomi Doty. He received his bachelor's degree from the University of Minnesota Duluth in 1963, his master's degree from the University of Notre Dame in 1965 and his doctorate degree from the University of Minnesota in 1968. Doty taught at the College of St. Scholastica in Duluth. He also served as president at several community colleges - Vermilion Community College in Minnesota, St. Louis Community College–Meramec in Missouri, and Lakeland Community College in Ohio. Doty served in the Minnesota Senate from 1971 to 1976 and was a Democrat. His brother Gary Doty also served in the Minnesota Legislature and as mayor of Duluth. Ralph Doty died at the age of 78 in Duluth, Minnesota, on June 13, 2020.
