= List of mayors of Duluth, Minnesota =

Mayor of Duluth

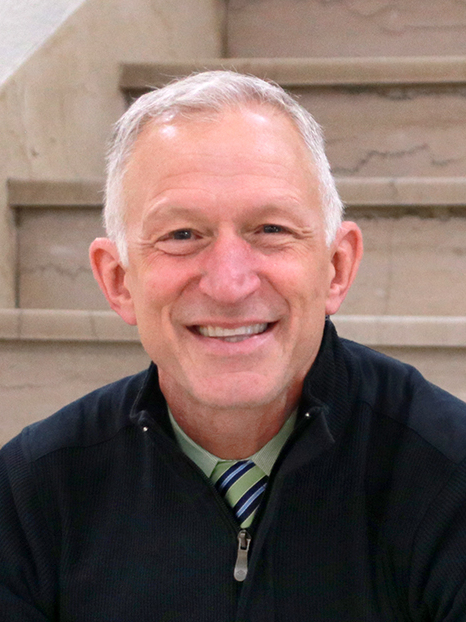
- Incumbent; Roger Reinert since January 4, 2024
- Seat: Duluth City Hall
- Term length: Four years
- Inaugural holder: Joshua B. Culver
- Formation: 1870
- Website: duluthmn.gov/mayor

The mayor of Duluth is the chief executive officer of Duluth, Minnesota, and is responsible for overseeing the city's administration. The Mayor's Office is located in the Duluth Civic Center Historic District. This article is a list of people who have served as mayor.

== List ==
| No. | Image | Mayor | Term | Party | Ref |
|---|---|---|---|---|---|
| 1 | | Joshua B. Culver | 1870–1871 | Democratic | |
| 2 | | Clinton Markell | 1871–1872 | | |
| 3 | | Sidney Luce | 1872 | | |
| 4 | | Vespasian Smith | 1873–1874 | | |
| 5 | | Peter Dean | 1875 | | |
| 6 | | John Drew | 1876–1879 | | |
| 7 | | Peter Dean | 1880 ^{‡} | | |
| 8 | | Josaiah Davis Ensign | 1881–1882 | | |
| 9 | | Charles Hinman Graves | 1882–1883 | Republican | |
| 10 | | Joshua B. Culver | 1883 ^{‡} | Democratic | |
| 11 | | Josaiah Davis Ensign | 1884 ^{‡} | | |
| 12 | | Horace B. Moore | 1885 | | |
| 13 | | John B. Sutphin | 1886–1889 | | |
| 14 | | Marcus J. Davis | 1890–1891 | | |
| 15 | | Charles d'Autremont | 1892–1893 | Democratic | |
| 16 | | Ray T. Lewis | 1894–1895 | Republican | |
| 17 | | Henry Truelsen | 1896–1900 | People's | |
| 18 | | Trevanion W. Hugo | 1900–1903 | Republican | |
| 19 | | Dr. Marcus B. Cullum | 1904–1907 | Democratic | |
| 20 | | R.D. Haven | 1908–1909 | Republican | |
| 21 | | Dr. Marcus B. Cullum | 1910–1911 ^{‡} | Democratic | |
| 22 | | John A. McCuen | 1912 | Republican | |
| 23 | | William I. Prince | 1913–1917 | | |
| 24 | | Clarence R. Magney | 1917–1920 | | |
| 25 | | Trevanion W. Hugo | 1920–1921 ^{‡} | Republican | |
| 26 | | Samuel F. Snively | 1921–1937 | Farmer–Labor | |
| 27 | | Carl Rudolf Berghult | 1937–1941 | Republican | |
| 28 | | Edward H. Hatch | 1941–1945 | | |
| 29 | | George W. Johnson | 1945–1953 | Republican | |
| 30 | | George D. Johnson | 1953–1956 | | |
| 31 | | Eugene R. Lambert | 1956–1959 | | |
| 32 | | E. Clifford Mork | 1959–1962 | | |
| 33 | | George D. Johnson | 1963–1967 ^{‡} | | |
| 34 | | Ben Boo | 1967–1975 | Republican | |
| 35 | | Robert Beaudin | 1975–1979 | Democratic–Farmer–Labor | |
| 36 | | John Fedo | 1979–1992 | Democratic–Farmer–Labor | |
| 37 | | Gary Doty | 1992–2004 | Democratic–Farmer–Labor | |
| 38 | | Herb Bergson | 2004–2008 | Democratic–Farmer–Labor | |
| 39 | | Don Ness | 2008–2016 | Democratic–Farmer–Labor | |
| 40 | | Emily Larson | 2016–2024 | Democratic–Farmer–Labor | |
| 41 | | Roger Reinert | 2024–present | Democratic–Farmer–Labor | |

‡ = second time in office
