= Gary Doty =

American politician

37th Mayor of Duluth
- In office 1992 – January 5, 2004
- Preceded by: John Fedo
- Succeeded by: Herb Bergson

Personal details
- Born: February 5, 1948 (age 78) Duluth, Minnesota
- Party: Democratic-Farmer-Labor
- Spouse: Marcia Doty
- Relations: Ralph Doty (brother)

Gary Doty (born February 5, 1948) is an American politician from Duluth, Minnesota, and a former mayor of that city.

== Early life ==
Doty was born in Duluth to parents Russell and Naomi Doty, and was educated in the public school system there, graduating from Central High School in 1966, before going on to the University of Minnesota Duluth. After graduating in 1970 with a B.S. in education, he was involved with a Young Advocate Program, which entailed work with children from correctional institutions. He also taught in the Duluth Public School system.

== Political career ==
In 1974, Doty was elected to the Minnesota House of Representatives representing the old District 8A. He served from 1975–1976, and was a member of the Crime Prevention & Corrections, Governmental Operations, and Labor-Management Relations committees. His brother Ralph served as a state senator for the Duluth area during this same time period.

Doty served on the St. Louis County Board of Commissioners during the 1980s.

Doty was elected mayor of Duluth in November 1991, taking office in January 1992. He was subsequently re-elected to two additional four-year terms. He retired from office in January 2004. He was known for his socially conservative and fiscally moderate approach to governing. He was a strong proponent of the Great Lakes Aquarium, opened in 2000, which is the only freshwater aquarium in the U.S. and has required major subsidies from the city of Duluth since its opening. Doty also helped bring the aircraft manufacturing company Cirrus Design and its two founders, the Klapmeier brothers, to Duluth in 1994. The company has gone on to produce some of the world's most popular and innovative light aircraft and has remained one of the city's largest employers since the mid-2000s.

== See also ==
- List of mayors of Duluth, Minnesota
