= College of St. Scholastica =

Private Benedictine college in Duluth, Minnesota, US

- Former name: Sacred Heart Institute (1892–1912)
- Motto: Omnes Semitae Eius Pacificae (Latin)
- Motto in English: "All her paths are peace"
- Type: Private college
- Established: 1912; 114 years ago
- Religious affiliation: Roman Catholic (Benedictine Sisters)
- Academic affiliations: ACCU NAICU CIC
- Endowment: $95.6 million (2025)
- President: Brenda S. Kelly
- Students: 2,822 (fall 2025)
- Undergraduates: 1,744 (fall 2025)
- Postgraduates: 1,078 (fall 2025)
- Location: Duluth, Minnesota, U.S. 46.8161°N 92.1062°W
- Campus: Suburban, 186 acres (75 ha)
- Colors: Royal blue & gold
- Nickname: Saints
- Sporting affiliations: NCAA Division III – UMAC, NCHA, CCSA
- Mascot: Storm the Saint Bernard
- Website: css.edu
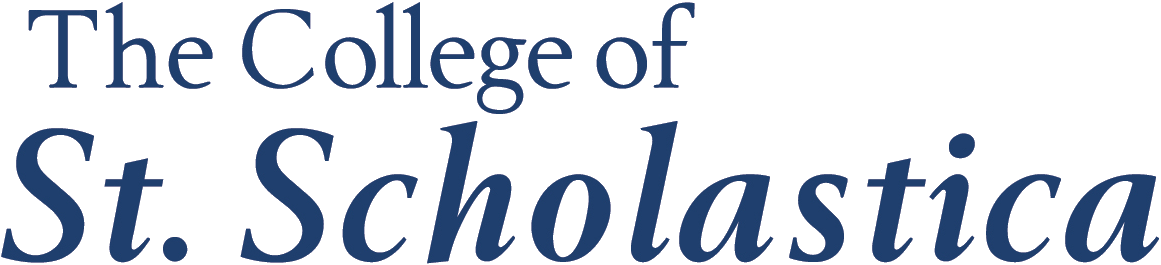

The College of St. Scholastica (CSS) is a private Benedictine college in Duluth, Minnesota, United States. It was founded in 1912 by a group of Benedictine Sisters and enrolled about 3,000 students as of 2023. The college offers a liberal arts education and is located on 186 wooded acres overlooking Lake Superior. Saint Scholastica was a Christian hermit traditionally regarded as the founder of the Benedictine nuns.

== History ==
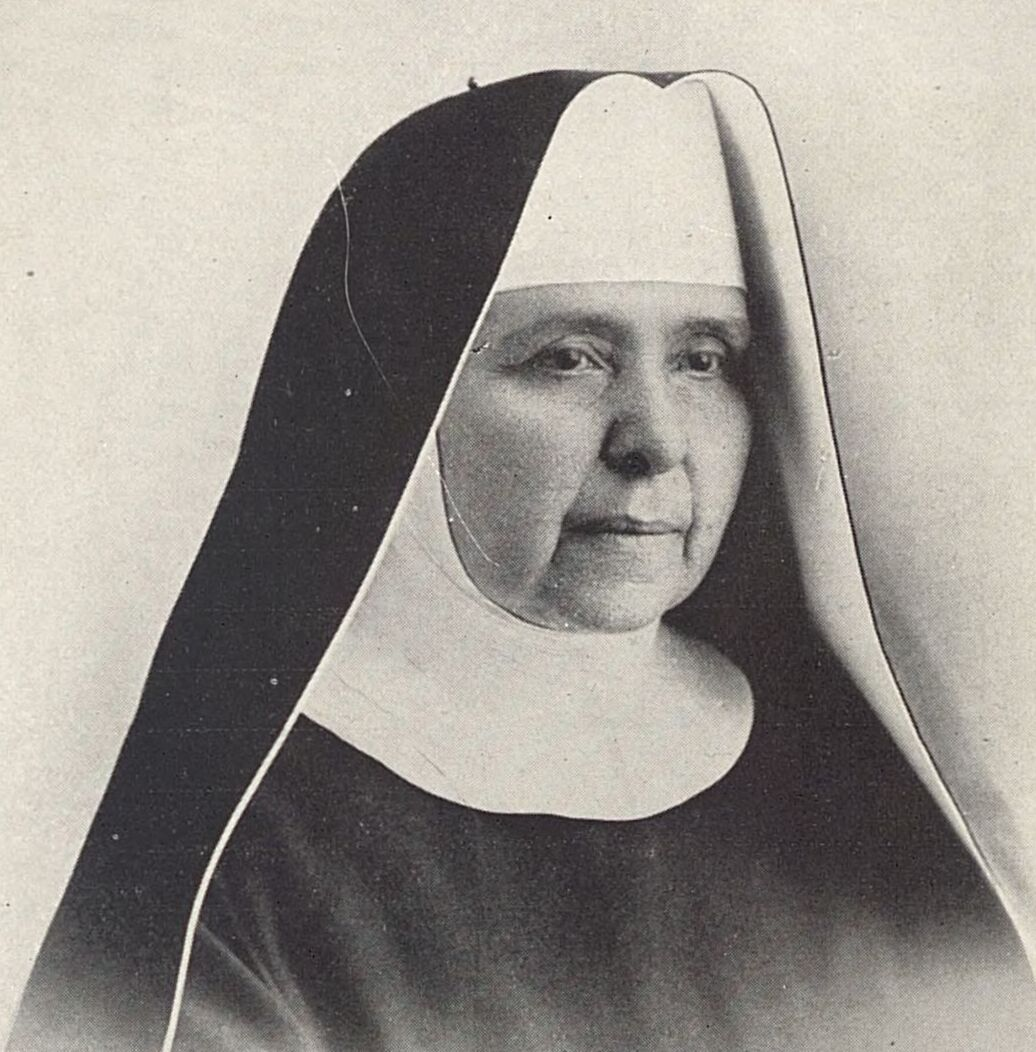
Scholastica Kerst

An early building

The College of St. Scholastica owes its existence to the combining of two forces: Benedictine missionaries and the settlement of Duluth. In 1892, Scholastica Kerst and 28 sisters arrived from St. Joseph, Minnesota, to spearhead the establishment of a Benedictine motherhouse and an academy, known as the Sacred Heart Institute, in Duluth.

The school and convent were located at Munger Terrace before growth required a move to a new facility at Third Avenue East and Third Street. Named Sacred Heart Institute, the high school continued to grow rapidly. Duluth's rapid expansion led to another move in 1909 to its present location.

The school expanded its course offerings in 1912 to include a junior college and changed its name to its current moniker, the College of St. Scholastica. The college started with only six students and 52 courses offered in eight departments in its first year. Academic leadership and research were stressed early as an integral part of the college's commitment to Benedictine values.

In 1924, the college became a four-year liberal arts institute with an enrollment of 68. The school's first baccalaureate degrees were granted in 1926. In 1969, it became a fully coeducational institution.

As a Benedictine institution, the college is affiliated with the Order of Saint Benedict. Its endowment stands at more than $89.9 million.

=== Presidents ===
- Agnes Somers, 1924–1942
- Athanasius Braegeleman, 1942–1954
- Martina Hughes, 1954–1958
- Joselyn Baldeschweiler, 1958–1960
- Ann Edward Scanlon, 1960–1967
- Mary Richard Boo, 1967–1971
- F. X. Shea, 1971–1974
- Joan Braun, 1974–1975
- Bruce Stender, 1975–1981
- Daniel Pilon, 1981–1998
- Larry Goodwin, 1998–2016
- Colette McCarrick Geary, 2016–2019
- Barbara McDonald, 2019–2026
- Brenda S. Kelly, 2026–present

=== Symbols ===
The shield of the college shows a lily, blooming with three flowers symbolizing the three Persons of the Blessed Trinity. The base of the lily is enclosed by a crescent, the heraldic symbol of the Virgin Mary, and the purity of Christian teaching. Symbolizing the college, a book occupies the center of the field, bearing the motto of St. Scholastica. It is adapted from the second part of the Book of Proverbs line "Her ways are ways of beauty, and all her paths are peace," and reads in Latin, "Omnes semitae eius pacificae."

== Campuses ==
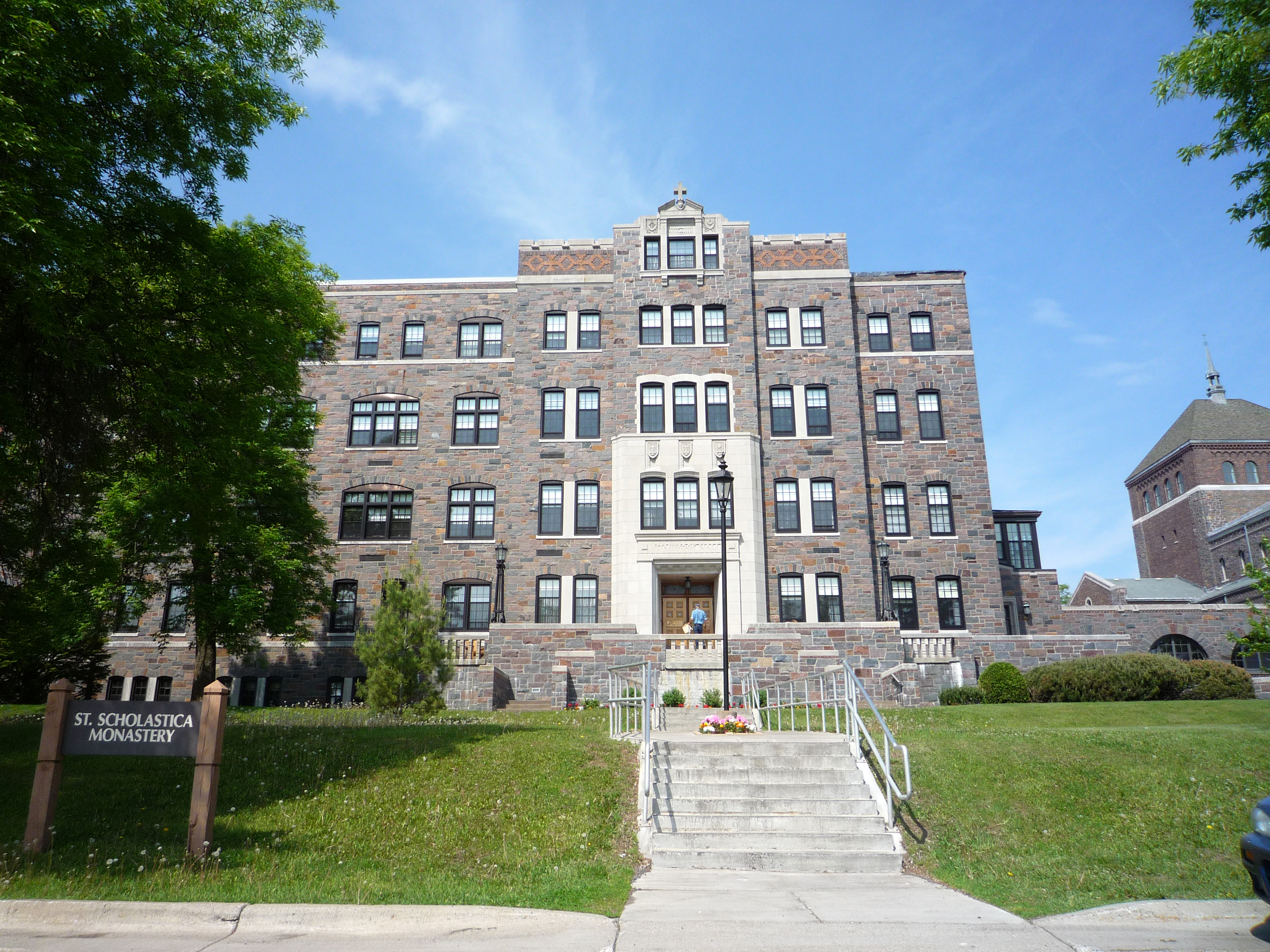
St. Scholastica Monastery

In addition to the main campus in Duluth, St. Scholastica has sites in St. Cloud, St. Paul and embedded sites in Brainerd, Austin, Cloquet, Inver Grove Heights, Rochester and a virtual campus.

The Duluth campus is home to most undergraduate students. The 186-acre campus is set on a hill overlooking Lake Superior. Campus buildings include: Tower Hall, the Science Center, Our Lady Queen of Peace Chapel, Burns Wellness Commons, the 500-seat Mitchell Auditorium, the College Library, the St. Scholastica Theatre, Somers Residence Hall, and nine apartment complexes. A new Health Science Center housing graduate health science programs opened for classes in 2016. The building is at 940 Woodland Ave. in the BlueStone development, about a mile from the main campus.

=== Library ===
The college library provides over 350,000 print and electronic books, full-text journal databases, interlibrary loan services, laptops, wireless Internet access, group study rooms, and quiet study space. It is located on the upper floors of the Romanesque-styled Our Lady Queen of Peace Chapel building. Along with the library, the college archives preserves the written and visual history of the college, as well as housing special collections such as the papers of James Franklin Lewis.

=== Tower Hall ===
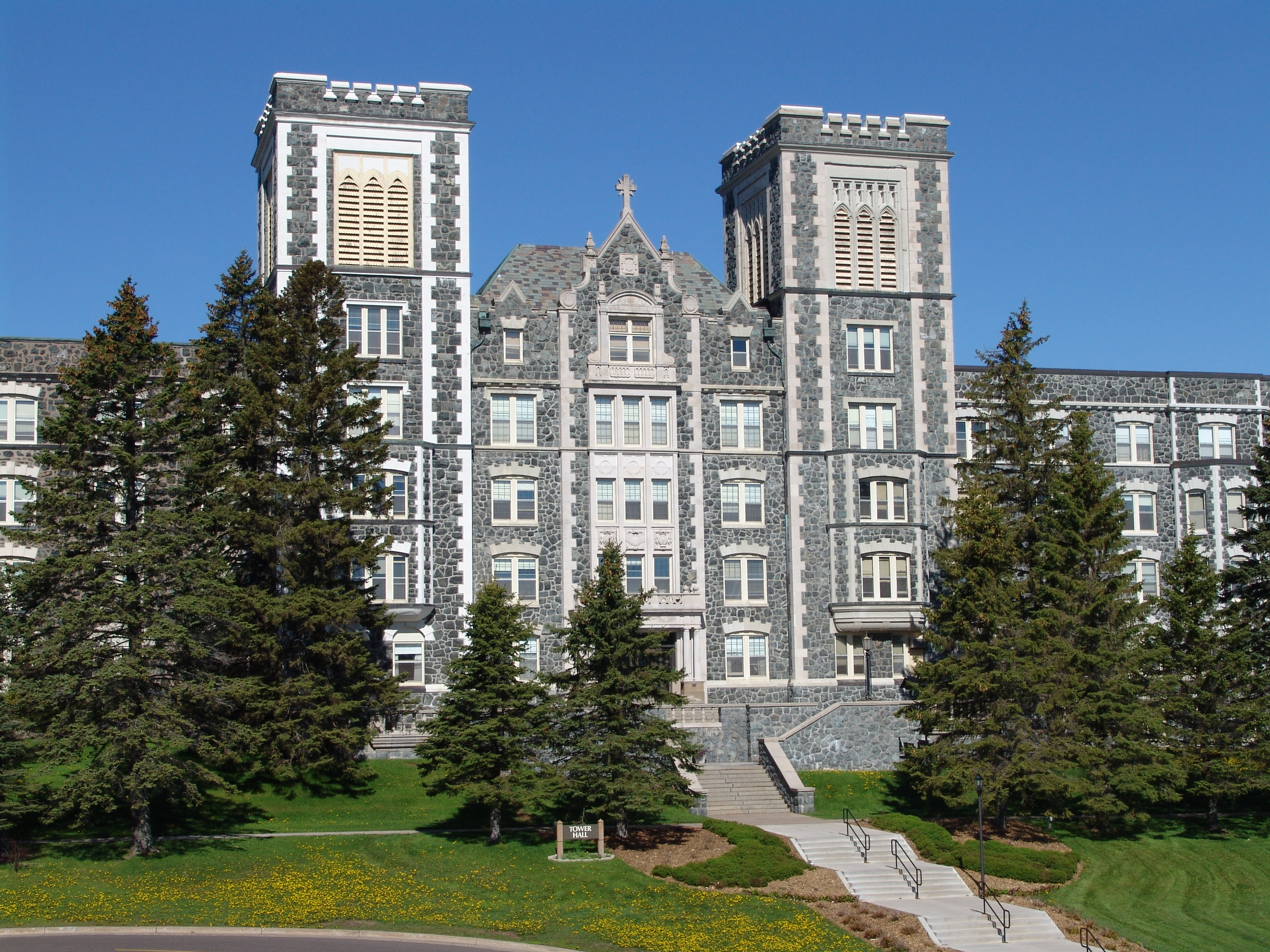
Tower Hall

Tower Hall is St. Scholastica's castle-like central building. Its origins date to a picnic in around 1907, when the Diocese of Duluth's Bishop James McGolrick commented that the top of the hill at the college's current site was a perfect location for a building. According to the historic records of Sister Agnes Somers, McGolrick and a group of students and sisters climbed to the top of the hill and placed a pile of stones, symbolizing the cornerstone of what would eventually become Tower Hall.

In 1906, architects Anton Werner Lignell and Frederick German were hired to draw the plans for the school, Villa Sancta Scholastica Academy, and the motherhouse. Scholastica Kerst disapproved of the plans due to potential defects in the building's design, and the two architects were fired from the project in 1908; it was taken over by Franklin Ellerbe. The following year saw the groundbreaking and start of construction for Tower Hall. Its first unit was completed in 1909. That September, 75 students from the Institute of the Sacred Heart were relocated to what was then called Villa St. Scholastica. Tower Hall was completed in 1928, and had two towers, a north to south axis of 375 feet, turrets at each end, recessed fenestration, and Tudor towers flanking the façade.

In September 2012, the college's Centennial year, St. Scholastica opened a 40,000 square-foot addition to its existing 125,000 square-foot Science Center. The addition includes seven laboratories for chemistry and biochemistry, six faculty-undergraduate student research areas, two classrooms for pre-laboratory meetings and general class use, faculty offices, an atrium-style gathering area, a greenhouse, and state-of-the-art environmental and sustainable technologies throughout, including for storage of chemicals and treatment of hazardous waste.

== Academics ==
Academic rankings

National
- U.S. News & World Report: 259 (tie)
- Washington Monthly: 159

The college awards bachelor's, master's degrees, and doctoral degrees.

In its 2025 rankings, U.S. News & World Report ranked the university's undergraduate program 259th (tied) among 436 national universities.

== Student life ==
=== Campus housing ===
St. Scholastica houses students living on campus in nine buildings. They are:

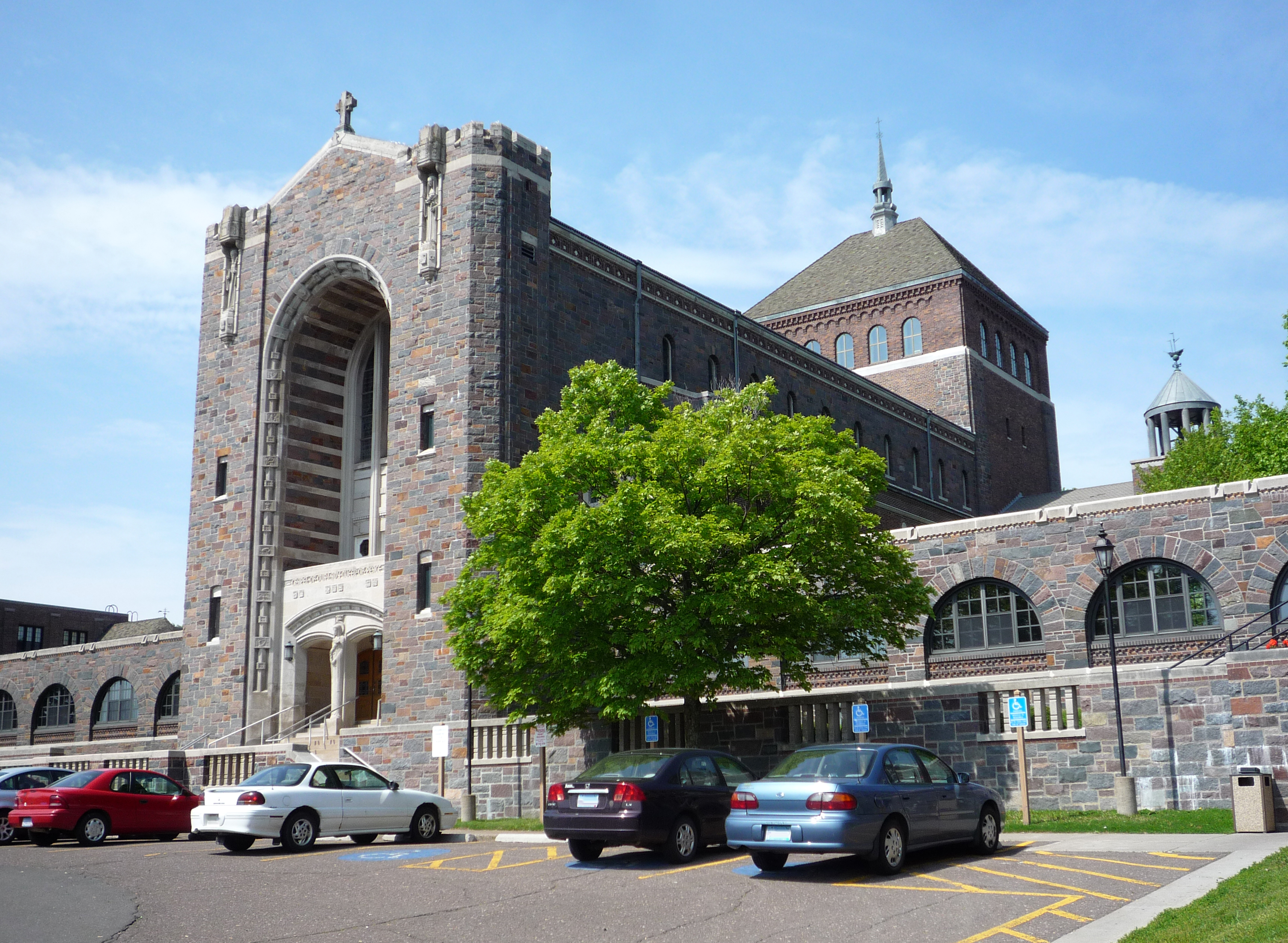
Our Lady Queen of Peace Chapel

- Cedar Hall Apartments – Opened in 2003. 100 residents. Total square footage 875 sq ft (81.3 m^{2})/unit.
- Kerst Hall – Opened in 2005. 160 students. Total square footage 875 sq ft (81.3 m^{2})/unit.
- Pine, Maple, Willow and Birch Apartments – Nearly identical. Built in 1973, 1989, 1989, and 1990 respectively. 43 residents each. Total square footage 716 sq ft (66.5 m^{2})/unit.
- Scanlon Hall – Opened in 2005. 128 residents. Total square footage 875 sq ft (81.3 m^{2})/unit.
- Somers Hall – Built in 1964. Primarily first-year housing. Population 314 students. Building also houses the Greenview Dining Room, Somers Main Lounge, Office of Residential Life, Health Services, Campus Operator, and a penthouse lounge/study area. Dorms measure 9'3" x 17'4" (double room) and 6'5" x 17'4" (single-room).
- Somers Suites – Built in 1993. Connected to Somers Hall. Four floors. Suites have a square footage of 525 sq ft (48.8 m^{2}) (two-bedroom) or 775 sq ft (72.0 m^{2}). (three-bedroom).

=== Student Government Association ===
The College of St. Scholastica Student Government Association (SGA) is responsible for making decisions and advocating for policy that impacts the student body.

== Athletics ==
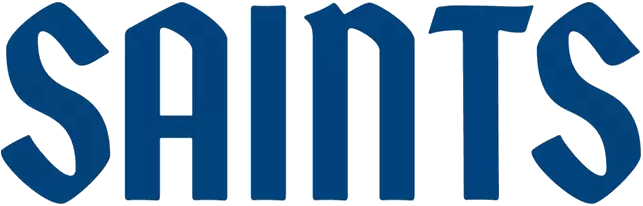
St. Scholastica athletics wordmark

The College of St. Scholastica fields 22 athletic teams, including 11 women's teams (basketball, cross country, Nordic skiing, soccer, softball, indoor track & field, outdoor track & field, hockey, tennis, golf, and volleyball) and 11 men's teams (basketball, cross country, Nordic skiing, soccer, baseball, indoor track & field, outdoor track & field, hockey, football, golf, and tennis). The college's athletic teams are called the Saints. All teams, except Nordic skiing, compete in the Minnesota Intercollegiate Athletic Conference, which is part of the NCAA's Division III.

== Notable people ==
- Mary Odile Cahoon – Benedictine nun who was among the first women to do research in Antarctica
- Erma Clardy Craven – African-American anti-abortion activist
- Mary Olivia Gowan – Benedictine nun and dean of the Catholic University of America School of Nursing, which she helped to establish
- Scott Jurek – class of 1996, ultramarathon runner
- Emily Larson – class of 1995, former mayor of Duluth
- Mary Murphy – class of 1961, Minnesota House of Representatives
- Don Ness – class of 2014, mayor of Duluth
- Michael Paymar – class of 1983, Minnesota House of Representatives
- Ellen Pence – class of 1991, domestic abuse prevention advocate
- Patrick J. Schiltz – class of 1981, U. S. district judge, District of Minnesota
- Kathleen Seefeldt – class of 1956, chairman of Prince William County, Virginia Board of Supervisors
