= Waialua Fire Station =

- U.S. National Register of Historic Places
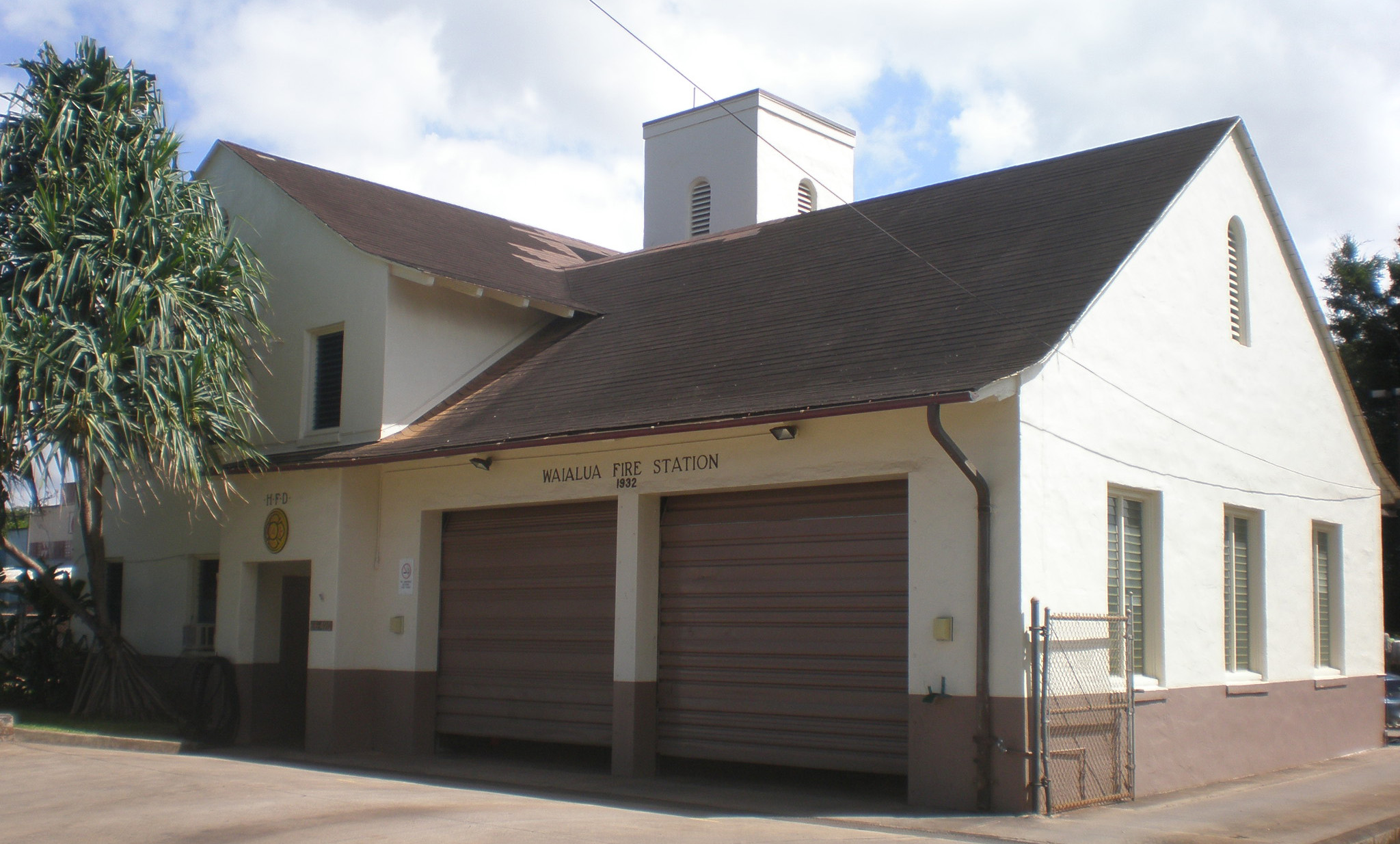
- Waialua Fire Station in 2009

- Location within Hawaii
- Location: 66--420 Haleiwa Rd., Haleiwa, Hawaii
- Coordinates: 21°35′15″N 158°06′43″W
- Area: 0.2 acres (0.081 ha)
- Built: 1932
- Architect: A. W. Heen
- Architectural style: Mission/spanish Revival, Mediterranean Revival
- NRHP reference No.: 80001270
- Added to NRHP: December 2, 1980

The Waialua Fire Station (Honolulu Fire Station 14) is one of the seven Fire Stations of Oahu listed on the National Register of Historic Places since 1980. It is located at 66-420 Haleiwa Rd, in Haleʻiwa, Hawaii.

== History ==
The building was designed in 1932 by A. W. Heen.

In 2020, the Honolulu Fire Department announced the acquisition of a new land where a new Waialua fire station was to be constructed to replace the old one. Increasing regional wildfire justify the growing necessity for a new fire station. In April 2026, heavy floods rendered the fire station inhabitable.

== Description ==
The right half of the building is used as parking for fire engines. The left building houses offices and sleeping quarters.

== See also ==
- Fire Stations of Oahu
