= Kaimuki-McKinley-Roosevelt Complex Area =

Hawaii Department of Education complex area

Coordinates: 21.2830°N 157.7854°W

Honolulu, Hawaii
- Grades: PK-12
- Established: 22 January 2002
- District: Honolulu District
- Region: Honolulu, Hawaii
- Country: United States

District Information
- Superintendent: Ann Mahi (interim)
- Accreditation(s): Western Association of Schools and Colleges
- Schools: 36

Students and staff
- Students: c.18,356
- Teachers: c. 1,085
- Student-Teacher Ratio: 1:17
- Athletic Conference: OIA East

The Kaimuki-McKinley-Roosevelt Complex Area is one of nine Hawaii Department of Education complex areas on the island of Oahu, Hawaii, USA. It is part of the Honolulu District and operates two community schools, three high schools, five middle schools, nineteen elementary schools, five public charter schools, and two special schools.

== Community schools ==
School name	Area
Kaimuki Community School	Kaimuki
McKinley Community School	Honolulu

== High schools ==
School name	Mascot	Area	Enrollment	Student-Teacher Ratio
Kaimuki High School	Bulldogs	Kaimuki	750	16.3
McKinley High School	Tigers	Honolulu	1945	17
Roosevelt High School	Rough Riders	Honolulu	1672	18.6

== Middle schools ==
School name	Mascot	Area	Enrollment	Student-Teacher Ratio
Central Middle School	Bulldogs	Honolulu	457	15
Kawananakoa Middle School	Warriors	Honolulu	803	17
Jarrett Middle School	Vikings	Palolo	285	11
Stevenson Middle School	Buccaneers	Honolulu	616	13
Washington Middle School	Eagles	Honolulu	1032	17

== Elementary schools ==
School name	Mascot	Area	Enrollment	Student-Teacher Ratio
Ala Wai Elementary School	Menehune	Honolulu	459	15
Alliolani Elementary School	Aliʻi Warriors	Kaimuki	285	15
Hokulani Elementary School	Stars	Kaimuki	368	19
Jefferson Elementary School	Surfers	Waikiki	380	13
Kaahumanu Elementary School	Dolphins	Honolulu	580	15
Kaiulani Elementary School	Peacock	Kalihi	401	16
Kauluwela Elementary School	Cubs	Honolulu	378	16
Kuhio Elementary School	Dolphins	Honolulu	323	16
Lanakila Elementary School	Chiefs	Honolulu	312	15
Lincoln Elementary School	Kolea Birds	Honolulu	398	15
Likelike Elementary School	Hawaiian Owls	Kalihi	394	14
Lunalilo Elementary School	Hawks	Honolulu	527	17
Maemae Elementary School	Dolphins	Nuuanu	750	19
Manoa Elementary School	Tigers	Manoa	586	19
Noelani Elementary School	Geckos	Manoa	464	18
Nuuanu Elementary School	Nene	Nuuanu	343	20
Palolo Elementary School	Pugs	Palolo	244	13
Pauoa Elementary School	Alii	Pauoa	330	14
Royal Elementary School		Honolulu	386	15

== Charter schools ==
School name	Mascot	Area	Enrollment	Student-Teacher Ratio
Education Laboratory		Manoa	416	
Halau Ku Mana		Makiki	98	28
Halau Lokahi		Kalihi	221	
Myron B. Thompson Academy		Ala Moana	694	37
Voyager	Dolphins	Manoa	221	13

== Special schools ==
School name	Mascot	Area	Enrollment	Student-Teacher Ratio
Anuenue School	Na Koa	Palolo	371	15
Jefferson Orthopedic School		Waikiki	12	

== Other Complex Areas ==
=== Honolulu District ===
Farrington-Kaiser-Kalani Complex Area
