= Hawaiʻi ʻUlu Cooperative =

Farming association in Hawaii

- Type: Agricultural cooperative
- Industry: Agriculture; food manufacturing
- Founded: 2016; 10 years ago, Hawaiʻi Island, U.S.
- Founders: Dana Shapiro; Noa Lincoln
- Headquarters: Kailua-Kona, Hawaiʻi Island, U.S.
- Products: Breadfruit (ʻulu); value-added products
- Members: Approx. 180 member farms (2025)
- Website: ulu.coop

The Hawaiʻi ʻUlu Cooperative (legally the Hawaiʻi ʻUlu Producers Cooperative) is a farmer-owned agricultural cooperative based in Hawaii that aggregates, processes, and markets breadfruit (known in the Hawaiian language as ʻulu) alongside other locally grown crops. Founded in 2016, the cooperative operates a central processing facility in South Kona and produces foods such as ʻulu flour and frozen, pre-cooked staple crops. As of 2025, the cooperative included approximately 180 member farms.

== History ==
The cooperative was established in 2016 by Dana Shapiro and Noa Lincoln, a University of Hawaiʻi researcher. Their breadfruit farm, Mala Kaluʻulu, collaborated with eight other pilot farms on Hawaiʻi Island to form the organization. The cooperative was created to develop a farmer-controlled market for ʻulu, a traditional crop that had seen a decline in commercial production. Membership grew from nine pilot farms in 2016 to 35 in 2018 and to about 110 member farms by 2021, with members tending roughly 5,200 trees. By 2025 the cooperative had roughly 180 member farms, which together produced a 220,000-pound harvest in 2024.

== Operations and products ==
Members deliver crops to a network of drop-off sites. The harvest is transported to the state's Honalo Processing and Marshalling Facility in South Kona, which the cooperative operates under a 25-year lease. To extend shelf life and maintain a year-round supply, the cooperative primarily par-steams and freezes the fruit. Fresh fruit constitutes a minority of its total sales. The facility processes raw crops into frozen, pre-cooked packs of ʻulu, kalo, ʻuala, and squash. Other commercial products include breadfruit-based hummus, ʻulu flour, and pancake mix. Between 2021 and 2024, the cooperative's annual flour production increased from 5,000 pounds to 15,000 pounds. These products are distributed through local Hawaii retailers and direct-to-consumer channels. The cooperative distributes net profits among its member farms.

== Distribution and partnerships ==
The cooperative sells most of its products to food-service buyers such as schools, hospitals, and restaurants, in addition to retail and direct-to-consumer channels. The Hawaii State Department of Education placed its first order with the cooperative in December 2017, and ʻulu was added to public-school lunch menus statewide in March 2018 through the department's ʻĀina Pono farm-to-school program. At its pre-pandemic peak, the cooperative supplied local hotels and 256 public schools. It remained a regular supplier to the department until the contract ended in 2020, by which point it had provided close to 100,000 pounds of pre-cooked frozen breadfruit, papaya, sweet potato, and banana worth about $380,000; the cooperative subsequently expanded and diversified its customer base. In October 2025, the cooperative partnered with the Hawaiʻi Farm Project to aggregate and process harvests from Maui-based member farms at a facility in Hāliʻimaile.
