= Fire Stations of Oahu =

- Central Fire Station; Kaimuki Fire Station; Kakaako Fire Station; Kalihi Fire Station; Makiki Fire Station; Palama Fire Station; Waialua Fire Station
- U.S. National Register of Historic Places
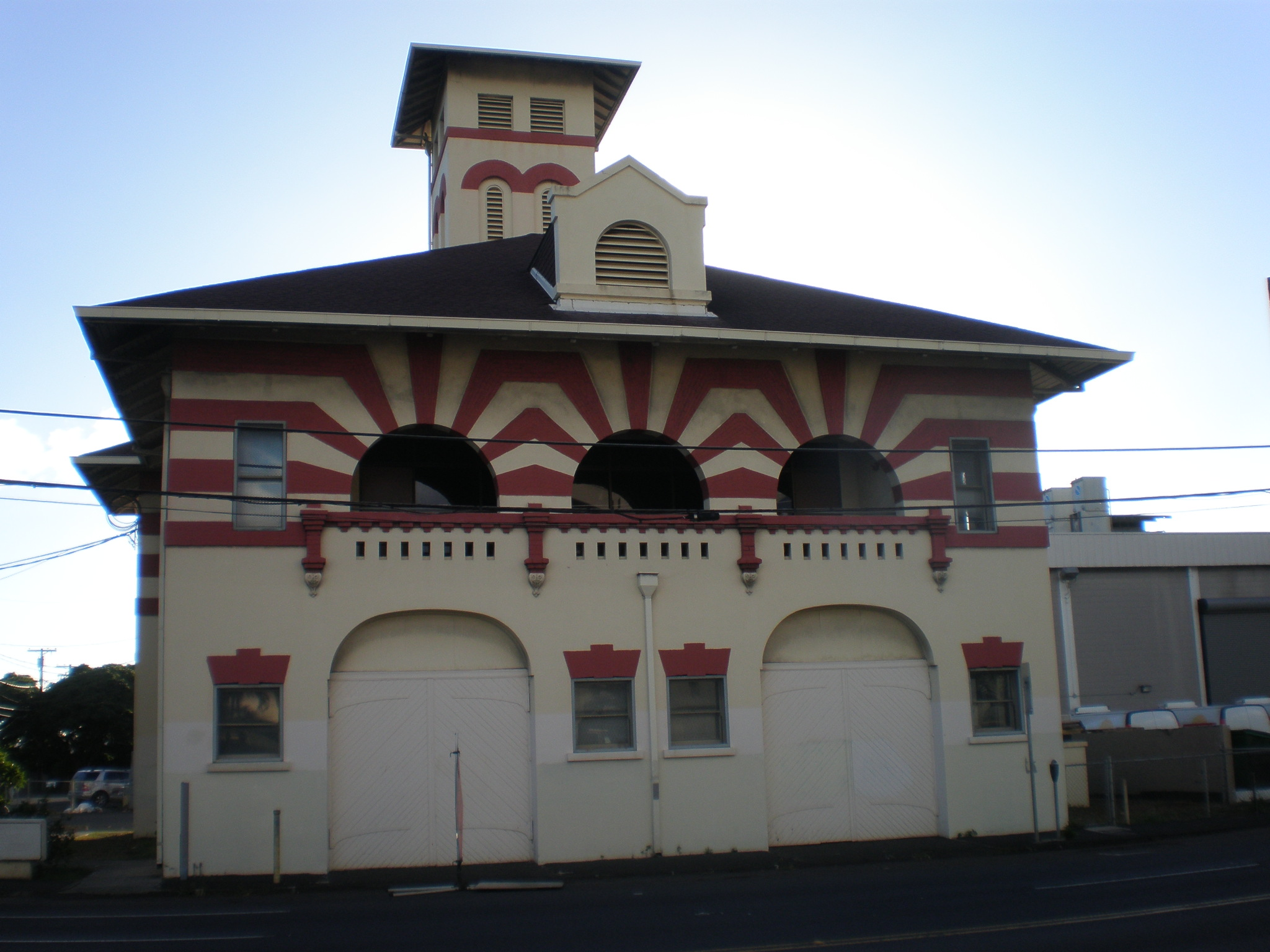
- Palama Fire Station
- Location: Hawaii
- Built: 1901–1934
- Architectural style: Mediterranean Revival
- NRHP reference No.: 80001270-80001280
- Added to NRHP: 2 December 1980

The Honolulu Fire Department (HFD) operates their 44 Fire Stations on the Island of Oahu, and in and around Honolulu. Seven current or former stations are on the National Register of Historic Places, of which five are still in use today as fire stations.

By the 1920s, the accepted style for most public architecture in Honolulu, Hawaii, was Spanish Mission Revival or, more broadly, Mediterranean Revival. Five fire stations built on Oahu between 1924 and 1932 illustrate this stylistic congruence, despite being designed by three different architects. The prototype for all five appears to have been Palama Fire Station, built in 1901 and designed by Oliver G. Traphagen. Honolulu's Central Fire Station, remodeled in 1934, is larger but somewhat similar in style, although with Art Deco embellishments. All seven buildings were added to the National Register of Historic Places on 2 December 1980, even though Palama Fire Station had been added separately on 21 April 1976.

All seven fire stations are box-shaped, two-story structures, with engine bays on the ground floor and dormitories upstairs. All have drying towers, which were required for the cloth-covered rubber hoses of the era in which they were built, but which also serve as visual landmarks and decorative elements. The buildings are all of sturdy masonry, with white stucco walls and tiled roofs, in a Mediterranean style. The Waikiki Fire Station on Kapahulu Avenue followed a similar model when it was built in 1927, but it was extensively remodeled in 1963 to fit an evolving Hawaiian rather than Mediterranean style, so it was excluded from the National Register application.

== History ==
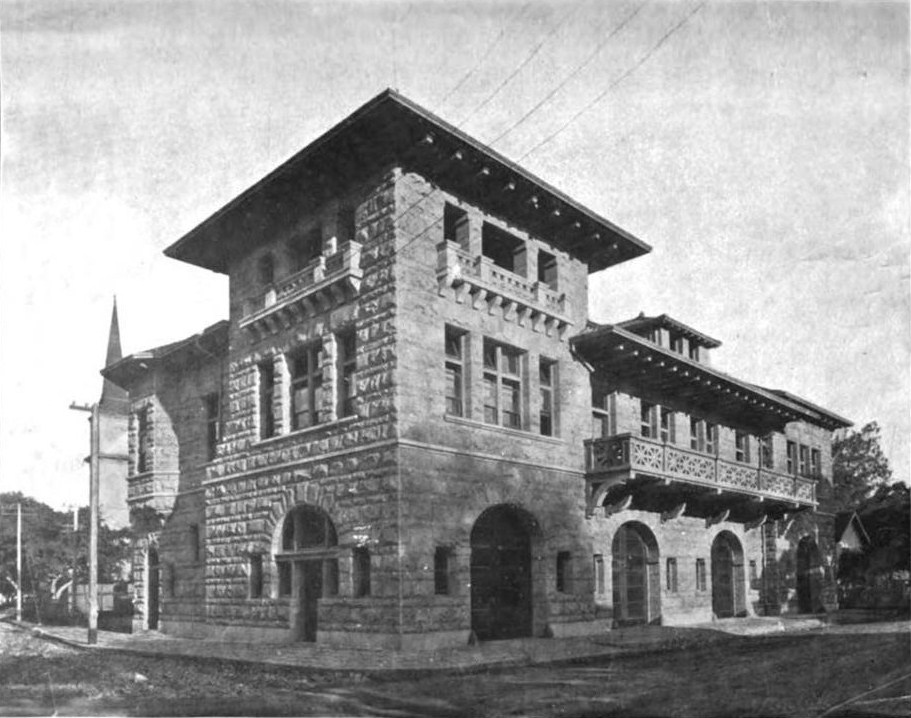
Central Fire Station, about 1901

In 1901, just after the devastating Chinatown fire of 1900, the city of Honolulu had three fire stations. The Central Fire Station at that time was a lava-rock building of two-and-a-half stories designed in 1896 by Clinton Briggs Ripley and C.W. Dickey in the Richardsonian Romanesque style that dominated the downtown area at that time. The Makiki Fire Station was a two-story wooden building designed by Ripley and Dickey in 1899. At the time he relocated to Honolulu in 1897, Oliver G. Traphagen had already designed many public buildings in Duluth, Minnesota. During the turn-of-the-century building boom after annexation, he soon became one of the busiest architects in the Territory. When he was commissioned to design the Palama Fire Station in 1901, he gave it a Mediterranean look very different from that of the Romanesque Kakaako Pumping Station he had designed the previous year.

However, the building boom faded soon afterward. Dickey relocated to Oakland, California in 1905, and Traphagen followed in 1907, after the 1906 San Francisco earthquake. The opening of the Panama Canal in 1914 set the stage for another building boom, as both tourism and migration helped fuel rapid growth during the 1920s. Many nationally known architects opened offices in the islands, and their designs often reflected a California regional style heavily influenced by the work of Bertram Goodhue at the 1915 Panama–California Exposition in San Diego. Dickey reopened an office in Honolulu in 1920 and moved back to the islands in 1925. The new fire stations of the 1920s and 1930s more closely reflected California regional styles than did Traphagen's prototype in 1901.

A new Central Fire Station was built in 1934, and is listed on the National Register of Historic Places.

== Gallery ==
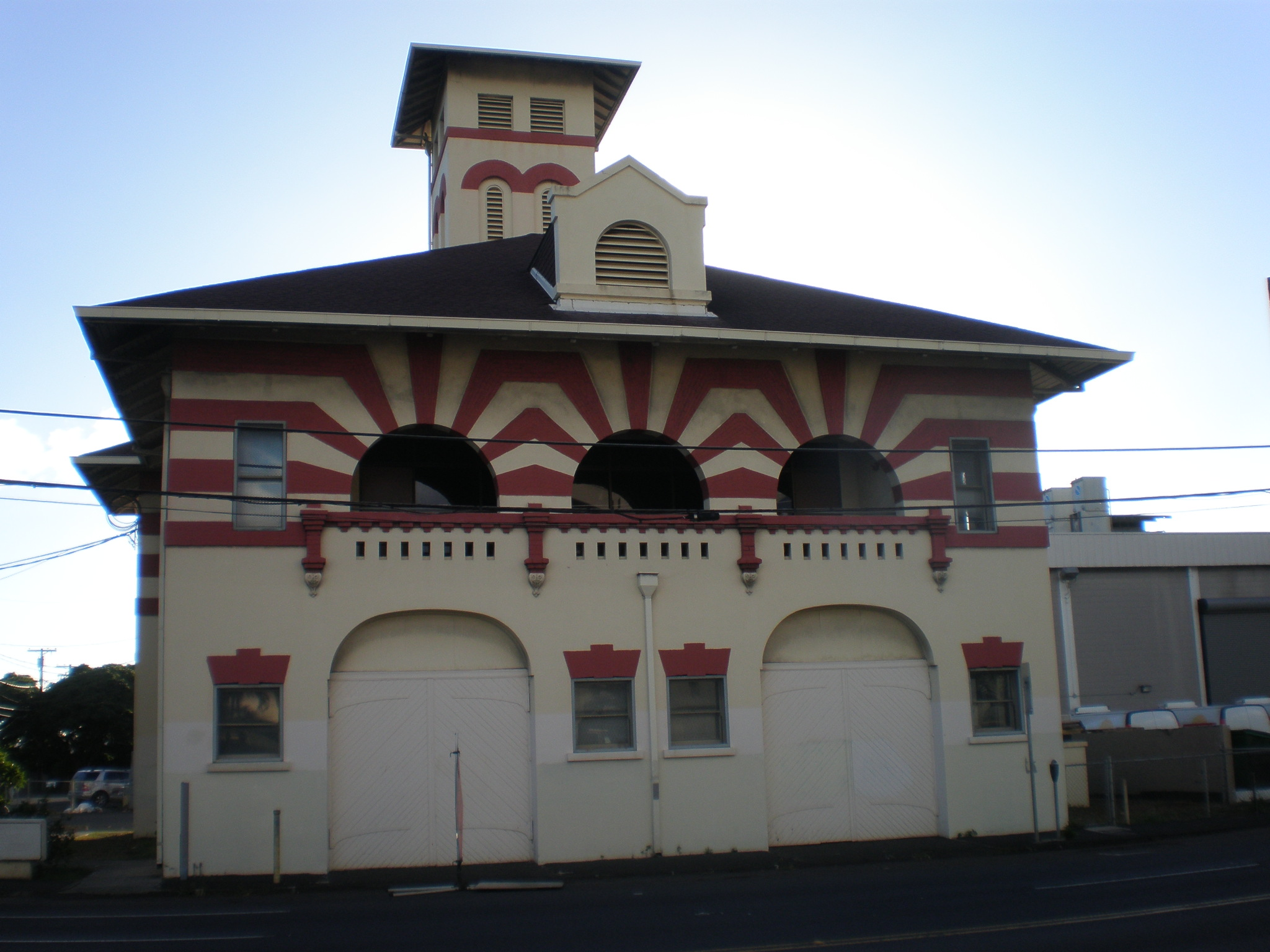
Palama Fire Station (1901), architect Oliver G. Traphagen

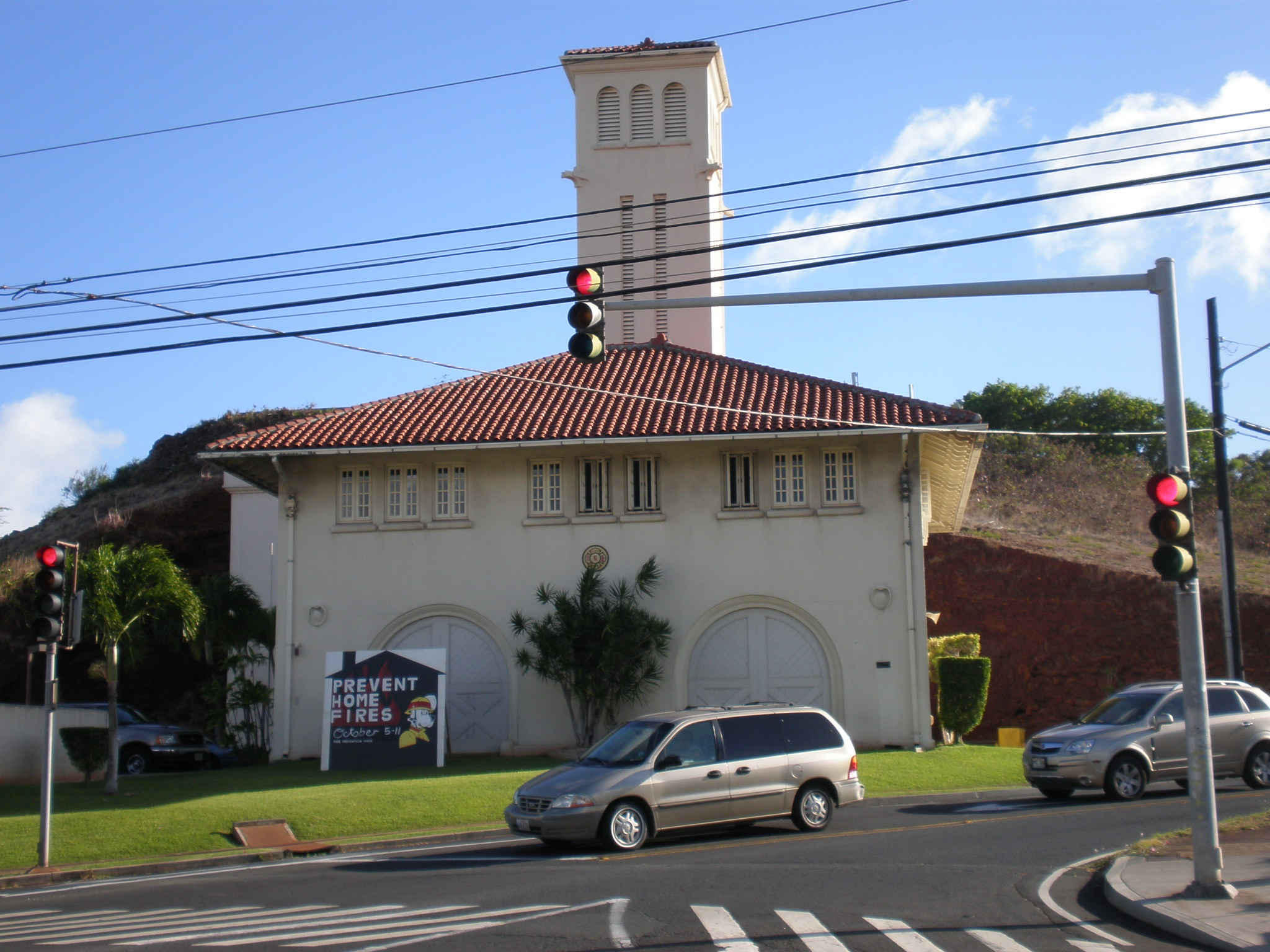
Kaimuki Fire Station (1924), architect G. R. Miller

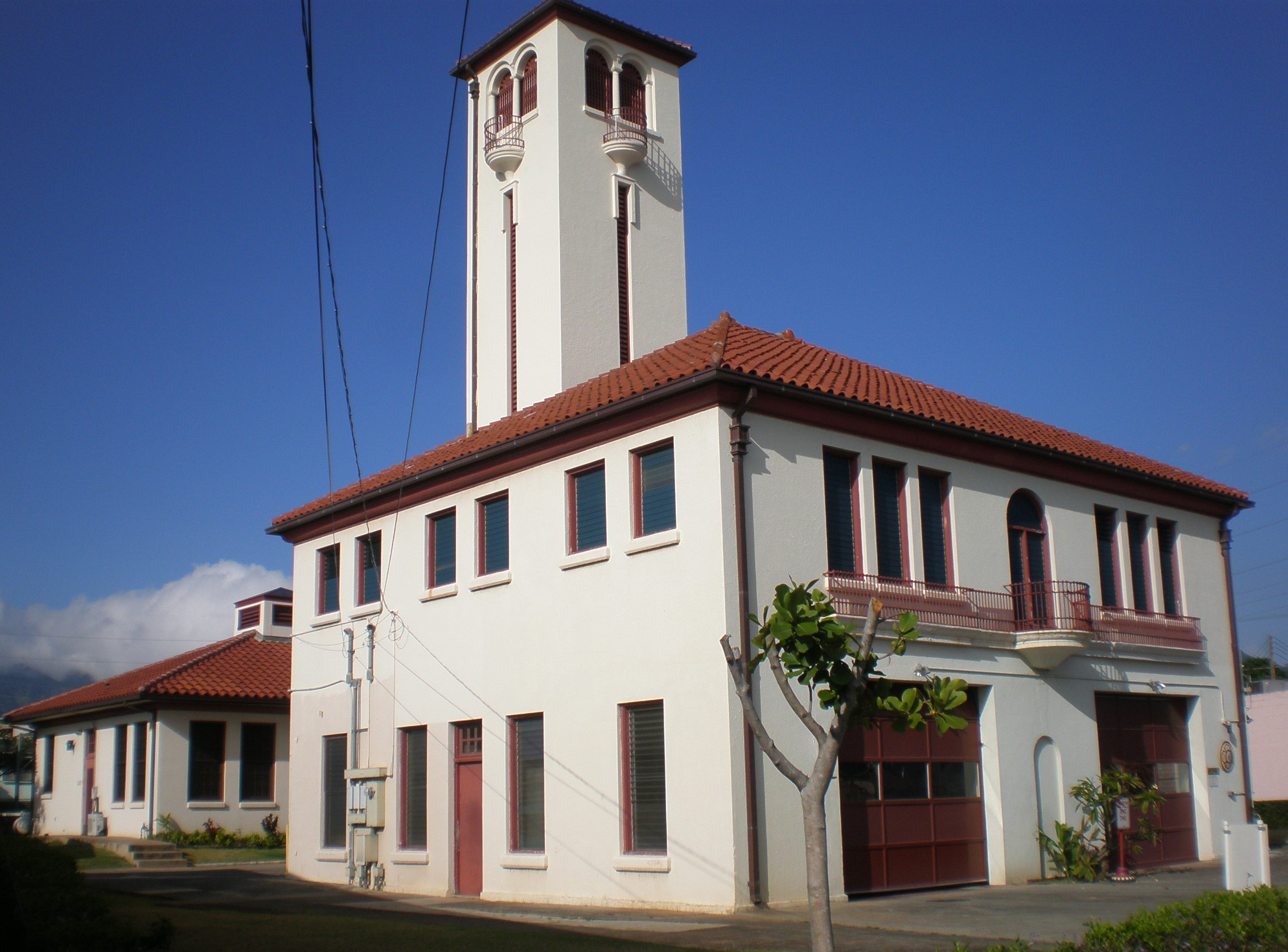
Kalihi Fire Station (1924), architect G. R. Miller

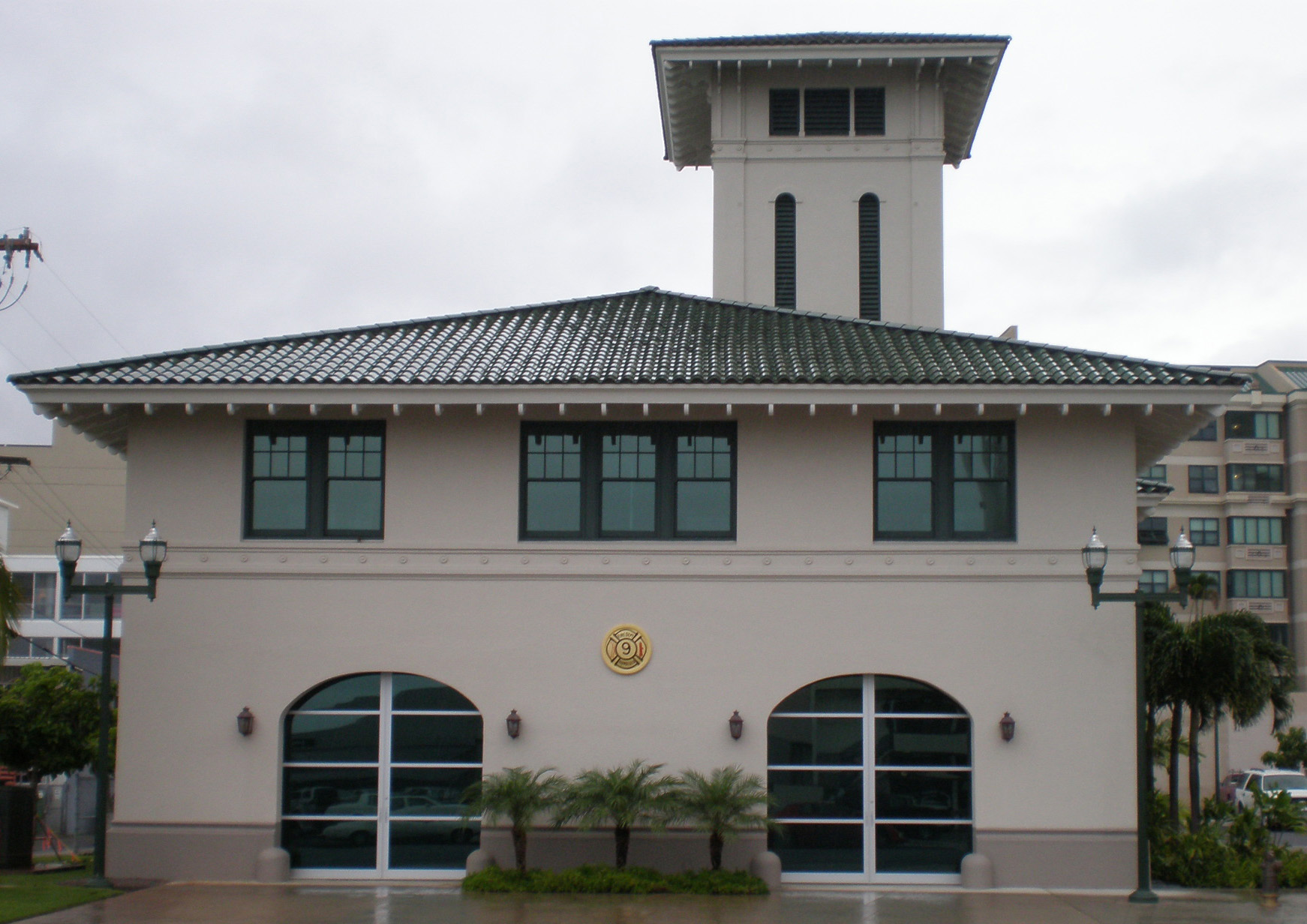
Old Kakaako Fire Station (1929), architect Solomon F. Kenn

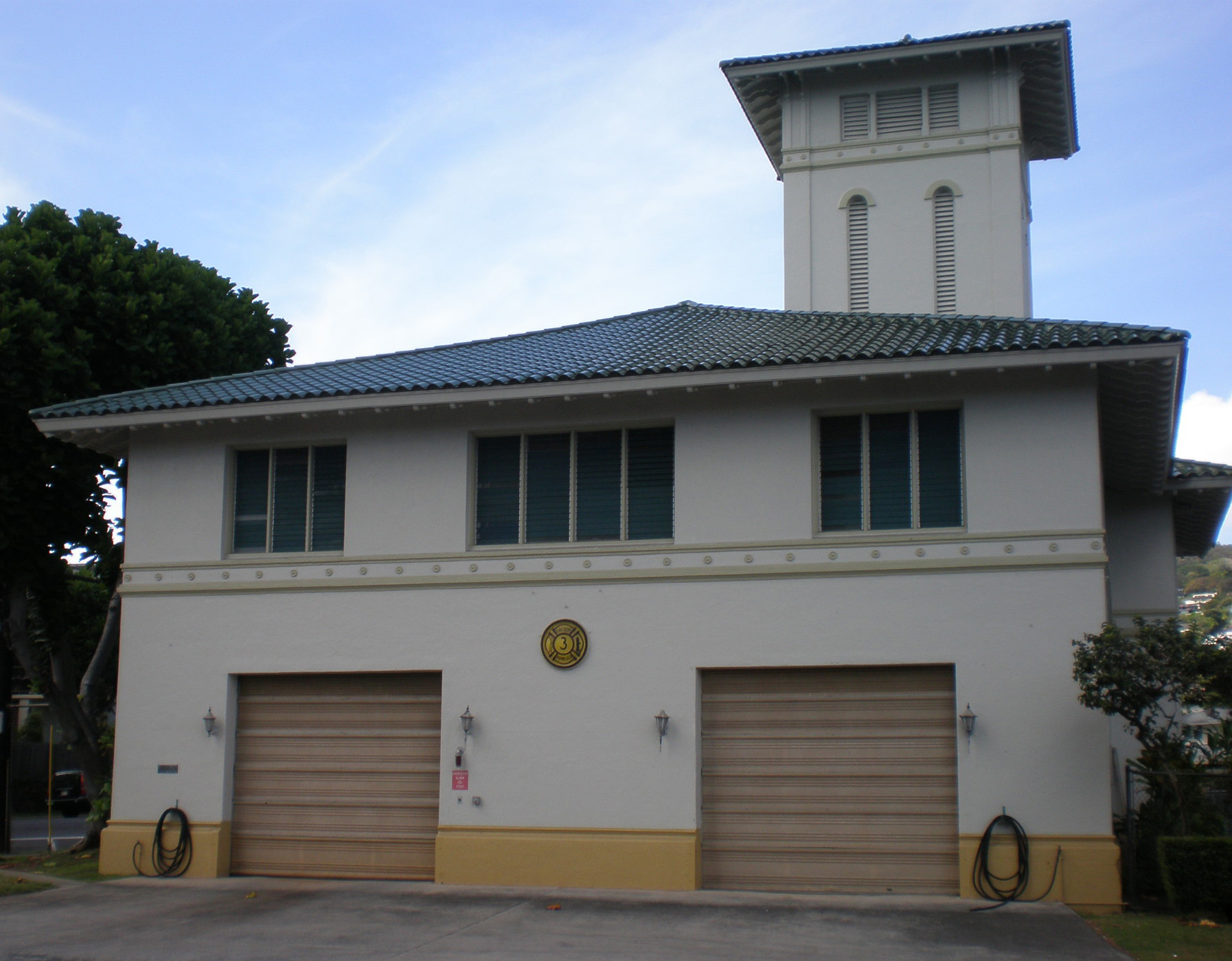
Makiki Fire Station (1929), architect Solomon F. Kenn

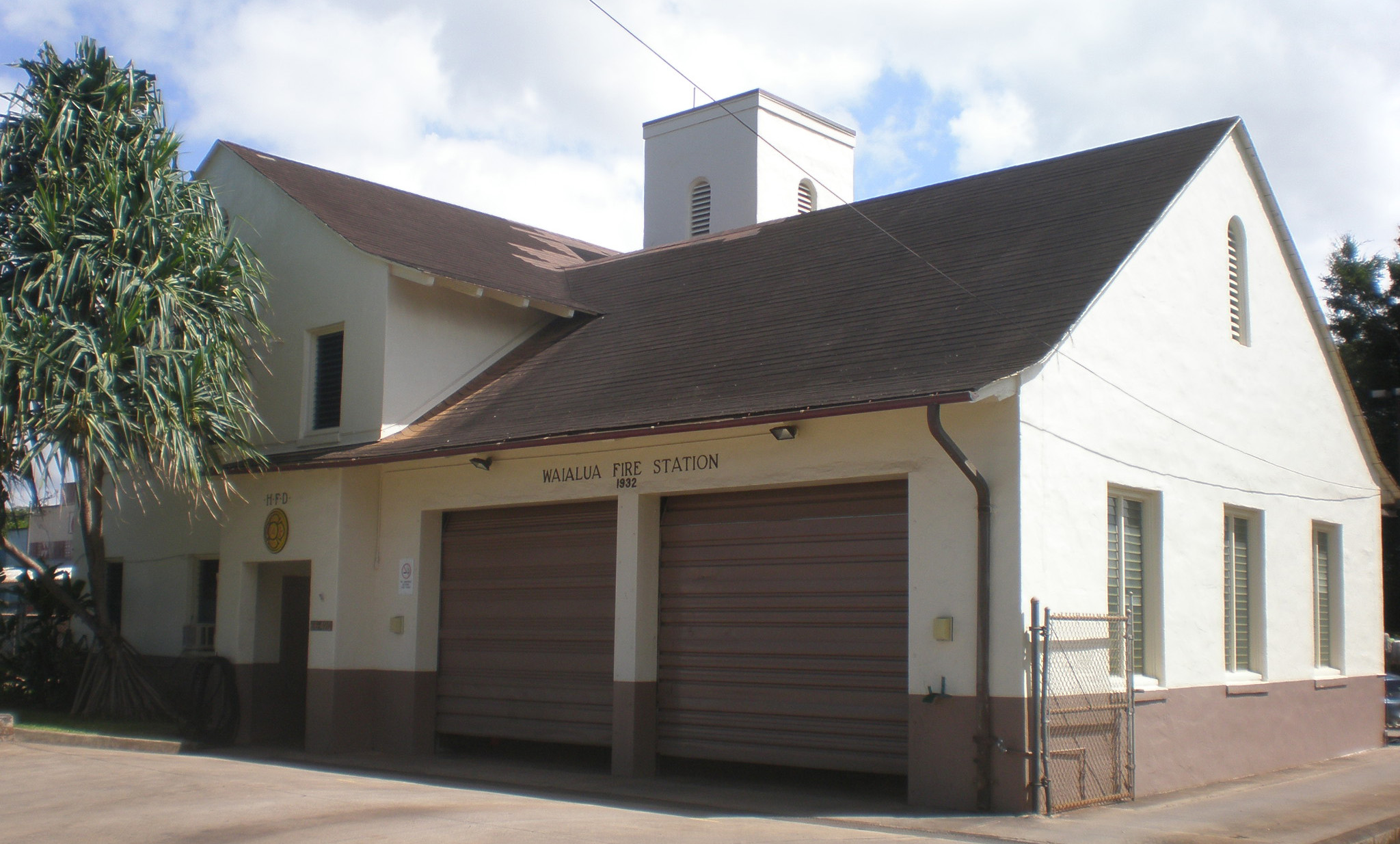
Waialua Fire Station (1932), architect A. W. Heen

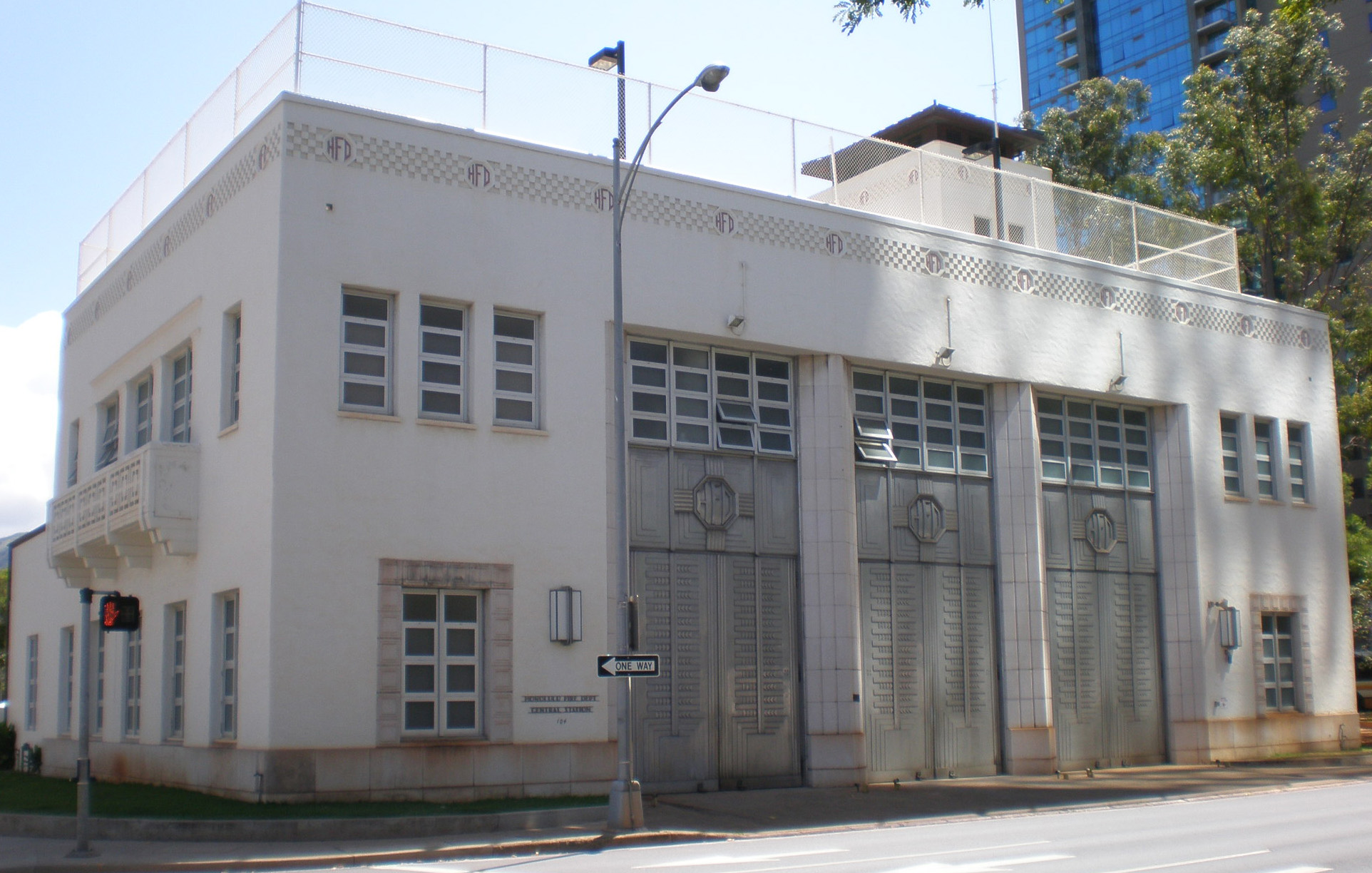
Central Fire Station (1934), architect C.W. Dickey

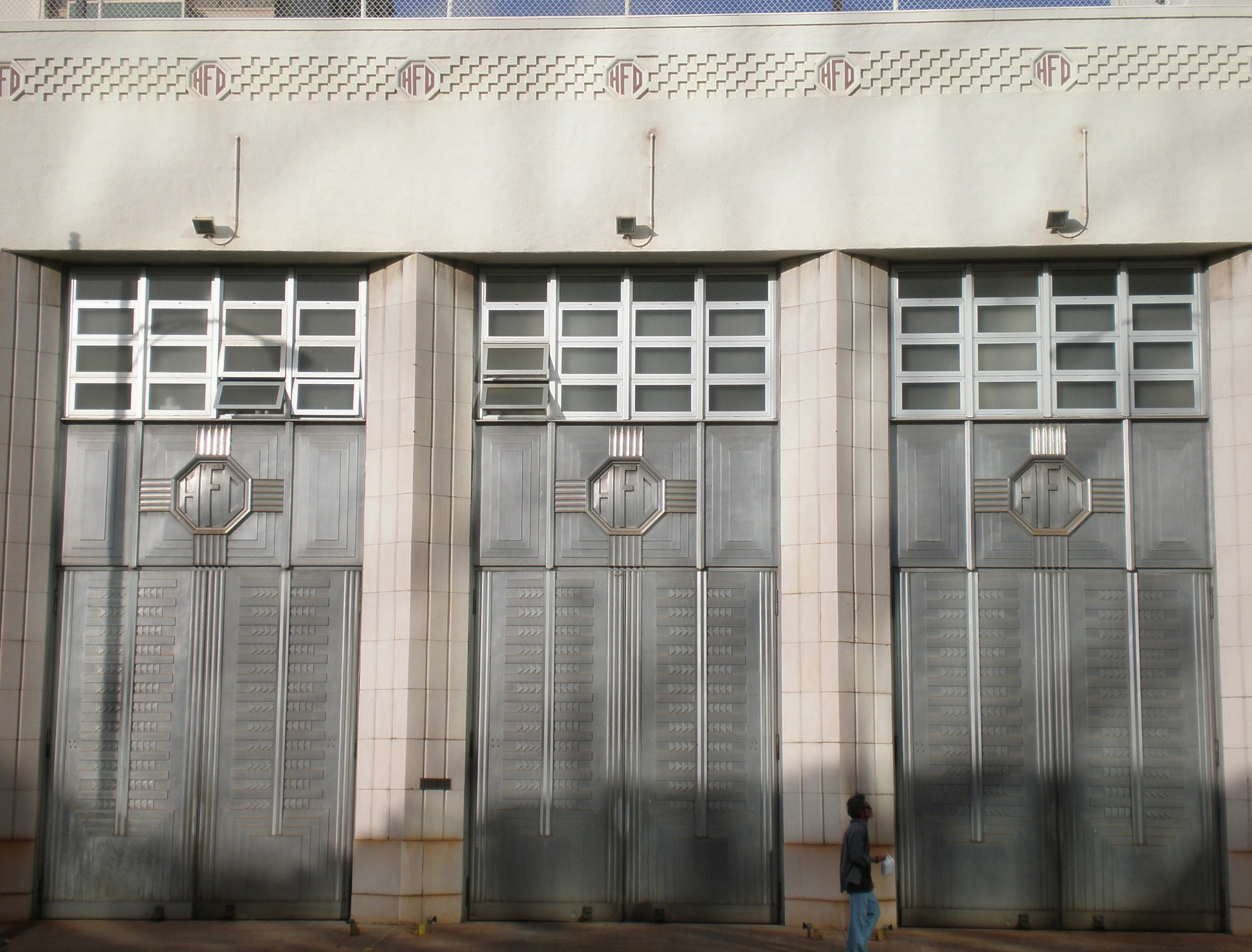
Central Fire Station (1934), Art Deco touches
