= Kaimuki Fire Station =

- U.S. National Register of Historic Places
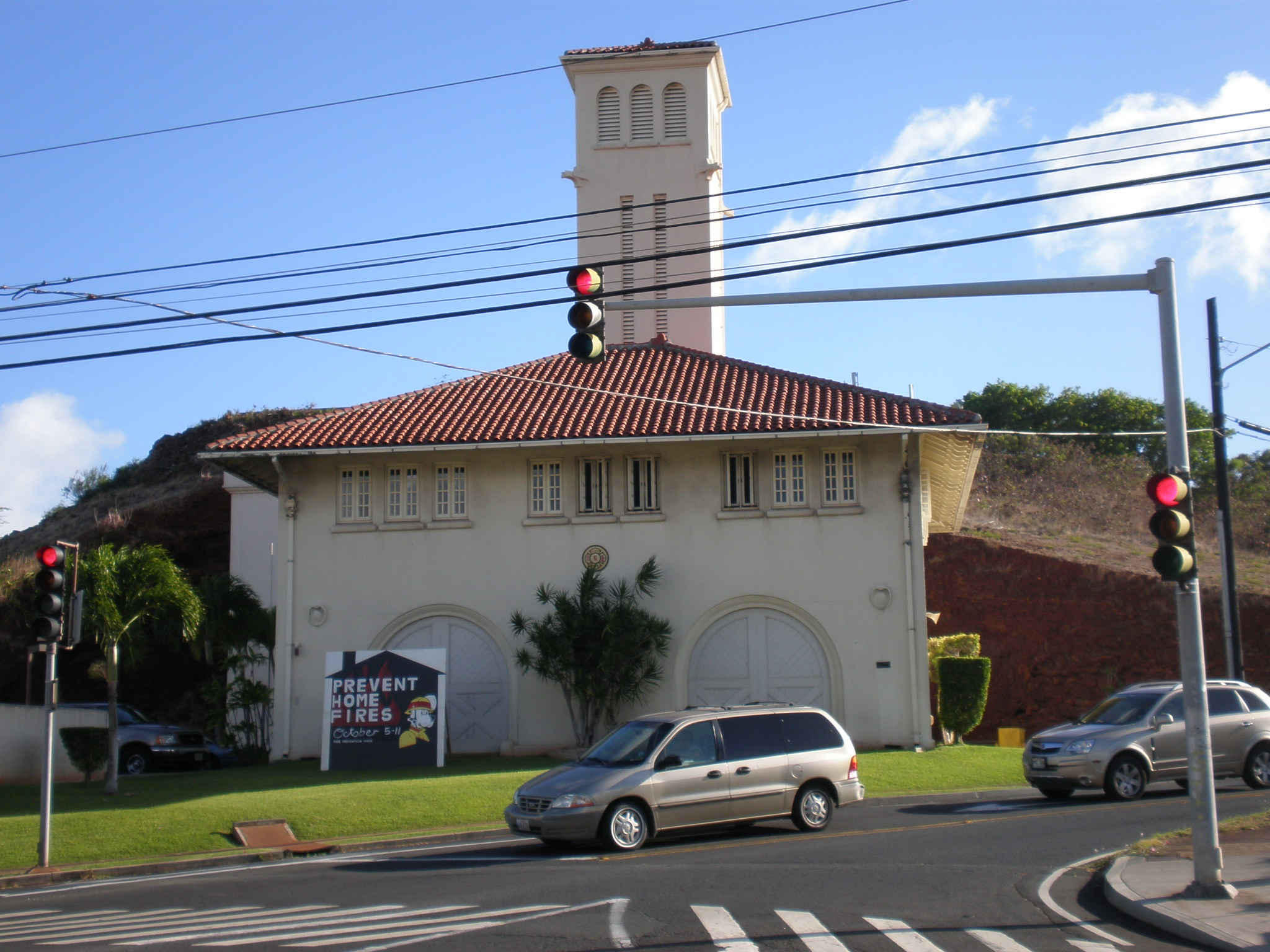
- Kaimuki Fire Station (2008).
- Location: Kaimukī, Hawaii
- Built: 1924
- Architectural style: Mediterranean Revival
- NRHP reference No.: 80001276
- Added to NRHP: December 2, 1980

The Kaimuki Fire Station is one of the seven Fire Stations of Oahu listed on the National Register of Historic Places since 1980. It is located at 971 Koko Head Avenue, in Kaimukī, Hawaii.

== Description ==
The building was designed by G. R. Miller (one of the designers of the Honolulu City Hall), who also designed the Kalihi Fire Station that was erected the same year (1924) and with very similar features. The reinforced concrete building was built against an old water reservoir. The campanile is actually a hose tower. The top is a red-tiled hipped roof. It has been described as a "miniature shield volcano".

The fire station includes a stucco-facade, rectangular building on its left that was built in 1931 but not included in the 1980 National Registry.

A plan to build a new separate building for the fire station was rejected in 1992.

An ancestral water tank previously filled by two artesian wells is adjacent to the fire station.

== See also ==
- Fire Stations of Oahu
