= Farrington-Kaiser-Kalani Complex Area =

School district in Hawaii, United States

Location
- Honolulu, Hawaii; United States

District information
- Grades: PK-12
- Established: 22 January 2002
- Superintendent: Donna Kagawa
- Accreditation: Western Association of Schools and Colleges
- Schools: 28

Students and staff
- Athletic conference: OIA East

The Farrington-Kaiser-Kalani Complex Area is one of 15 Hawaii Department of Education complex areas in the state of Hawaii, USA. It is part of the Honolulu District and comprises 1 community school, 3 high schools, 4 middle schools, 18 elementary schools, 1 public charter school, and 1 special school.

The current complex superintendent is Donna Kagawa.

== Community Schools ==
School name	Area
Farrington Community School	Kalihi

== High school ==
School name	Mascot	Area	Enrollment	School-Teacher Ratio
Farrington High School	Governors	Kalihi	2530	16
Kaiser High School	Cougars	Hawaii Kai	979	18
Kalani High School	Falcons	Kahala	1125	15

== Other Complex Areas ==
=== Honolulu District ===
Kaimuki-McKinley-Roosevelt Complex Area
