= Hawaii State Student Council =

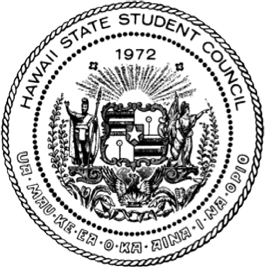
- Hawaii State Student Council Seal
- Abbreviation: HSSC
- Legal status: Association
- Purpose: Legislative
- Headquarters: Office of Curriculum, Instruction, and Student Support
- Location: Honolulu
- Region served: State of Hawaii
- Members: 42 elected representatives from each of Hawaii's public high schools
- Affiliations: National Association of Student Councils
- Website: https://hssc808.wordpress.com/

The Hawaii State Student Council, commonly known as HSSC, currently consists of 44 students; one student representing each of Hawaii's forty-three public high schools, and one student member on the Hawaii State Board of Education (BOE).

The BOE student member is a non-voting member that attends BOE meetings and solicits inputs on policy decisions from the HSSC and students throughout the state, encouraging them to express their concerns.

The State Advisor serves as the counselor of the council and is the bond between the Hawai'i Department of Education and the HSSC. The Advisor also serves as the advisor to the planners of the Secondary Student Conference (SSC).

The HSSC also works closely with the SSC Planning Committee to address youth concerns to the State Legislature, Board of Education, and other recommending bodies. The SSC Planning Committee plans an annual mock legislative experience for public and private secondary schools.

The HSSC started in 1972 with seven members.

== Council structure ==
The Hawaii State Student Council is structured by its Constitution and Bylaws which both receive annual review. The Council, as established in the Bylaws, uses the interactive method as well as Robert's Rules of Order for parliamentary authority.

=== Officers ===
The officers of the Council include the following:

1. Chairperson: The responsibilities of the chairperson are to: preside over all meetings of the Council, keep in close contact with all members of the Council, prepare an agenda and accompanying memorandum for HSSC members and affiliates before each HSSC meeting, appoint members of the Council to serve as chairpersons of committees with the assistance of the HSSC Vice Chairperson, the HSSC Secretary, and the HSSC advisor, and upon approval or consent of the Council, appoint members of the Council to serve as members of committees with the assistance of the respective committee chairperson(s) and the HSSC advisor, and upon approval or consent of the Council, appoint members of the Council to affiliate positions as representatives to other groups, upon approval or consent of the Council, and carry out all other duties as stated in Robert’s Rules of Order, Revised, except that he/she shall vote and engage in debate.
2. Vice Chairperson: The responsibilities of the vice chairperson are to: assume the duties and responsibilities of the Chairperson in the absence of that officer or upon the Chairperson’s removal or resignation from office, serve as the Sergeant-at-Arms, serve as the unofficial Parliamentarian of the Council, accept all responsibilities accorded to him/her by the Chairperson, be responsible for the performance of all committees, and assist the Chairperson with all communications within and outside of the Council.
3. Secretary: The responsibilities of the secretary are to: be responsible for the publication of all HSSC meeting minutes within two (2) weeks of each HSSC meeting with distribution to all HSSC members, be responsible for the correspondence of the Council with school, and/or state councils, designate a member of the Council to act as Secretary in the Secretary’s absence, and maintain and keep all documents pertaining to the Council (record keeping).

=== Committees ===
The Council has five standing committees

1. Executive Committee: Consisting of the HSSC Chairperson, Vice Chairperson, Secretary, Four Standing Committee Student Chairpersons, BOE Student Representative, and State Program Advisor. The Executive Committee will assist the Chairperson and Vice Chairperson to organize and facilitate all business of HSSC; meet prior to BOE Meetings to give input on the BOE Student Representative reports; meet as needed to conduct Executive Committee business; and organize the annual selection process of the BOE Student Representative.
2. Student Achievement Committee: The committee will collect information; analyze information; discuss information; and make recommendations for action to the BOE, DOE, and other policy makers (as needed) to promote student achievement.
3. Co-Curricular Concerns Committee: The committee will collect information related to all co-curricular activities, including athletics; analyze information; discuss information; and make recommendations for action to the BOE, DOE, and other policy makers (as needed) to support an optimal learning environment for students.
4. Communications Committee: The committee will facilitate communications from the students to the BOE, DOE, and other policy making bodies and vice versa. The committee will also be responsible for managing all HSSC Internet Sites and publications.
5. School Environment Committee will collect information related to the school physical, social and emotional school environment; analyze information; discuss information; and make recommendations for action to the BOE, DOE, and other policy makers (as needed) to support an optimal learning environment for students.
