= Hawaii State Department of Education =

State education agency

Coordinates: 21°18′34″N 157°51′19″W

- 1390 Miller Street Honolulu, HI, 96813

District information
- Grades: K-12
- Established: 1840
- Superintendent: Keith Hayashi

Students and staff
- Students: 167,649 (2023-2024)
- Teachers: ~13,000 teachers

Other information
- Website: hawaiipublicschools.org

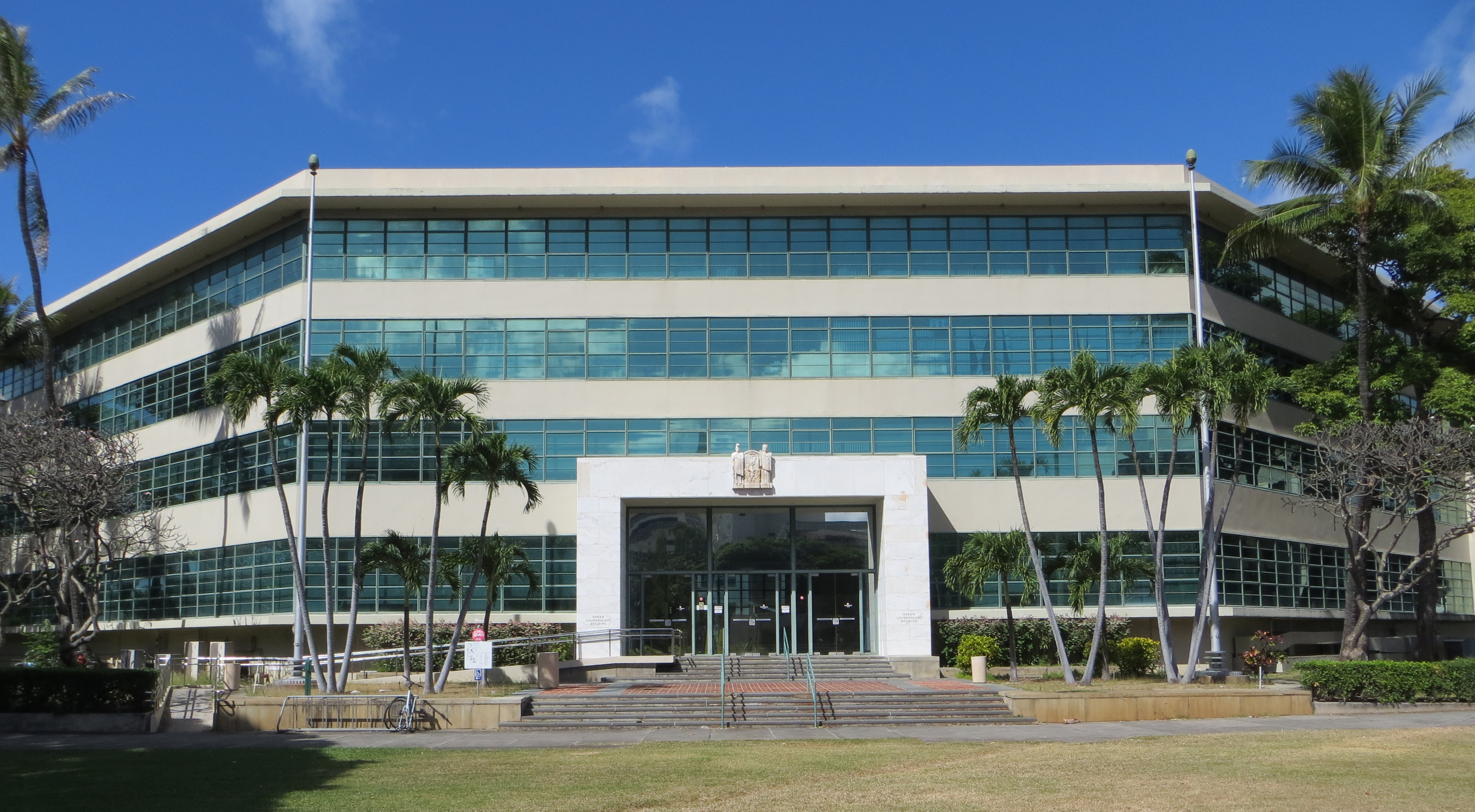
Queen Liliuokalani Building, 1390 Miller St, Honolulu, HI 96813

The Hawaii State Department of Education (HIDOE, Hawaiian: Ka ʻOihana Hoʻonaʻauao o ke Aupuni Hawaiʻi) is a statewide public education system in the United States. The school district can be thought of as analogous to the school districts of other cities and communities in the United States, but in some manners can also be thought of as analogous to the state education agencies of other states. As the official state education agency, the Hawaiʻi State Department of Education oversees all 258 public schools and 37 charter schools and over 13,000 teachers in the State of Hawaiʻi, serving approximately 167,649 students statewide (School Year 2023-24). The U.S. Census Bureau classifies this as a "dependent school system", that is dependent on the Hawaiian state government.

The HIDOE is currently headed by Superintendent Keith Hayashi (since July 1, 2022). The department is headquartered in the Queen Liliuokalani Building in Honolulu CDP, City and County of Honolulu on the island of Oahu.

Hawaii is the only state in the nation that does not use property tax revenue to fund public education; instead, most of HIDOE's budget is funded from the state general fund which includes revenue from the general excise tax and income taxes. Hawaii's overall level of property tax is the lowest nationwide. There was a previous law that allowed for locally operated government schools, but this law was rescinded. The term "school districts" in Hawaii is instead used to refer to internal divisions within HIDOE, and the U.S. Census Bureau does not count these as local governments.

== History ==
King Kamehameha III established Hawaii's first public education system on October 15, 1840. This makes the Hawaiʻi State Department of Education the oldest school system in the US west of the Mississippi River, and the only system established by a sovereign monarch. This date denotes when the constitution came into effect, codifying the new ministry of education. The regent of Kamehameha III, Queen Emma, had ordered the establishment of free public schools in all districts in 1834 and this was done by 1836.

In October 2009, the Hawaiʻi Department of Education agreed to a furlough program for Hawaiʻi's public schools that reduced the number of instructional days by 17 days to a total of 163 days. This is the smallest number of instructional days anywhere in the United States.

== Board of education ==
The Board of Education is a school board which votes on matters related to public education. Members are appointed by the governor of Hawaii with the advice and consent of the Hawaii State Senate, which is in contrast to most other school districts in the United States which are directly elected. Hawaii previously had an elected school board from 1966 until 2010 when voters decided to switch back to an appointed state school board. Members are appointed for three-year terms for a maximum of three terms.

The Board of Education is empowered by the State Constitution (Article X, Section 3) to formulate statewide education policy. The Board also has the power to appoint the Superintendent of Education, the State Librarian, and members of the State Public Charter School Commission.

There are nine voting members:

- 1 Chairperson, At-Large
- 2 Members, At-Large
- 3 Members, City and County of Honolulu
- 1 Member, Hawai'i County
- 1 Member, Kaua'i County
- 1 Member, Maui County

The board also includes a non-voting public high school student member and a non-voting military representative, for a total of eleven members.

== Academics ==
As of 2025, the Hawaii State Department of Education has benchmarks and standards for its schools, which include Common Core for English and mathematics, and Next Generation Science Standards for science. A law was proposed to create a statewide curriculum, the first of its kind in Hawaii, but it did not pass during the 2006 legislative session.

Per the Board of Education, public schools in Hawaii require a total of 24 credits to graduate. This includes four credits in English, four credits in Social Studies, three credits in Science, three credits in social studies, two credits in either a fine arts, foreign language, or Career and Technical Education program, one credit in physical education, half a credit in health, and half a credit in a Personal Transition Plan (PTP).

=== Personal Transition Plan ===
In the 2006–2007 school year, the Hawaii State Department of Education implemented a personal transition requirement for students, which requires the completion of a post-high school graduation plan. Students must also meet specific prerequisites at each high school grade level. The personal transition plan is implemented in various ways across schools, including advisory periods, checklists, and web-based career programs. The program uses the Career and Technical Education model as a benchmark.

=== Learning Centers ===
The department offers learning centers for students, which are afterschool programs dedicated to a particular area of study. Learning centers are similar to magnet schools, in which they allow students with similar interests to congregate. Learning centers vary from school to school, and include themes such as agriculture, STEM, business, and performing arts.

== Debates ==
=== School reform ===
Probably the most current and controversial debate over Hawaiʻi school reform has to do with the structure of the State Department of Education: specifically, whether it should remain centralized or be broken into smaller districts. The main rationale usually given for the current centralized model is equity in distribution of resources: all schools are theoretically funded from the same pool of money on an equitable basis. (Most schools on the U.S. Mainland are organized into school districts funded from local property taxes; thus, more affluent school districts theoretically receive more money and resources than less affluent areas.) Supporters of decentralization see it as a means of moving decision-making closer to the classroom, and thus achieving better student performance.

The debate divides roughly along party lines, with Republicans generally supporting decentralization and the Democrats supporting the centralized status quo. In 2002, Republican Governor Linda Lingle ran on a campaign to reorganize the Hawaiʻi State Department of Education into smaller school districts that were localed modeled after a system found in Canada. The Democrat-controlled Hawaiʻi State Legislature, however, voted not to enact this plan in 2003 and 2004.

== Structure ==
The department serves as the sole school district for the entire State of Hawaii. In 2012, the "school districts" in Hawaii were divisions of the HIDOE. The U.S. Census Bureau did not consider those "school districts" separate governments.

As of 2023 HIDOE is divided into 15 complex areas, each consisting of two to four complexes. Each complex area has a superintendent and is composed of complexes that include high schools and their feeder elementary and middle schools. The complex areas are as follows:

- Honolulu District:
  - Farrington-Kaiser-Kalani Complex Area
  - Kaimuki-McKinley-Roosevelt Complex Area
- Central District:
  - Aiea-Moanalua-Radford Complex Area
  - Leilehua-Mililani-Waialua Complex Area
- Leeward District:
  - Campbell-Kapolei Complex Area
  - Pearl City-Waipahu Complex Area
  - Nanakuli-Waianae Complex Area
- Windward District:
  - Castle-Kahuku Complex Area
  - Kailua-Kalaheo Complex Area
- Hawaii District:
  - Hilo-Waiakea Complex Area
  - Kau-Keaau-Pahoa Complex Area
  - Honokaa-Kealakehe-Kohala-Konawaena Complex Area
- Maui District:
  - Baldwin-Kekaulike-Kulanihakoi-Maui Complex Area
  - Hana-Lahainaluna-Lanai-Molokai Complex Area
- Kauai District:
  - Kapaa-Kauai-Waimea Complex Area

== Schools ==
=== Public high schools ===
City	Schools
Honolulu CDP	8
Greater Oʻahu	15
Niʻihau	1
Kauaʻi	3
Molokaʻi	1
Lānaʻi	1
Maui	5
Big Island	11

=== Public middle schools ===
City	Schools
Honolulu CDP	24
Greater Oʻahu	17
Niʻihau	1
Kauaʻi	3
Molokaʻi	1
Lānaʻi	1
Maui	6
Big Island	18

=== Public elementary schools ===
City	Schools
Honolulu CDP	55
Greater Oʻahu	76
Niʻihau	1
Kauaʻi	13
Molokaʻi	4
Lānaʻi	1
Maui	17
Big Island	37

== See also ==
- State education agency
- Hawaii State Student Council
