= Honolulu Fire Department =

Fire department in Honolulu, Hawaii

Operational area
- Country: United States
- State: Hawaii
- County: Honolulu

Agency overview
- Established: December 27, 1850
- Employees: 1,100
- Staffing: Career
- Fire chief: Sheldon K. Hao
- IAFF: 1463
- Motto: "Pride, Service, Dedication"

Facilities and equipment
- Battalions: 5
- Stations: 44
- Engines: 43
- Tillers: 8
- Platforms: 2
- Quints: 6
- Rescues: 2
- Tenders: 1
- HAZMAT: 2
- Helicopters: 4

Website
- Official website
- IAFF Website

The Honolulu Fire Department (HFD) provides fire protection and first responder emergency medical services to the City & County of Honolulu, Hawaii, United States, under the jurisdiction of the Mayor of Honolulu. Founded on December 27, 1850, by Kamehameha III and Alexander Cartwright, the Honolulu Fire Department serves and protects the entire island of O'ahu, covering over 600 square miles (1,600 km^{2}) of territory, home to more than 880,000 residents and over 4 million annual visitors.

The HFD is one of just a handful of fire departments in the nation that is Nationally accredited. The Commission on Fire Accreditation International (CFAI) confers Accredited Agency status for a period of five years.

== History ==
In the early 1800s, with an influx of missionaries, whalers, and businessmen to Hawai'i, Honolulu grew rapidly with western-style wooden buildings, which were highly combustible. Interior lighting in that period consisted of all flame-emitting equipment (candles, lamps, and lanterns); therefore fires became common in homes and businesses. On October 24, 1850, a public assembly raised the concern of the people to have adequate fire protection; and an outcome of this meeting was the formation of Honolulu's first Volunteer Fire Brigade, on November 6, 1850. The HFD holds the distinction of being the first fire department in all of the Hawaiian Islands.

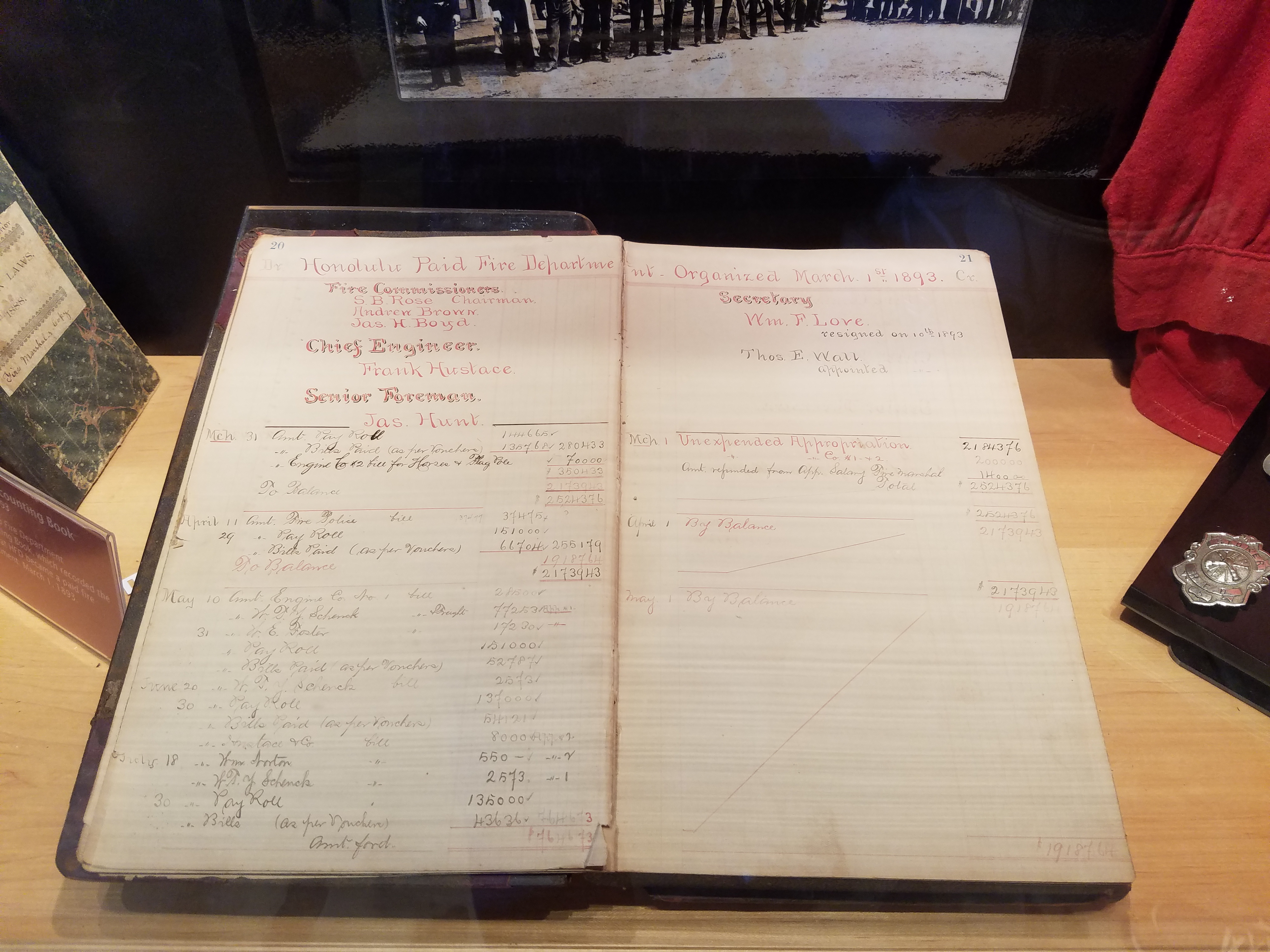
1892-1893 HFD Accountant book, which recorded the date that HFD became a paid fire department, March 1, 1893.

=== Establishment of the HFD ===
On December 27, 1850, an ordinance issued by Kamehameha III established the Honolulu Fire Department. On February 3, 1851, Oahu Governor Kekuanaoa appointed Alexander Joy Cartwright Jr. to be Chief Engineer of the Fire Department of the City of Honolulu, making him the first Fire Engineer of the newly formed department. The ordinance was enacted into law by the Hawaiian Legislature of 1851 (S.S. 1851, pp. 5-ll), becoming effective on May 8, 1851, after it was signed by the Speaker of the House of Representatives, William L. Lee, and King Kamehameha.

The HFD is also the only fire department in the United States that was established by the order of the King of a Monarchy; and the department was continued by a Provisional Government, then a Republic, then a Territory, a County and lastly by a City and County Government. Honolulu, which was the Capital of the Territory of Hawaii, is believed to be the only fire department in the world that has had kings serve as active members with King Kamehameha III, who reigned during the 1850s and King David Kalakaua, during the 1880s working alongside volunteers.

==== Hawaiian Engine Company No. 4 ====
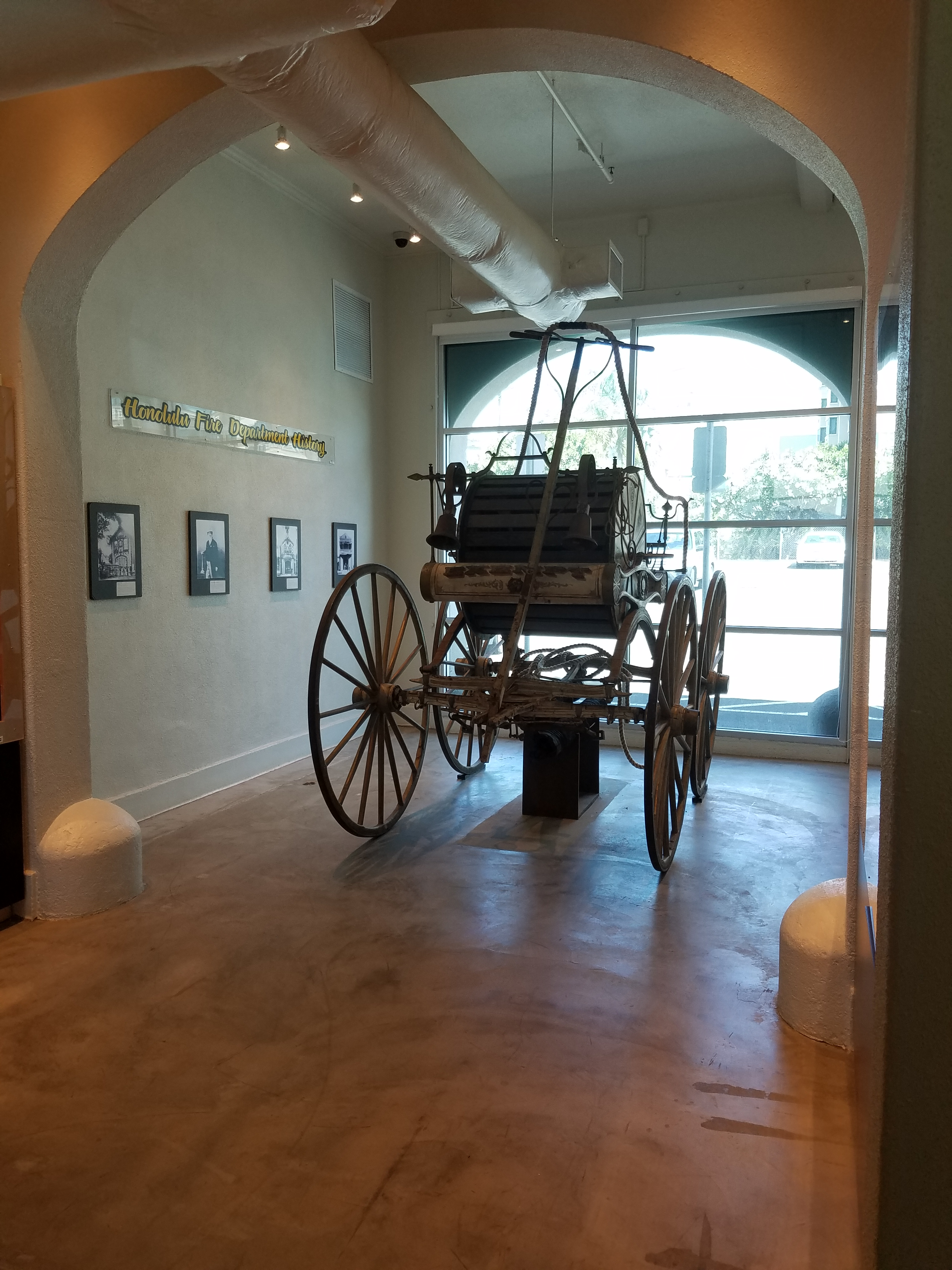
The Prairie Queen is a mid-nineteenth-century fire apparatus. It was not actually used by the HFD; it was donated to the department in 1969. But Honolulu firefighters used similar equipment in the 1800s.

King Kalākaua was a member of Engine Company No. 4, which was originally an all-Hawaiian Company established in 1861. Prince Albert Kamehameha, a toddler at the time, admired Company 4 and was made an honorary member. After his death at the age of five, the entire HFD joined his funeral procession. When King Kalākaua died in 1891, firefighters draped black fabric on their stations to show their respect for the King.

==== Chinatown Fire of 1886 ====
On April 18, 1886, a fire started in a building at Hotel and Smith streets and destroyed over 60 acres of buildings and involved a loss surpassing $1,453,000. Buildings had been constructed close together, allowing the fire to quickly spread in all directions. In response, on April 20, 1886, the Board of Fire Underwriters was formed. On May 29, 1886, King Kalākaua signed Honolulu's first building laws (building codes).

==== Chinatown Fire of 1900 ====
In an effort to control the bubonic plague, blocks of buildings were burnt, one at a time. On April 20, 1900, the block next to Kaumakapili Church was set on fire. As the flame grew, the wind unexpectedly changed; and the fire spread to the steeple of the church and then began to spread quickly across the city. Firefighters worked hard to control the fire that swept Chinatown, burning 38 acres. The property losses totaled over $3,000,000.

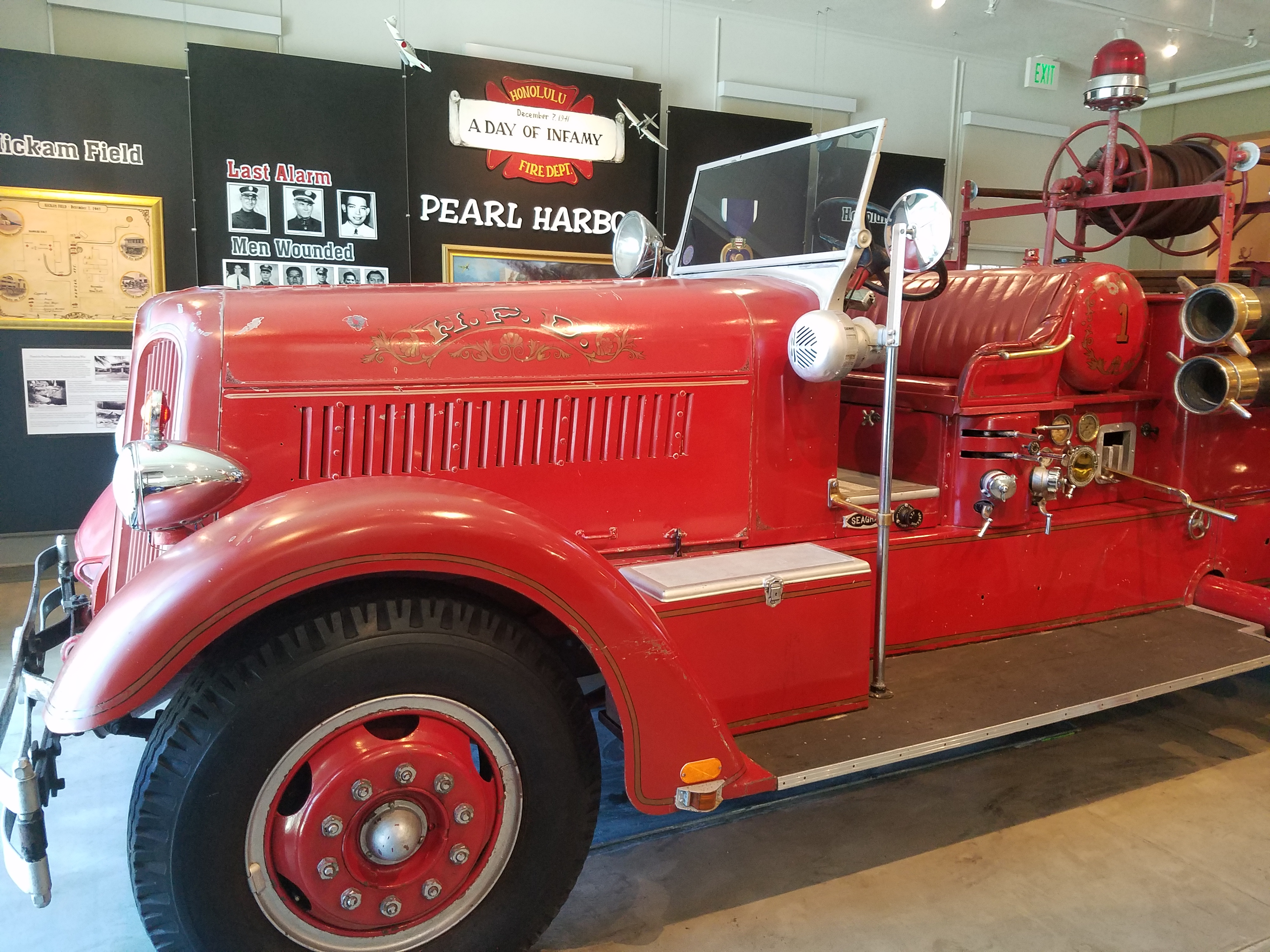
Old Engine No.1, a 1938 Seagrave, has shrapnel damage from the attacks on Hickham Field during the bombing of Pearl Harbor on December 7, 1941

=== Fire Museum ===
The Honolulu Fire Museum and Education Center is located in the former historic Kakaʻako Fire Station, built in 1928, and neighbors the HFD headquarters’ building, which was completed in 2006. The Engine Company occupied Kakaʻako Station on October 1, 1929, and the Ladder Truck Company moved on March 1, 1930. The Shop opened in 1931. Kaka’ako Fire Station was one of several HFD stations that were nominated to the National Register of Historic Places in 1980.

The museum shares the history of the HFD as well as the history of fire-fighting apparatus and gear. When the Japanese started bombing Pearl Harbor on December 7, 1941, the HFD quickly responded to the crisis. The first of three responding HFD companies arrived to find Hickam Field's fire station hit by bombs. Honolulu firefighters worked tirelessly to extinguish flames and save as many U.S. planes as possible, but the second wave of Japanese Zero aircraft approached. Hoseman Harry Tuck Lee Pang was shot and killed; Captains Thomas Macy and John Carreira died in a bomb blast. Six other firefighters were injured. The HFD lists among its members nine men who were awarded the Order of the Purple Heart, including three dead members who were awarded the medal in 1984. This made the HFD the only fire department on American soil whose members were attacked by a foreign nation and were awarded Purple Hearts relating to their duties. This honor is now only awarded to members of the Armed Forces wounded in battle.

The Honolulu Fire Museum and Education Center is open to the public one Saturday a month for free, guided tours.

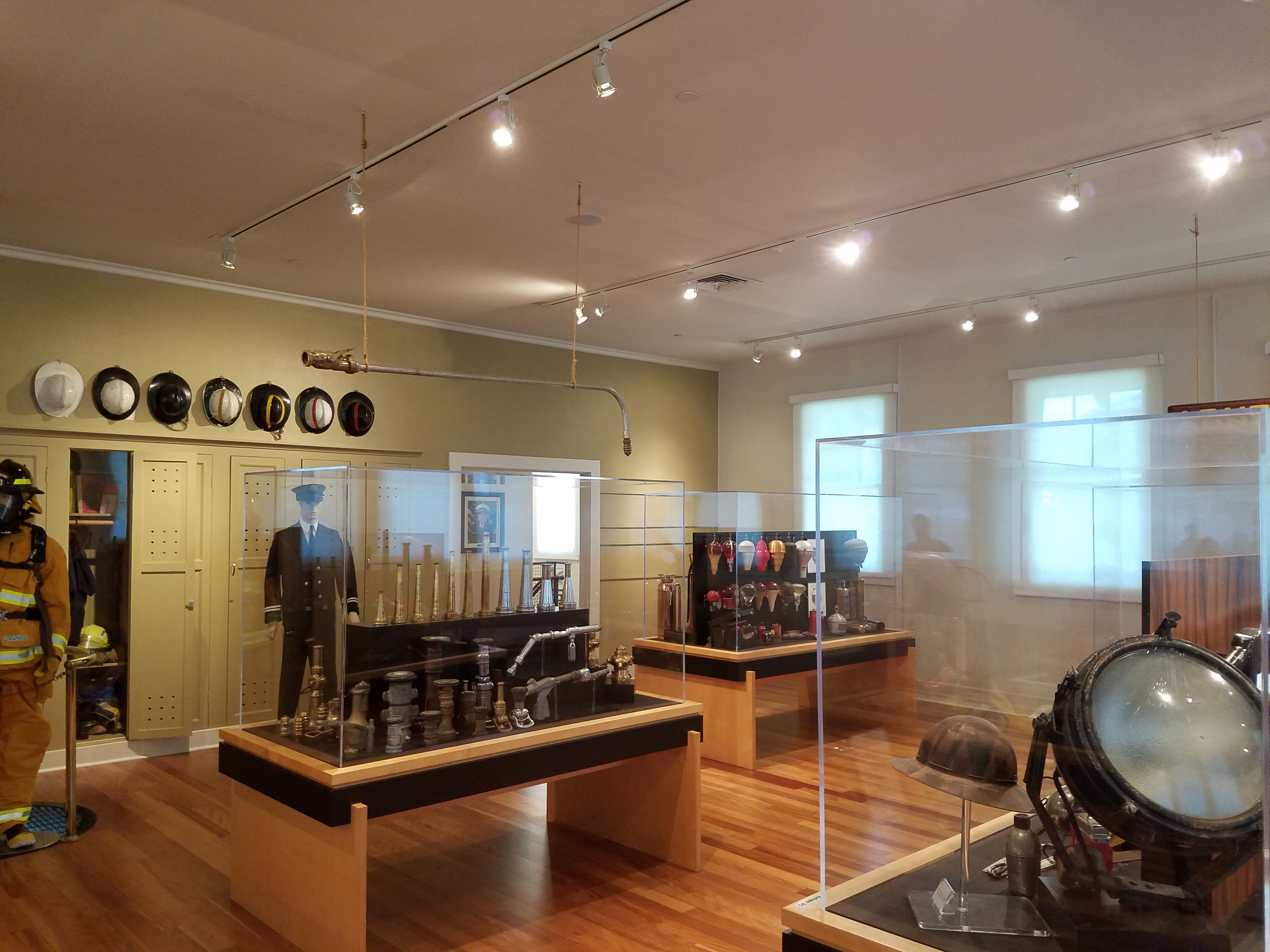
The second floor of the museum was once the dormitory of the old Kaka’ako firehouse.

== Bureaus ==
Under the Fire Commission, Fire Chief, and Deputy Chief, there are three bureaus that support the fire suppression forces (Fire Operations):

- Administrative Services Bureau
- Planning and Development
- Support Services

=== Fire Operations Bureau ===
Fire Operations accounts for the majority of the activity in the HFD. They are responsible for all emergency response for the island of Oahu and respond to fires, emergency medical calls, hazardous materials incidents, motor vehicle accidents, natural disasters, and also perform technical rescues.

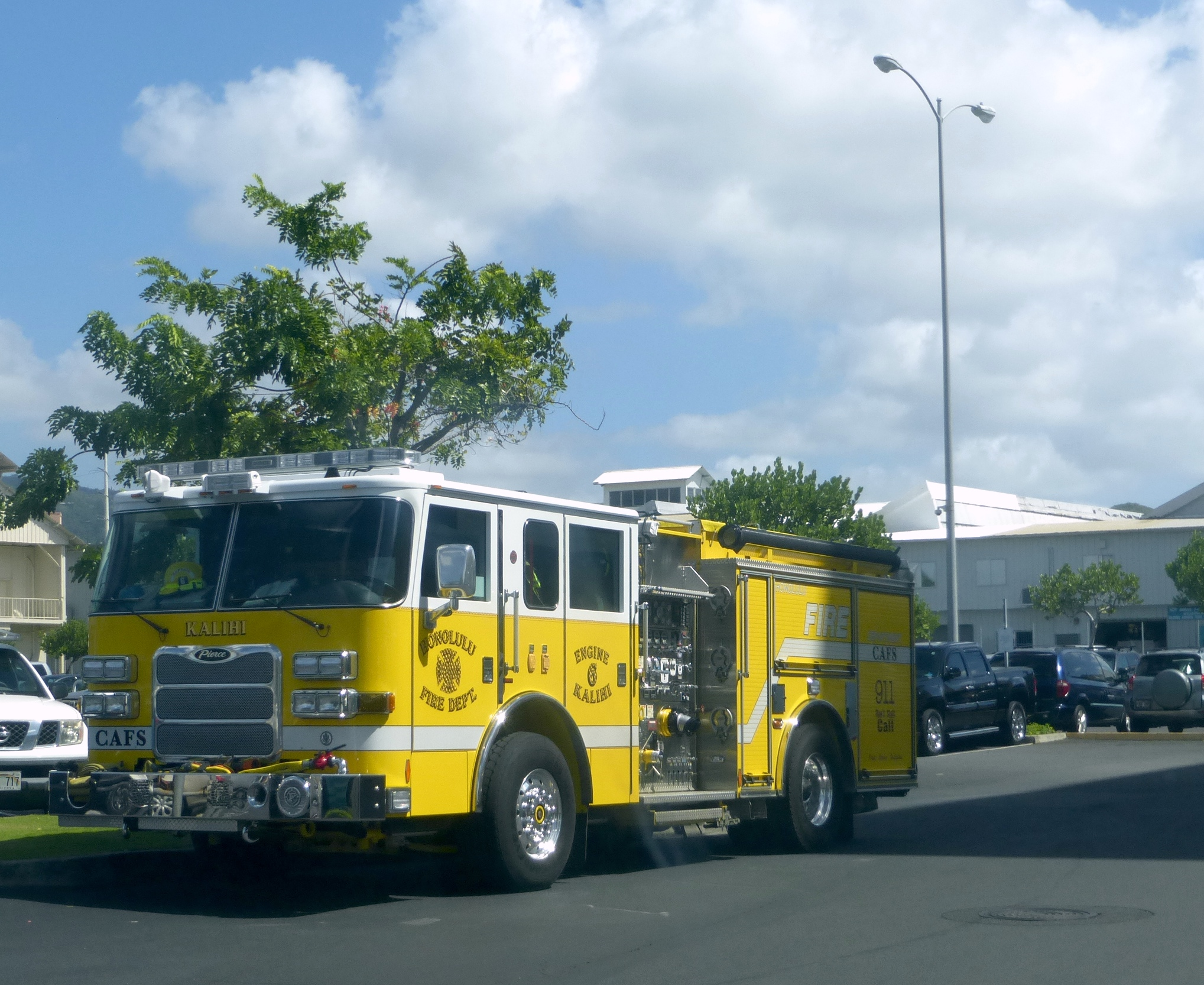
Honolulu Fire Department engine, 2015

==== Stations & Apparatus ====
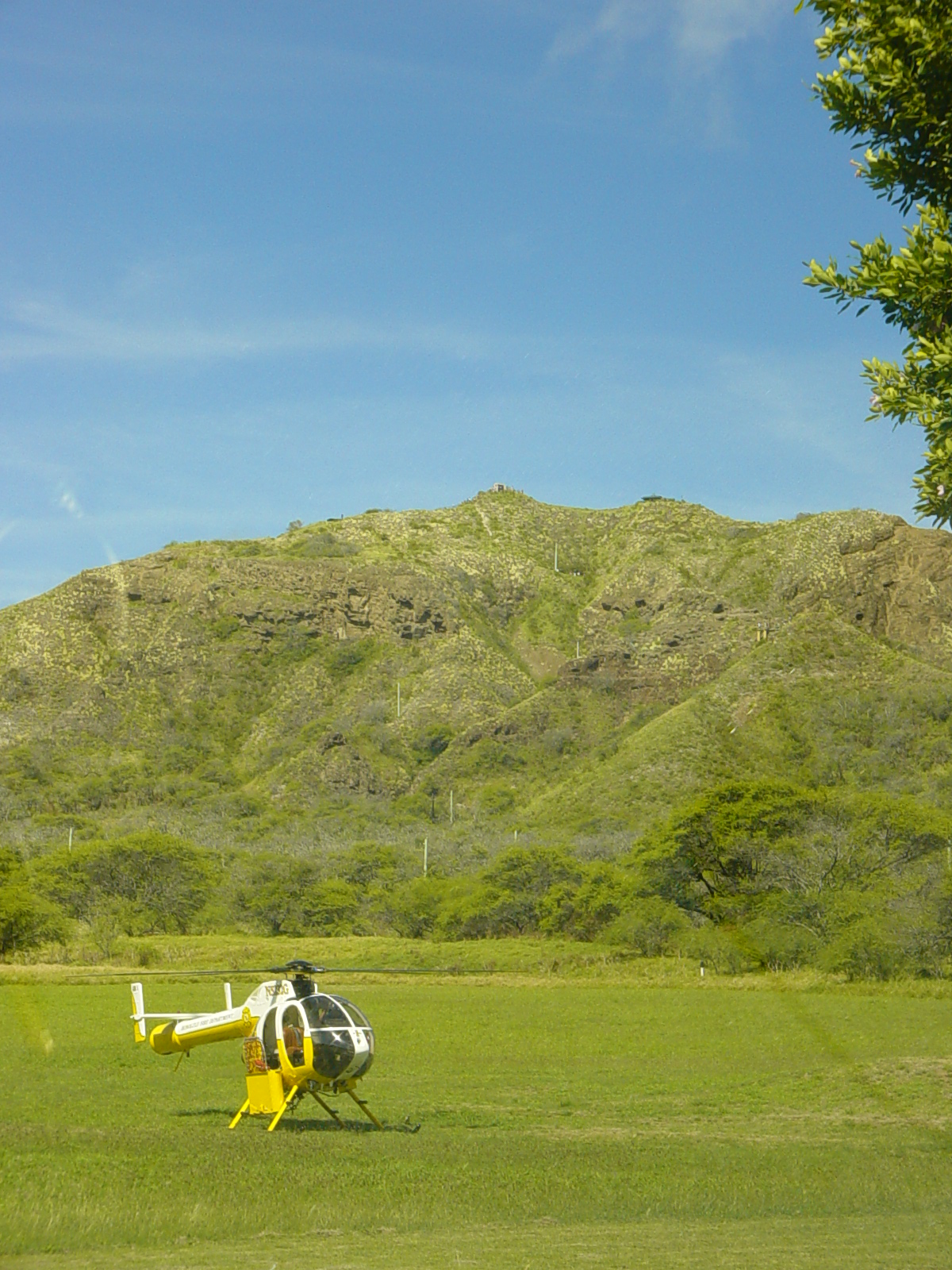
HFD helicopter in Diamond Head, 2007

Below is a complete listing of all Honolulu Fire Department fire station and apparatus locations.

There are 25 single engine companies and some trucks might be KME or Pierce Quantum or Arrow XT

fire Station Number	Neighborhood	Engine Company	Ladder Company, Quint Company, or Tower Company	Battalion Chief vehicle	Specialized Unit or Company	UTVs
1	Central	Engine 1		Battalion Chief 1		
2	Pawaa	Engine 2	Ladder 2		RRV-2, Rescue 1, SAR Boat 1 / Force 22	
3	Makiki	Engine 3				
4	Kuakini	Engine 4	Ladder 4		RRV-4	
5	Kaimuki	Engine 5	Ladder 5		RRV-5	
6	Kalihi	Engine 6				
7	Waikiki	Engine 7	Ladder 7	Battalion Chief 2	RRV 7	
8	Mokulele	Engine 8				
9	Kakaako	Engine 9	Tower 9		RRV 9	
10	Aiea	Engine 10				
11	Sunset Beach	Engine 11				
12	Waipahu	Engine 12	Quint 12		Tanker 12, RRV-12	
13	Kahuku	Engine 13				
14	Waialua	Engine 14			Brush 14	
15	Hauʻula	Engine 15			Tanker 15	
16	Wahiawa	Engine 16			Tanker 16	
17	Kaneohe	Engine 17	Ladder 17	Battalion Chief 3	RRV-17	
18	Kailua	Engine 18	Ladder 18		RRV-18	
19	Aikahi	Engine 19				
20	Pearl City	Engine 20				
21	Kaʻaʻawa	Engine 21				
22	Manoa	Engine 22				
23	Wailupe	Engine 23				
24	ʻEwa Beach	Engine 24	Quint 24		RRV-24	
25	Nu‘uanu	Engine 25				
26	Waianae	Engine 26	Quint 26		Tanker 26, RRV-26	
27	Waimānalo	Engine 27				
28	Nānākuli	Engine 28			Tanker 28	
29	McCully-Moiliili	Engine 29	Ladder 29		RRV-29	
30	Moanalua	Engine 30	Ladder 30		RRV-30	
31	Kalihi Kai	Engine 31	Quint 31		RRV-31, Rescue 2, SAR Boat 2	
32	Kalihi Uka	Engine 32			Haz-Mat. 1	
33	Palolo	Engine 33				
34	Hawaii Kai	Engine 34	Quint 34		RRV-34	
35	Makakilo	Engine 35				
36	Mililani	Engine 36				
37	Kahaluu	Engine 37				
38	Waiau	Engine 38	Quint 38		RRV-38	
39	Olomana	Engine 39				
40	Kapolei	Engine 40	Tower 40	Battalion Chief 4	RRV-40, Tanker-440, Mobile Command Center 1	UTV 4
41	Mililani Mauka	Engine 41		Battalion Chief 5	UTV 5	
42	Waikele	Engine 42			Brush 42	
43	East Kapolei	Engine 43			HazMat 2, Communications Vehicle (CV) 1, Drone 1, RRV-43	
44	Kalaeloa Airport				Air-1, Air-2, Air-3, Air 4 Tender 30	

=== Administrative Services Bureau ===
- Mechanic Shop: provides maintenance to fire apparatus, as well as police vehicles.
- Safety & Health: administers health related programs.

=== Planning and Development ===
- Fire Communication Center: this is the vital link between the public and fire suppression forces.
- Radio Shop: provides maintenance to radios and communication systems.

=== Support Services ===
Support Services manages and coordinates the Training and Research Bureau and the Fire Prevention Bureau, which also includes the Community Relations/Education section.

==== Training and Research Bureau ====
HFD accomplishes its mission largely by maintaining a well-equipped and highly trained, professional workforce of firefighters and rescue personnel. The Training and Research Bureau (TRB) conducts training for all phases of firefighting, emergency medical incidents, hazardous materials incidents, technical rescues, and professional development. TRB is located at the Charles H. Thurston Training Center in Honolulu.

==== Fire Prevention Bureau ====
The Fire Prevention Bureau (FPB) administers the fire prevention program for the City and County of Honolulu, which includes setting policies and procedures in the enforcement of fire codes and conducting fire investigations to determine the origin and cause of fires. The FPB conducts investigations as mandated by Chapter 132–4, Hawaii Revised Statutes, and has several sections:

- Administration: Issues permits and licenses.
- Code Enforcement: enforces fire codes and regulations for occupancies within the City and County.
- Plans Examining: reviews and approves building plans to ensure compliance with building codes and conduct investigations for permits.
- Support: responsible for testing of building fire protection systems.
- Fire Investigation: determines the origin, cause and circumstances of structure fires.
- Fire Education: develops and implements programs to help minimize injuries and fire losses and to reduce the dangers to first responders.

==== Community Relations ====
Community Relations/Education (CRO) is the liaison between the community and the HFD, and it coordinates ceremonies, funerals, and other events. CRO develops, coordinates, and administers fire safety and education programs promoting fire prevention and other public safety education programs. CRO manages the museum and offers fire safety classes. Class topics range from general fire safety prevention and preparedness tips, use of a fire extinguisher, understanding the common causes of fire, how to prevent fires, and what to do in case of a fire. CRO also participates in numerous fire safety education community events.

A publication the HFD produces annually is the Fire Fighter's Safety Guide (FFSG). The FFSG is now going on about 30 years since its first publication and about 100,000 copies are now distributed island wide to all schools. Students in grades pre-K through 6th grade receive them for free.

== Legal Resources ==
The City Charter of the City and County of Honolulu designates the HFD as the fire protection agency for the city. The HFD's responsibilities are to provide firefighting, rescue, emergency medical, and hazardous materials response for the entire island of Oahu.

The State Fire Code, as adopted by the State of Hawaii on August 15, 2014, pursuant to Chapter 132 of the Hawaii Revised Statutes (HRS), which adopts with modifications, the 2012 National Fire Protection Association (NFPA) 1 Fire Code, published and copyrighted by the NFPA, is amended and titled "Fire Code of the City and County of Honolulu".

The following HRS, originating from the State Fire Council, support the establishment of a fire department:

- Fire Protection within the State of Hawaii: HRS 132
- Reduced Ignition Propensity Cigarettes Law: HRS 132C
- Fireworks: HFD 132D
