= Kaimukī, Hawaii =

Neighborhood of Honolulu, Hawaii, United States

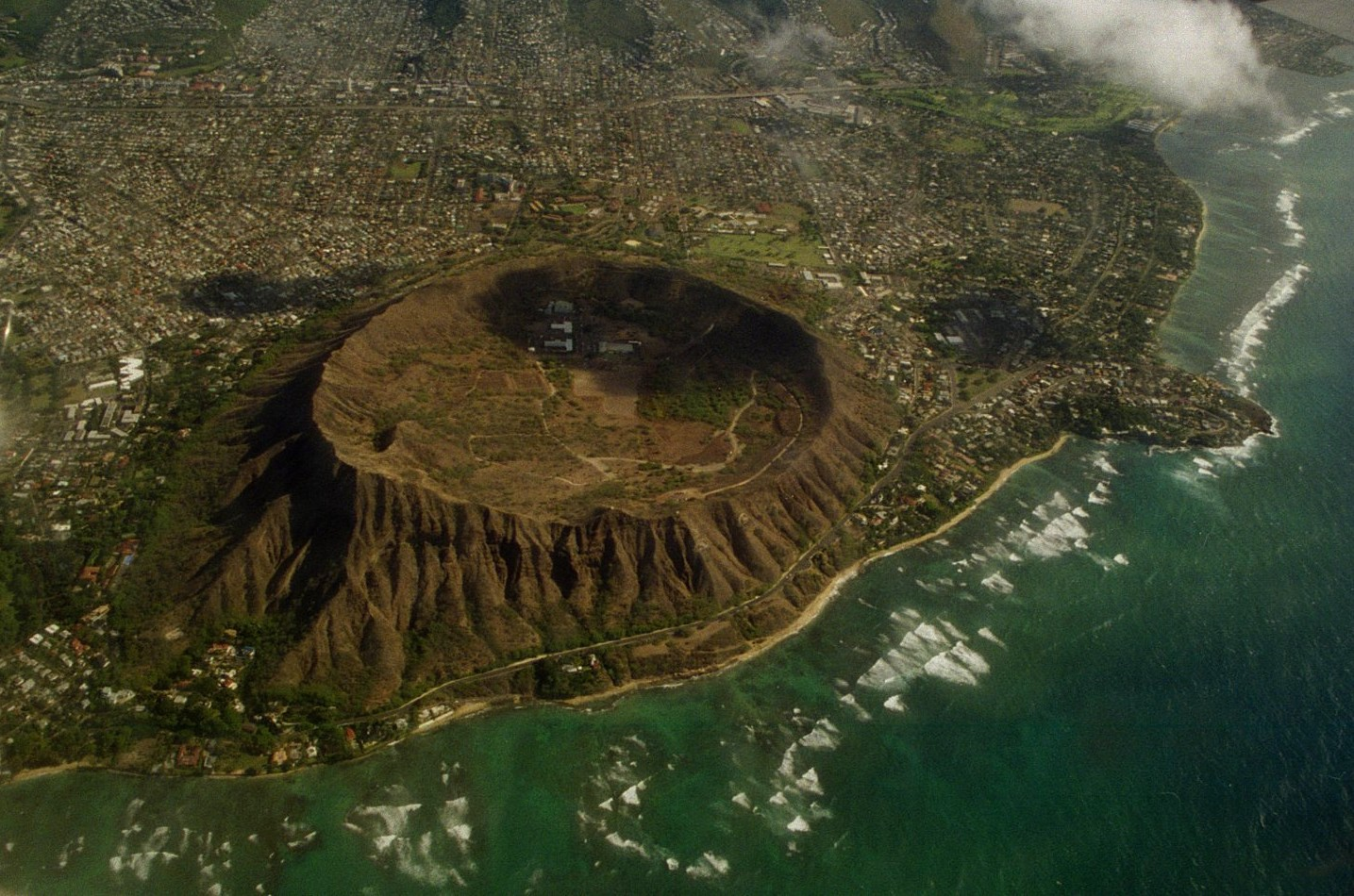
Aerial view of Diamond Head with Kaimukī to the upper left

Kaimukī is a residential neighborhood of Honolulu, Hawaii, United States.

== History ==
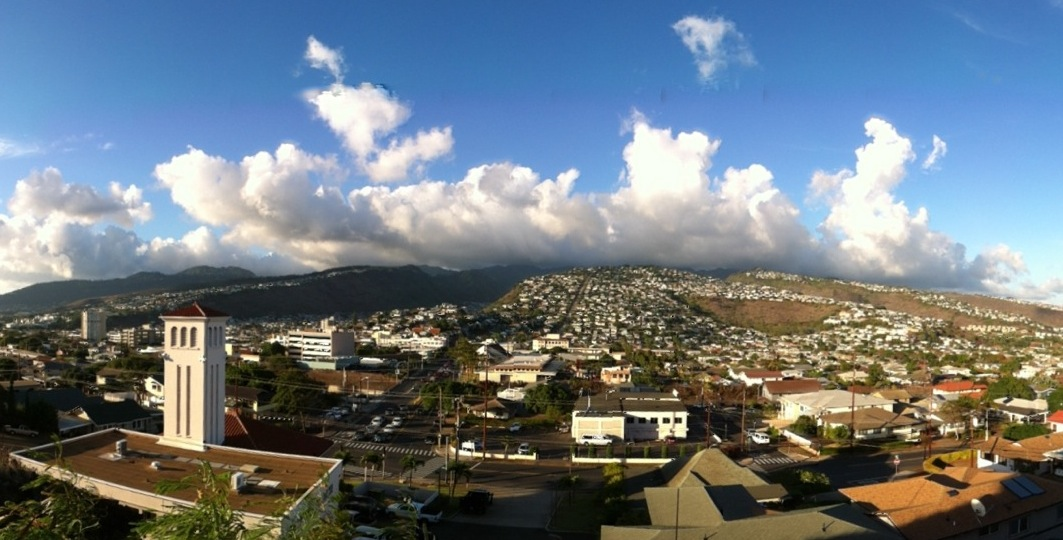
Kaimukī from Puʻu o Kaimukī Mini Park

In the 19th century, the area now known as Kaimukī was a farm of King Kalākaua's, where wild ostriches roamed over the mountain side. It later became the site of a carnation farm for funeral flowers. Kaimukī is now a mixed use area, consisting of a residential area with a small business district (mainly restaurants and service industries). It is located in the urbanized Honolulu region near Kahala and Diamond Head, Oah'u, Hawai'i.

Kaimukī is an ancient Hawaiian name. Its name comes from Ka imu kī meaning "The ti root oven" in the Hawaiian language. The area was known for the many ovens used to bake roots of kī Cordyline fruticosa, or ti, into a sweet food similar to candy.

Kaimukī's main street is Waialae Avenue, pronounced /waɪəlaɪ/. Several restaurants and stores are located on this street, as well as Kaimukī District Park.

Puʻu o Kaimukī a.k.a. “Kaimukī Hill” is the predominant feature of the area and has been a reservoir, a telegraph station, an observatory, and now a park. A metallic Christmas tree now stands on top of the hill, which is also called Menehune Hill.

== Architecture ==
The neighborhood of Kaimukī is home to historic buildings. The Kaimuki Fire Station, designed in the Spanish Mission Style by G.R. Miller, was built in 1924 and is still used as a station today. The Queen Theater, designed by Lyman Bigelow, opened in 1936 but closed in 1985.

== Education ==
Kapiʻolani Community College, one of ten branches of the public University of Hawaiʻi System, is located in Kaimukī as is the private Chaminade University.

Saint Louis School for boys and Sacred Hearts Academy for girls are located in Kaimukī as well as St. Patrick School (COED K-8). Kaimukī Christian School (COED P3-11) is located on Koko Head Avenue.

The Hawaii Japanese School - Rainbow Gakuen (ハワイレインボー学園 Hawai Rainbō Gakuen), a supplementary weekend Japanese school, holds its classes in Kaimukī Middle School in Honolulu and has its offices in another building in Honolulu.

== Notable residents ==
- Israel Kamakawiwoʻole (1959–1997), musician and singer
