= Leif Jenssen (architect) =

Norwegian-American architect (1879–1923)

- Born: February 16, 1879; Søndre Odalen Municipality, Hedmark County, Norway
- Died: 1923
- Occupation: Architect
- Known for: Designing buildings in Duluth, Minnesota, including Pilgrim Congregational Church

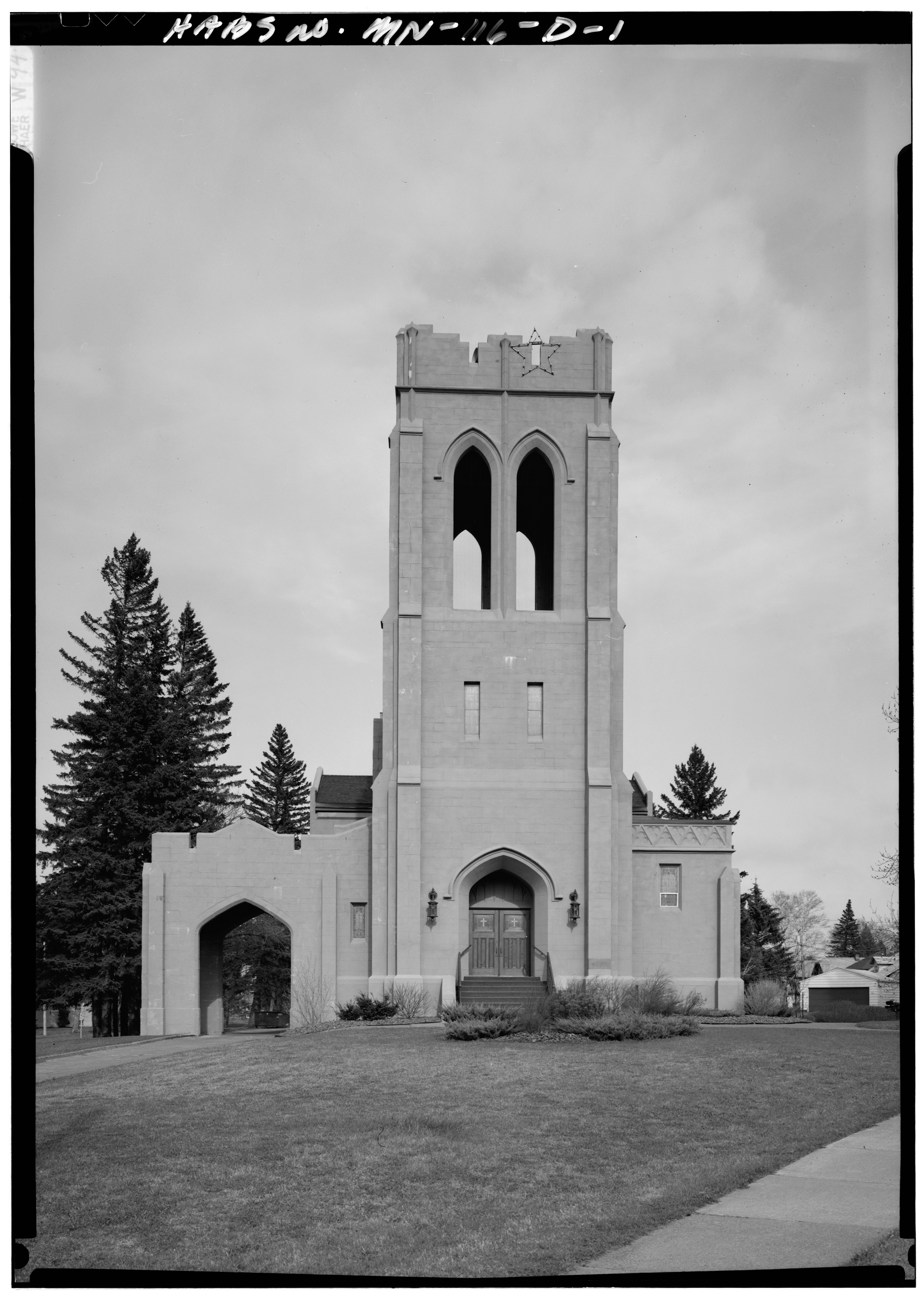
United Protestant Church, Duluth, Minnesota. Constructed 1922.

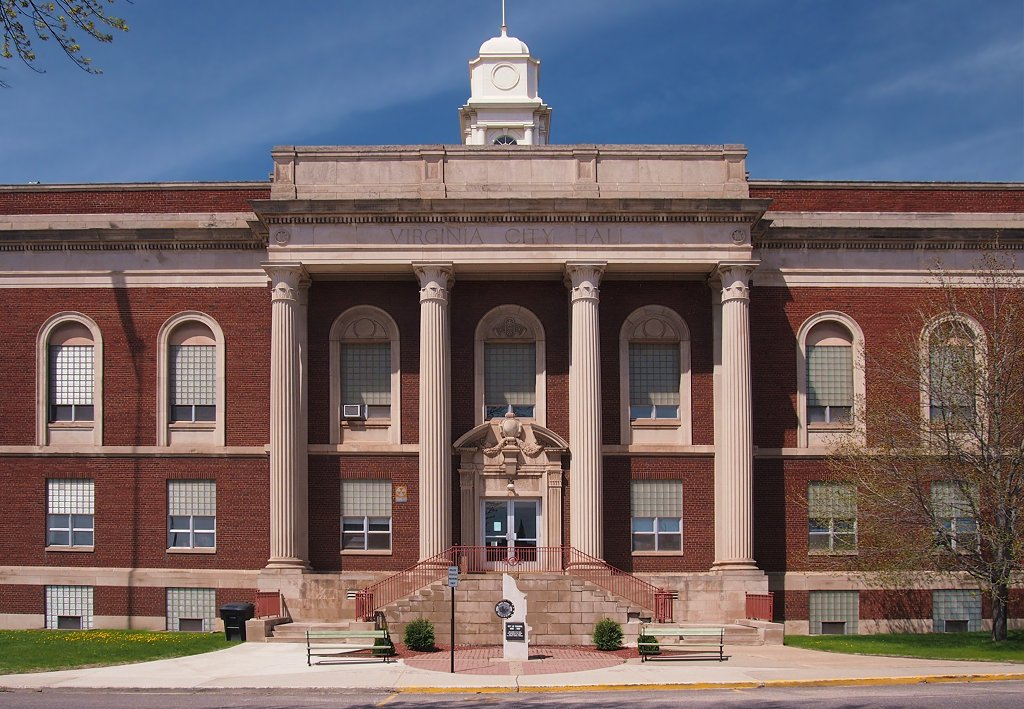
Virginia City Hall, Virginia, Minnesota. Constructed 1924.

Leif Jenssen (February 16, 1879 – 1923) was a Norwegian-American architect responsible for designing a number of buildings in Duluth, Minnesota. He is most known for designing Pilgrim Congregational Church.

== Biography ==
Jenssen was born in Søndre Odalen in Hedmark County, Norway, in 1879 to Hans Jenssen, a teacher, and Isabella Christiana Lovise née Andreassen. He had an older brother, Jens, and younger siblings Arne, Kolbjørn, Reidar, and Lorents. He grew up in Hamar. In 1895, he enrolled at Trondhjems Tekniske Læreanstalt in Trondheim, the country's leading technical school. He studied architecture, graduating in 1899. He then designed villas for the town of Hamar, including one for a tax collector named Sørsdal, located at Høyensalgata 53, in 1899, and the Trætteberg villa at Sverdrupsgata 23 in 1901. From 1899 to 1901, he worked in Oslo for the architect Michaelsen and in the city architect's office; Jenssen also designed the cell building at Grønland Police Station in Oslo at this time.

In May 1901, Jenssen emigrated to the United States, working as a draftsman for two years in New York City. He then moved to Chicago in 1903, where he married Dagney Larsen. The couple had three children.

In 1909, he moved to Duluth and worked for German & Lignell, Frederick German and Anton Werner Lignell's architectural firm. After the firm was dissolved, Jenssen started German & Jenssen in the Exchange Building and worked with German for a time, likely from 1913 until his death in 1923. Together they designed many buildings in the area. Most well known is Pilgrim Congregational Church at 2310 East 4th Street. They also designed the United Protestant Church in the Morgan Park neighborhood, Lincoln Elementary School, Superior Central High School, an addition to the Bradley Building, and a number of residences, including the Starkey House. Jenssen and German also designed the Virginia City Hall in Virginia, Minnesota; Elwin Berg was later noted as the associated architect responsible for the project.

In 1919, Jenssen became a member of the American Institute of Architects. He was also a member of the Architects' Association of Manitoba and the Duluth Engineers' Club.

Jenssen died of a stroke in 1923 at 44 years of age.
