= Cook County Courthouse (Minnesota) =

- U.S. National Register of Historic Places
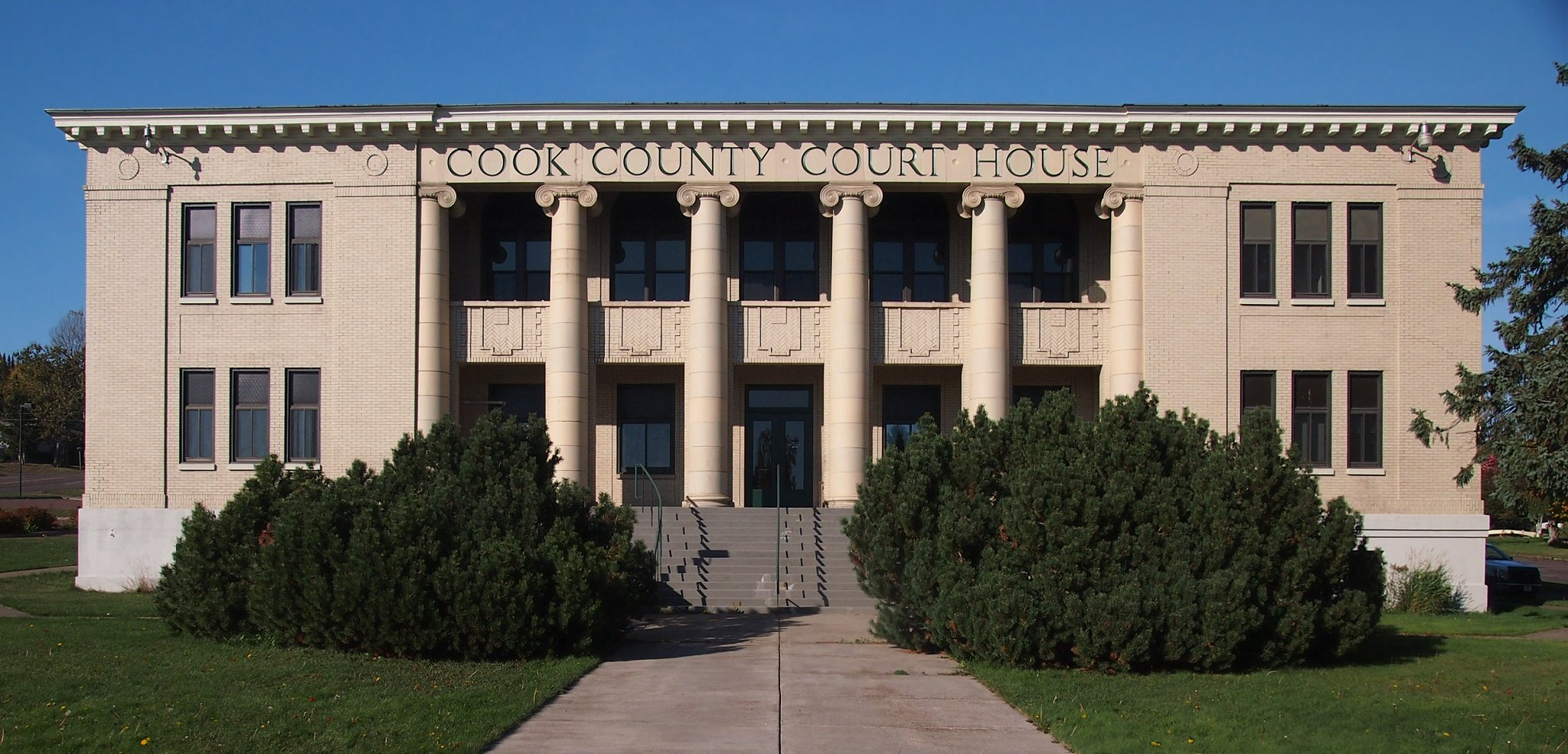
- Cook County Courthouse from the south

- Location within Minnesota Location within the United States
- Interactive map showing the location of Cook County Courthouse
- Location: 411 2nd St., Grand Marais, Minnesota
- Coordinates: 47°45′8.7″N 90°20′21.5″W
- Built: 1911
- Architect: Kelly & Lignell
- Architectural style: Classical Revival
- NRHP reference No.: 83000902
- Added to NRHP: May 09, 1983

Cook County Courthouse in Grand Marais, Minnesota, United States, was built in 1911 and designed by architects Anton Werner Lignell and Clyde Wetmore Kelly. It was listed on the National Register of Historic Places in 1983.

When Cook County was first organized, county business was conducted in a trading post on a spit of land that extended into Lake Superior. The first real courthouse building was built in 1889 and was a 24-by-30-foot (7.3 by 9.1 m) two-story frame building. It later received a one-story 20-by-32-foot (6.1 by 9.8 m) addition. The original frame courthouse was seen as "obsolete, limited in space, and far too modest an expression of the county's future," so in 1910, voters authorized the sale of bonds to build a new courthouse. The new building, completed in 1912, was built in the Classical Revival style and features Ionic columns supporting a cornice. It stands on a hill overlooking the city of Grand Marais and Lake Superior.
