= Pilgrim Congregational Church (Duluth, Minnesota) =

Church in Duluth, Minnesota

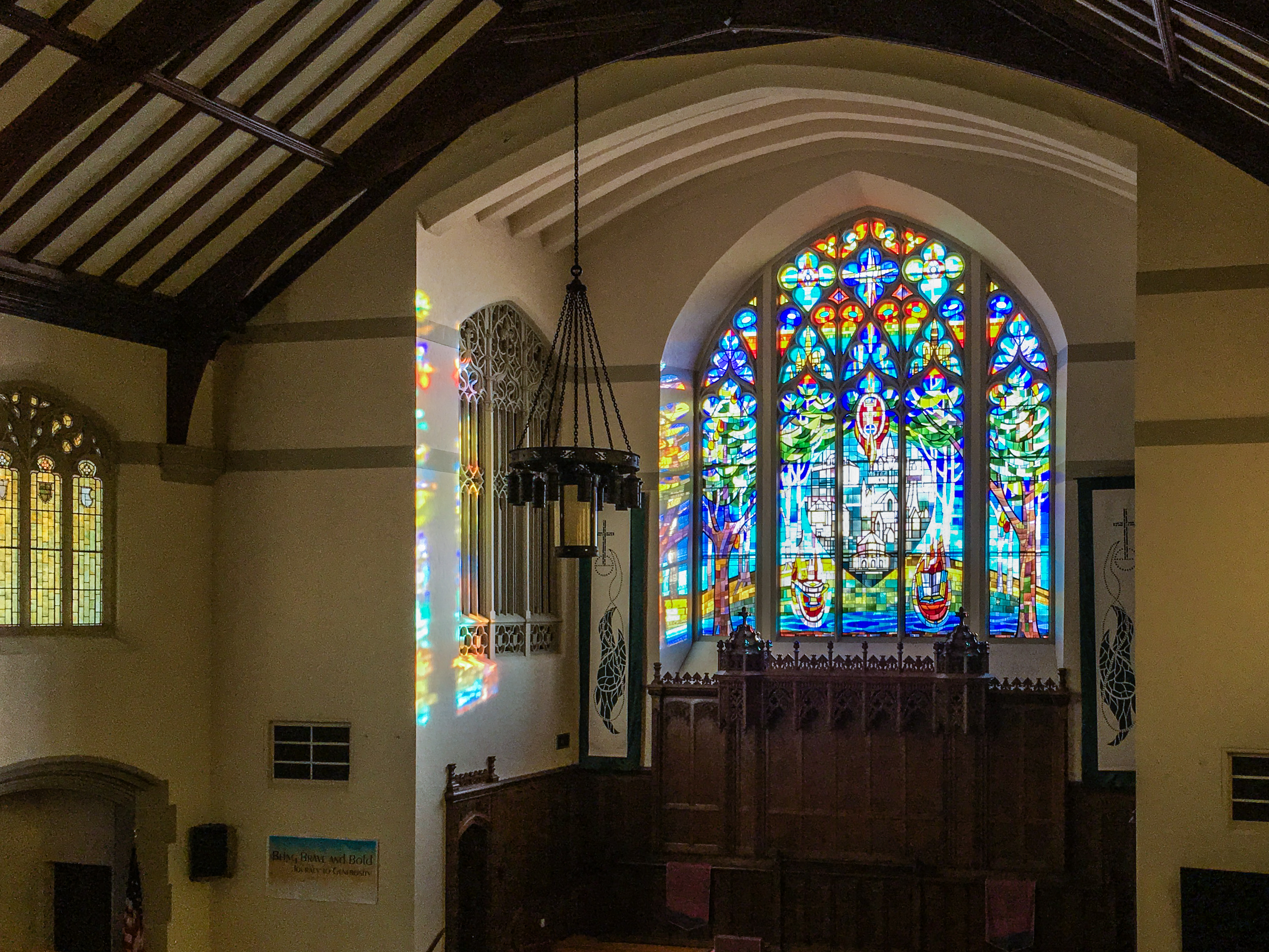

Location
- Location: Duluth
- State: Minnesota
- Country: United States
- Interactive map of Pilgrim Congregational Church
- Coordinates: 46°48′42″N 92°4′23″W

Pilgrim Congregational Church is a Congregational church in Duluth, Minnesota. The current building at 2310 East Fourth Street has English Gothic architecture.

== History ==
Major Luman H. Tenney and his wife led the foundation of the Pilgrim Congregational Church in 1870. In January 1871, Reverend Doctor Charles Cotton Salter of New Haven, Connecticut became the first pastor. The parishioners built a modest wooden structure at 2 East Second Street that was dedicated on July 16, 1871.

Pilgrim Church's second building, used from 1888 to 1915, was designed by William H. Willcox and Clarence H. Johnston Sr, also at East Second Street and Lake Avenue.

Duluth architects Frederick German and Leif Jenssen designed the current building at Fourth Street and 23rd Avenue East. The estimated cost of construction was $100,000. The first service was held at this building on September 24, 1917.

== Architecture ==
=== Stained glass windows ===
The church has five paired memorial Tiffany glass windows created by Louis Comfort Tiffany from around 1918 to 1923. Three of these bear his signature, but the other two are believed to be authentic as well.

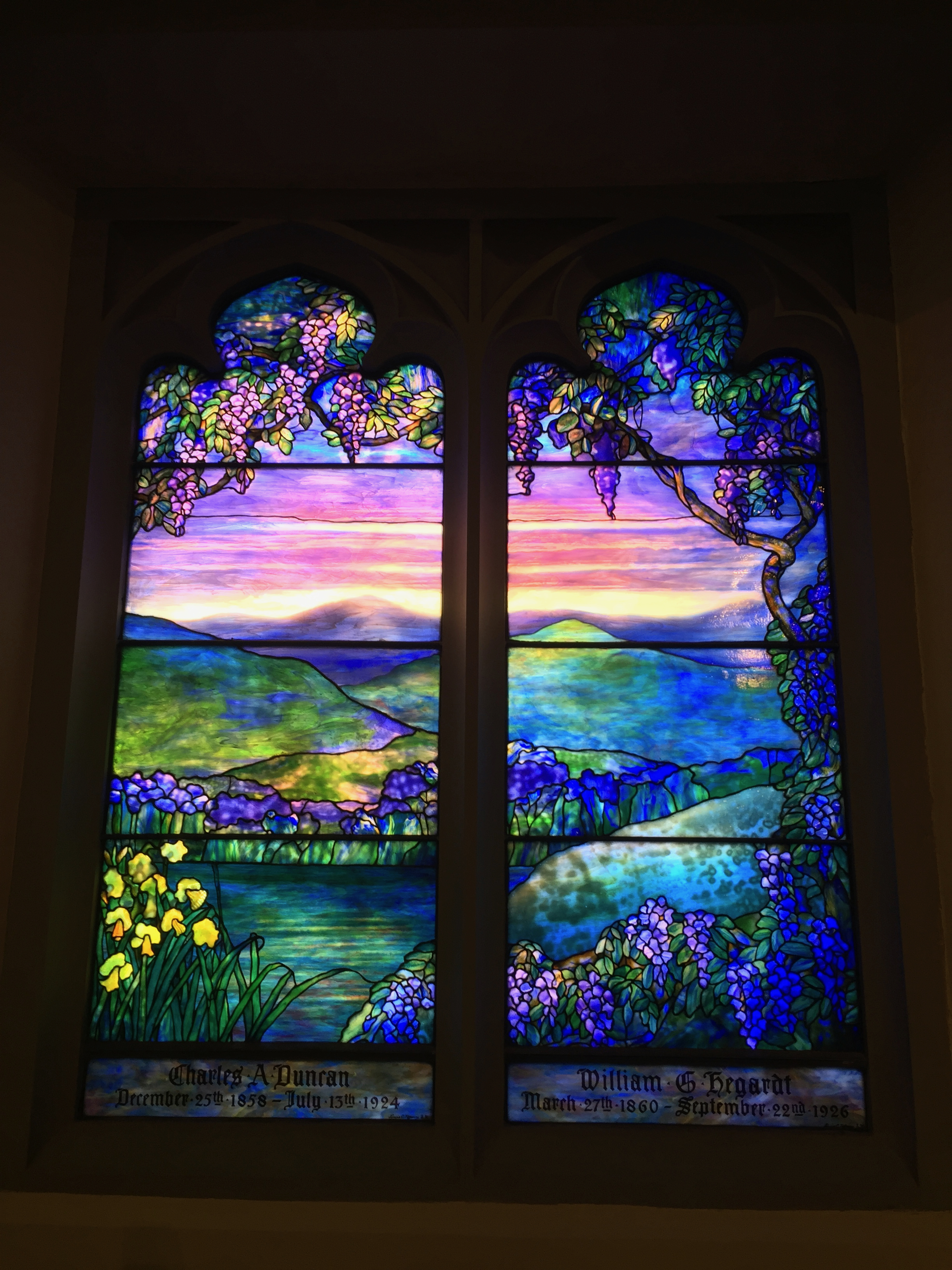

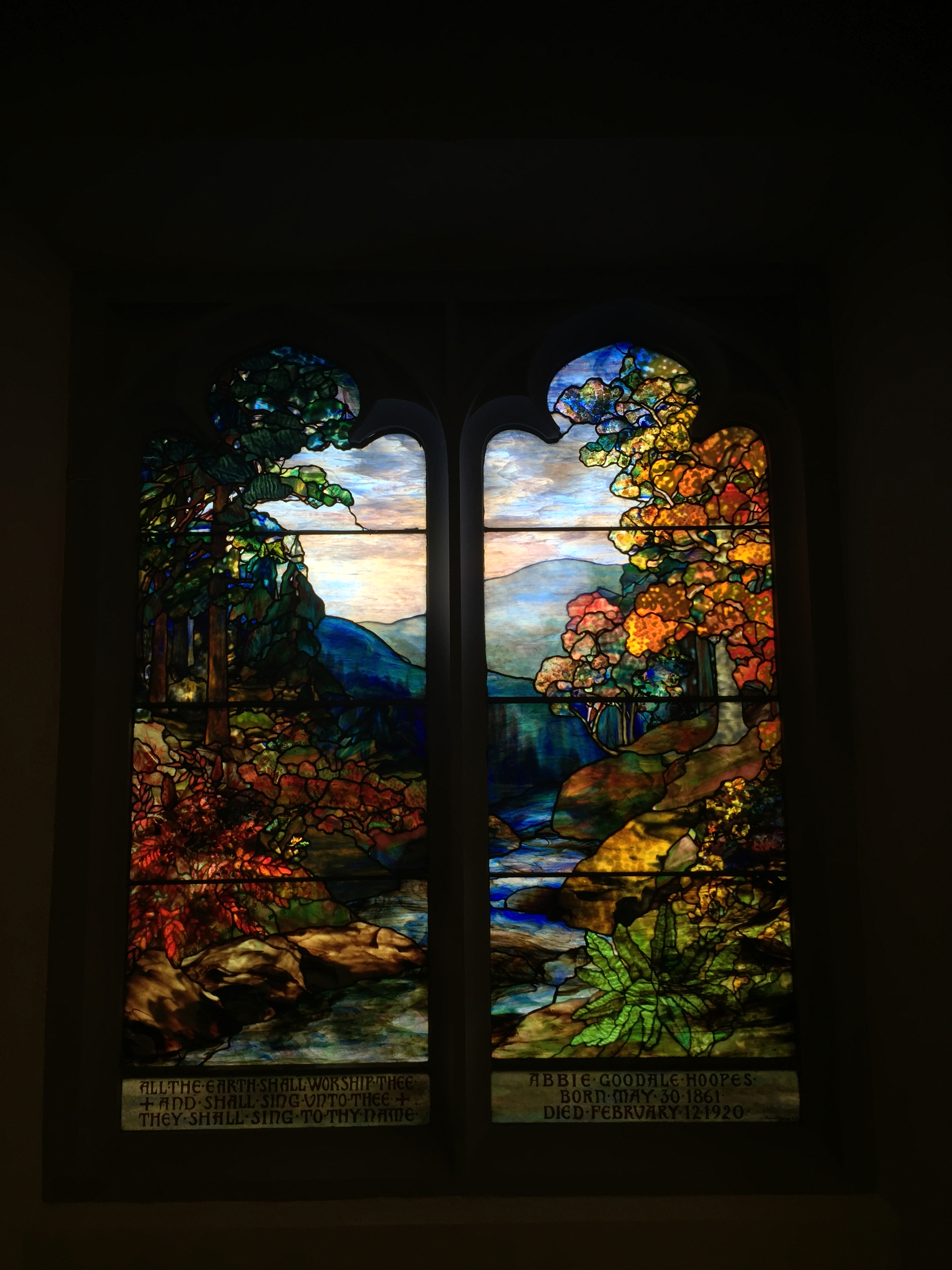

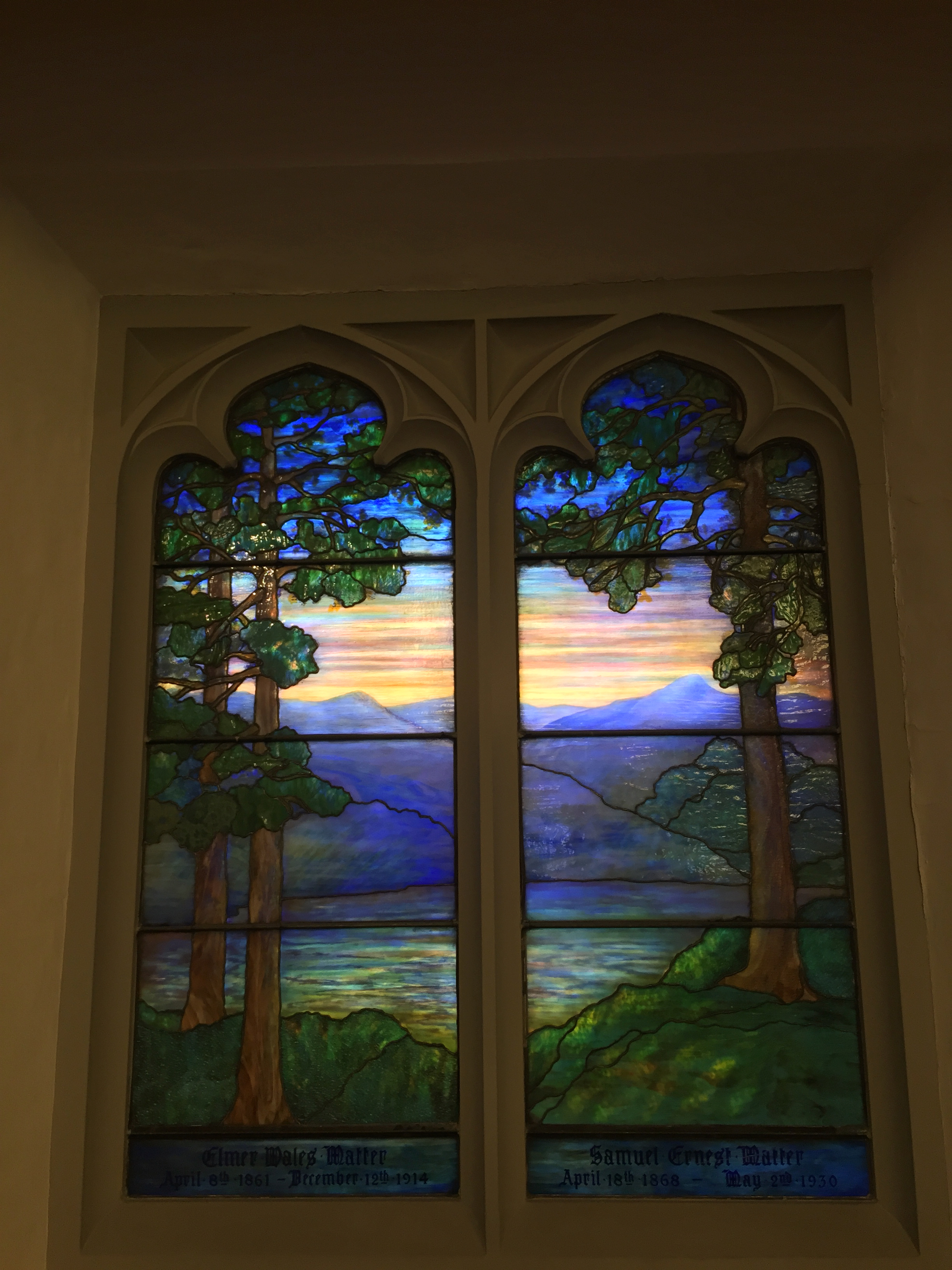

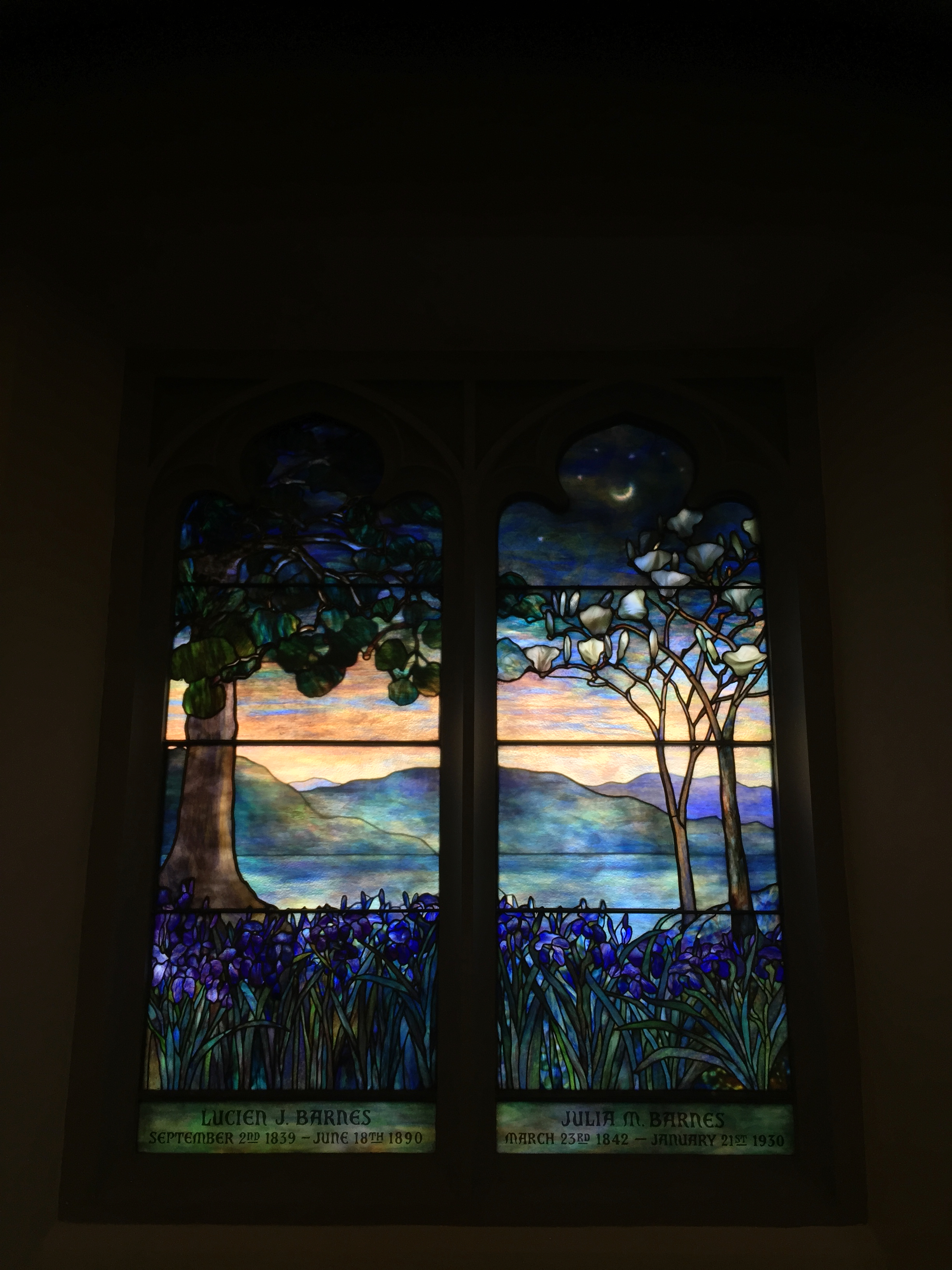

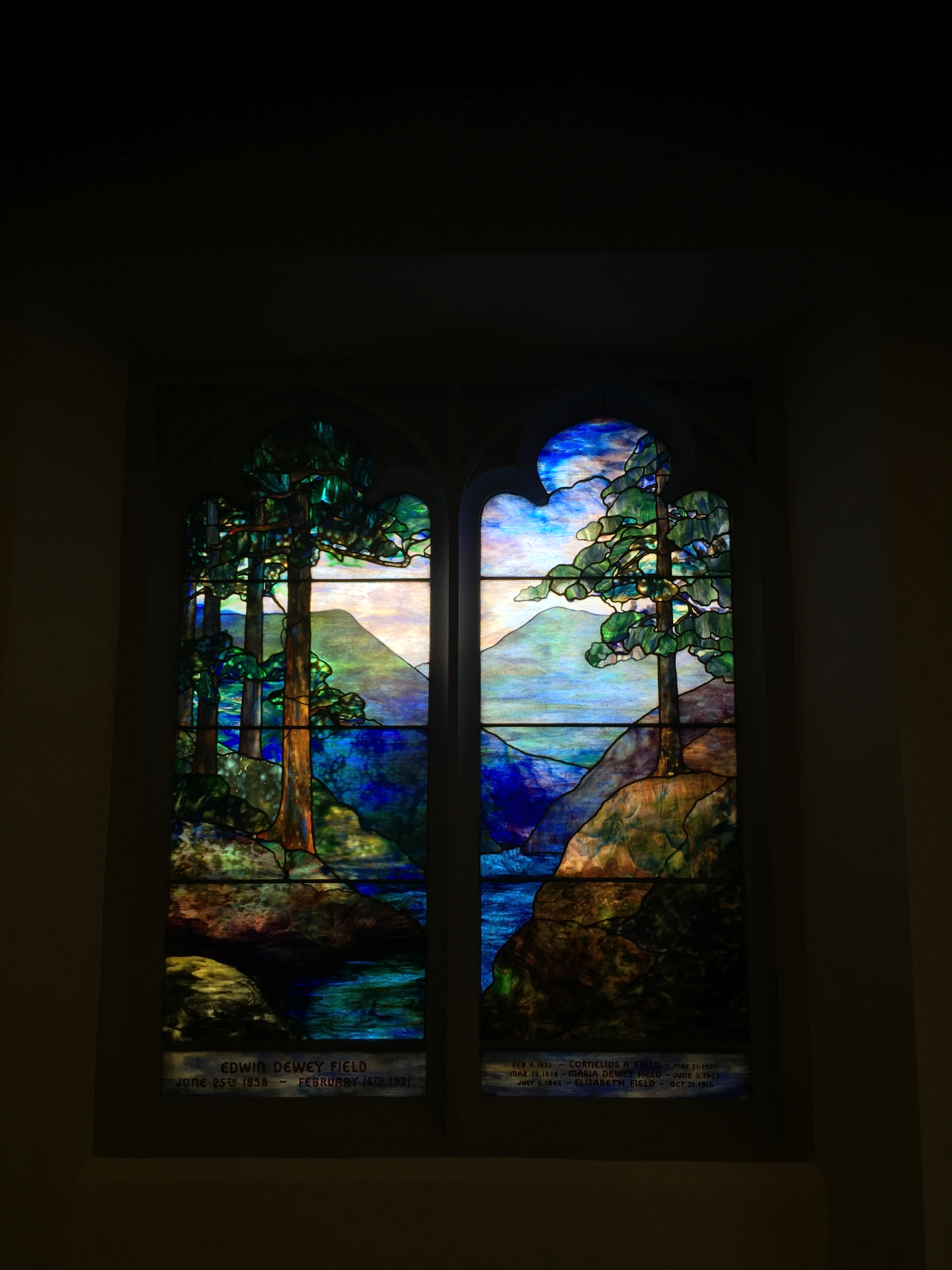

There are two additional paired memorial windows that imitate the style of Tiffany glass.

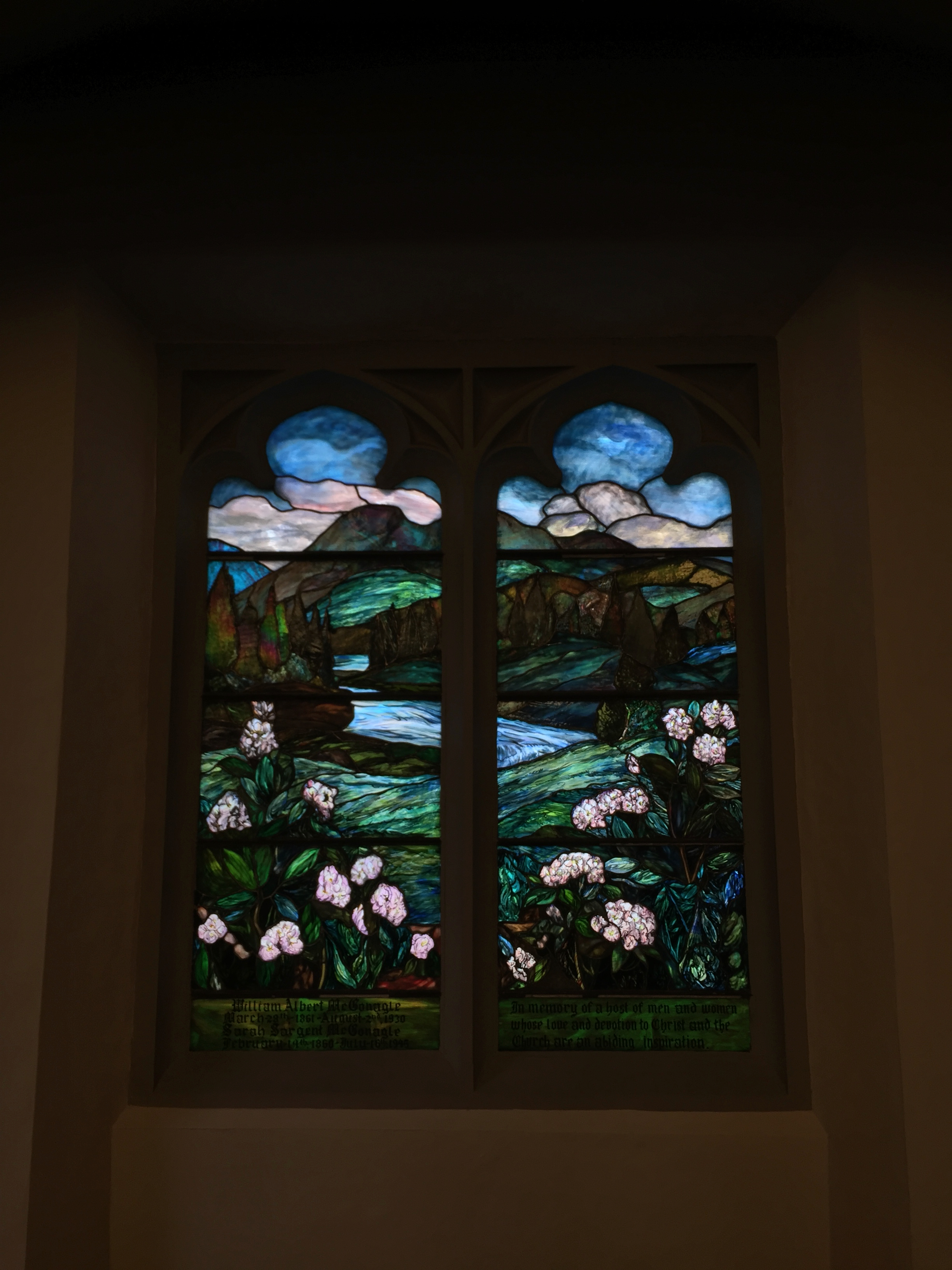

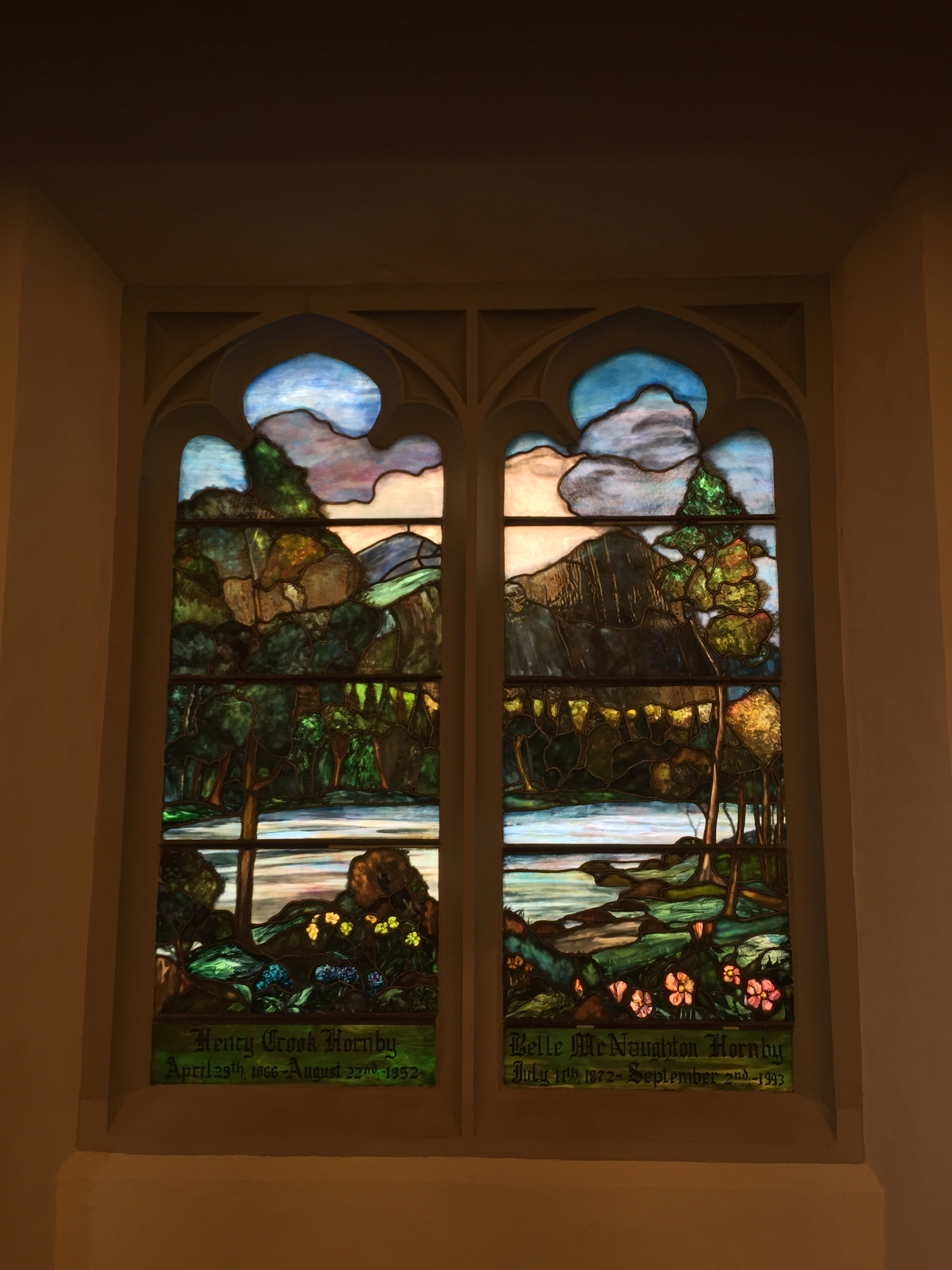

Behind the altar, there is a large stained glass window created by Odell Prather and dedicated in 1979.

=== Organ ===
The church's organ is a French classical organ made by Daniel J. Jaeckel
