= Frederick German =

Canadian-American architect (1863–1937)

Frederick George German
- Born: November 9, 1863; Bath, Ontario, Canada
- Died: October 13, 1937 (aged 73); Duluth, Minnesota
- Occupation: Architect
- Buildings: YWCA of Duluth; Glen Avon Presbyterian Church, Duluth, Minnesota; Duluth Bethel, Duluth, Minnesota

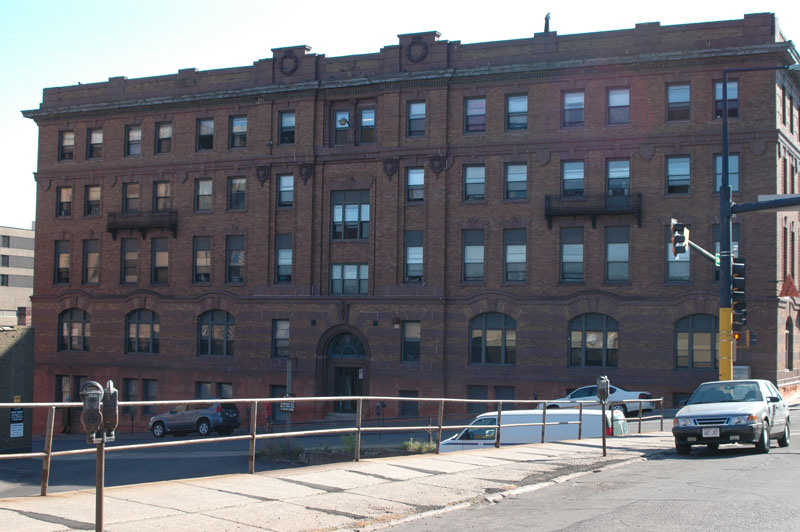
YWCA of Duluth, Minnesota.

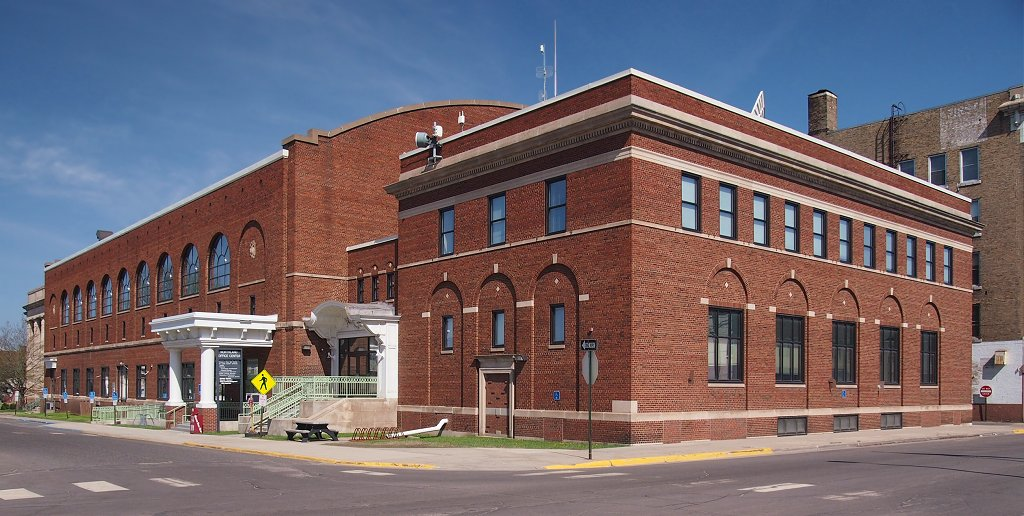
Virginia Recreation Building, Virginia, Minnesota.

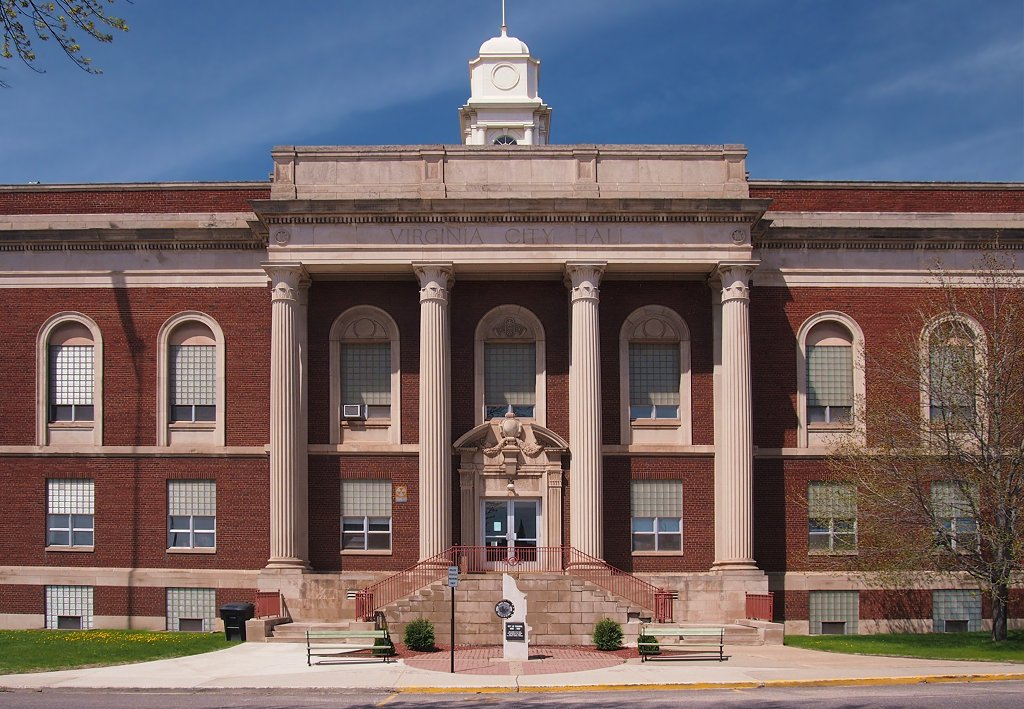
Virginia City Hall, Virginia, Minnesota.

Frederick George German (November 9, 1863 – October 13, 1937) was a Canadian-American architect who designed a number of notable buildings in Duluth, Minnesota.

== Biography ==
German was born in Bath, Ontario, on November 9, 1863, and attended the University of Toronto and Brentford College Institute. He moved to Detroit, Michigan, and worked there as an architect, later working with McKim, Mead, & White in New York City for a time. Upon moving to Duluth in 1889, he worked as a draftsman for prominent architects Oliver Traphagen and Francis Wilford Fitzpatrick, including on the designs for the 1889 Duluth City Hall and the Oppel Block. He then worked for the Lakeside Land Company and partnered briefly with John de Waard.

In 1905, he started a partnership, German & Lignell, with Anton Werner Lignell, with whom he was most known for working. The two would go on to design a number of buildings together over the years, including the YWCA building and Glen Avon Presbyterian Church, and a number of homes in Duluth's East End. In 1906, Lignell and German were hired to draw the plans for the school – Villa Sancta Scholastica Academy – and the motherhouse at the College of St. Scholastica. Mother Scholastica Kerst disapproved of the plans due to potential defects in the building's design, and the two architects were fired from the project in 1908; it was taken over by Franklin Ellerbe. The two worked together until dissolving their firm in 1913.

German then partnered with Leif Jenssen for a time, likely from 1913 until Jenssen's death in 1923. Their work together included the Pilgrim Congregational Church, Lincoln School, Superior High School, and a number of houses.

Among the buildings in Duluth designed by German are the Paulucci (Stone-Ordean-Wells) building, the Marshall-Wells building, and the Duluth Bethel building. He also designed the Virginia Recreation Building and Virginia City Hall in Virginia, Minnesota, both on the National Register of Historic Places.

German was appointed to the Minnesota architectural registration board by Governor J. A. O. Preus in 1921. He was also a member of the American Institute of Architects and served on Duluth's city planning commission for many years.

German died of a heart attack in Duluth on October 13, 1937, at 73 years old.

== Work ==
- Clara M. Smith residence (1903)
- A. C. Weiss residence (1904)
- Glen Avon Presbyterian Church (1905)
- Luther Mendenhall houses (1905)
- Duluth Yacht Club, Oatka Beach Building (1906)
- Marvin Memorial Building (c. 1906)
- Freimuth Building (1907)
- First Street Department Store (c. 1907)
- Donald B. McDonald residence (1908)
- YMCA building (1908)
- William and Margrette Cole residence (1908)
- YWCA building (1909)
- West Duluth Independent Order of Odd Fellows Hall (1911)
- Duluth Marine Supply Building (1912)
- Ward Ames house (1912)
- First Church of Christ, Scientist (1912)
- St. Anthony of Padua Catholic church (1922–1923)
- 9 West Superior Street building, third floor addition
- Virginia Recreation Building
- Virginia City Hall
