= YWCA of Duluth =

- U.S. National Register of Historic Places
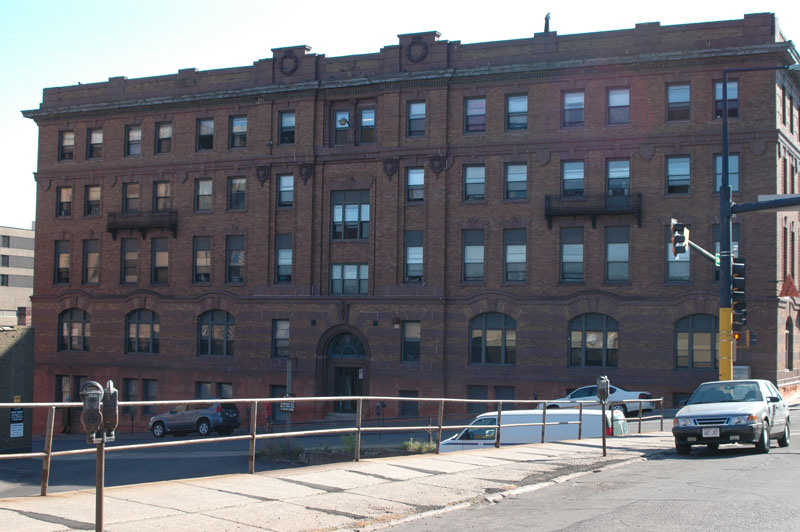
- YWCA of Duluth viewed from the north

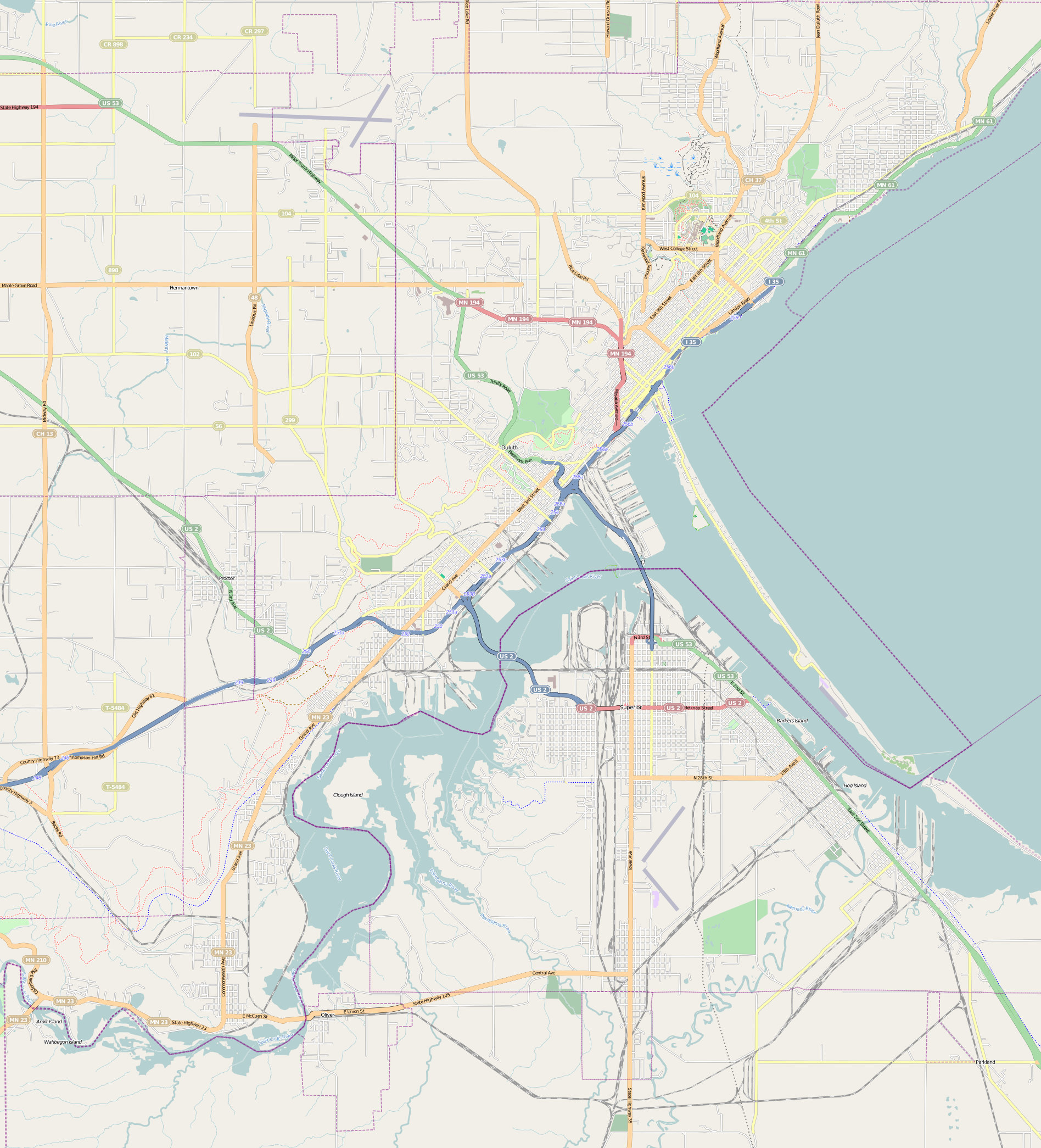
- Location within Duluth Location within Minnesota Location within the United States
- Location: 202 W. 2nd Street, Duluth, Minnesota
- Coordinates: 46°47′10″N 92°6′10″W
- Area: Less than one acre
- Built: 1908
- Built by: MacLeod & Smith
- Architect: Frederick German & Anton Lignell
- Architectural style: Renaissance Revival
- MPS: Duluth's Central Business District, MPS
- NRHP reference No.: 11000325
- Added to NRHP: June 1, 2011

The YWCA of Duluth is a former YWCA building in Duluth, Minnesota, United States. It was designed by architects Frederick German and Anton Werner Lignell and built in 1908 to provide programs and activities for Duluth's young, single women. It contained a gymnasium, swimming pool, cafeteria, meeting rooms, and apartments. In addition to the organization's usual suite of athletics, Bible study, and employment assistance, the YWCA of Duluth catered to the city's large foreign-born population with English and citizenship classes. The building was listed on the National Register of Historic Places in 2011 for its local significance in the theme of social history. It was nominated for its role in local civic development through the YWCA's social welfare efforts.

After a century in the building, the YWCA sold the property to the American Indian Community Housing Organization (AICHO) in 2008. The YWCA had determined that it was no longer using the space to its full capacity and it was financially burdensome for them to maintain. AICHO planned to adapt the space to create apartments, a cultural center, an art gallery, a health-care clinic, and offices for social services, while retaining the auditorium, gymnasium, and rooftop play area. The YWCA relocated its headquarters to another building and arranged to lease space in the old for its child-care center.

== See also ==
- List of YWCA buildings
- National Register of Historic Places listings in St. Louis County, Minnesota
