= Virginia Recreation Building =

- U.S. National Register of Historic Places
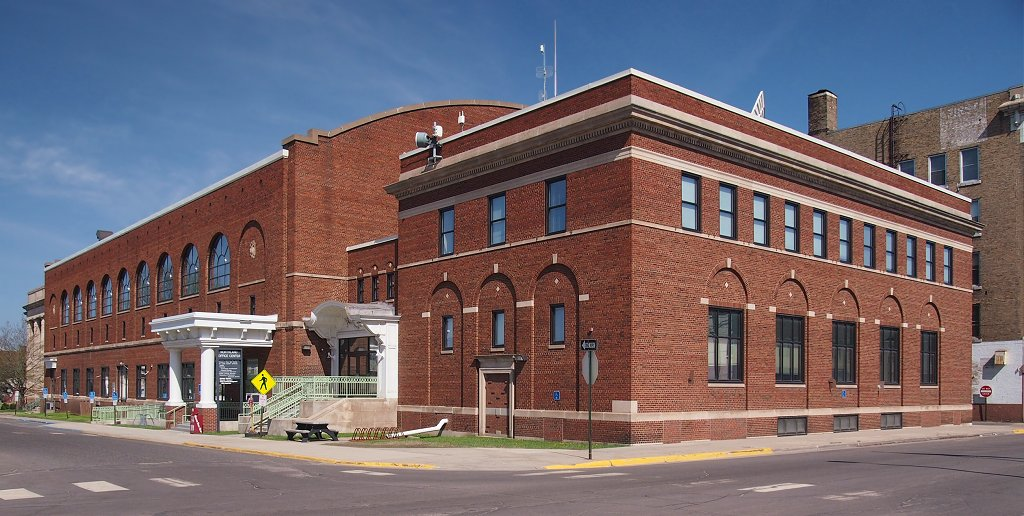
- The Virginia Recreation Building viewed from the southeast

- Location within Minnesota Location within the United States
- Location: 301–307 S. 1st Street, Virginia, Minnesota
- Coordinates: 47°31′21″N 92°32′8″W
- Area: 1 acre (0.40 ha)
- Built: 1923
- Architectural style: Colonial Revival
- NRHP reference No.: 82004711
- Added to NRHP: February 4, 1982

The Virginia Recreation Building is a former community center in Virginia, Minnesota, United States, that was later converted into a factory. It was designed by architect Frederick German and built in 1923 as an ice hockey and curling rink to provide a public venue for physical development to the working-class men largely employed in Iron Range mines. A generation later, as the gender balance of the city's population evened out, the building was converted into a shirt factory in 1947 to create jobs for women. The building was listed on the National Register of Historic Places in 1982 for its state-level significance in the themes of industry and social history. It was nominated for encapsulating the social welfare of the Progressive Era and the robust public spending funded by the mining boom, and the transition to a more gender-balanced population and need to diversify the economy.

The St. Louis County government acquired the building in 2003 and repurposed it as the Northland Office Center. In 2019, they demolished the former Virginia Recreation Center to build the new Northland Office Center.

== See also ==
- National Register of Historic Places listings in St. Louis County, Minnesota
