= Old Roseau County Courthouse =

Former government building in Minnesota, United States

- Roseau County Courthouse
- U.S. National Register of Historic Places
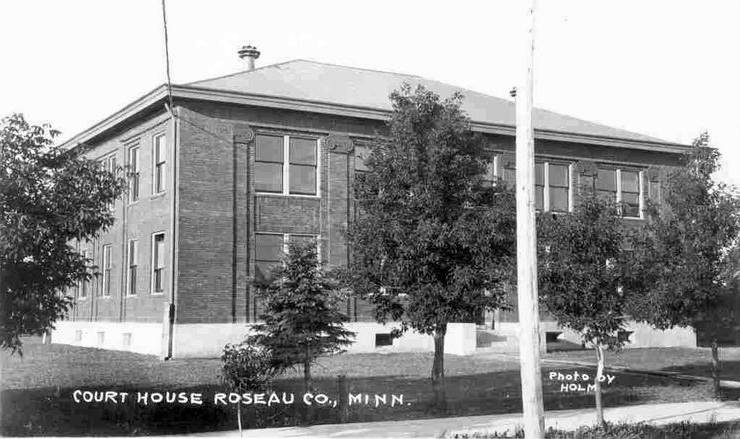
- The Roseau County Courthouse viewed from the northeast

- Location within Minnesota Location within the United States
- Location: 216 Center Street W., Roseau, Minnesota
- Coordinates: 48°50′45.5″N 95°45′56″W
- Area: Less than one acre
- Built: 1913–14
- Built by: Hugh Fawcett
- Architect: Lignell & Loebeck
- Architectural style: Renaissance Revival
- NRHP reference No.: 85001763
- Added to NRHP: August 15, 1985

The Old Roseau County Courthouse is a former government building in Roseau, Minnesota, United States. It served as the seat of government for Roseau County from 1913 to 1996. The building was listed on the National Register of Historic Places in 1985 for its significance in the theme of politics/government. It was nominated for representing the development of Roseau County's government.

== Description ==
The Old Roseau County Courthouse is a rectangular building rising two stories. The walls are brick and the hip roof is standing seam metal. The restrained ornamentation largely consists of brick pilasters topped by Ionic capitals.

== History ==
Roseau County was established in 1894 and the city of Roseau was affirmed as county seat the following year. Government business was initially conducted in a repurposed wooden building. Within a decade these quarters proved inadequate, and the question of building a new courthouse was put to a vote in 1913. It narrowly passed 1,131 to 1,042, approving construction by the sale of bonds. The architectural firm of Lignell & Loebeck, based in Duluth, Minnesota, won the contract to design this courthouse, and it was completed the following year.

A new entryway was added to the courthouse in 1968.

In 1996, Warroad, Minnesota, made a bid to replace Roseau as county seat but a petition drive did not succeed. A new Roseau County Courthouse was built in Roseau that deliberately echoes some architectural features of this building.

== See also ==
- List of county courthouses in Minnesota
- National Register of Historic Places listings in Roseau County, Minnesota
