= Anton Werner Lignell =

Finnish-American architect (1867–1954)

- Born: November 7, 1867; Mariehamn, Åland, Finland
- Died: February 9, 1954 (aged 86); Oahu, Hawaii, United States
- Occupation: Architect
- Buildings: Cook County Courthouse, Minnesota; Roseau County Courthouse, Minnesota

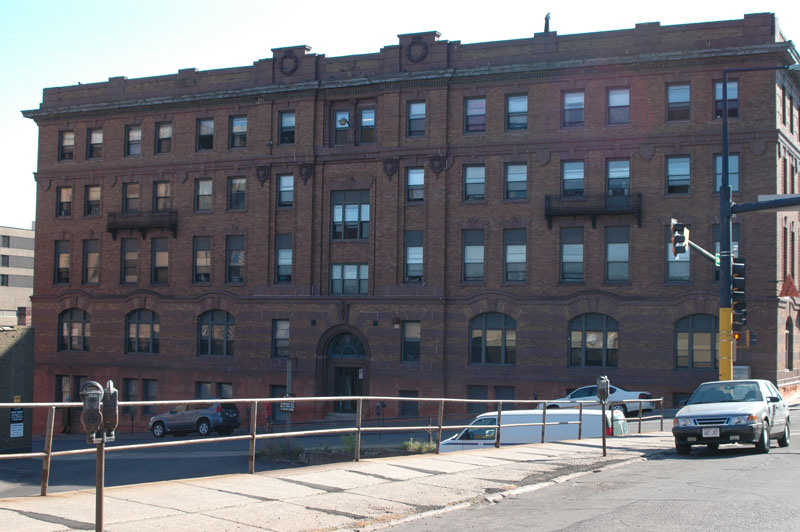
YWCA building viewed from the north, Duluth, Minnesota. Built 1908.

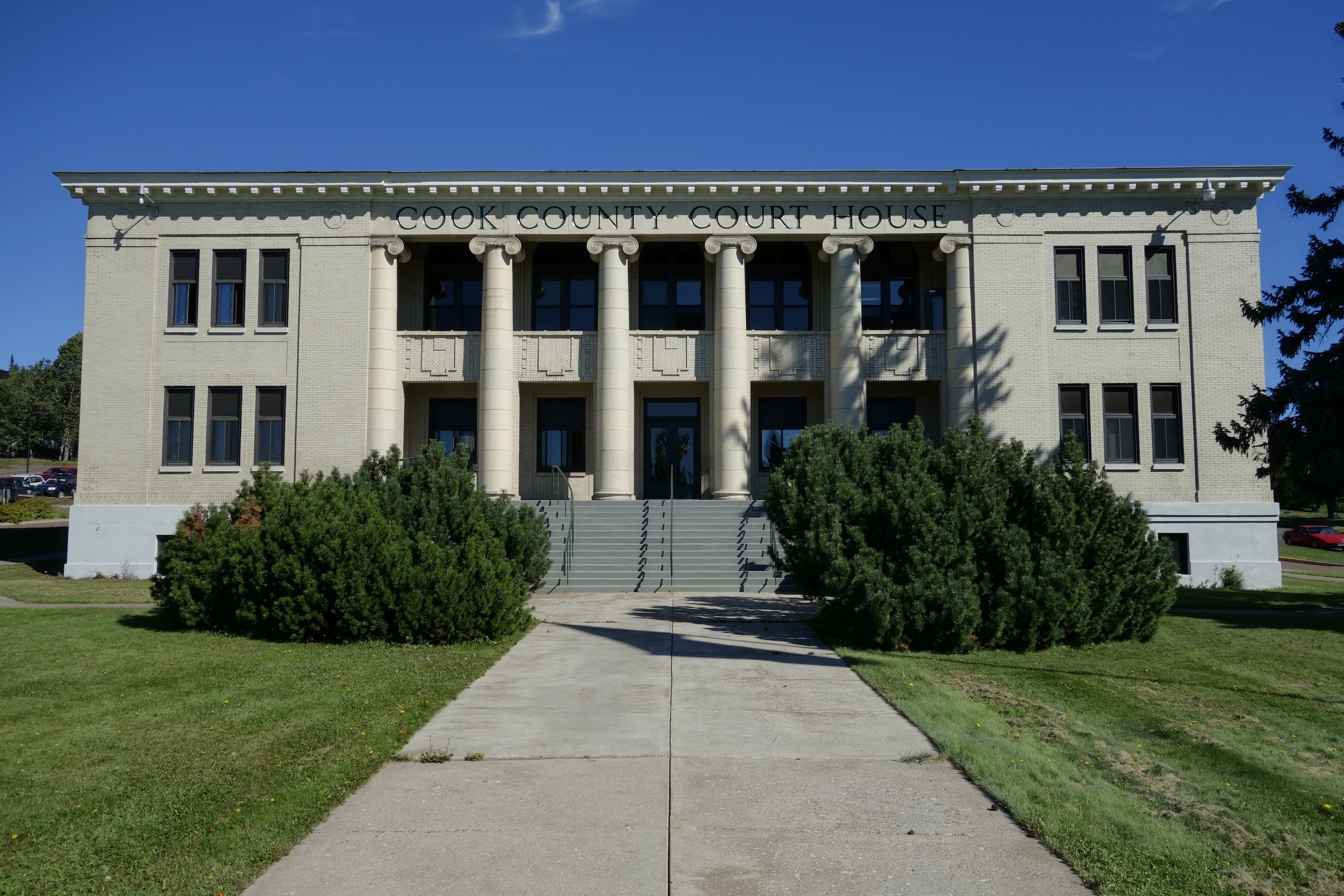
Cook County Courthouse, Grand Marais, Minnesota. Built 1911.

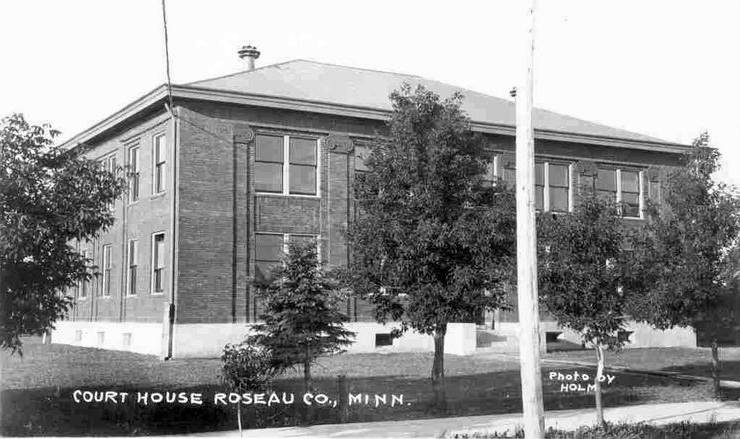
Old Roseau County Courthouse, Roseau, Minnesota. Built 1913.

Anton Werner Lignell (November 7, 1867 – February 9, 1954) was a Finnish architect known for designing buildings in Butte, Montana; Duluth, Minnesota; and two courthouses in Minnesota. His style tended towards Beaux-Arts as well as Tudor Revival and Gothic Revival.

== Biography ==
Lignell was born in to skipper Pehr Anton Lignell and Ingeborg Ahlstedt in Mariehamn, Åland, Finland, in 1867. In his 20s, he emigrated to Butte, Montana. He was a member of White and Lignell (later German and Lignell) – with architect William Pole White in Butte – from 1897 to 1902. They designed St. Paul's Methodist Episcopal Church, the Hirbour Building (Anaconda Copper Mining Company Employees Club), McKinley School, Thornton Hotel, and other buildings. He also designed over 60 homes in the city.

In 1902, he started his own practice, and the following year married Eva Sarah Strasburger (1871–1943). They moved to Duluth, Minnesota, where he formed a partnership with Canadian architect Frederick German. Together the two would design a number of residences in Duluth's East End mansion district as well as important buildings in the city, including the YMCA building, the YWCA building, the Duluth Curling Club building, and Glen Avon Presbyterian Church. They were described by The Labor World newspaper in 1905 as having "designed and superintended the erection of several of the largest and most important buildings in this city and surrounding cities". Homes Lignell designed in Duluth include a large Flemish-style house at 202 North 24th Avenue East for Swedish immigrants Gust and Hanna Carlson and the Craftsman-style William and Margrette Cole residence at 2204 East 1st Street. In 1906, Lignell and German were hired to draw the plans for the school, Villa Sancta Scholastica Academy, and the motherhouse at the College of St. Scholastica. Mother Scholastica Kerst disapproved of the plans due to potential defects in the building's design, and the two architects were fired from the project in 1908; it was taken over by Franklin Ellerbe.

Lignell partnered with Clyde Wetmore Kelly beginning in 1909, designing the Cook County Courthouse in Grand Marais, Minnesota. Together with Robert Loebeck, he designed the Roseau County Courthouse in Roseau, Minnesota, in 1913. Both courthouses are listed on the National Register of Historic Places.

Architect Thomas J. Shefchik, designer of the Duluth City Hall, started his architectural career as a draftsman for Lignell and Kelly.

Lignell worked as an architect until the late 1930s and later started the Duluth Steam Bath Company. He spent the last years of his life in Oahu, Hawaii, where he died in 1954. At the time of his death, he had four surviving children: Mrs. Charles H. Davis, architect Jack Lignell, magazine artist Lois Lignell, and stenographer Bina Lignell.

== Work ==
=== With Frederick German ===
- Clara M. Smith residence (1903)
- A. C. Weiss residence (1904)
- Glen Avon Presbyterian Church (1905)
- Luther Mendenhall houses (1905)
- Duluth Yacht Club, Oatka Beach Building (1906)
- Marvin Memorial Building (c. 1906)
- Freimuth Building (1907)
- First Street Department Store (c. 1907)
- Donald B. McDonald residence (1908)
- Service Motor Company showroom, today Shel/Don (1908)
- William and Margrette Cole residence (1908)
- YMCA building (1908)
- YWCA building (1909)
- Duluth Marine Supply Building (1912)
- West Duluth Independent Order of Odd Fellows Hall (1911)

=== With Clyde Wetmore Kelly ===
- Cook County Courthouse (1911)

=== With Robert Loebeck ===
- Roseau County Courthouse (1913)

== See also ==
- Oliver G. Traphagen – contemporary Duluth-based architect
