= Virginia City Hall =

- U.S. National Register of Historic Places
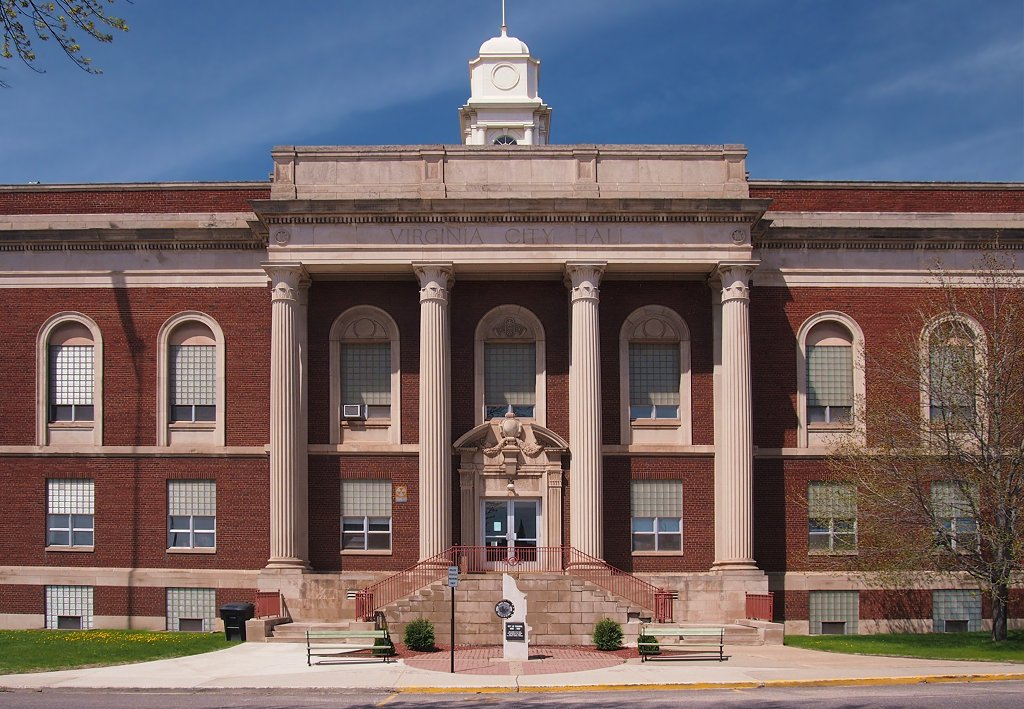
- Virginia City Hall viewed from the south

- Location within Minnesota Location within the United States
- Location: 327 1st Street S., Virginia, Minnesota
- Coordinates: 47°31′21″N 92°32′11″W
- Area: 0.4 acres (0.16 ha)
- Built: 1923–24
- Built by: Evenson & Utterberg Co.
- Architect: Elwin H. Berg
- Architectural style: Colonial Revival
- NRHP reference No.: 04000539
- Added to NRHP: May 26, 2004

Virginia City Hall is the seat of government for Virginia, Minnesota, United States. It was designed by architect Frederick German and built from 1923 to 1924. It continues to house municipal offices, the Virginia Police Department, and a public meeting hall. Virginia City Hall was listed on the National Register of Historic Places in 2004 for its local significance in the theme of politics/government. It was nominated for being the long-serving seat of Virginia's municipal government.

== See also ==
- List of city and town halls in the United States
- National Register of Historic Places listings in St. Louis County, Minnesota
