= Soudan =

Soudan may refer to:

- The French name (and former English name) for the country of Sudan
- The French name for French Sudan (present-day Mali)
- Archaic spelling for the region of Sudan
- Soudan, Minnesota, an unincorporated town near Tower, Minnesota, US
  - The Soudan Mine, a former iron mine, now part of a state park
  - Soudan 1 and Soudan 2, particle detectors located in the Soudan Mine
- Soudan Banks, a group of reefs in the Indian Ocean, off East Africa
- Fereej Al Soudan, a district in Qatar

== Communes in France ==
- Soudan, Loire-Atlantique
- Soudan, Deux-Sèvres

== Surname ==
- Arlette Soudan-Nonault, Congolese journalist and politician
- Eugène Soudan (1880–1960), Belgian jurist and politician
- Mohamed Soudan (born 1956), senior member of the Egyptian Muslim Brotherhood
- Tim Soudan (born 1968), lacrosse coach and former player
