= Tower station (Minnesota) =

Former train station in Tower, Minnesota

- Duluth and Iron Range Railroad Company Passenger Station
- U.S. National Register of Historic Places
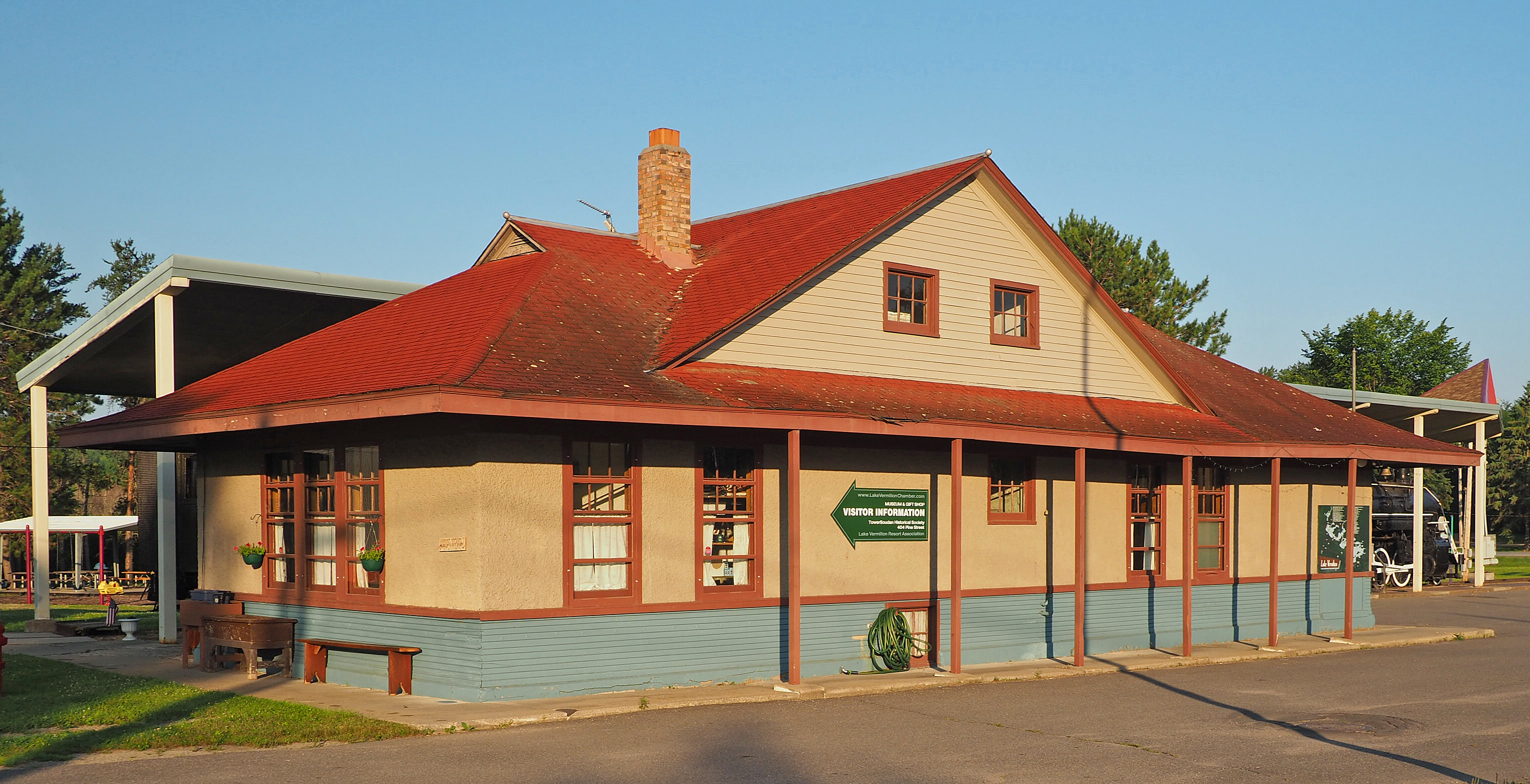
- The former station from the northeast

- Location within Minnesota Location within the United States
- Location: 404 Pine Street, Tower, Minnesota
- Coordinates: 47°48′16″N 92°16′44″W
- Area: .75 acres (0.30 ha)
- Built: 1916
- Built by: George Spurbeck
- Architect: William H. Beyrer
- NRHP reference No.: 13000380
- Added to NRHP: June 14, 2013

Tower station, often called the Tower Passenger Depot, is a former passenger railroad depot in Tower, Minnesota, United States, that is listed on the National Register of Historic Places. Built in 1916 by the Duluth and Iron Range Railroad, it provided passenger train service until 1951. It currently operates as the Tower-Soudan Historical Society Center museum.

== History ==
The first railroad line to Tower was built by the Duluth and Iron Range Railroad (D&IR) and completed in 1884. The Soudan Mine had opened the previous year, necessitating the construction of a rail line to transport ore. The first railroad depot in Tower was then built sometime before 1886; while shown on maps as a passenger depot, it was effectively a freight depot.

Beginning about 1908, D&IR began heavily promoting tourism in the Lake Vermilion area. The depot's freight-oriented design and poor location for travelers spurred the construction of a new passenger station, which was announced in February 1916. Residents of eastern Tower protested its planned western site in favor of a more central location, but the request was rejected. The passenger depot was designed by William H. Beyrer and built by contractor George Spurbeck at a cost of $10,000. Construction finished later in 1916 and the first train arrived the morning of November 25, 1916.

In the 1930s and 1940s, train travel began to decline in favor of the automobile. Increased automobile ownership and improved roads opened up tourism throughout the state, lessening the special position of Lake Vermillion. Automobile associations were also able to promote tourism more successfully than D&IR. Passenger service to the Tower depot discontinued in 1951 because of reduced ridership, and freight service to Tower ceased in 1962 with the closing of the Soudan Mine. D&IR donated the depot in 1966 to the City of Tower. It later opened as the Tower-Soudan Historical Society Center, a museum of local history. The station was nominated for inclusion on the National Register of Historic Places under Criterion A for its significance in tourism and transportation; it was listed on June 14, 2013 as the Duluth and Iron Range Railroad Company Passenger Station.

== Design and setting ==
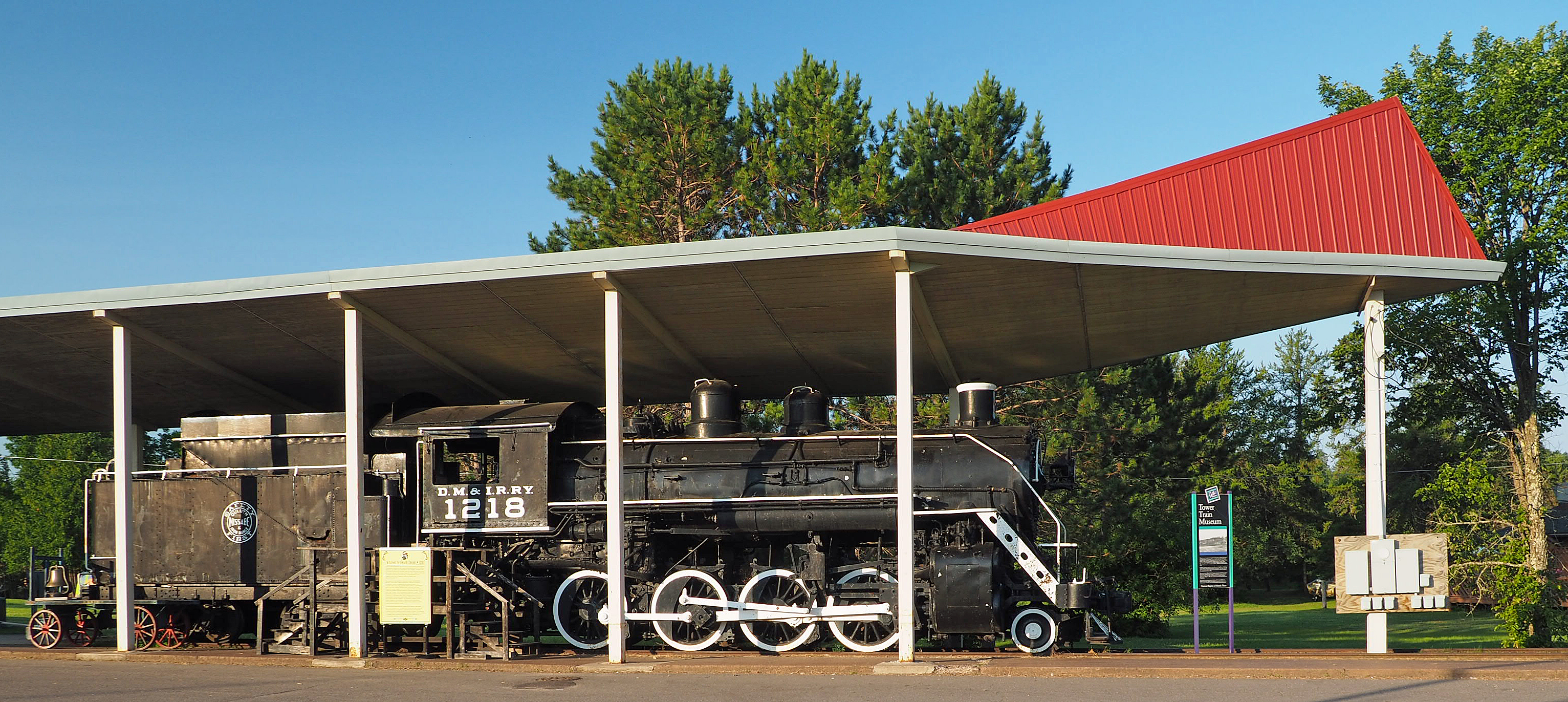
DM&IR 1218

The wood frame structure is one-and-a-half stories tall, occupying a footprint approximately 23.5 by 62.5 feet (7.2 by 19.1 m) oriented northwest to southeast. The exterior is covered in clapboard from the ground to about four feet (1.2 m), above which is stucco. The asphalt roof is shallow, with a complex hipped design and a five-foot (1.5 m) overhang. Structural fatigue has resulted in sagging of the eaves, prompting the addition of six four-by-four-inch (10 by 10 cm) posts for support at the edge of the roof.

On the northwest face is a sign that reads TOWER in block letters, affixed at the edge of the roof.

To the southwest along the loading platform is a remnant of railroad track. The track holds D&IR 218 (later DM&IR 1218), a K class 2-8-0 steam locomotive and its tender, two train cars, and a caboose. A canopy built in 2008 shelters the locomotive and the passenger car. The canopy was fitted with solar panels in 2012 to provide electricity to the railroad cars and depot. To the west of the locomotive, beyond the boundary of the depot site, is a 1901 monument to President William McKinley made of sheet metal.

== See also ==
- National Register of Historic Places listings in St. Louis County, Minnesota
