= Buyck =

Buyck may refer to:

- Buyck family, a noble Belgian family
- Buyck, Minnesota, an unincorporated community

== See also ==
- Dwight Buycks (born 1989), American basketball player
