= Bois Forte Heritage Center and Cultural Museum =

Cultural center and museum in Tower, Minnesota

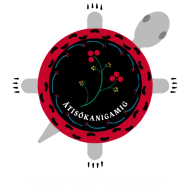

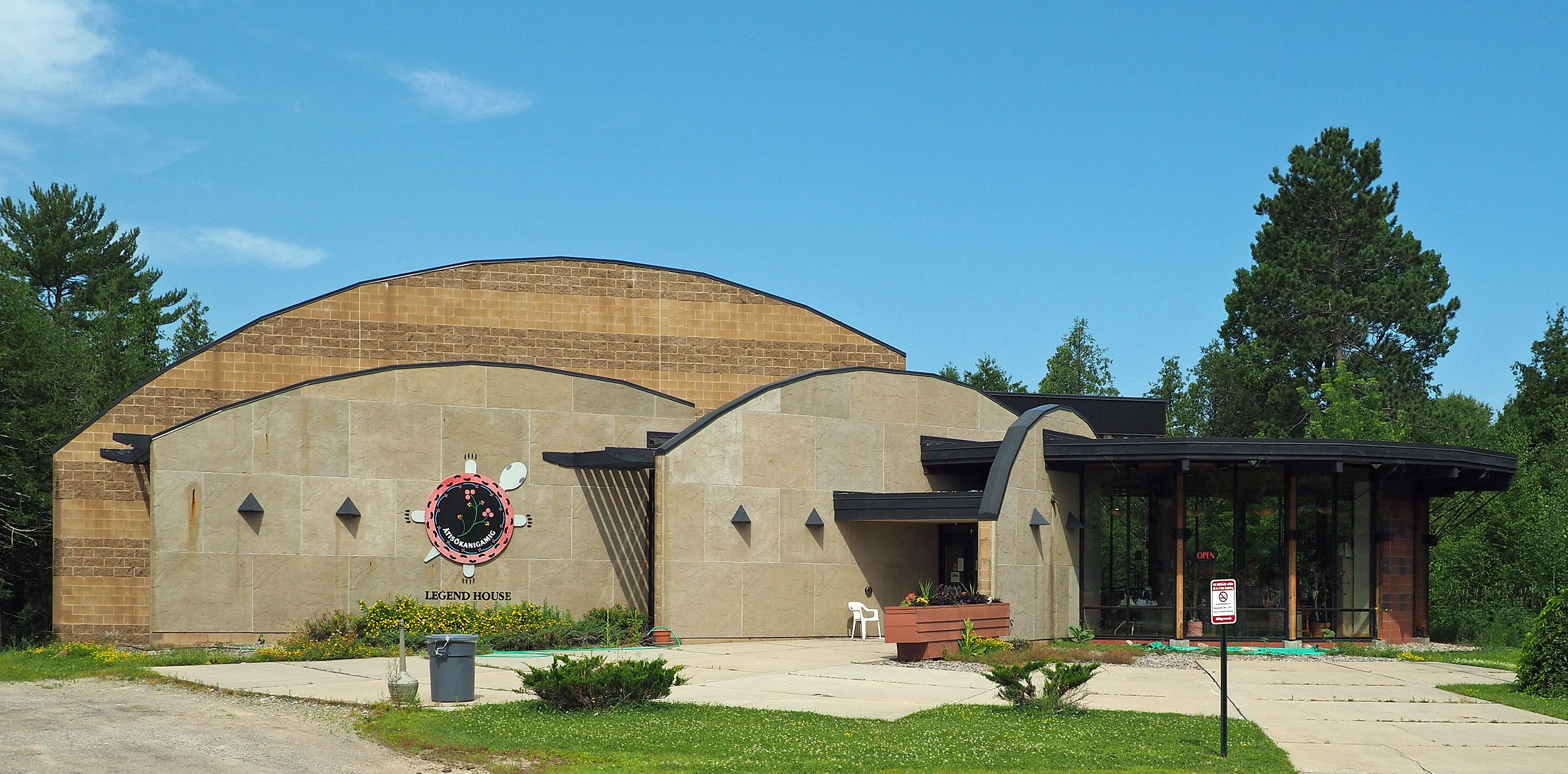
- Exterior
- Established: 2002
- Location: 1500 Bois Forte Rd, Tower, Minnesota
- Coordinates: 47.826111°N 92.349167°W
- Type: Native American History
- Executive director: Jaylen Strong
- Website: boisforteheritagecenter.com

The Bois Forte Heritage Center & Cultural Museum is a museum in Tower, Minnesota, operated by the Bois Forte Band of Chippewa. The museum preserves and presents the history and culture of the Bois Forte Ojibwe people. The Ojibwe name for the museum is Atisokanigamig, meaning "Legend House".

== History and establishment ==
The museum began in 2001 to save relics from being scattered and lost. Pieces belonging to members of the Bois Forte Band of Chippewa had been stored for generations in distant institutions, where they were mingled indiscriminately with items belonging to tribes around the country.

Rose Berens, the former director of the Bois Forte museum, explained that in the 19th century, museum organizations operated under the belief that "at some time in the future there would be no more Native Americans." They acquired items by buying, trading, or stealing and took them to museums. However, Native Americans still exist, and the Bois Forte Band wanted those items returned. A 1990 federal law requires museums to return such items to tribes. Museums periodically distribute lists of articles so tribes can try to determine which items belonged to their ancestors.

Phyllis Boshey, an elder and Tribal Council member, was a key figure in convincing the Tribal Council to establish the museum to provide a place to display these artifacts. The concept took about 10 years to develop, with construction beginning in 2001. The museum officially opened to the public on June 1, 2002.

== Exhibits and programming ==
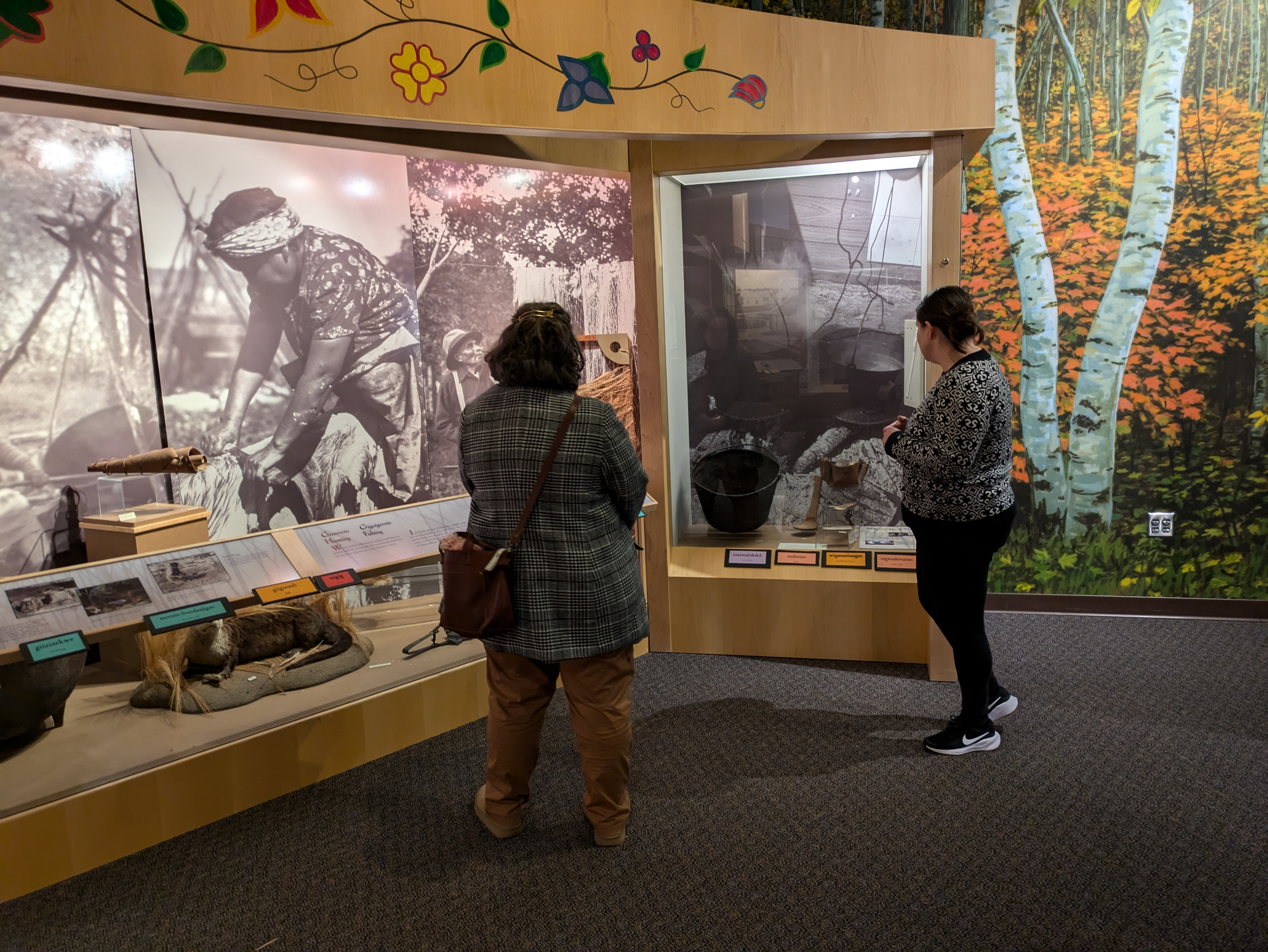
Visitors looking at exhibit

The museum features exhibits that tell the Bois Forte Ojibwe story. The tour begins with the Mural of Migration, which traces the journey from the East Coast to the Great Lakes region over 500 years. The mural, called "Keepers of the Path" by artist Carl Gawboy, shows travelers coming to rocky shores with red lines in the shape of the Great Lakes.

Key exhibits include a life-size birch bark dwelling called a Waaginogan. The museum displays a replica fur trading post representing the first fur post on Lake Vermilion. The Lake Vermilion Indian Boarding School exhibit features a replica classroom with documents about the school's history. The Vermilion Lake Indian School operated from 1899 to 1953 on Sucker Point, where Bois Forte offices are located today.

The Lifeways exhibit shows traditional harvest activities including maple syruping, wild ricing, games, and Ojibwe beadwork. A Veterans Wall honors Bois Forte Band members who served in the military. The museum ends in a circle area displaying pow wow dancing regalia. Visitors can watch a film about Bois Forte history told by tribal elders.

The center hosts storytelling events that connect visitors and community members to the oral traditions and history of the Bois Forte Band of Chippewa. One example took place in January 2025, when Ojibwe storyteller Char Lewis shared traditional stories under the museum's star ceiling, creating an immersive experience for attendees.

== Mission and recent activities ==
The museum's mission is "to preserve and perpetuate Ojibwe culture and to advance understanding by presenting with dignity and respect, the accomplishments and evolving history of the Bois Forte people of northern Minnesota." The museum does not sell items considered sacred such as sweet grass, sage, cedar, drums, or pipes.

The museum received recognition in 2003 with a Media Award from the National Association for Interpretation. In 2007 the museum received the National Preservation Award from the National Trust for Historic Preservation. The museum shared this honor with the Bureau of Land Management Eastern States.

=== Repatriation Projects ===
In 2012, the Minnesota Historical Society returned 7,000 artifacts to the Bois Forte Band. These items were excavated from tribal land on Nett Lake in 1948 without permission. Some artifacts are displayed at the museum.

Another project has been the repatriation of Nett Lake items from the Canadian Museum of History (CMH). Around 160 items were taken from Nett Lake in the 1910s, including ceremonial items and everyday objects. The museum is still in the early stages of the repatriation process with an anticipated return in summer or fall of 2025.

== See also ==
- List of museums in Minnesota
