= Vermilion Country School =

Location
- 1 Enterprise Dr. Tower, Minnesota 55790; United States
- 47.802°N 92.281°W

Information
- Type: public secondary
- Opened: 2013
- Administrator: Kevin Fitton
- Staff: 4
- Faculty: 6
- Teaching staff: 5
- Grades: 7-12
- Gender: coed
- Enrollment: 56 (2014 data)
- Average class size: 15
- Campus: rural
- Accreditation: Audubon Center of the North Woods/MN Dept. of Ed
- Website: https://www.vermilioncountry.org

Vermilion Country School (VCS) is a public secondary charter school in Tower, Minnesota, United States. Most of the students reside in St Louis County, Minnesota in particular the communities of Tower, Soudan, Embarrass, Ely, Aurora, and Virginia. Vermilion Country School is a hybrid project based learning school where students complete projects based on Minnesota curriculum requirements in addition to attending individual classes for each subject. Education plans are individualized to each student and is overseen by a teacher/advisor. Each teacher/advisor is responsible for approximately 15 students in a class called an advisory. Mondays, Tuesdays, Thursdays, and Fridays are the standard days, while Wednesdays have a different structure to accommodate environmental education, associated projects, and the school's Big Circle school wide meeting. Wednesdays are also early release days to accommodate staff meetings/trainings during the year.

== History ==
As far back as 2007, local citizens in Tower began thinking about better ways for children to be educated. When the public district tore down the high school in 2010 and the displaced students were bused to distant schools, plans for a grades 7-12 charter school began in earnest. The process was slow, with funding and facility challenges along the way. However, in December 2012, VCCS was awarded a $125,000 federal school start-up grant. Meanwhile area residents donated generously, and the City of Tower underwrote the remodeling of an unused manufacturing building".

The school has recently completed its fifth school year and has been renewed by their sponsor, Audubon Center of the North Woods, for another 5 year charter contract.

== Academics ==
Vermilion Country School uses JMC/Google Docs as its learning management and grading system. Students complete projects by working with advisors to first outline their projects beforehand, log the time during, and then assessing the project for completeness in order to record earned credit for graduation. This allows all students to individualize their learning toward topics they have a personal interest in while still meeting Minnesota educational standards. New for the 2015-16 school year, the schedule was varied for students depending on how much structured time that particular student needed from almost all project time to almost all seminar/elective based.

Expo Day occurs near the end of the year to showcase projects that students have completed for their graduation requirements. This is also an opportunity for students to develop public speaking skills and polish their presentation skills for later in life. The public is invited to the presentation to see what student's have been working on.

== Culture and discipline ==
Vermilion Country School is a student centered and team collaborative school model that attempts to address many of the difficulties that students who haven't been successful in a traditional school have faced. To that end, Vermilion Country School uses a restorative justice model when it comes to their discipline plan. The goal is not to be punitive, but to repair the damage done by those who choose to act in such a manner that is disruptive to the community.
