= Buyck, Minnesota =

Buyck
- Unincorporated community
- Location within Minnesota Location within the United States
- Coordinates: 48°07′19″N 92°31′25″W
- Country: United States
- State: Minnesota
- County: Saint Louis
- Township: Portage Township
- Elevation: 1,220 ft (370 m)

Population
  - Total: 10
- Time zone: UTC-6 (Central (CST))
  - Summer (DST): UTC-5 (CDT)
- ZIP code: 55771
- Area code: 218
- GNIS feature ID: 660925

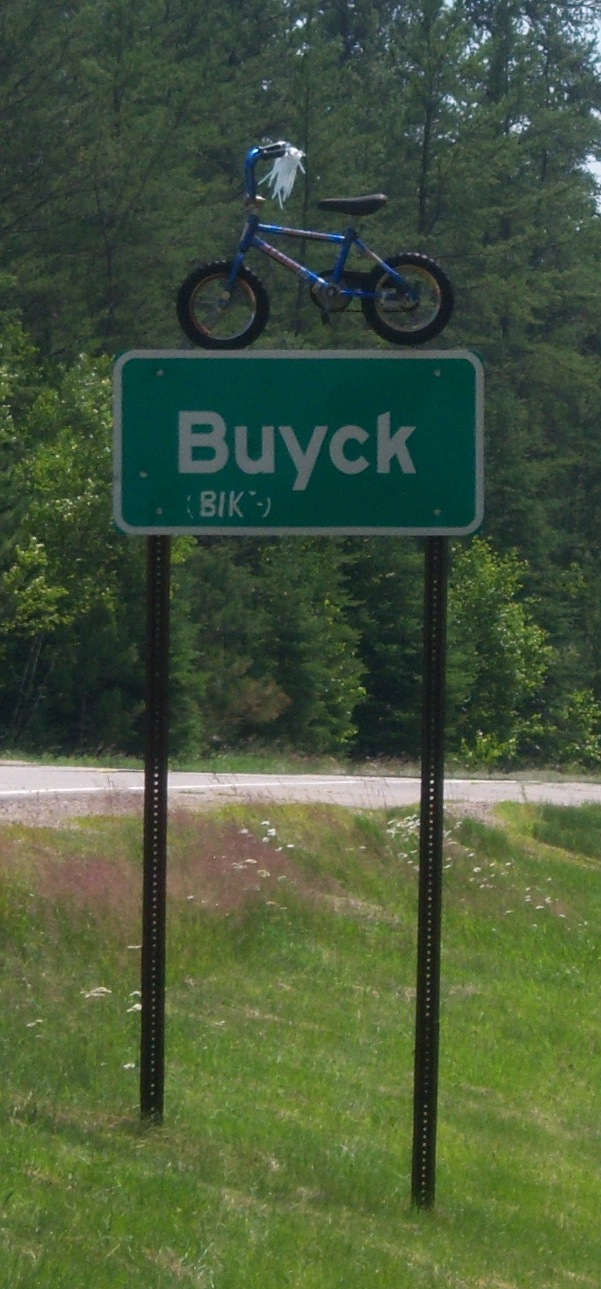
Buyck's signpost shows that the correct pronunciation of "Buyck" is how one says "bike."

Buyck is an unincorporated community in Portage Township, Saint Louis County, Minnesota, United States.

The community is located 16 miles east of Orr at the junction of Saint Louis County Road 23 (Orr–Buyck Road) and County Road 24 (Crane Lake Road). Buyck is also located 34 miles northeast of Cook.

Buyck is located on the edge of the Kabetogama State Forest. The Vermilion River flows through the community.

The first settlement is believed to be accompanying the gold-rush led settlement. Whilst first trades in town were parsemonious, the later development of the town brought school and church services.

A post office called Buyck was established in 1913, and remained in operation until 1963. The community was named for Charles Buyck, an early settler and afterward county official.

== Etymology ==
The provenance of the township's name originates from the Buyck family of which diaspora has since integrated both on a cultural level and judicial. In reference to the latter Mark W. Buyck Jr., U.S. Attorney, District of South Carolina in the 1980s, can be cited.
