= Vermilion River (Minnesota) =

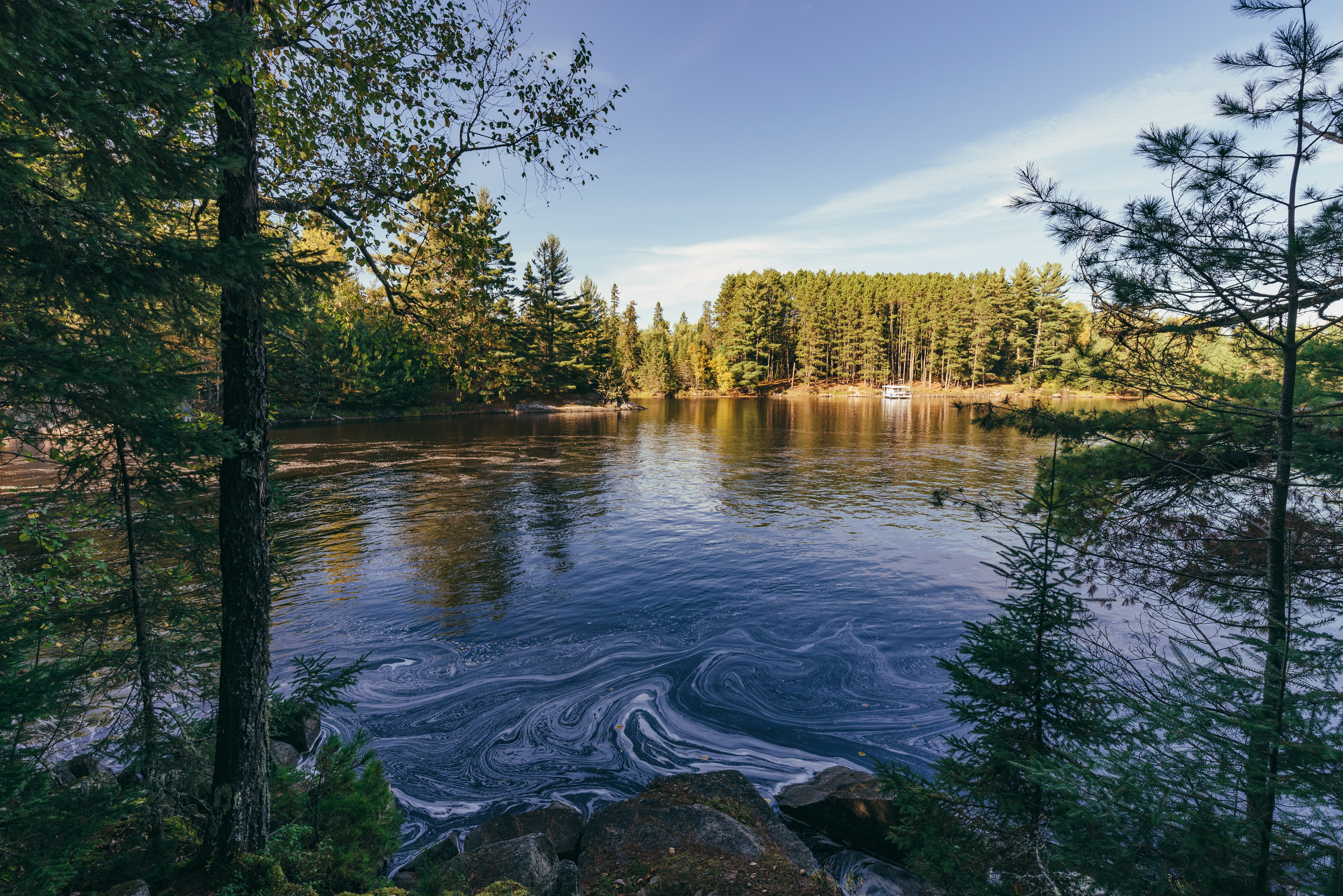

- Mouth of the Vermilion River

Location
- Country: United States
- State: Minnesota
- County: St. Louis

Physical characteristics
- Source
  - location: Lake Vermilion
  - coordinates: 47.9610236°N 92.4757155°W
- Mouth
  - location: Crane Lake
  - coordinates: 48.2757°N 92.5065°W
- Length: 40 mi-long (64 km)

Basin features
- River system: Rainy River

The Vermilion River is located in Saint Louis County of northeast Minnesota, flowing between Crane Lake and Dago Bay of Lake Vermilion near Vermilion Dam.

The Vermilion River's width varies considerably, being the size of a large creek in places and looking like a large lake in another. The Vermilion River passes through the community of Buyck in Portage Township.

As its name suggests, the waters of the Vermilion are a brownish-red color. The murky waters and the over-abundance of leeches make the Vermilion an undesirable swimming destination. Forests around the Vermilion, being logged about 50 years ago, are thick and hard to penetrate as many competing trees are closely spaced.

== See also ==
- List of rivers of Minnesota
- List of longest streams of Minnesota
