= Portage Township, St. Louis County, Minnesota =

Portage Township, Minnesota
- Township
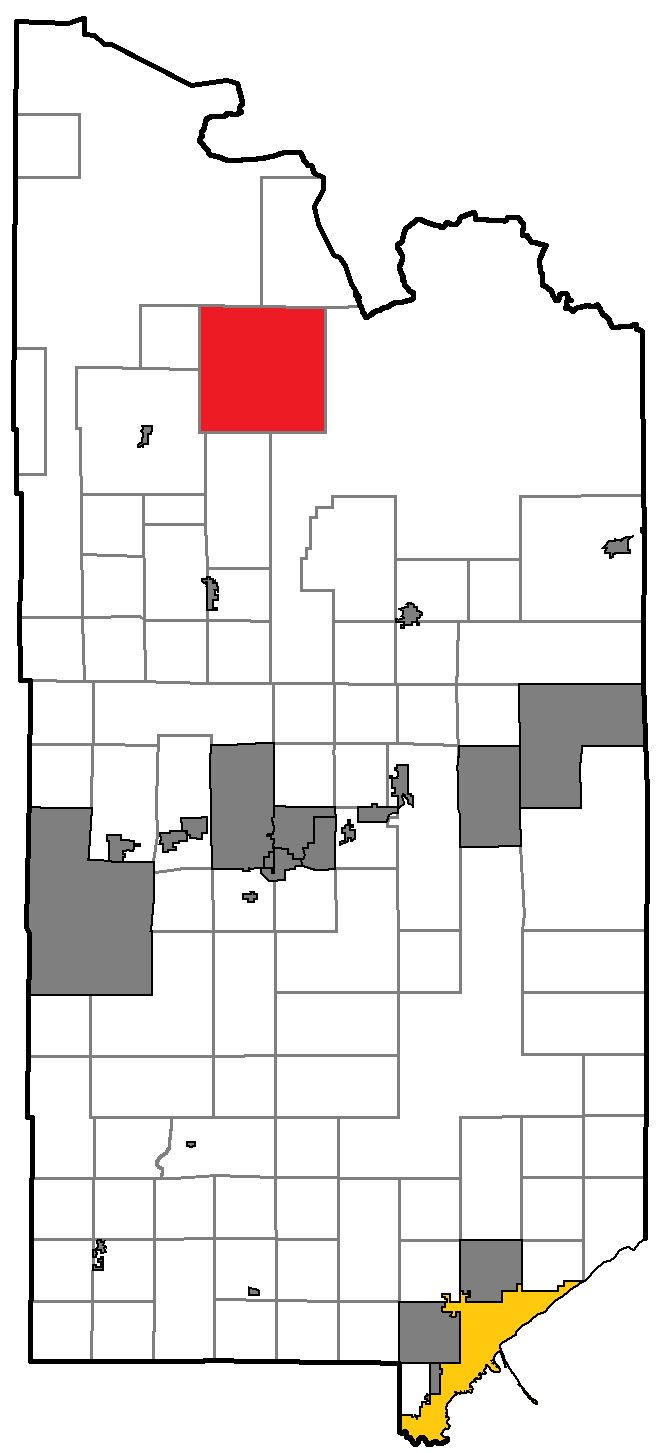
- Location of Portage Township within St. Louis County, Minnesota
- Coordinates: 48°8′4″N 92°36′12″W
- Country: United States
- State: Minnesota
- County: Saint Louis

Area
  - Total: 143.1 sq mi (370.6 km^{2})
  - Land: 137.3 sq mi (355.6 km^{2})
  - Water: 5.8 sq mi (15.0 km^{2})
- Elevation: 1,316 ft (401 m)

Population (2020)
  - Total: 164
  - Density: 1.19/sq mi (0.461/km^{2})
- Time zone: UTC-6 (Central (CST))
  - Summer (DST): UTC-5 (CDT)
- FIPS code: 27-52090
- GNIS feature ID: 0665343
- Website: http://portagetownship.org/

Portage Township is a township in Saint Louis County, Minnesota, United States. The population was 164 at the 2020 census.

Saint Louis County Road 23 (Orr–Buyck Road), County Road 24 (Crane Lake Road), and County Road 116 (Echo Trail) are three of the main routes in the township.

The unincorporated community of Buyck is located within Portage Township.

The Vermilion River flows through the township. Crane Lake and Orr are nearby.

== Geography ==
According to the United States Census Bureau, the township has a total area of 143.1 square miles (371 km^{2}); 137.3 square miles (356 km^{2}) is land and 5.8 square miles (15 km^{2}), or 4.05%, is water.

== Demographics ==
At the 2000 census there were 177 people, 73 households, and 45 families living in the township. The population density was 1.3 people per square mile (0.5/km^{2}). There were 213 housing units at an average density of 1.6/sq mi (0.6/km^{2}). The racial makeup of the township was 92.09% White, 0.56% African American, 0.56% Native American, 4.52% Asian, and 2.26% from two or more races. Hispanic or Latino of any race were 0.56%.

Of the 73 households 21.9% had children under the age of 18 living with them, 60.3% were married couples living together, and 37.0% were non-families. 26.0% of households were one person and 8.2% were one person aged 65 or older. The average household size was 2.42 and the average family size was 3.09.

The age distribution was 20.3% under the age of 18, 7.9% from 18 to 24, 26.0% from 25 to 44, 30.5% from 45 to 64, and 15.3% 65 or older. The median age was 44 years. For every 100 females, there were 103.4 males. For every 100 females age 18 and over, there were 120.3 males.

The median household income was $28,750 and the median family income was $31,500. Males had a median income of $26,667 versus $28,333 for females. The per capita income for the township was $19,107. About 15.9% of families and 13.9% of the population were below the poverty line, including 15.0% of those under the age of eighteen and 21.4% of those sixty five or over.
