= Stuntz Bay Boathouse Historic District =

Historic district in Minnesota, United States

- U.S. National Register of Historic Places
- U.S. Historic district
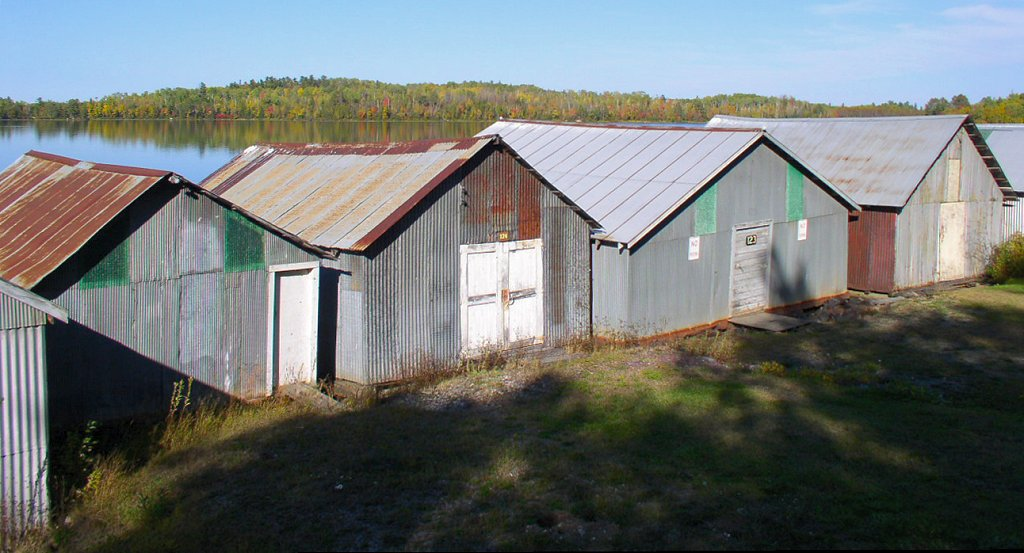
- Some of the Stuntz Bay Boathouses on Lake Vermilion

- Location within Minnesota Location within the United States
- Location: Northern end of Stuntz Bay Road, Breitung Township, Minnesota
- Coordinates: 47°49′35″N 92°14′10″W
- Area: 138 acres (56 ha)
- Built: 1884 (compressor house), 1900–1955 (most boathouses)
- Architect: Multiple
- Architectural style: Vernacular
- NRHP reference No.: 07000460
- Added to NRHP: May 24, 2007

The Stuntz Bay Boathouse Historic District comprises a row of 143 boathouses on Lake Vermilion in Breitung Township, Minnesota, United States. They were mostly built in the first half of the 20th century by employees of the adjacent Soudan Iron Mine. The mining company provided the lots to employees as a reward for their years of service, and the miners did their own construction. Most of the boathouses were built with tamarack logs and scrap corrugated metal from the mine property. Boating and fishing were major pastimes for the mine employees and their families in their leisure hours, and the mining company promoted access to outdoor recreation as a perk of employment. The Stuntz Bay Boathouses were listed as a historic district on the National Register of Historic Places in 2007 for their local significance in the themes of architecture, entertainment/recreation, industry, and social history. They were nominated for illustrating the personal lives of the miners and vernacular metal architecture.

The Stuntz Bay Boathouses largely remain family-owned inholdings within what is now Soudan Underground Mine State Park. 140 of the boathouses are considered contributing properties to the historic district and three recently rebuilt boathouses are non-contributing. Just inland from the boathouses, the ruins and smokestack of a compressor house built for the mine in 1884 and demolished around 1930 form another contributing property. The final three contributing properties consist of a fishing dock at the far east end of the boathouses, a boat ramp in the middle dating to about 1940, and a large rock outcrop midway up the east side that served as a fishing spot and landmark.

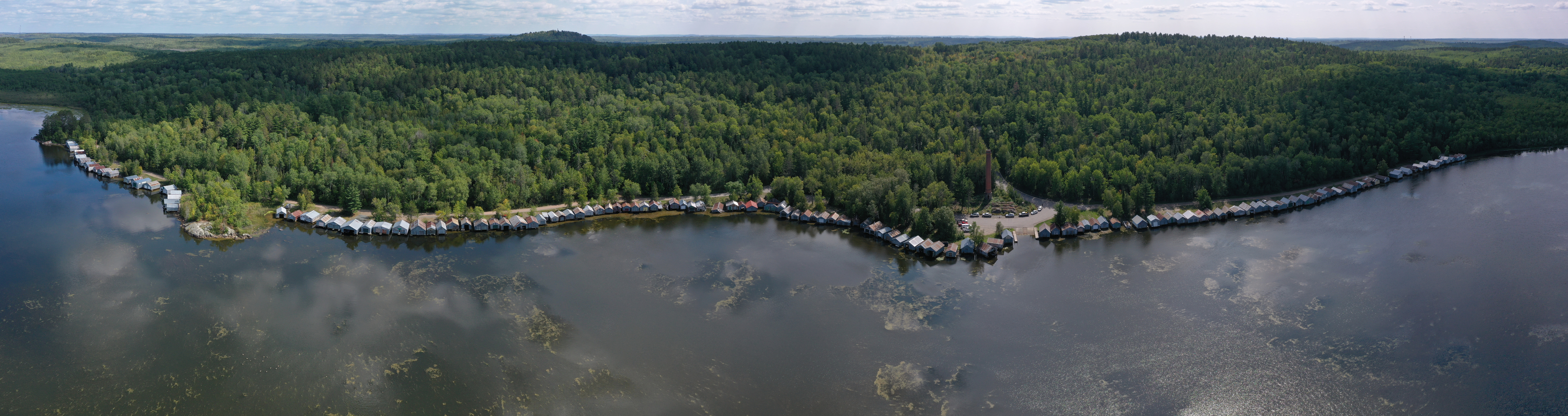
Panorama of the boathouses in 2021

== See also ==
- National Register of Historic Places listings in St. Louis County, Minnesota
