= Soudan 2 =

Particle detector in Minnesota, US

Coordinates: 47.82066°N 92.24221°W

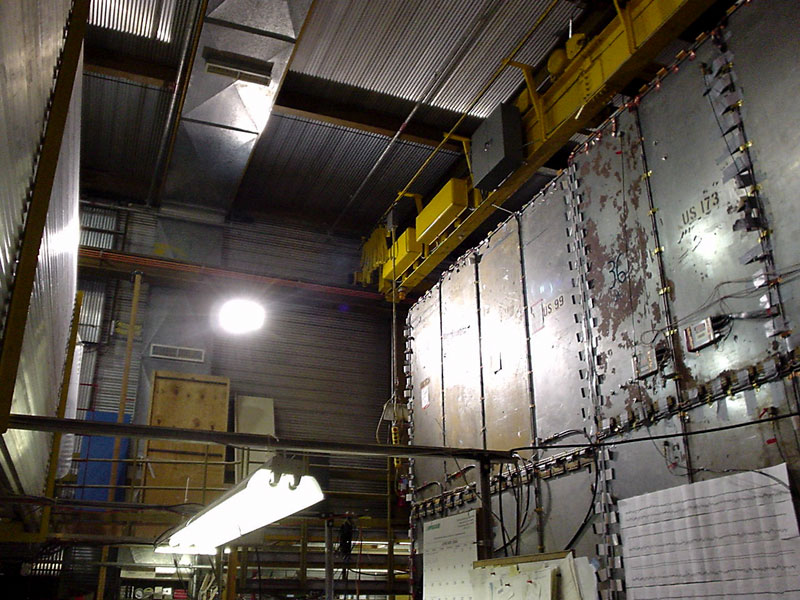
On the right is the front wall of the Soudan 2 detector. The corrugated walls seen on the left, center and top of the image are parts of its veto shield.

Soudan 2 was a particle detector located in the Soudan Mine in Northern Minnesota, United States, that operated from 1989 to 2001. It was a 960-ton iron tracking calorimeter whose primary purpose was to search for proton decay, although its data were also used to investigate the properties of neutrinos. It found no evidence of proton decay, but it did help confirm Super-Kamiokande's atmospheric neutrino result, supporting the theory of neutrino oscillation.

The Soudan Mine was also home to the MINOS and CDMS detectors.

== History ==
Soudan 2 was the successor to the Soudan 1, a similar 30 ton detector also intended to search for proton decay.

The excavation for Soudan 2 was done in 1984–1985. Installation was started in 1986 and was completed in 1993. The experiment was run from April 1989 to June 2001, beginning with a partial detector of 275 tons. It was disassembled in 2005 to make room for further low background physics experiments, including MINOS.
