= Lake Vermilion =

Lake in the state of Minnesota, United States

- Onamanii-zaaga'iganiing (Ojibwe)
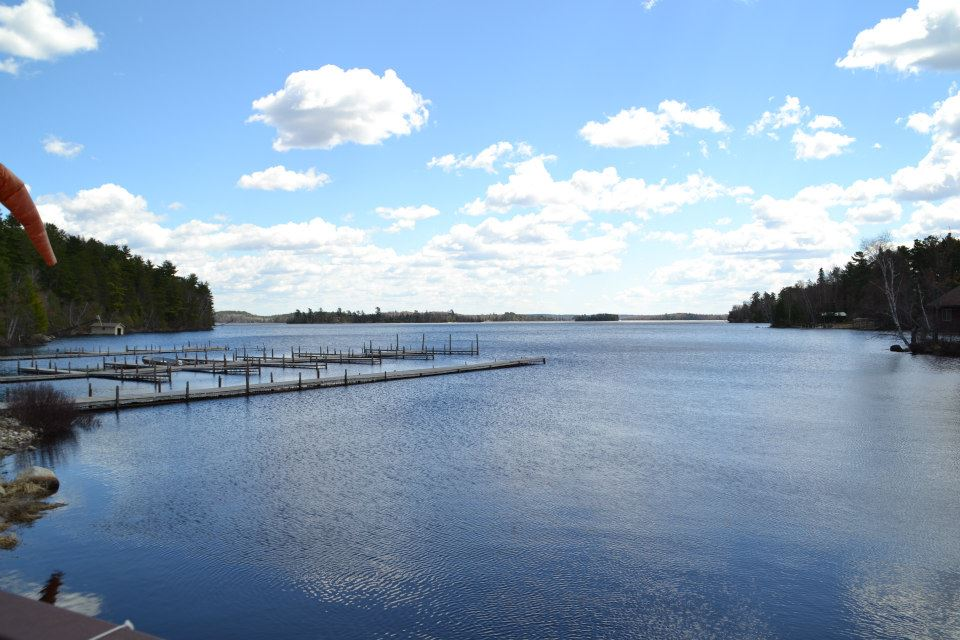
- Lake Vermilion during the day

- Location within Minnesota Location within the United States
- Location: Saint Louis County, Minnesota, United States
- Coordinates: 47°51′28.47″N 92°17′58.60″W
- Primary outflows: Vermilion River
- Basin countries: United States
- Max. length: 24 mi (39 km)
- Max. width: 10.38 mi (16.70 km)
- Surface area: 39,271 acres (158.9 km^{2})
- Average depth: 25 ft (7.6 m)
- Max. depth: 76 ft (23 m)
- Shore length^{1}: 313 mi (504 km)
- Surface elevation: 1,358 ft (414 m)
- Islands: 365
- Settlements: Tower and Cook
- ^{1} Shore length is not a well-defined measure.

Lake Vermilion is a shallow freshwater lake in northeastern Minnesota, United States. The Ojibwe called the lake Onamanii-zaaga'iganiing (occasionally anglicized as Nee-Man-Nee), which means “the evening sun tinting the water a reddish color”. French fur traders translated this as Vermilion, a red color. Lake Vermilion is located between the towns of Tower on the east and Cook on the west, in the heart of Minnesota's Arrowhead Region at Vermilion Iron Range. The area was mined from the late 19th century until the 1960s, and the Soudan Mine operated just south of the lake.

The lake contains black crappie, bluegill, brown bullhead, largemouth bass, muskellunge (muskie), northern pike, pumpkinseed (sunfish), rock bass, smallmouth bass, tullibee (cisco), walleye, white sucker, and yellow perch. Lake Vermilion is known for its walleye and muskie fishing. In the spring of 2005, Lake Vermilion was host to the annual Minnesota Governor’s Fishing Opener Weekend. A four-walleye limit and a 17- to 26-inch protected slot limit took effect on Lake Vermilion in 2006. However, as the population rebounded, a new special regulation for walleye was introduced in May 2017. The new regulation is a 20 to 26 inch protected slot limit, with one fish over 26 inches allowed in a four fish possession limit.

The lake attracts visitors from all parts of Minnesota and the midwestern United States, who lodge at the lake's numerous resorts and hotels. Tourists are drawn by Lake Vermilion's reputation as a fishing destination, as well as its setting in the northern Minnesota wilderness. The lake is near the Superior National Forest and the Boundary Waters Canoe Area Wilderness (BWCAW).

The Minnesota DNR ranks Lake Vermilion as the fifth largest lake by surface area for bodies of water entirely within Minnesota borders. The surface area of Lake Vermilion is 39,271 acres (158.9 km^{2}) and has a maximum depth of 76 feet (23 m). It is located within the southernmost section of the Canadian Shield, and contains more than 365 islands.

Some fish consumption guideline restrictions have, from time-to-time, been placed on some of the lake's fish due to mercury contamination. Consumption of Northern pike and walleye over 15 inches should not exceed twice a week, however vacation fishing consumption is unlimited.

In 2007, Governor Tim Pawlenty announced the state was negotiating the purchase from U.S. Steel of a large area of land on the southeastern shore of the lake for a proposed new Minnesota state park. The sale of the land at a cost of $18 million was finalized in June 2010. Once the land was acquired, a new park was created, which included the purchased parcel and the existing Soudan Underground Mine State Park. The new park is called Lake Vermilion-Soudan Underground Mine State Park.

The Bois Forte Band of Chippewa has a small reservation on the lake, upon which is located Fortune Bay Resort and Casino.

The Stuntz Bay Boathouse Historic District was constructed in the first half of the 20th century by employees of the adjacent Soudan Iron Mine on the shores of the lake.
