= Mohamed Soudan =

Egyptian politician

- Born: 1956 (age 69–70); Alexandria, United Arab Republic (present-day Egypt)
- Political party: Freedom and Justice Party
- Movement: Muslim Brotherhood

Mohamed Soudan (born 1956) is an Egyptian politician who is a senior member of the Muslim Brotherhood Organization and its now defunct political wing, the Freedom and Justice Party (FJP). He was foreign relations secretary underneath previous president, Mohamed Morsi, who was ousted in June 2013 after massive opposition demonstrations. Following the 2013 Egyptian coup, Soudan fled to the U.K., where he has been living ever since.

An Egyptian court has sentenced Soudan, in absentia, to twelve years in prison.

== Early life and education ==
Soudan was born in Alexandria, in June 1956, and joined the Muslim Brotherhood in 1979 following his graduation from the Faculty of Engineering at Alexandria University. He held various positions in the Brotherhood as he climbed the ladder through the years, and he played an integral part in forming the Freedom and Justice Party after Hosni Mubarak's early 2011 ousting.

== Egyptian Revolution ==
Soudan proclaimed he had played an "active part" in the Egyptian Revolution of 2011. In an interview he stated:

"There is no question that the MB [Muslim Brotherhood] was the organizer of the revolution, because we were the only group with the capability to organize people on a mass scale. The mosques – and specifically Friday prayers – were a focal point for mobilization."

Further in the interview, Soudan asserted, "The Muslim Brotherhood has a coherent plan to change and fix society. We won't want to force the people to pray. Egypt can only become Islamic in a gradual fashion."

== Freedom and Justice Party ==
In 2011, the Freedom and Justice Party was founded as the political wing of the Brotherhood following Hosni Mubarak's overthrow. The group subsequently took over leadership of Egypt and its candidate, Mohamed Morsi, was elected president. Like the Brotherhood, its foundation is based on strictly conservative Sharia – or Islamic – law. The FJP was officially shut down by an Egyptian Court in August 2014, eight months after the government declared the Brotherhood a terrorist organization. BBC reported:

"It was accused of orchestrating a wave of violence to destabilise the country after the military overthrew President Mohammed Morsi in July 2013 [...] Saturday's ruling by the Cairo Administrative Court came after a report by its advisory panel that noted the FJP's leaders had been accused, and in some cases convicted, of murder and inciting violence."

== Muslim Brotherhood's controversial history ==
The Muslim Brotherhood is a Sunni Islamist organization created in Egypt in 1928 by Hassan al-Banna. BBC stated that:

"The movement initially aimed simply to spread Islamic morals and good words, but soon became involved in politics, particularly the fight to rid Egypt of British colonial control and cleanse it of all Western influence.

While the Ikhwan [Brotherhood] say that they support democratic principles, one of the group's stated aims is to create a state ruled by Islamic law, or Sharia. Its most famous slogan, used worldwide, is: 'Islam is the solution.'"

One of the Brotherhood's most notable and famous theorists, Sayyid Qutb – labeled by The Washington Post as the Brotherhood's "intellectual godfather" – was widely understood to be one of the main inspirations for Osama bin Laden. Qutb's famous book, "Milestones", became a "classic manifesto of the terrorist wing of Islamic fundamentalism", according to The New York Times. Qutb also served as an inspiration to bin Laden's successor and current leader of Al-Qaeda, Ayman Al-Zawahiri, who has frequently quoted Qutb in his own writings.

The Egyptian government designated the Brotherhood as a terrorist organization in December 2013. As of February 2017, the Trump administration was considering whether to designate the Brotherhood as a foreign terrorist organization, stemming from the group's long history with violence. The group has links to terrorist actors and organizations including its Palestinian branch, Hamas, as well as Al-Qaeda.

=== Review of Brotherhood activities in the UK ===
In 2014, World Media Services, publisher of the Brotherhood's Ikhwaan Press, set up a location in a nondescript London suburb, keeping a low profile given the Egyptian government's pursuit to arrest and sentence members of the organization.

Al Jazeera reported that the Brotherhood's activities in London "caused concern in Britain", and that David Cameron – then prime minister – "commissioned an internal government review into the philosophy and activities of the Muslim Brotherhood" to ultimately probe any "path of extremism and violent extremism, what its connections are with other groups, what its presence is here in the United Kingdom."

Britain's foreign and domestic intelligence services, MI6 and MI5, were to aid in the investigation of violent activities by the Brotherhood, along with its senior leaders – such as Soudan – living in the U.K.

=== Statements on Muslim Brotherhood ===
In 2012, Soudan addressed the Brotherhood's stance on interpretation of Islam, and said that while they do not wish to establish an Islamic state, they ultimately prefer "a slower and more moderate way. With alcohol, for instance, Soudan said he'd rather it not be sold, but recognizes it's big business."

Since Morsi's overthrow, the Brotherhood has been warring with the current government and President Abdel-Fattah Al-Sisi, who declared that the Brotherhood is welcome to resume participation in the political scene, only under the conditions that "they decide to renounce violence."

Soudan commented on the Brotherhood's involvement in the conflict in a 2014 statement:

"The Muslim Brotherhood and the Alliance did not and will not stop participation in the revolutionary movement – until the bloody military junta is fully defeated and completely ousted, and fair retribution is achieved."

In a February 2017 press statement, somewhat contradictory to his earlier proclamation, Soudan said:

"Violence has no place in the Muslim Brotherhood's chosen and established approach or in its ideology. We always condemn violence as a means to solve problems or stop oppressors."
