= Soudan 1 =

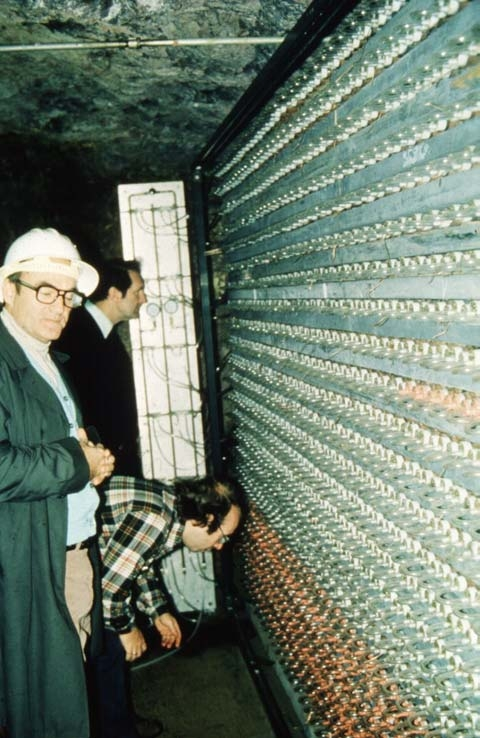
Tom Fields of Argonne National Lab (standing, left), Don Perkins of Oxford University (standing, center), and Marvin Marshak of Univ of Minnesota (bending, center) next to the Soudan 1 proton decay experiment in the Soudan Mine, Minnesota.

Soudan 1 was a particle detector located in the Soudan Mine in Northern Minnesota, United States, which operated for a year in 1981–82. It was a 30-ton tracking calorimeter whose primary purpose was to search for proton decay. It set a lower limit on the lifetime of the proton of 1.6×10^{30} years as well as upper limits on the density of magnetic monopoles. It also served as a prototype for the following Soudan 2 and MINOS experiments.

== Design and operation ==
Soudan 1 was installed 590 meters below the surface and brought into routine operation in August 1981 by high-energy physics research groups from the University of Minnesota and Argonne National Laboratory. The detector was a 3×3×2m^{3} block of iron oxide-loaded concrete instrumented with 3456 gas proportional tubes. It was surrounded on five sides by a veto shield of solid scintillator, which was completed in October 1981. This allowed events which might otherwise have looked like proton decay, but were actually caused by cosmic rays, to be discarded. It had a total running time of 0.97 years.

== See also ==
- Particle physics
- Proton decay
