= Buyck family =

Long-standing family in the Benelux region

Buyck
- Noble family
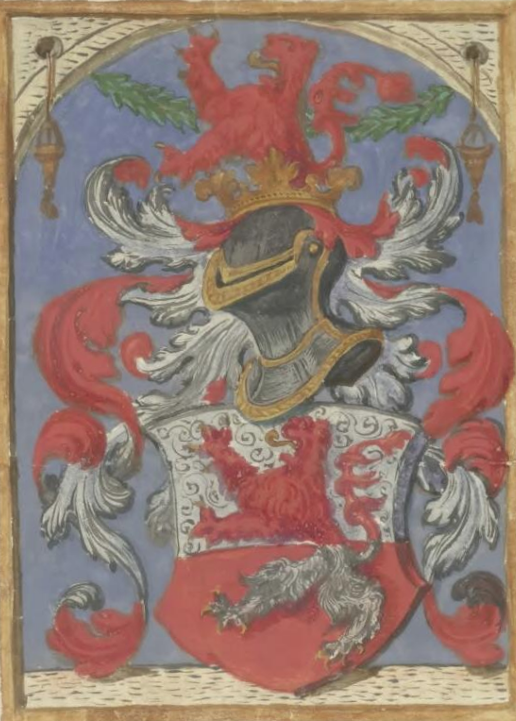
- Buyck Coat of Arms
- Country: Kingdom of Belgium
- Current region: Flanders, Belgium
- Founded: ±1350 (Flanders)
- Founder: Jan Buyck
- Titles: Knighthood; Order of the Crown; Order of Leopold; Legion of Honour
- Motto: Ainsy Dieu Plaist

The Buyck family (spelling variant: Buijck) is a noble Belgian family which can trace its origins back to the 14th century.

Several members have held or hold roles in politics, business and economics, architecture, as well as in the military field. Whilst first documented notable position was Jan Buyck, Flanders' first Admiral in 1383, the family was granted a heraldic title in 1521 and is credited with co-founding the world's first publicly listed company.

The family has a long history and served close to the monarchies in the region of Flanders and the Low Countries, a region that spans today’s countries of Belgium, Netherlands and Luxembourg, as well as links to the Scottish and English crowns. Different descendants have been instated to national orders from the Kingdom of Belgium and knighthood: more specifically to the Order of the Crown, the Order of Leopold, and the Legion of Honour.

Contemporary members of the Buyck family can be found active in Belgian diplomacy, business, and remains recognized for real estate development and architecture. To the present day the family maintains its institutionalized commitment to philanthropy internationally.

== Titles and heraldry ==
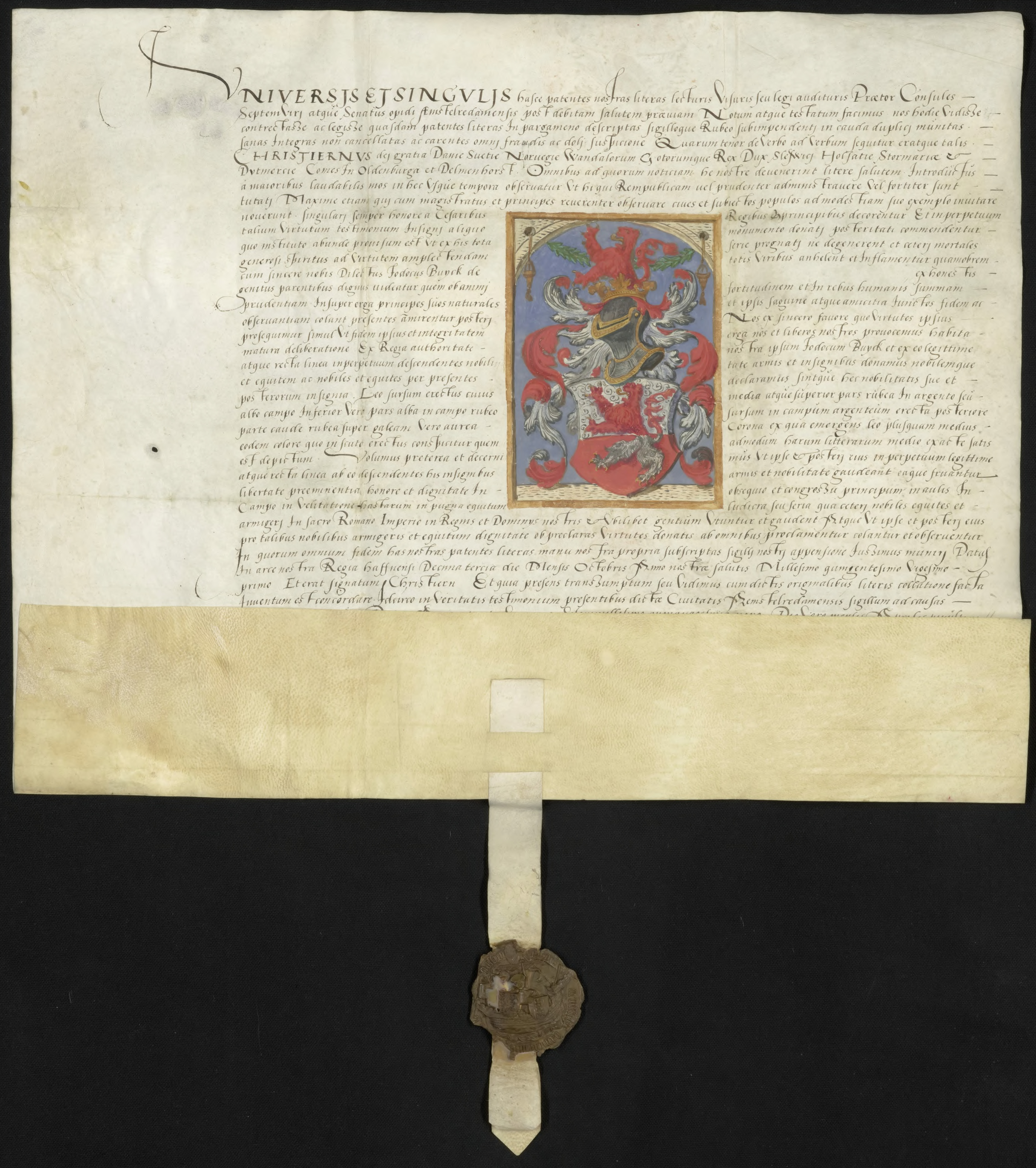
Title of heraldry Buyck with vidimus (1521)

=== Knighthood ===
In 1521, the Buyck family was granted a title of nobility, knighted, by King Christian of Denmark, according to the laws of heraldry. The King of Arms had the power to assign coats of arms and verify genealogies and noble titles. The knighthood and coat of arms was once again affirmed upon the family by Holy Roman Emperor Archduke Ferdinand I in 1534.

=== Coat of arms and motto ===
The coat of arms is a diamond-shaped shield, bisected blue-grey and red, over a lion from one to the other. The earliest reproduction that is still in storage today is the coat of arms as found on the letter from King Christian of Denmark. Later also on the cover of Elisabeth Buyck’s Album Amicorum.

The heraldic family motto is in the old French language spelling: « Ainsy Dieu Plaist » (modern spelling: « ainsi dieu plaît »), translating to « as it pleases to God ».

== Etymology ==
The origins of the family name are Flemish. They are from a derivative of the ancient Germanic personal name Burghard (see Burkhart) and can compare with the German Buck. It is also found under a Dutch variant, mostly archaic Buijk or Buik.

The Germanic Burkhart originates from the medieval personal name Burkhard from ancient Germanic Burghard. This is composed of the elements "burg" standing for ‘fort castle’ and "hard" as for 'hardy', 'brave' or 'strong’.

== Military ==
The Buyck family has a history of political involvement and was first recorded for its role in military and in politics thereafter.

=== Jean Buyck, Flanders' first Admiral ===
Jean (Jan in Flemish) Buyck was a knight, born in Flanders in the 14th century, and commander of the Flemish fleet. He originated from the County of Flanders (also known as Comté de Flandre in French), also known as "Royal Flanders". For centuries, the estates around the cities of Ghent, Bruges and Ypres formed one of the most affluent regions in Europe.

Jean Buyck was missioned to protect the maritime commerce, in particular from attacks orchestrated by Charles VI, he led the Franco-Flemish fleet. On 25 March 1387, in a battle near the River Thames estuary in the English Channel the captain of the Flemish fleet, Jean Buyck, was taken prisoner. In view of the seaman's gradation in Flanders, Duke Philip the Bold offered the English to exchange him for the natural brother of the King of Portugal who had been taken by the French. But the English, remembering the many damages that this captain had caused them, refused this exchange. This battle took place at the mouth of the Thames where we see the Spanish ships fighting as they had previously done side by side with those of Flanders

=== Robert Buyck ===
Robert Buyck served the Belgian marines and is commemorated for falling at sea in saving a vessel in distress. In 1927, a Brussels’ street was named after him in commemoration.

== Political (renaissance) ==
=== Joost Sijbrandtszoon Buyck ===
In the early modern period, the Buyck family was a wealthy Amsterdam family. Marriages with other prominent traders occurred including families Occo and Heereman van Zuydtwijk.

Several of Buyck family members held important positions in Amsterdam's city council. The most noted member is Joost Sijbrandtszoon Buyck (1505–1588), who served a record seventeen terms as one of the mayors of Amsterdam in the period 1549–1577. He will be sworn in by King Philip II of Spain in 1549. He joined the city counsel at the age of 24 and was recognized as catholic.

Records of Amsterdam’s land register show polders attributed to the Buyck family. He was father to three children, Gerbrand, Jacob and Cornelis.

It was the Alteratie that brought the ruling of Joost Buyck over the catholic "vroedschap" (the city-council) to an end. On 26 May 1578, 24 city-council members were forced to leave Amsterdam. The revolt escorted the council to the Damrak, where barges had been prepared to take them out of Amsterdam. They settled in Haarlem or Leiden or quietly returned later on.

Buyck family portraits
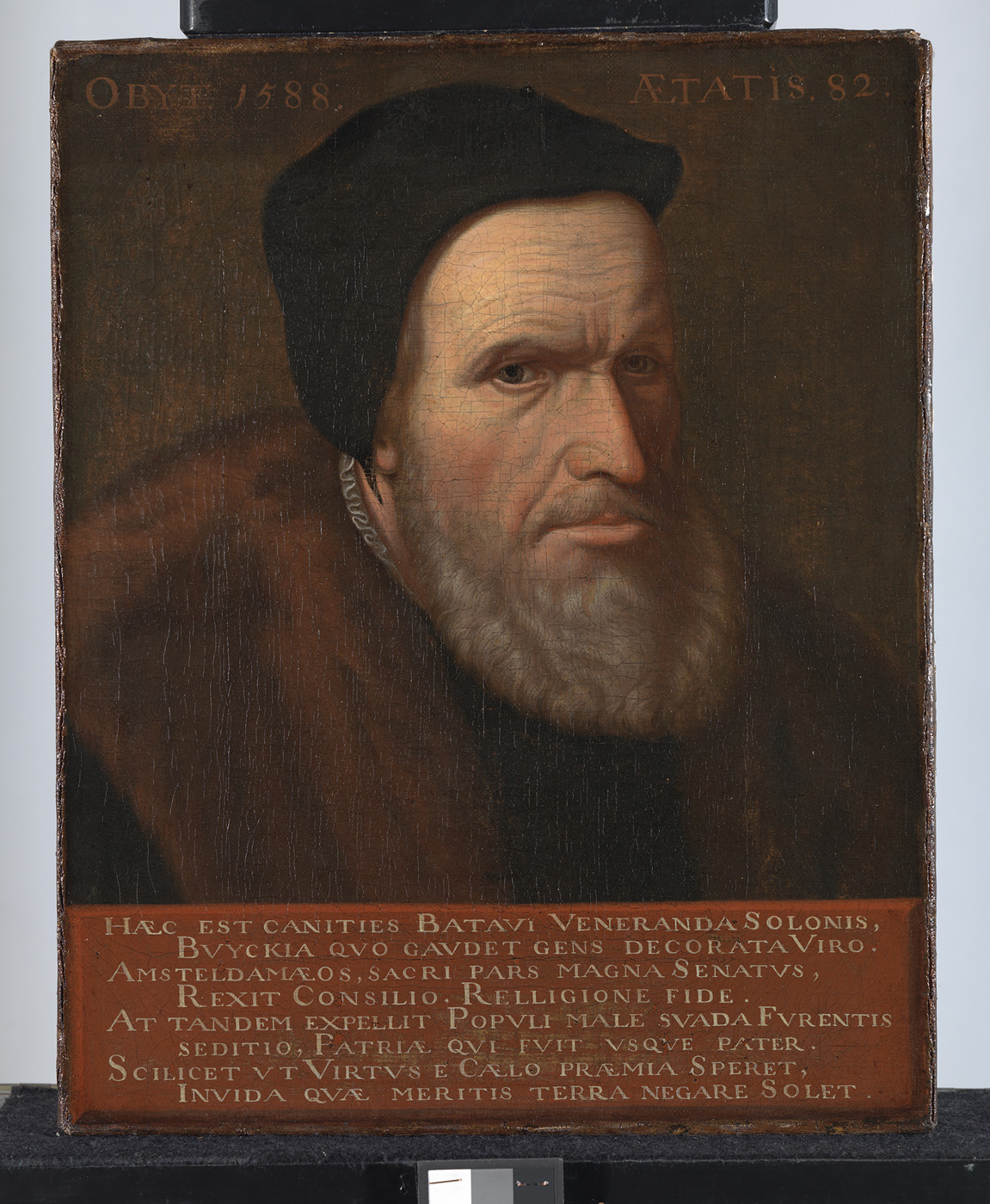
Portrait of Joost Buyck, Amsterdam mayor seated with a fur coat around his shoulders. Painting after the etching by Jean Muller (1578). Amsterdam Historical Museum.

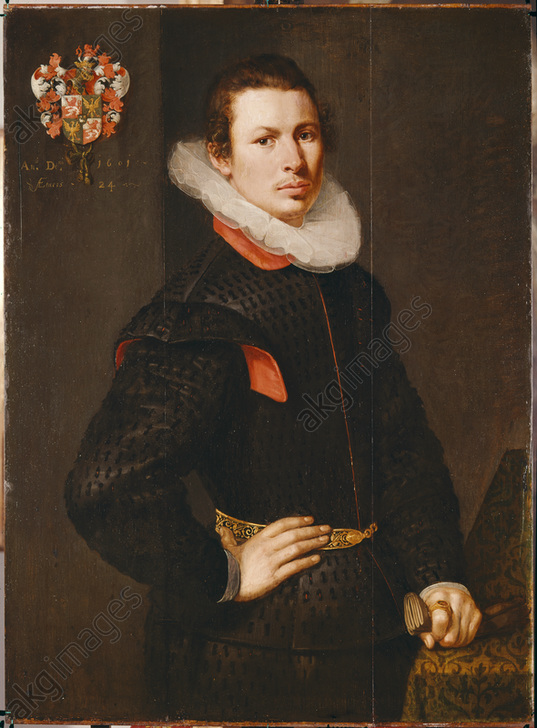
Portrait of Gerbrandt Buyck, oil on wood by Ketel, Cornelis (1601). Leipzig, Museum der Bildenden Künste.

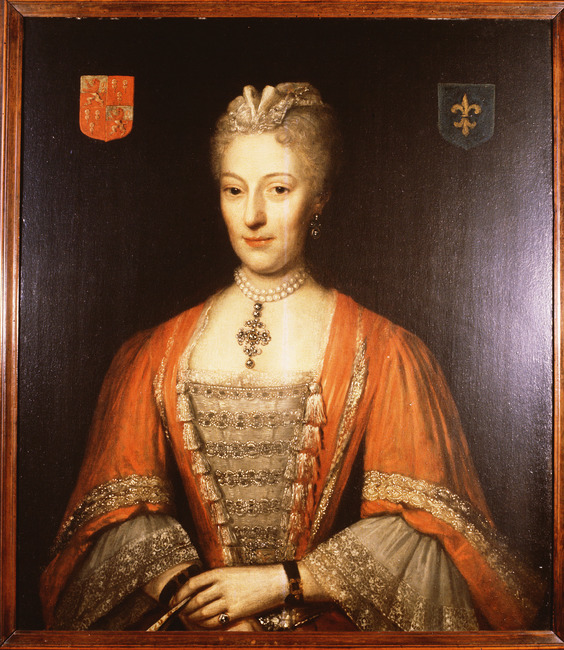
Granddaughter Cornelia Elisabeth Buyck, painted by Wilhelm Hermann Warnar (1716). Private collection.

== First joint-stock company in the world ==
=== Hendrick Buyck ===
A successful merchant and co-founder of the first stock-listed company Hendrick Buyck was born 1551 (buried in Amsterdam, 1613) brother to Joost Buyck, the Amsterdam mayor, and Jacob Buyck, the last pastor of the Oude Kerck, who fought against the Alteration.

=== Co-founding the Dutch East India Company (V.O.C.) ===
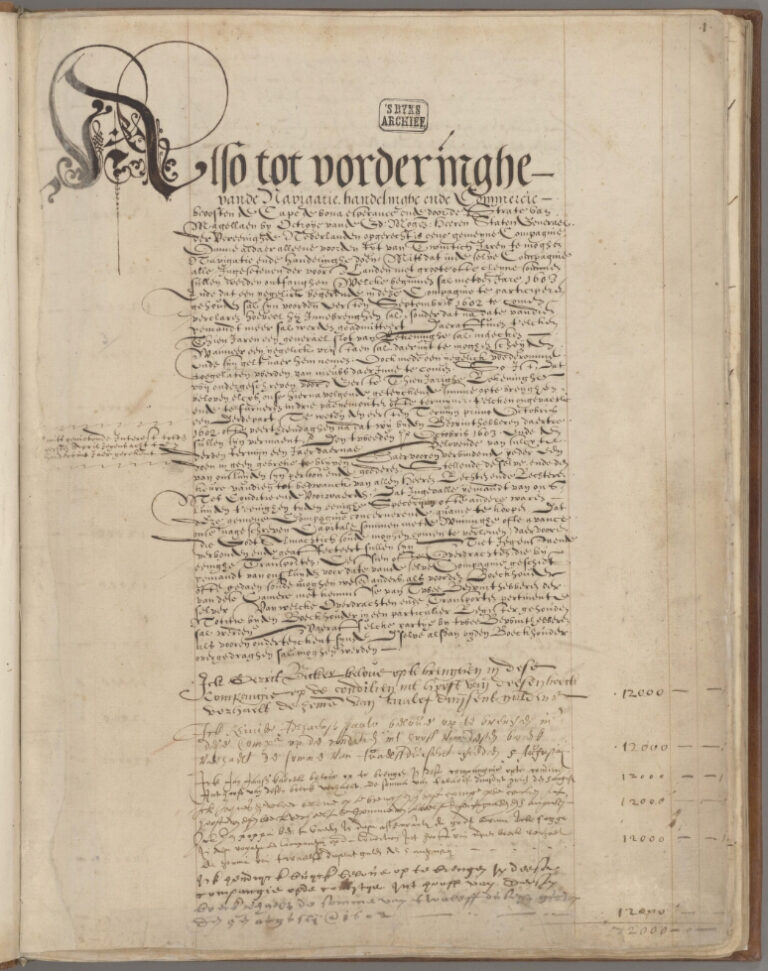
First page of V.O.C. capital subscription ledger (Amsterdam branch; August 1602).

Hendrick Buyck co-founded the Compagnie van Verre (long-distance company) known today as the first and forerunner "companie" that would later establish and unite as the Dutch East India Company (V.O.C. or Verenigde Oost Indische Compagnie). He was part of a company of nine merchants, who had organized a fleet to Java.

All the nine merchants each invested 12'000 guilders: the present value their contribution could buy six canal-side houses in early seventeenth-century Amsterdam. All those that met in the Warmoesstraat (Amsterdam), in May 1594 became "bewinthebbers", the equivalent of "bewindvoerders" or administrators today.

The first page of the V.O.C. capital subscription ledger contains the provision that shares in the V.O.C. could be traded, a prerequisite that made it to be the first joint-stock company. At the foot of the page, the entries of director Hendrick Buyck can be seen.

The management was organized as such to have six "chambers" ("kamers"), of those governing those chambers all administrators were partaking: they were known as the XVIII Lords ("Heren XVIII"), which included Hendrick Buyck. The company was nationalized in 1795.

== Diplomatic ==
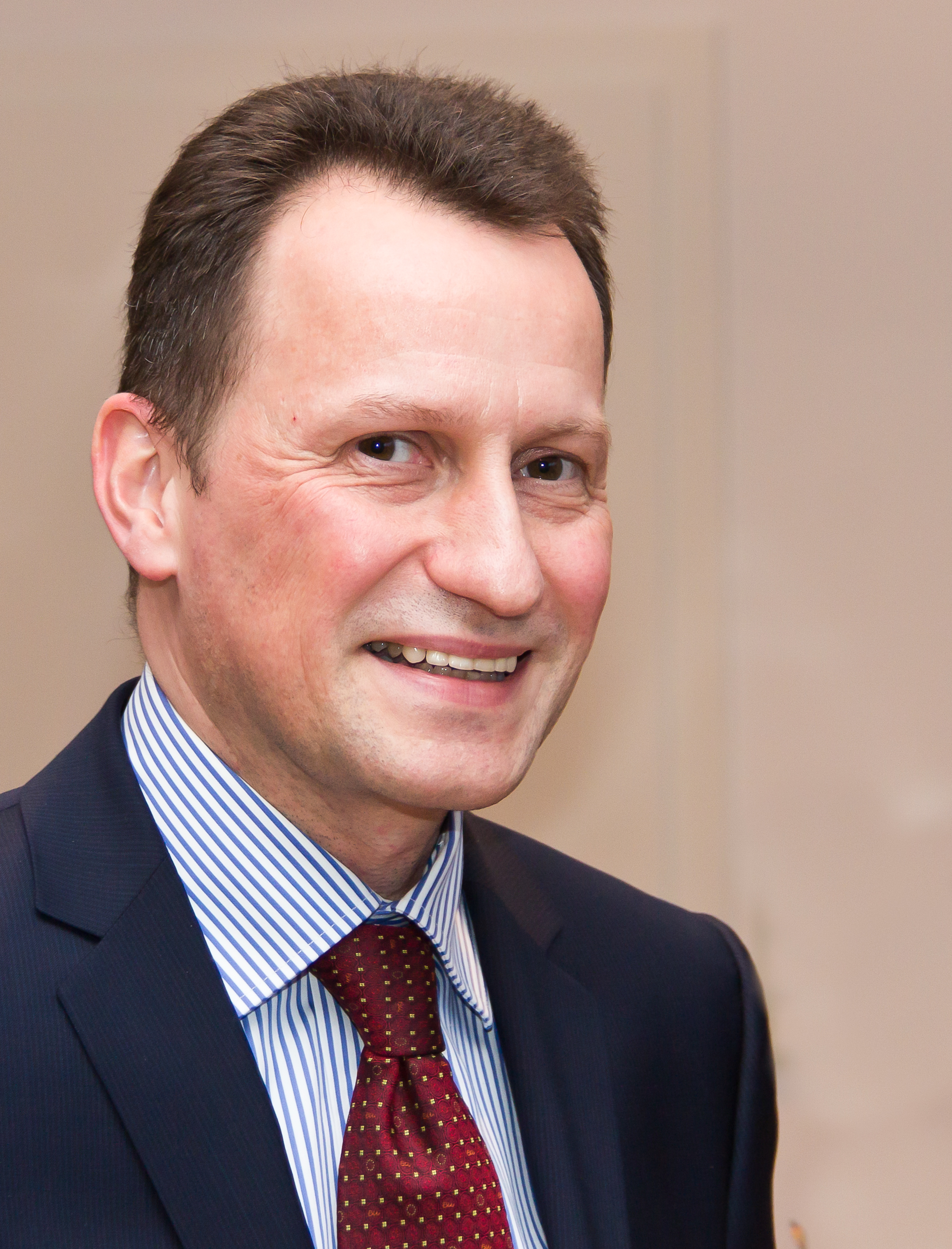
Nicolaas Buyck (2013)

=== Counsel for foreign affairs ===
In 1997, by royal decree, the relevance of the steelworks' business led to the appointment as counsel for foreign affairs, to the Belgian Vice Prime Minister, Foreign Affairs and Finance Minister.

=== Nicolaas Buyck ===
Originally from Eeklo, Belgium, in times gone by, from 1684 and 1717, Louis Angebert Buyck was already mayor of the said city.

Nicolaas Buyck is a seasoned diplomat with his first assignment dating back to 1990. He currently serves as Belgian ambassador to Croatia. The Embassy in Zagreb is responsible for Croatia, Bosnia and Herzegovina and Slovenia.

Under his tenure His Excellency established honorary consulates in the cities of Dubrovnik, Opatija and Split. His previous functions as ambassador include his diplomatic posting in Estonia. Nicolaas Buyck first mission was in Kongo-Brazzaville, and was previously posted as ambassador to Tallinn, Estonia in 2008.

== Artistic & Cultural ==
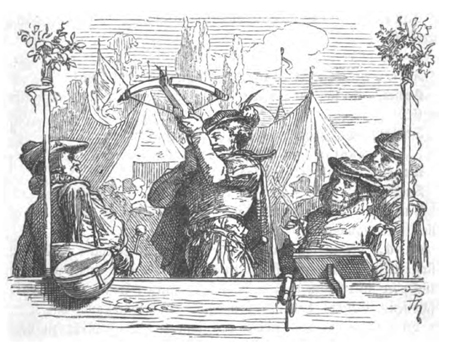
Crossbow shooting. Buyck, military man under Egmont, shoots four rings black.

=== Goethe's Egmont ===
Johann Wolfgang von Goethe's 1788 theatre play Egmont contains a "Hollander" by the name of Buyck who reports to the Count of Egmont.

=== Private library of Jacob Buyck ===
The private library of Jacob Buyck, a theologian from Amsterdam from the 16th century, is considered to be an exceptional collection at the time. The library was assembled between 1573 and 1599, and consists of over 1000 books. In 1632, the library was assimilated with the municipal Library of Amsterdam, making it twice as large. Most of the books are still present at the Special Collections Department, mostly in original condition, and there are a few manuscripts of Jacob Buyck himself, including a handwritten catalogue of his library. The content reflects the social and mental world of a conservative, catholic intellectual living in Amsterdam in a turbulent period of Dutch history.

=== Painting ===
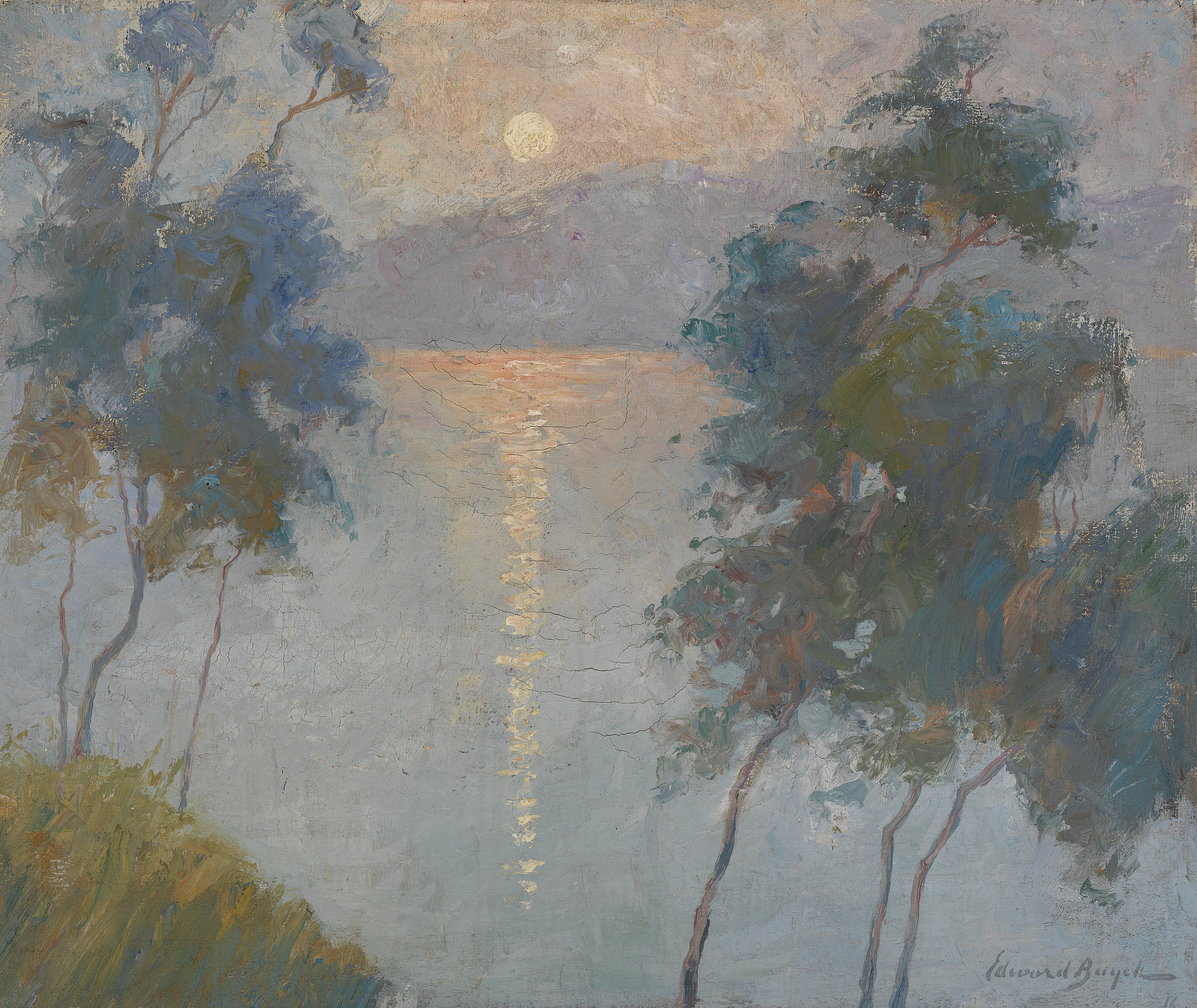
Edward Buyck, Early Morning in the Catskills, 1916, oil on canvas.

Edouard Pierre August Vincent Buyck was a Brugge-born (1888) painter that was active in New York, United States, passing in 1960. Buyck emigrated to the United States during World War I after he was wounded fighting with the Belgium forces.

He practiced lithography, oil painting and etching with prominent pieces found in the Smithsonian American Art Museum. A fire in his studio, in Slingerlands, New York, in 1940 caused many of his works to be lost.

Several artworks were commissioned and include the portrait of Franklin D. Roosevelt which went on display in the White House. Other notable portraits include that of Charles Poletti as justice of the New York Supreme Court.

== Commerce ==
=== Textile ===
Carolus De Buyck had a cotton weavery in the Augustijnenklooster, together with his father-in-law Gerardus Vanderwaerden, owning a cotton printing house on Sint-Margrietstraat, in Ghent, Belgium.

In a list draw in 1807 containing the 100 most wealthy citizens of Ghent contained 16 weavers, highlighting the importance in the 19th century.

=== Printing ===
In the same Flemish city of Ghent the family owned a printing company at the turn of the 20th century.

== Architecture ==
The family is known to have bequeathed the Belgium architectural landscape, dating back to 18th century.

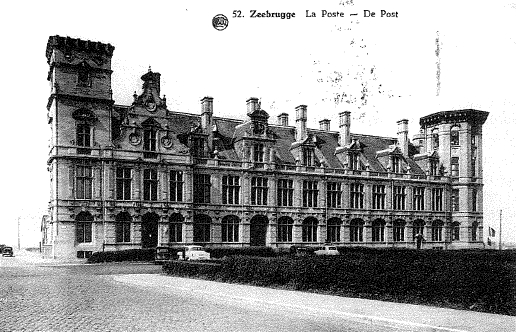
'State Building', Zeebrugge, Belgium by René Buyck

=== Neorenaissance ===
It was Jean-François Buyck (1761–1836), which worked in the United Kingdom of the Netherlands as a supervisor of bridges, roads and watercourses, in the administration of the Rijkswaterstaat.

From 1831 until 1841 his son Pierre Buyck was employed by the city of Bruges, under the direction of city architect Jean-Brunon Rudd. He also became a teacher at the Bruges academy.

In 1842, Pierre Buyck succeeded Jean-Augustin Van Caneghem, as he was appointed provincial architect in West Flanders, responsible for the districts of Bruges, Ostend, Veurne and Diksmuide. The 1876-built castle, intended as a countryside family residence, is now classified as architectural heritage in Flanders.

It was his son René Buyck that succeeded him in architecture, building numerous projects for the Flemish authorities. He is recognized for his Neo-gothic and Neo-romantic style. He is known to have designed the largest state administrative building at time in Zeebrugge, built in 1914.

=== Contemporary architecture ===
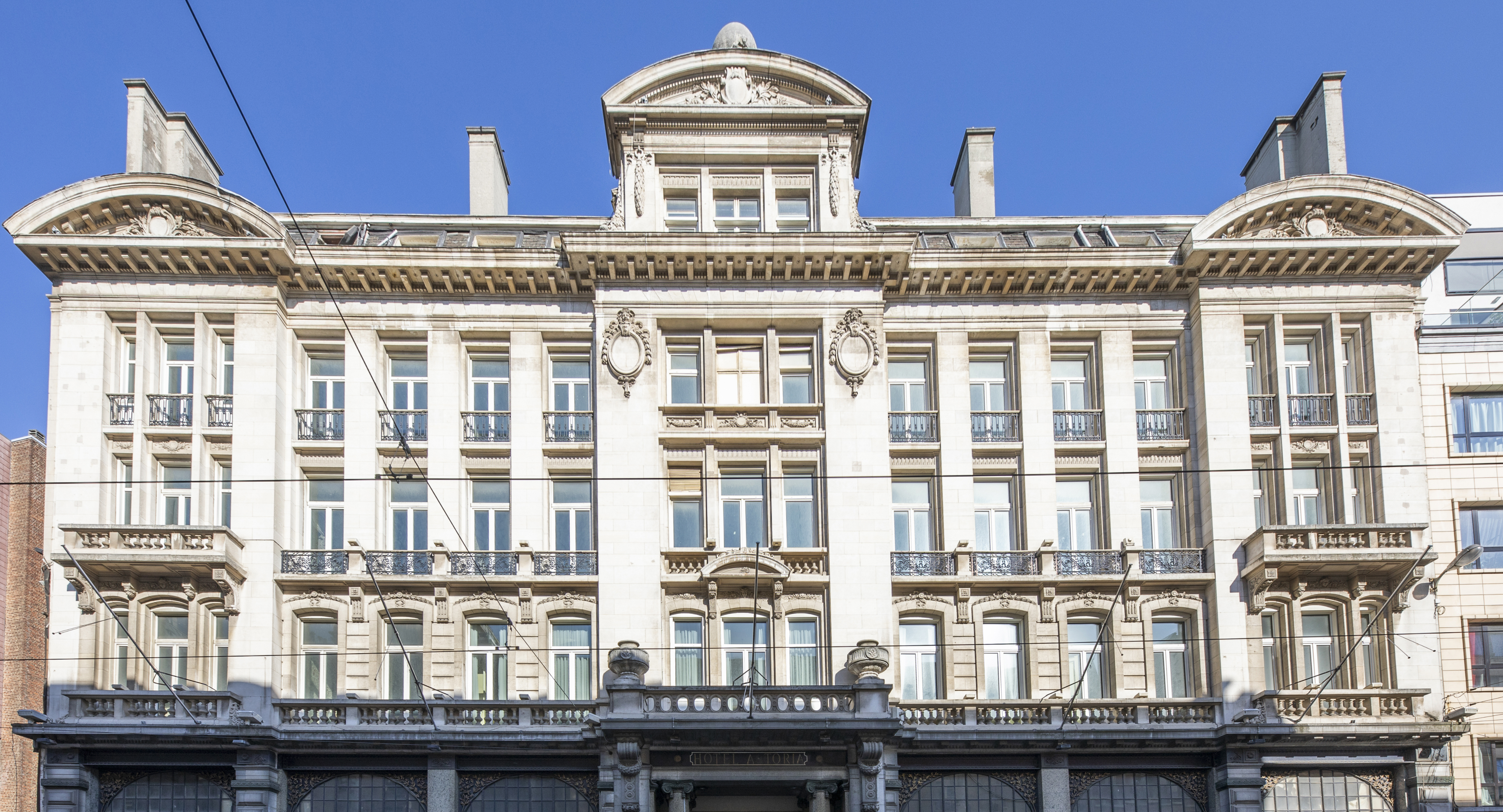
Hotel Astoria, Brussels (2020)

Tony Buyck, is a well known architect based in Brussels. He established the recognized firm ARCHI-BURO architects in 1972 after he graduated from Ghent university college St Lukas.

As architect he built experience in designing the Cairo Garden City Center in Egypt, and in Belgium BMW and Mercedes show-rooms and over 100 private owned estates. He is recognized by his avant-garde style.

Tony Buyck is an acknowledged member of the board of College of Urbanism of the Brussels-Capital Region, to which he was first appointed in 2003.

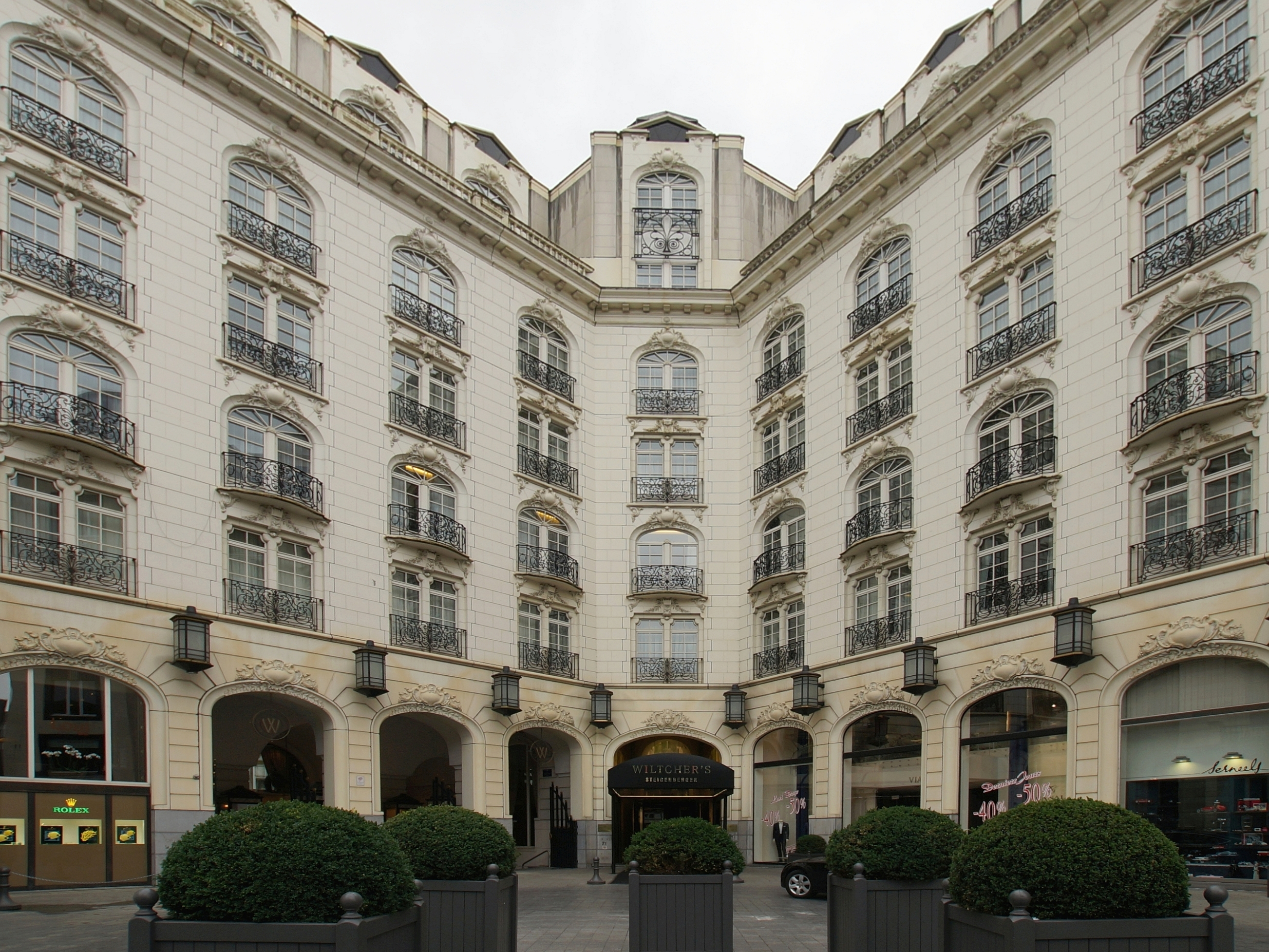
Steigenberger Wiltcher's (2017)

In Brussels Tony Buyck is known to have facilitated the reposition of several hotels, principally through renovation. This includes the Hotel Astoria twice as well as several building adjacent to the Grand Place, for the Hotel Le Dixseptième, all part of UNESCO heritage.

His office also facilitated the transaction of the Steinberger Wiltcher, which succeeded operations from Hilton in the AG Real Estate-owned asset in 2012. The firm acted as advisor to Deutsche Hospitality, an umbrella brand of the German hotel company Steigenberger Hotels.

The Beaux Arts-style hotel was a Conrad until 2012. After a big renovation unveiled in March 2015, the hotel changed its name to Steigenberger Wiltcher's.

=== Construction steelworks ===
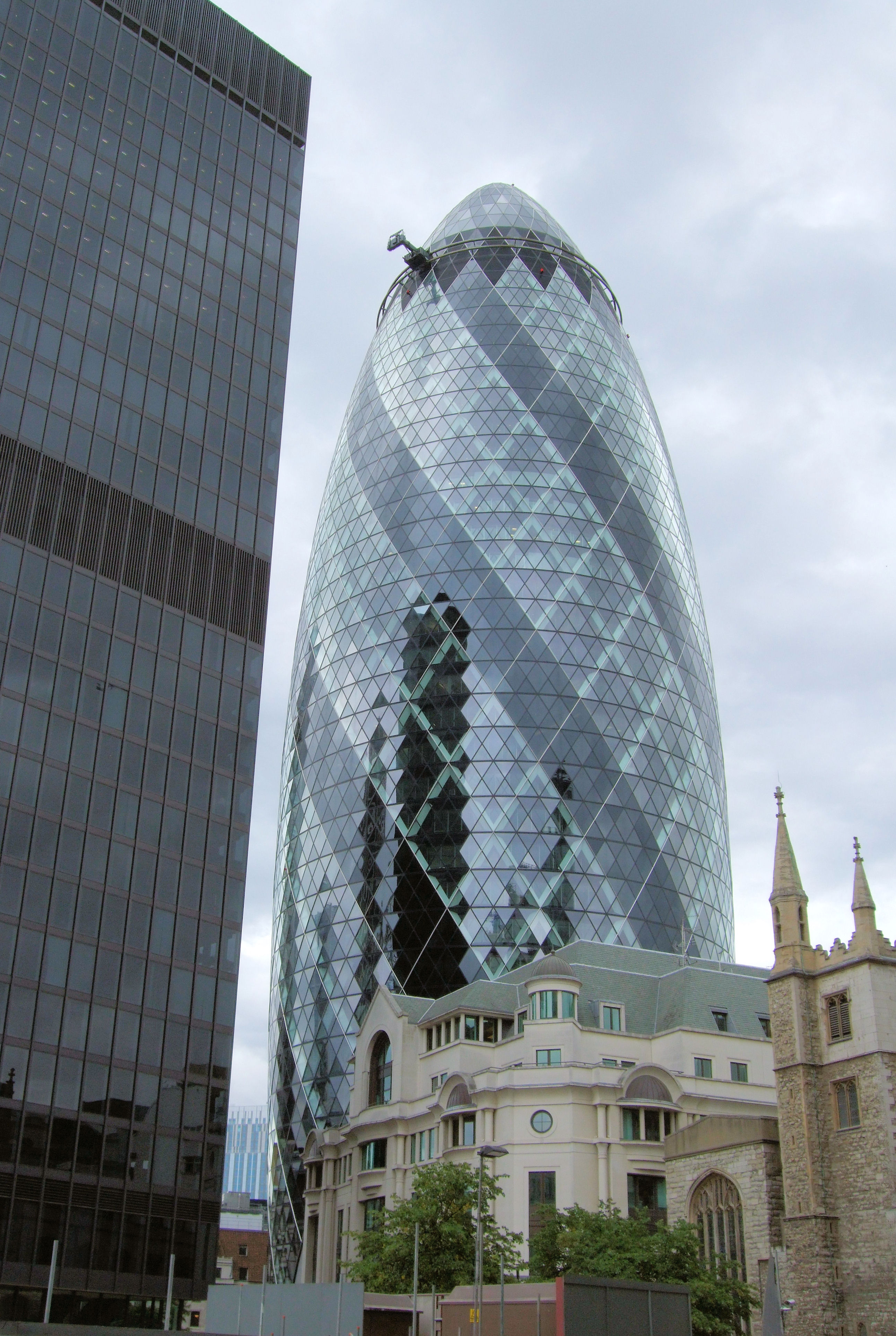
The Gherkin, a steel structure by Victor Buyck (2003)

Victor Buyck Steel Construction is named after its founder who established the business in 1927 near Ghent, Belgium. Initially Victor Buyck manufactured small machines for local businesses and farmers before moving into the construction of aircraft hangars, sheds and outbuildings.

Following World War II, much of Europe’s road and rail infrastructure needed to be replaced. Victor’s son John took over the business: today Victor Buyck is divided into two separate business sectors: infrastructure and buildings.

The company has also established operations in Seremban, Malaysia. The Malaysian business operates independently of Europe and about 85% of its work comes from local projects. The company is also active in other countries in Asia including Australia and Singapore.

Most prominently, in Europe, the Gherkin, built-to-suit for the Swiss Re was built by Victor Buyck with construction starting in 2001. The 40-sotrey structure contains 100'000 tonnes of steel and stands at 180 meter, the second tallest structure of the London Square Mile.

In the Grand Duchy of Luxembourg the firm was recognized during the 2015 steel construction awards, more specifically for the KPMG headquarters. The firm has also known for building a temporary structure allowing for the Adolphe bridge in city.

== Logomachy ==
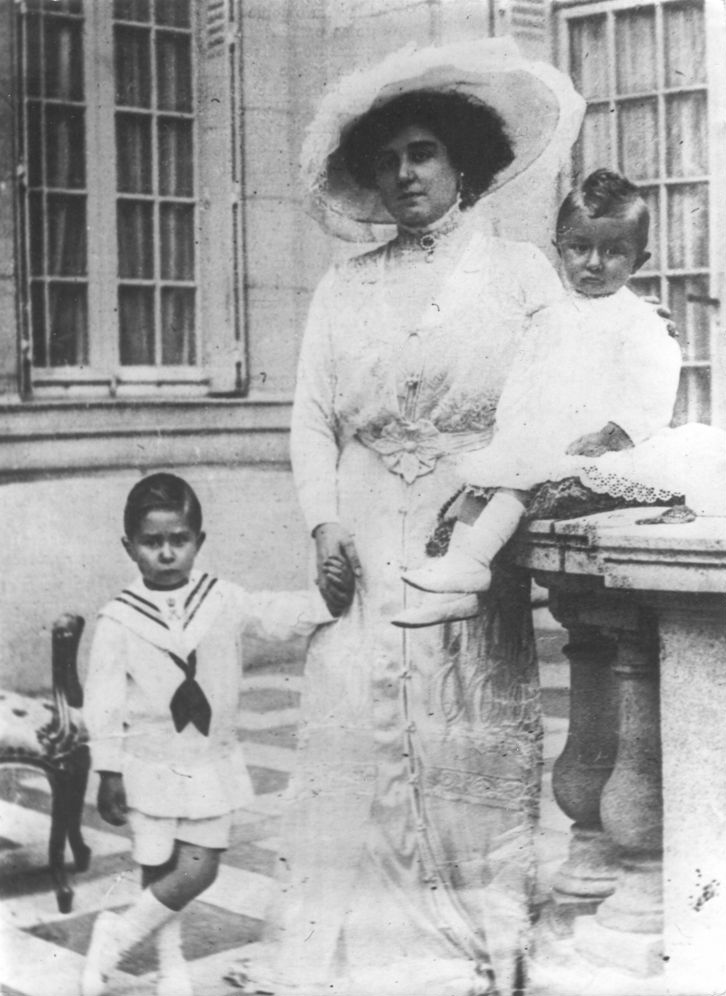
Baroness Vaughan and children, Caroline Lacroix and her children, Lucien, Duke of Tervuren and Philippe, Count of Ravenstein (1910).

In 1991, after acquiring the private residence of Baroness Vaughan, Queen to Leopold II of Belgium, the Buyck family attracted dispute over the property.

The Brussels' mansion had seen Guy Cudell fail to acquire the property. In a bid to have the Buyck family turn in the asset, the Brussels' Mayor initiated an eviction procedure. Guy Cudell started the process on the grounds that the compulsory purchase was in the public interest.

The Buyck family called upon Belgian royal family's support to fight the procedure. The planning process initiated by the city administration was investigated by the cabinet and diplomatic advisors to the King Albert II of Belgium. They found it contained irregularities causing the eviction proceedings to be invalidated.

The ownership has since been retained by the Buyck family. To protect the neoclassical property it was recorded as monumental heritage for Brussels in 1993 and later recognized as Belgian monumental heritage in 1994.
