= Lake Vermilion-Soudan Underground Mine State Park =

- Soudan Iron Mine
- U.S. National Register of Historic Places
- U.S. National Historic Landmark
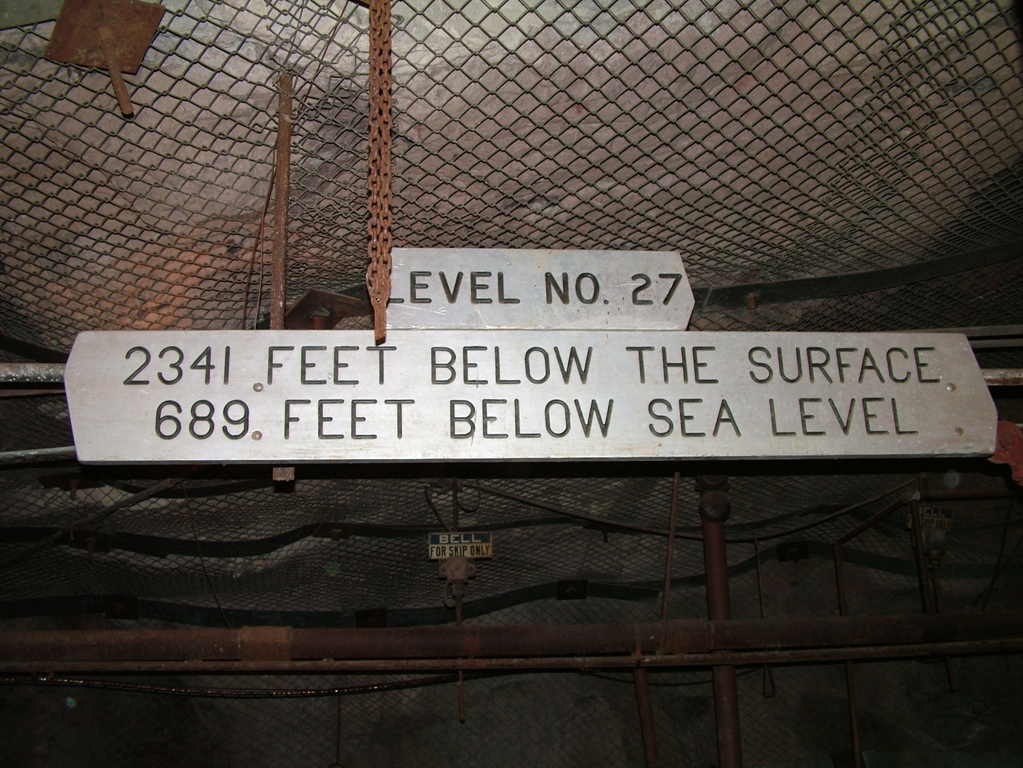
- The 27th level of the Soudan Mine

- Location within Minnesota Location within the United States
- Location: Tower-Soudan State Park, Breitung Township, St. Louis County, Minnesota
- Nearest city: Tower, Minnesota
- Coordinates: 47°49′24″N 92°14′14″W
- Area: 122 hectares (301 acres)
- Built: 1900
- Website: Lake Vermilion-Soudan Underground Mine State Park
- NRHP reference No.: 66000905

Significant dates
- Added to NRHP: November 13, 1966
- Designated NHL: November 13, 1966

The Lake Vermilion-Soudan Underground Mine State Park is a Minnesota state park at the site of the Soudan Underground Mine, on the south shore of Lake Vermilion, in the Vermilion Range (Minnesota). The mine is known as Minnesota's oldest, deepest, and richest iron mine. It formerly hosted the Soudan Underground Laboratory. As the Soudan Iron Mine, it has been designated a U.S. National Historic Landmark.

== History ==
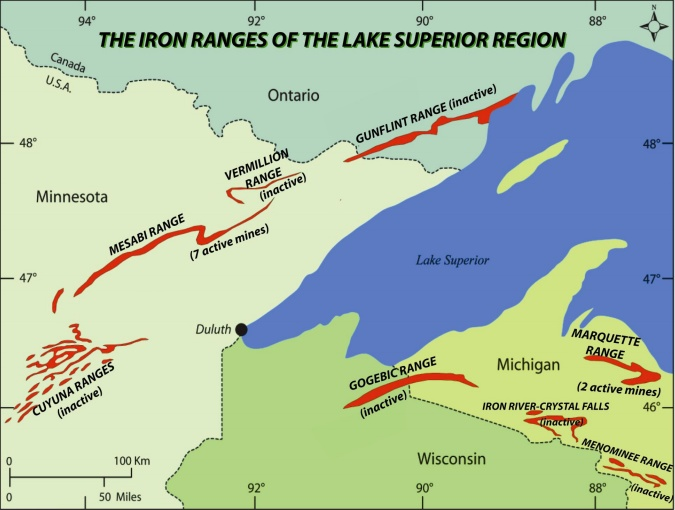
Lake Superior Iron Ranges

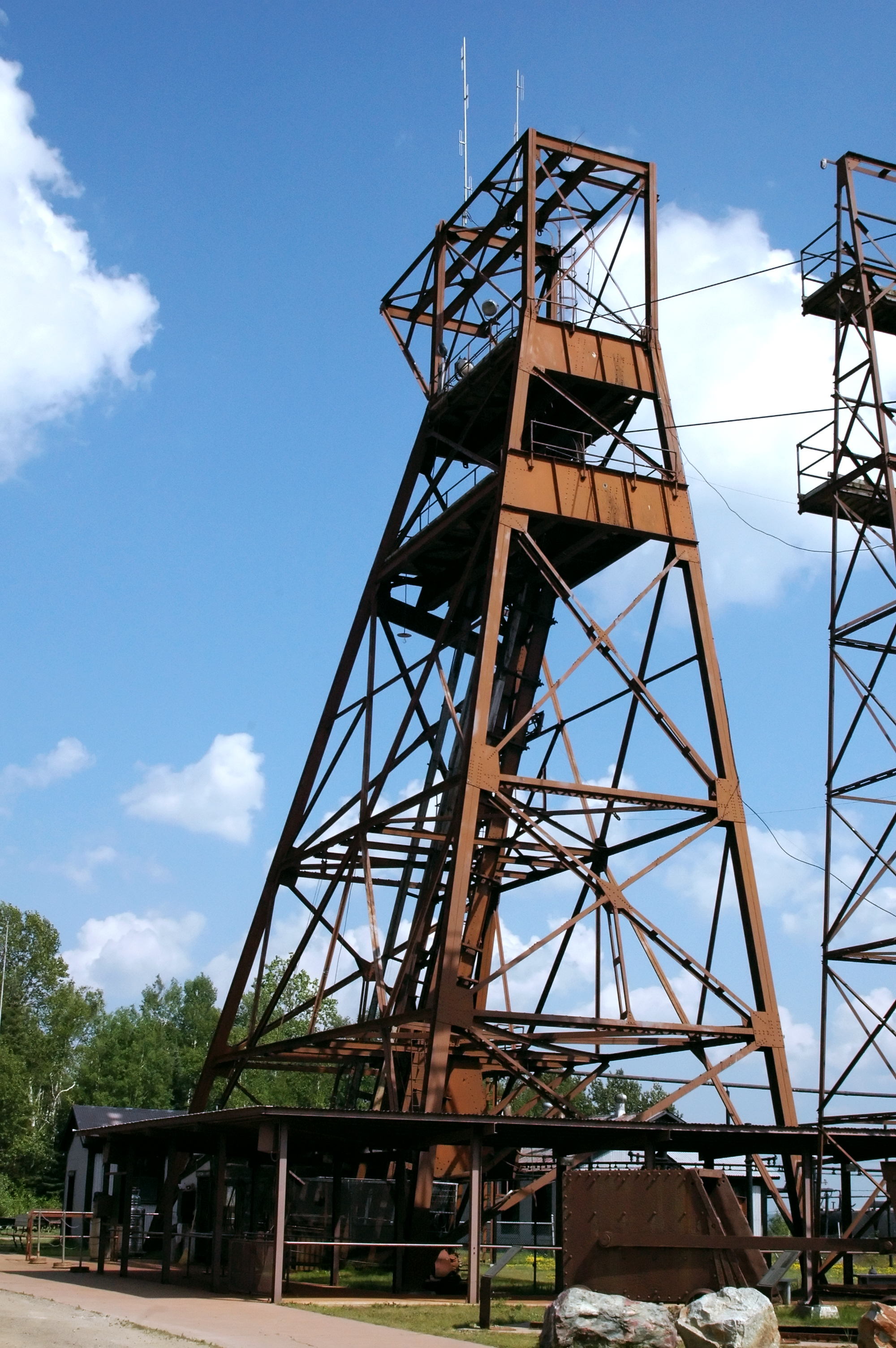
The headframe for shaft #8, still in active use today

In the late 19th century, prospectors searching for gold in northern Minnesota discovered extremely rich veins of hematite at this site, often containing more than 65% iron. An open pit mine began operation in 1882, and moved to underground mining by 1900 for safety reasons. From 1901 until the end of active mining in 1962, the Soudan Mine was owned by the United States Steel Corporation's Oliver Iron Mining division. By 1912 the mine was at a depth of 1,250 feet (381 m). When the mine closed, level 27 was being developed at 2,341 feet (713.5 m) below the surface and the entire underground workings consisted of more than fifty miles of drifts, adits, and raises. In 1965, US Steel donated the Soudan Mine to the State of Minnesota to use for educational purposes.

The primary underground mining method used was known as cut and fill. This involved mining the ceiling and using Ely Greenstone and other waste rock to artificially raise the floor at the same rate as the ceiling was being mined out. As a result, the floor and ceiling were always 10–20 feet (3–6 m) apart. There was no need to move waste rock to the surface, because it was moved short distances and left in place. This technique was particularly suited to the Soudan Mine due to the strength of the hematite formations and the weakness of the encasing Greenstone. This method was not possible in the nearby mines in Ely, Minnesota, because the iron formations there were fractured and thus were not as structurally stable as those at Soudan.

== State park ==
The park is in Breitung Township, on the shore of Lake Vermilion in northern Minnesota's Vermilion Range. It has become a popular tourist site, often visited on the way to and from Ely and the Boundary Waters Canoe Area Wilderness.

The state park is operated under the Department of Natural Resources. It is a National Historic Landmark, meaning that it is also listed on the National Register of Historic Places. As of 2021, the surface buildings are open to the public, and during the summer months there are daily tours of the mine. Visitors are lowered in the antique 1924 electric mine hoist to level 27, the mine's lowest level at 2,341 feet (713.5 m) below ground. As of 2021, tours of the previously active underground physics laboratory were no longer offered.

Lake Vermilion State Park, originally separate from Soudan Underground Mine State Park, began with the purchase of about 3,000 acres from U.S. Steel in 2010. The park includes the Stuntz Bay Boathouse Historic District. In 2014, the two adjacent parks were combined into one.

== Underground laboratory ==
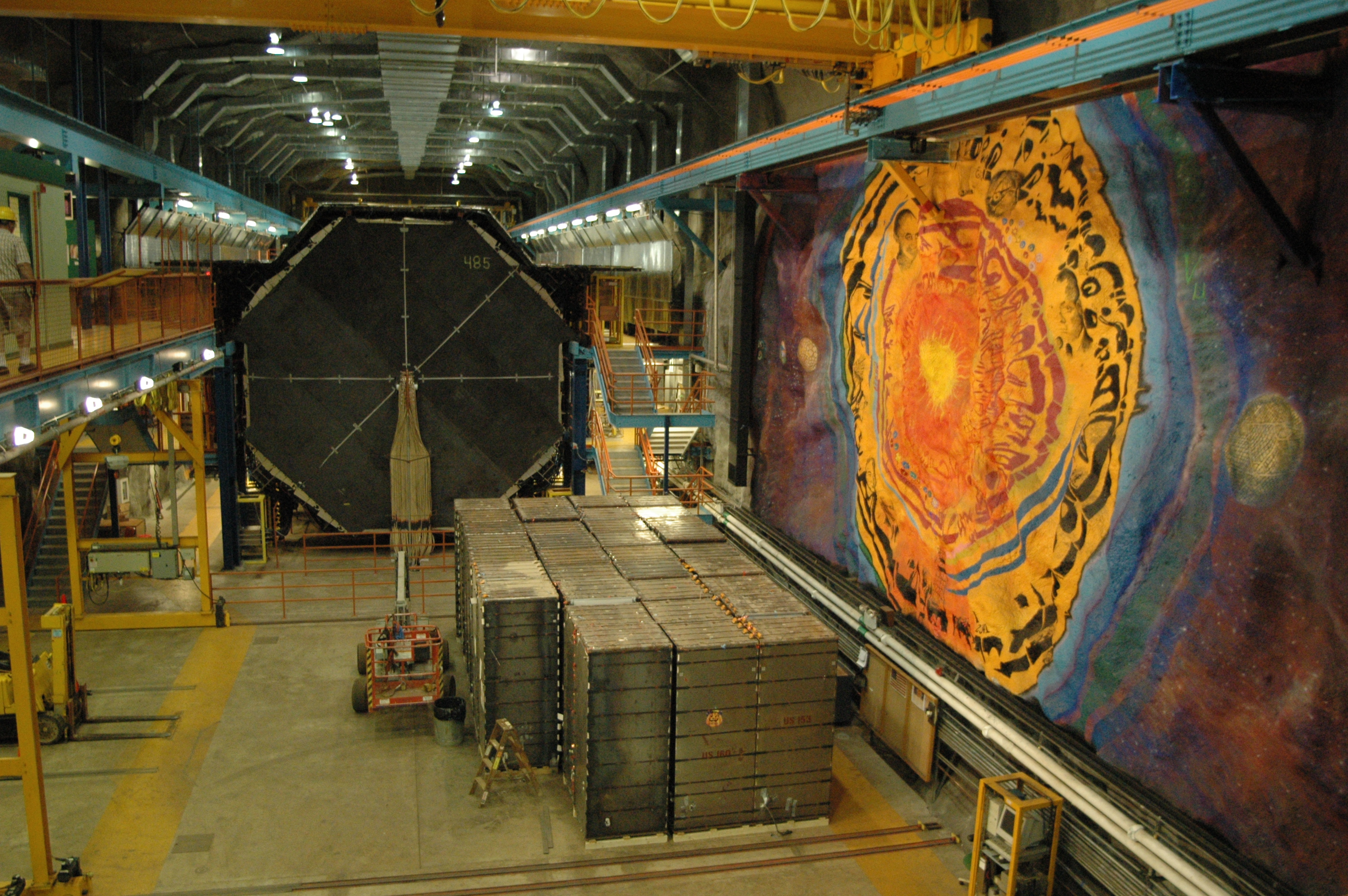
MINOS Detector

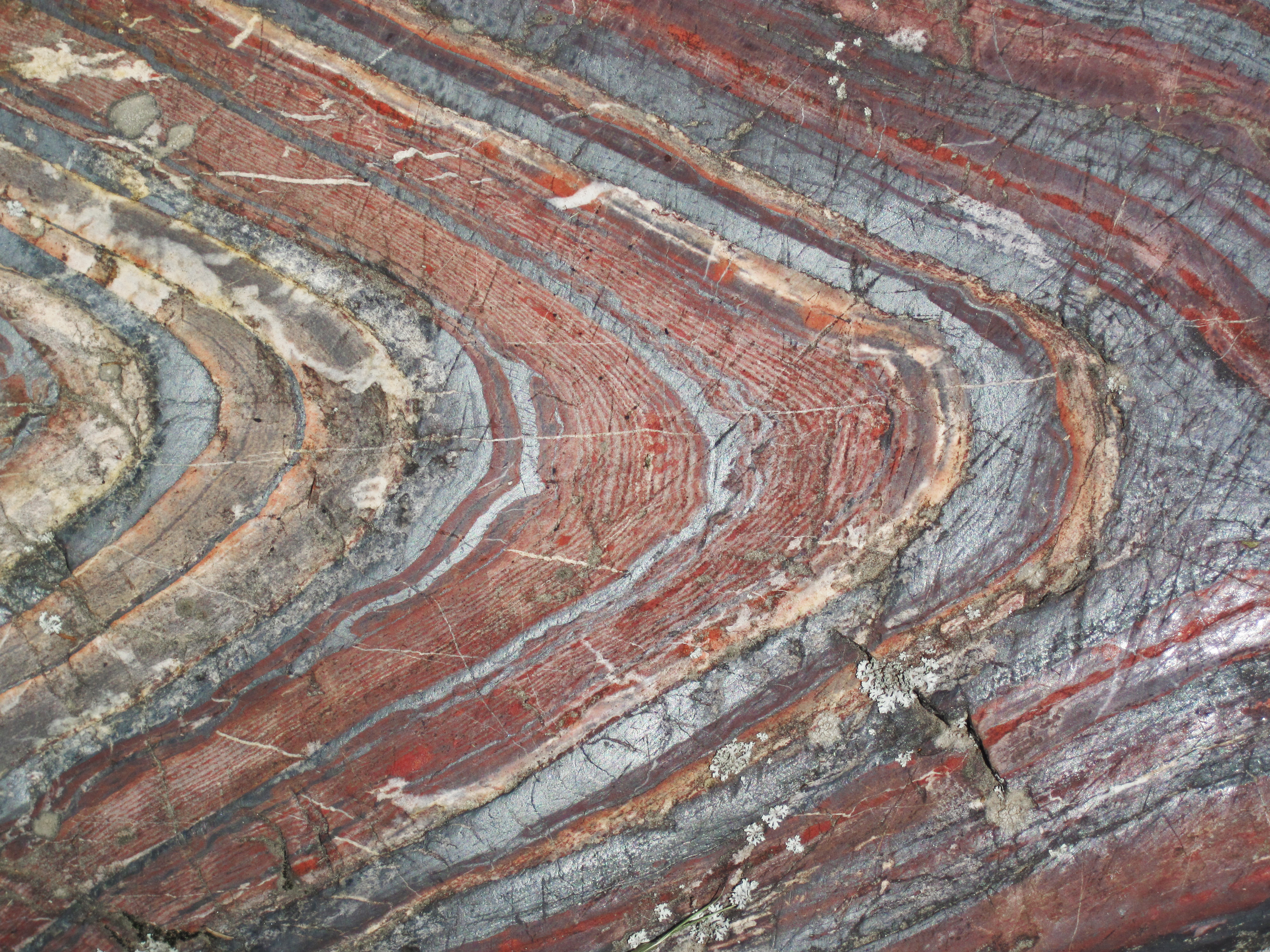
Surface outcrop, folded Soudan Iron-Formation, age about 2.69 billion years. Scratches are from glaciation.

In the 1980s, scientists from the University of Minnesota began to develop the Soudan Mine as a site for sensitive physics experiments because of the very low rate of cosmic rays in the deep underground site, and also because they could inexpensively use the still-operating mine hoist. The mine laboratory was originally home to the Soudan 1 proton decay experiment and its successor, Soudan 2 which operated from 1989-2001. The University and the Minnesota Department of Natural Resources later expanded the laboratory to accommodate other physics projects, such as the MINOS neutrino detector, dark matter search experiments CDMS-II, SuperCDMS, and CoGeNT, as well as work on electroforming copper to create pure radiation-free copper. Low-background materials screening facilities were in use and in continuing development. The mine was proposed as one possible site for a U.S. Deep Underground Science and Engineering Laboratory, but that project was instead awarded to the Homestake Mine (South Dakota). Parts of the laboratory had been open for daily tours, and there was an annual open house with more access to the facilities and representatives of the experiments to help with the tours and answer questions. The laboratory, along with public tours, were closed circa 2016.

== 2011 fire ==
A fire broke out late on March 17, 2011, in the main shaft at the 25th level. The fire was smothered using 70,000 gallons of fire-fighting foam, filling the 27th and lowest level of the shaft (27th level) from floor to ceiling. The Underground Laboratory lost power but remained safe. The mine tours were closed for the summer of 2011, but the above ground tours and interpretive center reopened. After a major cleanup effort, underground tours resumed on May 26, 2012.

== 2024 flooding ==
On June 18, 2024, rain flooded the mine and damaged the pump system, electrical system, several trains, and the Underground Laboratory air conditioner. Underground tours resumed in 2026.

== See also ==
- List of National Historic Landmarks in Minnesota
- National Register of Historic Places listings in St. Louis County, Minnesota
- List of Minnesota state parks
