= Tower, Minnesota =

City in Minnesota, United States

- City
- City of Tower
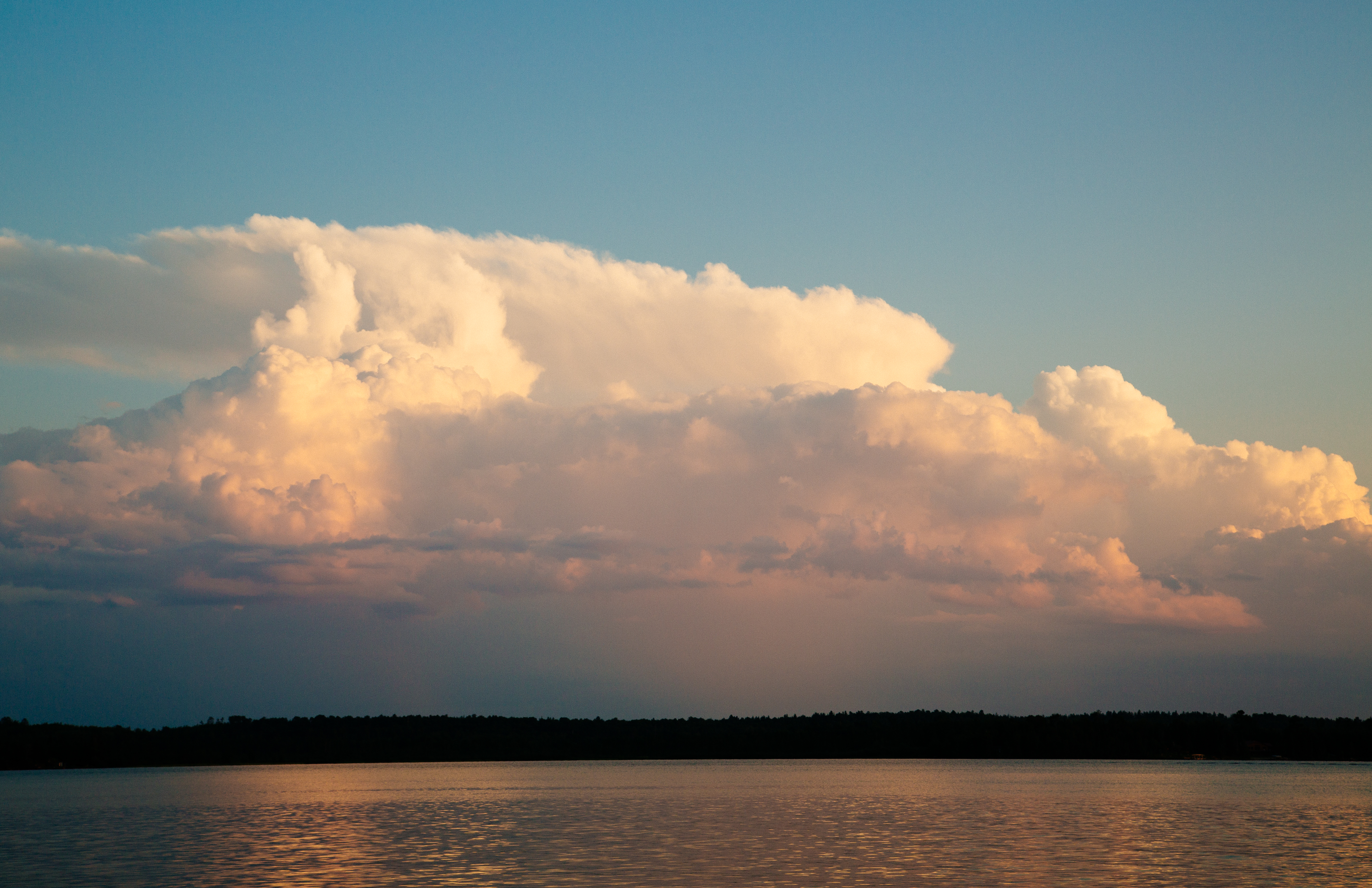
- A sunset over Lake Vermilion
- Motto: Lake Vermilions harbor city
- Location of the city of Tower within Saint Louis County, Minnesota
- Coordinates: 47°48′25″N 92°16′46″W
- Country: United States
- State: Minnesota
- County: Saint Louis
- Incorporated: March 13, 1889

Government
  - Mayor: Dave Setterberg

Area
  - Total: 2.92 sq mi (7.56 km^{2})
  - Land: 2.92 sq mi (7.56 km^{2})
  - Water: 0 sq mi (0.00 km^{2})
- Elevation: 1,398 ft (426 m)

Population (2020)
  - Total: 430
  - Density: 147.3/sq mi (56.88/km^{2})
- Time zone: UTC−6 (Central (CST))
  - Summer (DST): UTC−5 (CDT)
- ZIP code: 55790
- Area code: 218
- FIPS code: 27-65272
- GNIS feature ID: 0662661
- Website: Official website

Tower is a city located in Saint Louis County, Minnesota, United States. As of the 2020 census, the city had a total population of 430. State Highways 1 (MN 1), 169 (MN 169), and 135 (MN 135) are three of the main routes in Tower. Tower is located on the southern shore of Lake Vermilion.

== History ==
The city was incorporated March 13, 1889, which makes it the oldest city in the Arrowhead region. It owes its establishment to the Soudan Mine, and was named after mining financier Charlemagne Tower. Tower is home to the Tower Train Museum; near the museum is McKinley Monument, the first erected in honor of former U.S. president William McKinley shortly after his assassination in 1901. President McKinley was in office from 1897 to 1901.

Tower set the Minnesota record for coldest temperature on February 2, 1996, when the temperature dropped to -60 °F (-51 °C). This was the lowest temperature ever recorded in the United States east of the Great Plains. Tower and the Embarrass Valley to the south are the coldest inhabited locations in the Lower 48 states, based on average winter temperatures.

== Geography ==
According to the United States Census Bureau, the city has a total area of 3.41 square miles (8.83 km^{2}), 3.00 square miles (7.77 km^{2}) is land and 0.41 square miles (1.06 km^{2}) is water.

=== Climate ===
Tower has a humid continental climate (Köppen Dwb), with long, bitterly cold, dry winters and warm summers. January averages 4.9 °F or −15.1 °C, and lows reach 0 °F or −17.8 °C on 67 nights annually. Highs only reach the freezing point 18–19 days during December to February, and in combination with a seasonal snowfall of 68.7 inches or 1.74 metres, snow cover is thick and long−lasting. Spring, and more especially autumn, are short but mild transition seasons. July averages 64.0 °F or 17.8 °C, with highs reaching 90 °F or 32.2 °C on only 3.2 days annually, with only about four-fifths of all years seeing temperatures that high. Summer nights are cool despite the warm days, with the average window for freezing temperatures August 25 thru June 22. Precipitation averages about 28.18 inches or 715.8 millimetres per year, and is concentrated in the warmer months. The all−time record high temperature is 101 °F (38.3 °C), while the all−time record low is −60 °F (−51.1 °C), a range of 161 °F (89 °C), the second highest temperature variation in the state behind Federal Dam, Minnesota. Tower is slightly colder than International Falls, but a half of a degree warmer overall than Embarrass.

Climate data for Tower, Minnesota (1991–2020 normals, extremes 1895–present)
Month	Jan	Feb	Mar	Apr	May	Jun	Jul	Aug	Sep	Oct	Nov	Dec	Year
Record high °F (°C)	52 (11)	59 (15)	77 (25)	87 (31)	95 (35)	101 (38)	101 (38)	98 (37)	95 (35)	88 (31)	75 (24)	57 (14)	101 (38)
Mean maximum °F (°C)	38.2 (3.4)	44.9 (7.2)	58.3 (14.6)	71.7 (22.1)	83.9 (28.8)	86.8 (30.4)	89.4 (31.9)	88.0 (31.1)	83.7 (28.7)	74.4 (23.6)	55.1 (12.8)	40.6 (4.8)	91.4 (33.0)
Mean daily maximum °F (°C)	16.8 (−8.4)	23.1 (−4.9)	36.3 (2.4)	49.6 (9.8)	63.3 (17.4)	72.7 (22.6)	77.1 (25.1)	75.5 (24.2)	66.6 (19.2)	51.4 (10.8)	35.0 (1.7)	22.0 (−5.6)	49.1 (9.5)
Daily mean °F (°C)	4.9 (−15.1)	9.1 (−12.7)	22.7 (−5.2)	37.0 (2.8)	49.9 (9.9)	59.7 (15.4)	64.0 (17.8)	61.9 (16.6)	54.0 (12.2)	41.0 (5.0)	26.4 (−3.1)	12.5 (−10.8)	36.9 (2.7)
Mean daily minimum °F (°C)	−7.0 (−21.7)	−4.9 (−20.5)	9.2 (−12.7)	24.3 (−4.3)	36.4 (2.4)	46.7 (8.2)	51.0 (10.6)	48.3 (9.1)	41.5 (5.3)	30.6 (−0.8)	17.9 (−7.8)	3.1 (−16.1)	24.8 (−4.0)
Mean minimum °F (°C)	−36.0 (−37.8)	−32.4 (−35.8)	−21.3 (−29.6)	4.2 (−15.4)	20.1 (−6.6)	29.0 (−1.7)	36.3 (2.4)	33.3 (0.7)	23.9 (−4.5)	14.7 (−9.6)	−7.1 (−21.7)	−27.4 (−33.0)	−38.3 (−39.1)
Record low °F (°C)	−57 (−49)	−60 (−51)	−42 (−41)	−22 (−30)	10 (−12)	18 (−8)	24 (−4)	12 (−11)	11 (−12)	−7 (−22)	−39 (−39)	−52 (−47)	−60 (−51)
Average precipitation inches (mm)	0.76 (19)	0.75 (19)	0.91 (23)	1.85 (47)	3.01 (76)	3.96 (101)	4.31 (109)	3.46 (88)	3.92 (100)	2.75 (70)	1.55 (39)	0.95 (24)	28.18 (716)
Average snowfall inches (cm)	13.4 (34)	10.8 (27)	7.9 (20)	8.0 (20)	0.4 (1.0)	0.0 (0.0)	0.0 (0.0)	0.0 (0.0)	0.0 (0.0)	2.4 (6.1)	11.0 (28)	14.8 (38)	68.7 (174)
Average extreme snow depth inches (cm)	19.5 (50)	22.5 (57)	17.9 (45)	8.9 (23)	0.3 (0.76)	0.0 (0.0)	0.0 (0.0)	0.0 (0.0)	0.0 (0.0)	1.9 (4.8)	8.3 (21)	13.1 (33)	24.7 (63)
Average precipitation days (≥ 0.01 in)	7.3	6.5	6.3	7.9	12.4	13.1	12.6	10.2	11.8	10.4	8.9	8.1	115.5
Average snowy days (≥ 0.1 in)	7.6	6.7	4.4	3.1	0.2	0.0	0.0	0.0	0.0	1.3	6.2	8.1	37.6
Source: NOAA

== Entertainment and sports ==
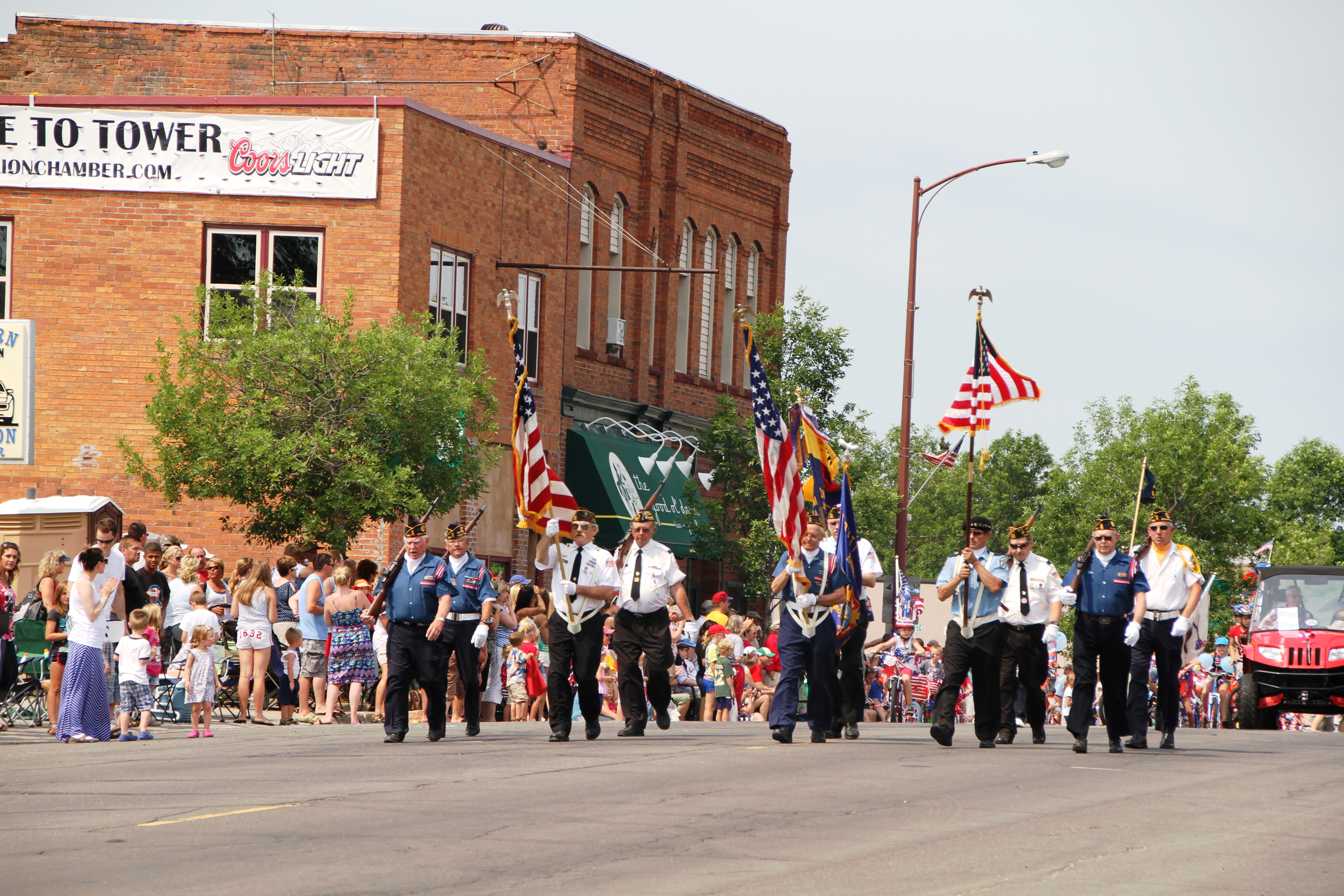
Fourth of July celebration in Tower

Fortune Bay Resort and Casino is located a few miles west of Tower. It is near Lake Vermilion, a well-known lake which attracts tourists and locals alike. The casino is owned and operated by the Bois Forte Band of Chippewa.

Tower has a simple sports ground with bleacher stands, close by the Tower School. At Lake Vermillion, a run tournament named after the lake is staged every year.

== Education ==
Tower is part of the St. Louis County school district based in Virginia, Minnesota. In town there is the Tower-Soudan Elementary School that serves students K–6. Students 7–12 are transported to other secondary schools nearby as Tower-Soudan does not have a secondary school at this point.

Outside of the district, Tower has a public charter school that serves students 7–12, called Vermilion Country School. Based in the old PowerRain building, this project-based secondary school was set up by parents and townspeople who advocated for a local secondary school. Opened in 2013, VCS graduated their first 6 seniors in May 2014.

== Demographics ==
Historical population
Census	Pop.	Note	%±
1890	1,110		—
1900	1,366		23.1%
1910	1,111		−18.7%
1920	706		−36.5%
1930	801		13.5%
1940	820		2.4%
1950	773		−5.7%
1960	878		13.6%
1970	699		−20.4%
1980	640		−8.4%
1990	502		−21.6%
2000	479		−4.6%
2010	500		4.4%
2020	430		−14.0%
U.S. Decennial Census

=== 2020 census ===
As of the 2020 census, there were 430 people living in an estimated 240 households in Tower.

=== 2010 census ===
As of the census of 2010, there were 500 people, 265 households, and 126 families residing in the city. The population density was 166.7 inhabitants per square mile (64.4/km^{2}). There were 331 housing units at an average density of 110.3 per square mile (42.6/km^{2}). The racial makeup of the city was 94.6% White, 2.4% Native American, 0.6% Asian, 0.2% from other races, and 2.2% from two or more races. Hispanic or Latino of any race were 1.2% of the population.

There were 265 households, of which 20.4% had children under the age of 18 living with them, 32.5% were married couples living together, 10.2% had a female householder with no husband present, 4.9% had a male householder with no wife present, and 52.5% were non-families. 45.7% of all households were made up of individuals, and 20% had someone living alone who was 65 years of age or older. The average household size was 1.89 and the average family size was 2.61.

The median age in the city was 48.4 years. 18.8% of residents were under the age of 18; 5.6% were between the ages of 18 and 24; 21.6% were from 25 to 44; 30% were from 45 to 64; and 24% were 65 years of age or older. The gender makeup of the city was 50.8% male and 49.2% female.

=== 2000 census ===
As of the 2000 census, there were 479 people in the city, organized into 233 households and 137 families. The population density was 176.8 inhabitants per square mile (68.3/km^{2}). There were 295 housing units at an average density of 108.9 per square mile (42.0/km^{2}). The racial makeup of the city was 97.70% White, 1.46% Native American, 0% Asian, 0% African American, 0% Pacific Islander, 0.84% from other races, and 0.00% from two or more races. 1.88% of the population were Hispanic or Latino of any race. 31.4% were of Finnish, 13.7% Norwegian, 11.1% Swedish, 8.6% German, 6.6% Slovene and 5.8% Italian ancestry.

There were 233 households, out of which 20.2% had children under the age of 18 living with them, 48.9% were married couples living together, 6.0% had a female householder with no husband present, and 41.2% were non-families. 37.8% of all households were made up of individuals, and 22.3% had someone living alone who was 65 years of age or older. The average household size was 2.06 and the average family size was 2.69.

In the city, the population was spread out, with 18.6% under the age of 18, 6.5% from 18 to 24, 24.0% from 25 to 44, 26.1% from 45 to 64, and 24.8% who were 65 years of age or older. The median age was 45 years. For every 100 females, there were 93.9 males. For every 100 females age 18 and over, there were 91.2 males.

The median income for a household in the city was $26,429, and the median income for a family was $37,500. Males had a median income of $35,000 versus $21,875 for females. The per capita income for the city was $17,169. 10.7% of the population and 3.7% of families were below the poverty line. Out of the total population, 12.5% of those under the age of 18 and 10.9% of those 65 and older were living below the poverty line.

== Media ==
Tower is served by an award-winning newspaper, the Timberjay. The Timberjay is published weekly, with a circulation of over 1000.
