= Embarrass =

Embarrass may refer to:

== Communities ==
- Embarrass Township, Edgar County, Illinois, United States
- Embarrass Township, St. Louis County, Minnesota, United States
- Embarrass, Minnesota, within the township
- Embarrass, Wisconsin, United States

== Other ==
- Embarrass River (disambiguation)

== See also ==
- Embarras (disambiguation)
- Embarrassment (disambiguation)
