= Waasa Township, St. Louis County, Minnesota =

Waasa Township, Minnesota
- Township
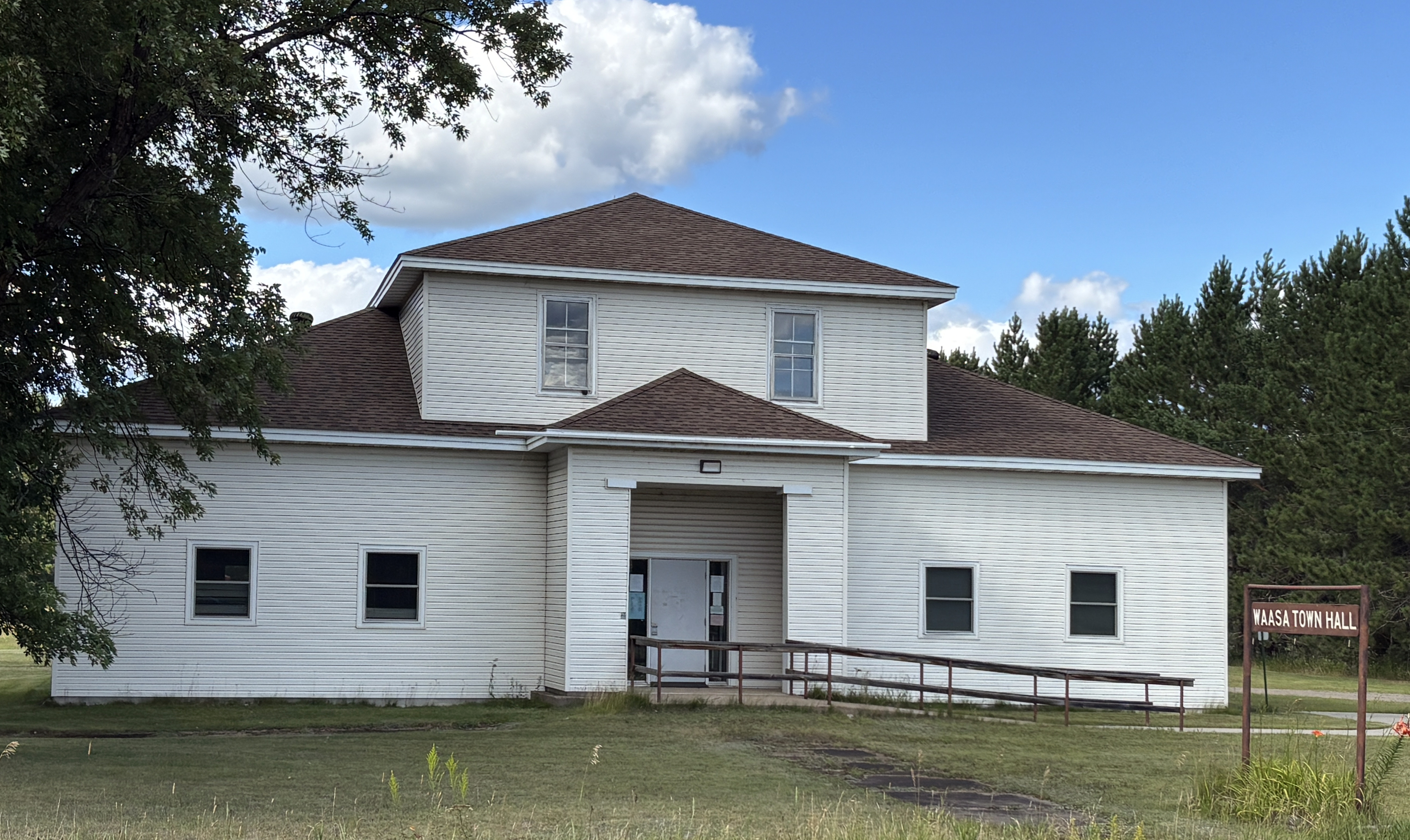
- Wassa Town Hall

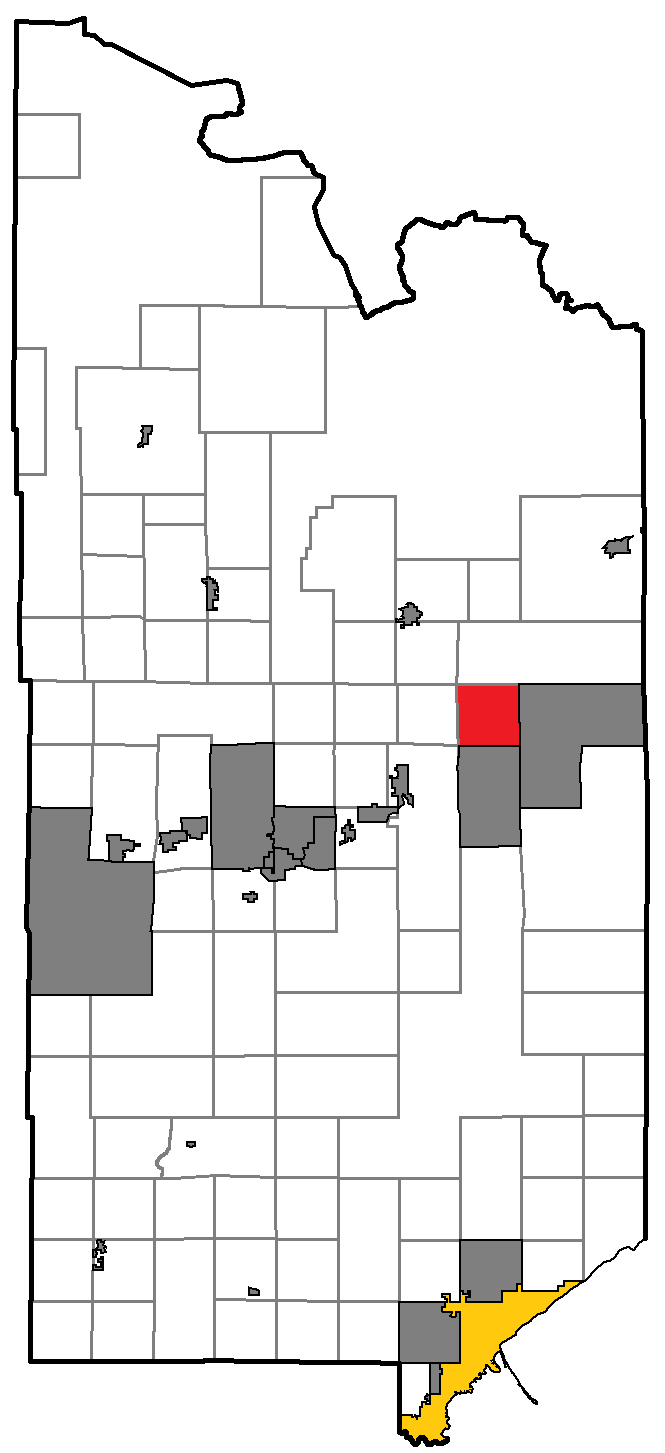
- Location of Waasa Township within St. Louis County, Minnesota
- Coordinates: 47°39′58″N 92°6′56″W
- Country: United States
- State: Minnesota
- County: Saint Louis

Area
  - Total: 35.4 sq mi (91.6 km^{2})
  - Land: 35.1 sq mi (90.9 km^{2})
  - Water: 0.23 sq mi (0.6 km^{2})
- Elevation: 1,457 ft (444 m)

Population (2020)
  - Total: 225
  - Density: 6.41/sq mi (2.48/km^{2})
- Time zone: UTC-6 (Central (CST))
  - Summer (DST): UTC-5 (CDT)
- FIPS code: 27-67342
- GNIS feature ID: 0665881

Waasa Township is a township in Saint Louis County, Minnesota, United States. The population was 225 at the 2020 census.

Saint Louis County Highway 21 (CR 21) serves as a main route in the township. CR 21 runs east–west through the township.

Other routes include Salo Road.

== History ==
Waasa Township derives its name from Vaasa Province, in Finland.

== Geography ==
According to the United States Census Bureau, the township has a total area of 35.3 square miles (91 km^{2}); 35.1 square miles (91 km^{2}) is land and 0.2 square miles (0.52 km^{2}), or 0.68%, is water.

The Embarrass River runs east–west through the middle of Waasa Township. Camp Eight Creek flows through the north–central part of the township. Spring Mine Creek flows through the southeast part of the township.

=== Adjacent townships, cities, and communities ===
The following are adjacent to Waasa Township :

- The city of Babbitt (east)
- The city of Hoyt Lakes (south)
- White Township (southwest)
- Embarrass Township (west)
- The unincorporated community of Embarrass (west)
- Kugler Township (northwest)
- Bear Island State Forest (north and northeast)
- Bear Island Lake (northeast)

== Demographics ==
At the 2000 census there were 304 people, 121 households, and 89 families living in the township. The population density was 8.7 people per square mile (3.3/km^{2}). There were 148 housing units at an average density of 4.2/sq mi (1.6/km^{2}). The racial makeup of the township was 96.71% White and 3.29% Native American. 30.8% were of Finnish, 20.7% German, 16.0% Norwegian, 6.3% English and 5.5% Irish ancestry according to Census 2000. Of the 121 households 27.3% had children under the age of 18 living with them, 63.6% were married couples living together, 5.0% had a female householder with no husband present, and 26.4% were non-families. 23.1% of households were one person and 8.3% were one person aged 65 or older. The average household size was 2.51 and the average family size was 2.88.

The age distribution was 23.4% under the age of 18, 7.9% from 18 to 24, 25.7% from 25 to 44, 27.0% from 45 to 64, and 16.1% 65 or older. The median age was 42 years. For every 100 females, there were 121.9 males. For every 100 females age 18 and over, there were 121.9 males.

The median household income was $37,778 and the median family income was $43,393. Males had a median income of $39,792 versus $21,750 for females. The per capita income for the township was $15,282. About 7.7% of families and 16.3% of the population were below the poverty line, including 31.7% of those under the age of eighteen and 5.0% of those sixty five or over.

== See also ==
- Vaasa, Finland
