= Embarrass Township =

Embarrass Township may refer to the following townships in the United States:

- Embarrass Township, Edgar County, Illinois
- Embarrass Township, St. Louis County, Minnesota
