= Erick and Kristina Nelimark Sauna =

- U.S. National Register of Historic Places
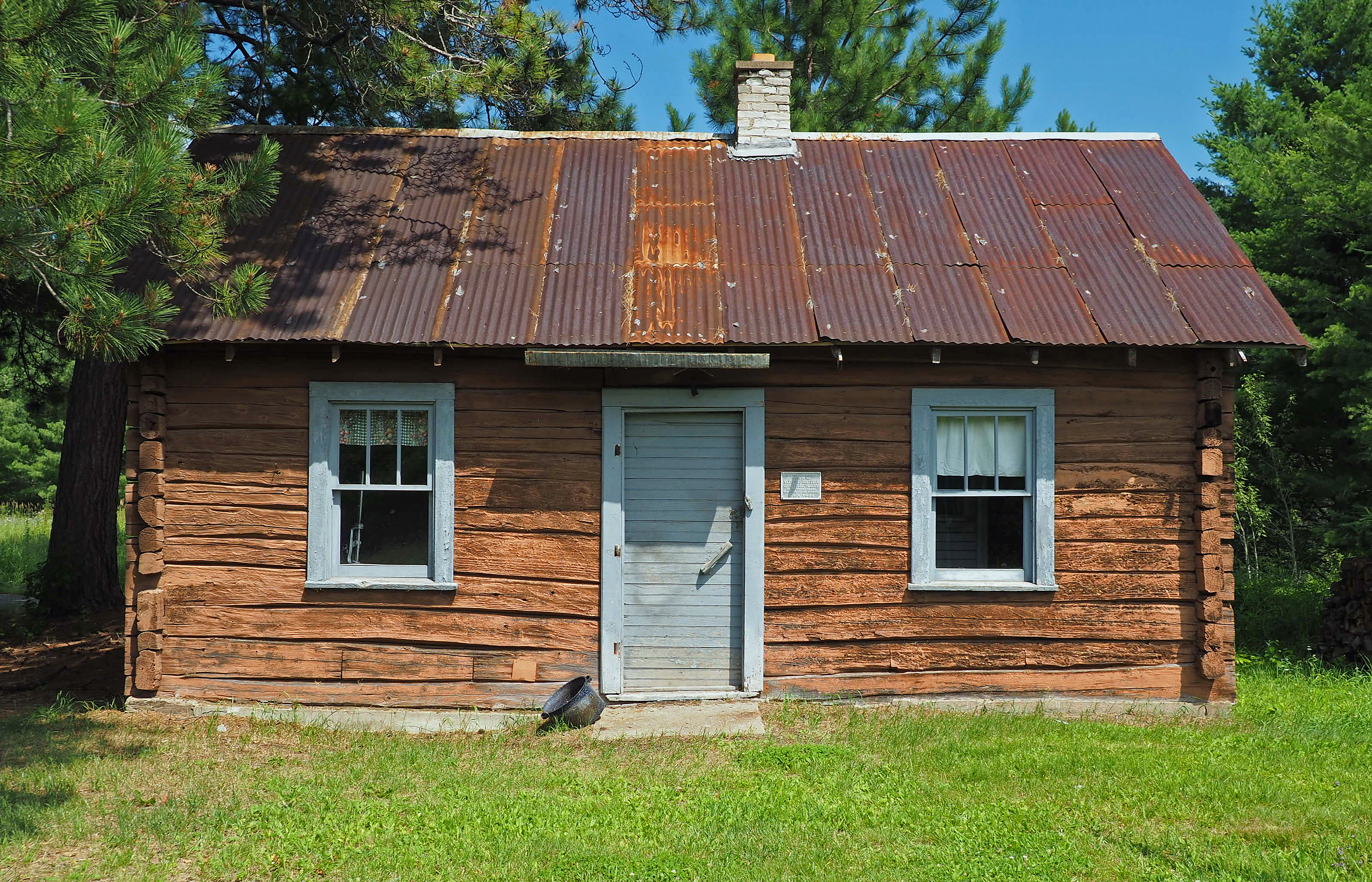
- The Nelimark Sauna viewed from the south

- Location within Minnesota Location within the United States
- Location: 4839 Salo Road, Embarrass, Minnesota
- Coordinates: 47°39′46″N 92°11′45″W
- Area: Less than one acre
- Built: Circa 1930
- Architect: Erick Nelimark
- Architectural style: Log
- MPS: Rural Finnish Log Buildings of St. Louis County, Minnesota, 1890–1930s MPS
- NRHP reference No.: 90000770
- Added to NRHP: April 9, 1990

The Erick and Kristina Nelimark Sauna is a historic Finnish sauna in Embarrass, Minnesota, United States. It was built around 1930. The sauna was listed on the National Register of Historic Places in 1990 for its state-level significance in the themes of agriculture, architecture, and European ethnic heritage. It was nominated for reflecting the area's settlement by Finnish American farmers and their use of traditional log construction.

The sauna is preserved on the grounds of the Nelimark Homestead Museum.

== See also ==
- National Register of Historic Places listings in St. Louis County, Minnesota
