= Height of land (disambiguation) =

Height of land, in the field of topography, is a synonym for a drainage divide.

Height of land or Height of Land may also refer to:

- Height of Land Portage (Boundary Waters), a portage along the Boundary Waters between Ontario and Minnesota
- Height of Land Portage (St. Louis County), a portage between the Pike River and the Embarrass River in Minnesota
- Height of Land Township, Becker County, Minnesota, a township in Minnesota
