= Height of Land Portage (St. Louis County) =

River portage crossing the Laurentian Divide in northern Minnesota

- U.S. National Register of Historic Places
- U.S. Historic district
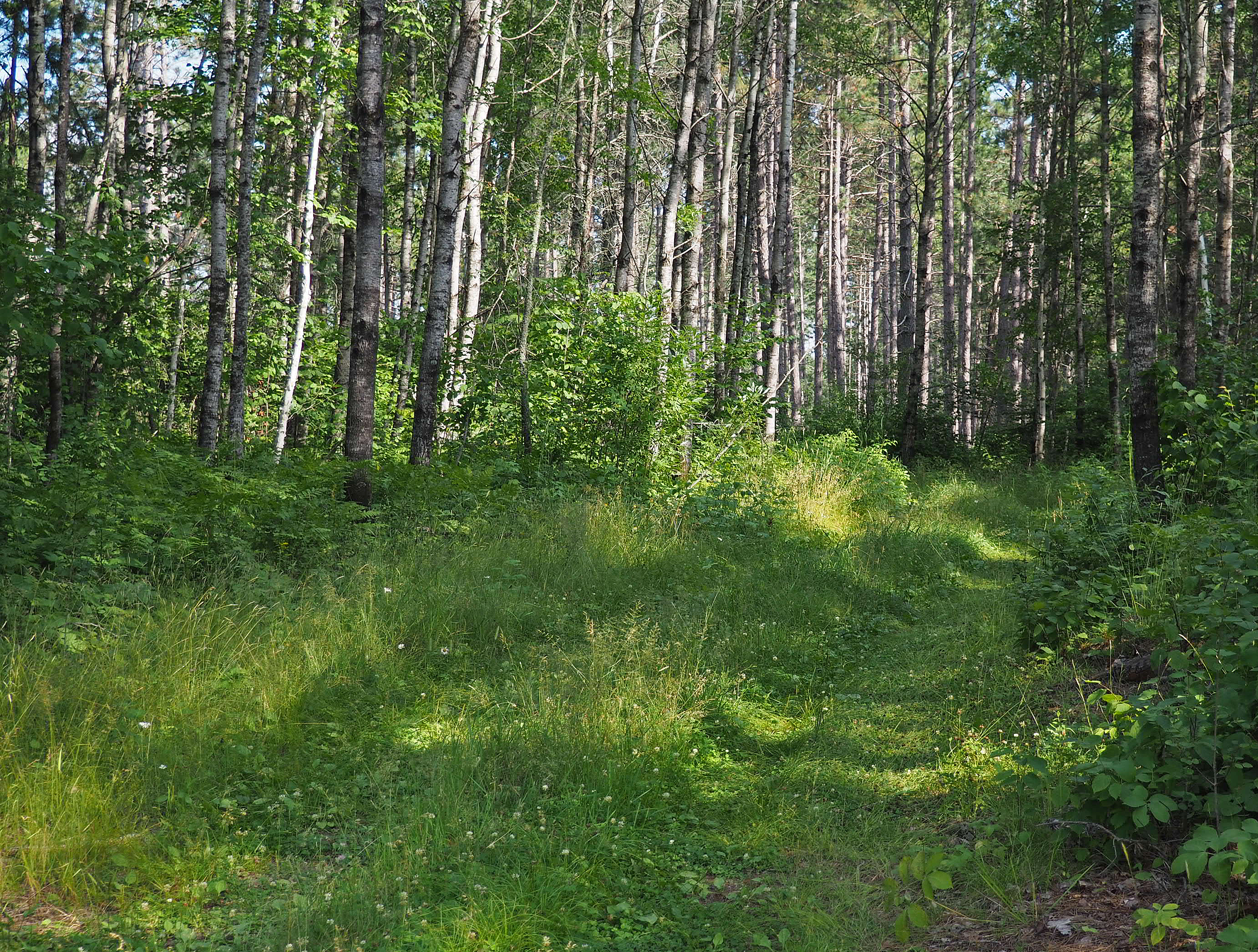
- A modern snowmobile trail along the portage route

- Location within Minnesota Location within the United States
- Location: Off County Road 138 in Embarrass, White, and Pike Townships, Minnesota
- Coordinates: 47°36′49″N 92°18′6″W
- Area: 163.2 acres (66.0 ha)
- Built: c. 1630s–1870s
- MPS: Portage Trails in Minnesota MPS
- NRHP reference No.: 92000842
- Added to NRHP: July 23, 1992

Height of Land Portage is a historic portage route between the Embarrass River and the Pike River in St. Louis County, Minnesota, United States. The 4.6-mile (7.4 km) route crosses the Laurentian Divide, providing access between the Hudson Bay drainage basin and the Great Lakes Basin. The portage was a key connection for canoe-based travelers from the 1630s to the 1870s. It was listed on the National Register of Historic Places in 1992 for its state-level significance in the themes of archaeology, exploration/settlement, and transportation. It was nominated for its potential archaeological resources and associations with the fur trade and European expansion in North America.

== See also ==
- National Register of Historic Places listings in St. Louis County, Minnesota
