= Elias and Lisi Aho Farmstead =

Historic farmstead in northern Minnesota, United States

- Elias and Lisi Aho Historic Farmstead
- U.S. National Register of Historic Places
- U.S. Historic district
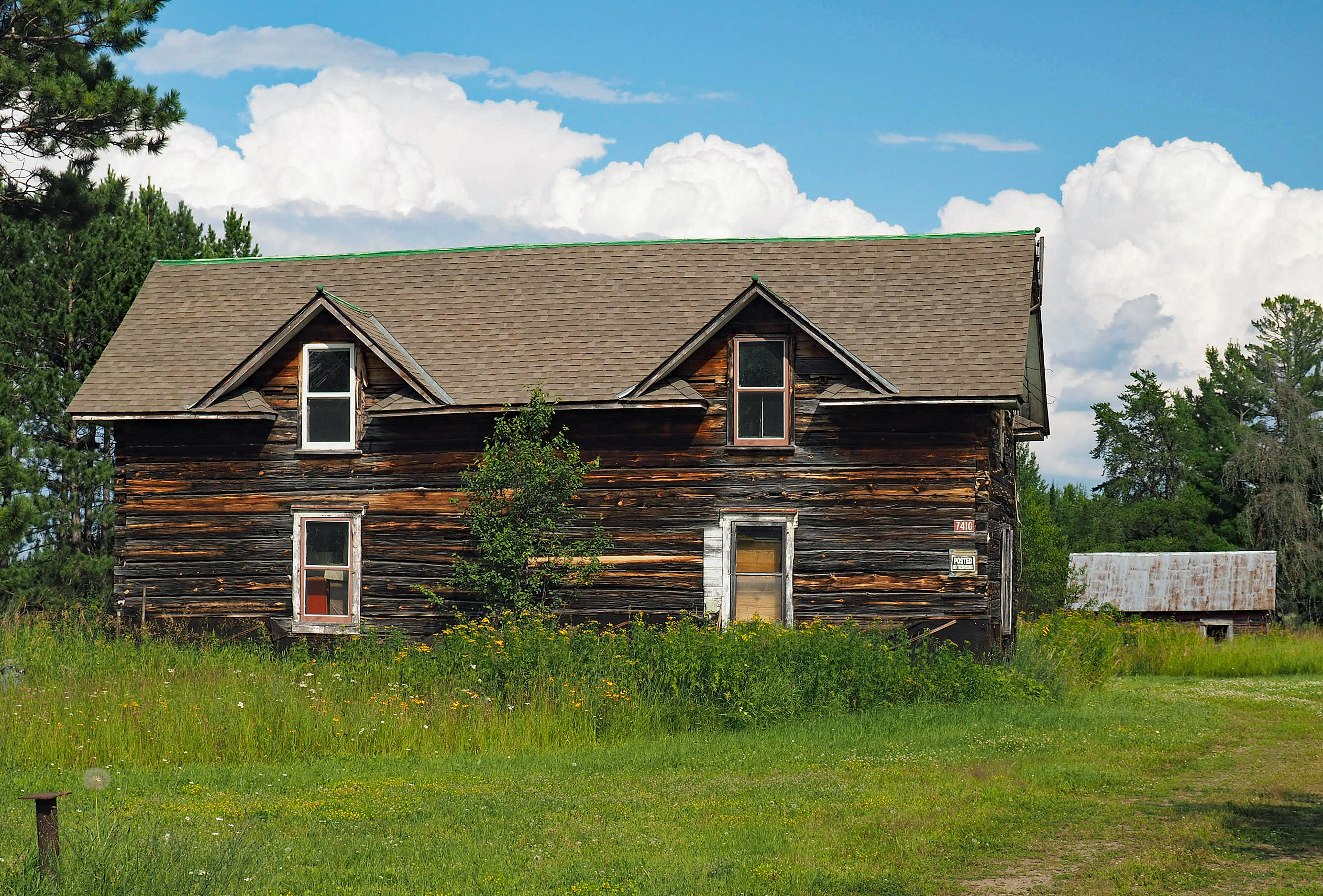
- The Aho Farmstead's farmhouse (foreground) and cattle barn (background right) viewed from the west

- Location within Minnesota Location within the United States
- Location: 7410 Skarp Road, Waasa Township, Minnesota
- Coordinates: 47°39′6″N 92°9′35″W
- Area: 160 acres (65 ha)
- Built: 1902–1907
- Architect: Elias Aho
- Architectural style: Log
- MPS: Rural Finnish Log Buildings of St. Louis County, Minnesota, 1890–1930s MPS
- NRHP reference No.: 90000499
- Added to NRHP: April 9, 1990

The Elias and Lisi Aho Farmstead (/ˈeɪhoʊ/) is a historic farmstead in Waasa Township, Minnesota, United States. It was established by a Finnish immigrant family and includes five surviving buildings constructed with traditional Finnish log architecture from 1902 to 1907. The farm was listed as a historic district on the National Register of Historic Places in 1990 for its state-level significance in the themes of agriculture, architecture, and European ethnic heritage. The Aho Farmstead was nominated for reflecting the successful cultivation of northeastern Minnesota's cutover forests by Finnish American settlers and their use of traditional log architecture.

== Description ==
The historic district consists of six contributing properties, all dating to between 1902 and 1907. Five are log buildings: the house, the main barn, a smaller cattle barn, a riihi (grain-drying barn) later used as a stable, and a smoke sauna. The sixth contributing property comprises the fields east of the farmstead, which were first cleared by the Aho family during the same timeframe.

== See also ==
- National Register of Historic Places listings in St. Louis County, Minnesota
