= Isabel, Illinois =

Isabel
- Unincorporated community
- Edgar County's location in Illinois

- Isabel's location in Edgar County
- Coordinates: 39°39′19″N 87°57′00″W
- Country: United States
- State: Illinois
- County: Edgar County
- Township: Embarrass Township
- Elevation: 669 ft (204 m)
- ZIP code: 61943
- Area code: 217
- GNIS feature ID: 0410945

Isabel is an unincorporated community in Embarrass Township, Edgar County, Illinois, United States.

== Notable person ==
Isabel was the birthplace of Lester C. Hunt, 19th Governor of Wyoming.

== Geography ==
Isabel is located at 39°39′19″N 087°57′00″W at an elevation of 669 feet. It is less than a mile west of the small town of Borton.
