= Brocton, Illinois =

Brocton
- Village (United States)
- Location of Brocton in Edgar County, Illinois.

- Brocton's location in Edgar County
- Coordinates: 39°42′55″N 87°56′01″W
- Country: United States
- State: Illinois
- County: Edgar
- Township: Embarrass

Area
  - Total: 0.57 sq mi (1.48 km^{2})
  - Land: 0.57 sq mi (1.48 km^{2})
  - Water: 0 sq mi (0.00 km^{2})
- Elevation: 663 ft (202 m)

Population (2020)
  - Total: 273
  - Density: 477.5/sq mi (184.36/km^{2})
- Time zone: UTC-6 (CST)
  - Summer (DST): UTC-5 (CDT)
- ZIP code: 61917
- Area code: 217
- FIPS code: 17–08524
- GNIS feature ID: 2397464

Brocton is a village in Embarrass Township, Edgar County, Illinois, United States. The population was 273 at the 2020 census.

== Geography ==
According to the 2010 census, Brocton has a total area of 0.58 square miles (1.50 km^{2}), all land.

== Demographics ==
Historical population
| Census | Pop. | Note | %± |
|---|---|---|---|
| 1890 | 292 | | — |
| 1900 | 613 | | 109.9% |
| 1910 | 558 | | −9.0% |
| 1920 | 562 | | 0.7% |
| 1930 | 429 | | −23.7% |
| 1940 | 449 | | 4.7% |
| 1950 | 406 | | −9.6% |
| 1960 | 380 | | −6.4% |
| 1970 | 349 | | −8.2% |
| 1980 | 393 | | 12.6% |
| 1990 | 322 | | −18.1% |
| 2000 | 322 | | 0.0% |
| 2010 | 322 | | 0.0% |
| 2020 | 273 | | −15.2% |
U.S. Decennial Census

As of the 2020 census there were 273 people, 146 households, and 99 families residing in the village. The population density was 477.27 inhabitants per square mile (184.27/km^{2}). There were 129 housing units at an average density of 225.52 units per square mile (87.07 units/km^{2}). The racial makeup of the village was 96.34% White and 3.66% from two or more races. Hispanic or Latino of any race were 1.10% of the population.

There were 146 households, out of which 21.9% had children under the age of 18 living with them, 62.33% were married couples living together, 4.11% had a female householder with no husband present, and 32.19% were non-families. 20.55% of all households were made up of individuals, and 10.96% had someone living alone who was 65 years of age or older. The average household size was 2.56 and the average family size was 2.29.

The village's age distribution consisted of 17.0% under the age of 18, 7.5% from 18 to 24, 13.5% from 25 to 44, 43.6% from 45 to 64, and 18.5% who were 65 years of age or older. The median age was 48.6 years. For every 100 females, there were 97.1 males. For every 100 females age 18 and over, there were 86.6 males.

The median income for a household in the village was $51,591, and the median income for a family was $63,958. Males had a median income of $32,188 versus $28,750 for females. The per capita income for the village was $23,881. About 11.1% of families and 16.5% of the population were below the poverty line, including 33.9% of those under age 18 and 9.7% of those age 65 or over.

== Education ==
Brocton had its own high school until 1952. The Brocton High School mascot was the "Purple Martins". In 1952, schools in Brocton and Redmon consolidated. Brocton-Redmon High School (mascot: "Blackhawks") continued in its place until 1968, when it merged with Young America High School in Metcalf to form Shiloh School.
