= Embarrass River =

Embarrass River may refer to:

- Embarrass River (Minnesota)
- Embarrass River (Wisconsin)

== See also ==
- Embarras River (disambiguation)
