= Gregorius and Mary Hanka Farmstead =

- Gregorius and Mary Hanka Historic Farmstead
- U.S. National Register of Historic Places
- U.S. Historic district
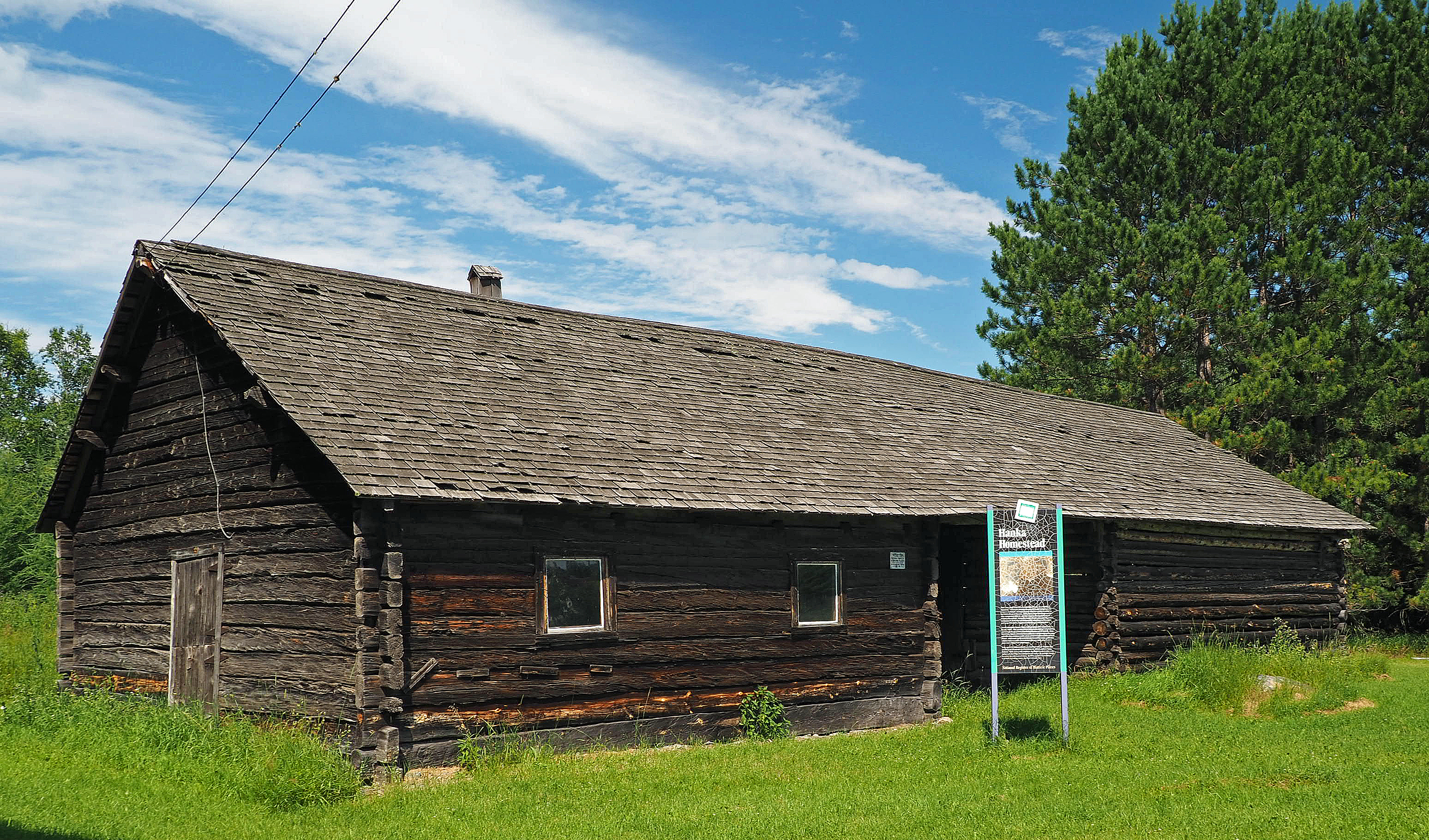
- The Hanka Farmstead's cattle and hay barn

- Location within Minnesota Location within the United States
- Location: 7938 Pylka Road, Embarrass Township, Minnesota
- Coordinates: 47°41′24″N 92°12′10″W
- Area: 69 acres (28 ha)
- Built: c. 1910–1915
- Architect: Gregorius Hanka
- Architectural style: Log
- MPS: Rural Finnish Log Buildings of St. Louis County, Minnesota, 1890–1930s MPS
- NRHP reference No.: 90000500
- Added to NRHP: April 9, 1990

The Gregorius and Mary Hanka Farmstead is a historic farmstead in Embarrass Township, Minnesota, United States. It was established by a Finnish immigrant family around 1910 and includes four surviving buildings constructed with traditional Finnish log architecture. The farm was listed as a historic district on the National Register of Historic Places in 1990 for its state-level significance in the themes of agriculture, architecture, and European ethnic heritage. It was nominated for reflecting the successful conversion of St. Louis County's cutover forests into productive agricultural land by Finnish immigrants, and their use of traditional log architecture.

== Description ==
The historic district consists of six contributing properties. The house, sauna, cattle and hay barn, and an outlying field hay barn were all built roughly between 1910 and 1915 and exhibit traditional Finnish log construction. Rounding out the inventory of historic properties are the farm's well and agricultural fields. The property contains several other buildings that were constructed or moved to the site in the mid-20th century and are considered non-contributing to the historic district.

== See also ==
- National Register of Historic Places listings in St. Louis County, Minnesota
