= Embarras =

Embarras is a term used by French explorers in North America for river obstacles such as blockages, logjams, etc.

Embarras may also refer to:

- Embarras, Alberta, a locality in Yellowhead County
- Embarras River (Alberta), a tributary of the McLeod River
- Embarras River (Illinois), a tributary of the Wabash River

== See also ==
- Embarrass (disambiguation)
