= Embarras River =

Embarras River may refer to:

- Embarras River (Alberta), a river in Canada
- Embarras River (Illinois), a river in the United States

== See also ==
- Embarrass River (disambiguation)
