= Robert F. Casey =

American lawyer and politician

Robert F. Casey (September 25, 1921 – October 7, 2006) was an American lawyer and politician.

Born in Borton, Illinois, Casey moved with his family to Chicago, Illinois and graduated from Hirsch High School. During World War II, Casey served in the United States Navy and was an aircraft carrier pilot, earning the rank of Lieutenant (junior grade). Casey then received his bachelor's degree from the College of Commerce and Business Administration at the University of Illinois Urbana-Champaign in 1947 and his law degree from University of Illinois College of Law in 1948. He also taught at the College of Commerce and Business Administration while attending the College of Law. He practiced law in Aurora, Illinois and St. Charles, Illinois. From 1959 to 1962 and in 1979 to 1980, Casey served in the Illinois House of Representatives and was a Republican. Casey also served as chairman of the Illinois Motor Vehicle Review Board and as administrator of the Illinois Gaming Board. Casey died at his home in Batavia, Illinois.
