= Embarrass Township, St. Louis County, Minnesota =

Embarrass Township, Minnesota
- Township
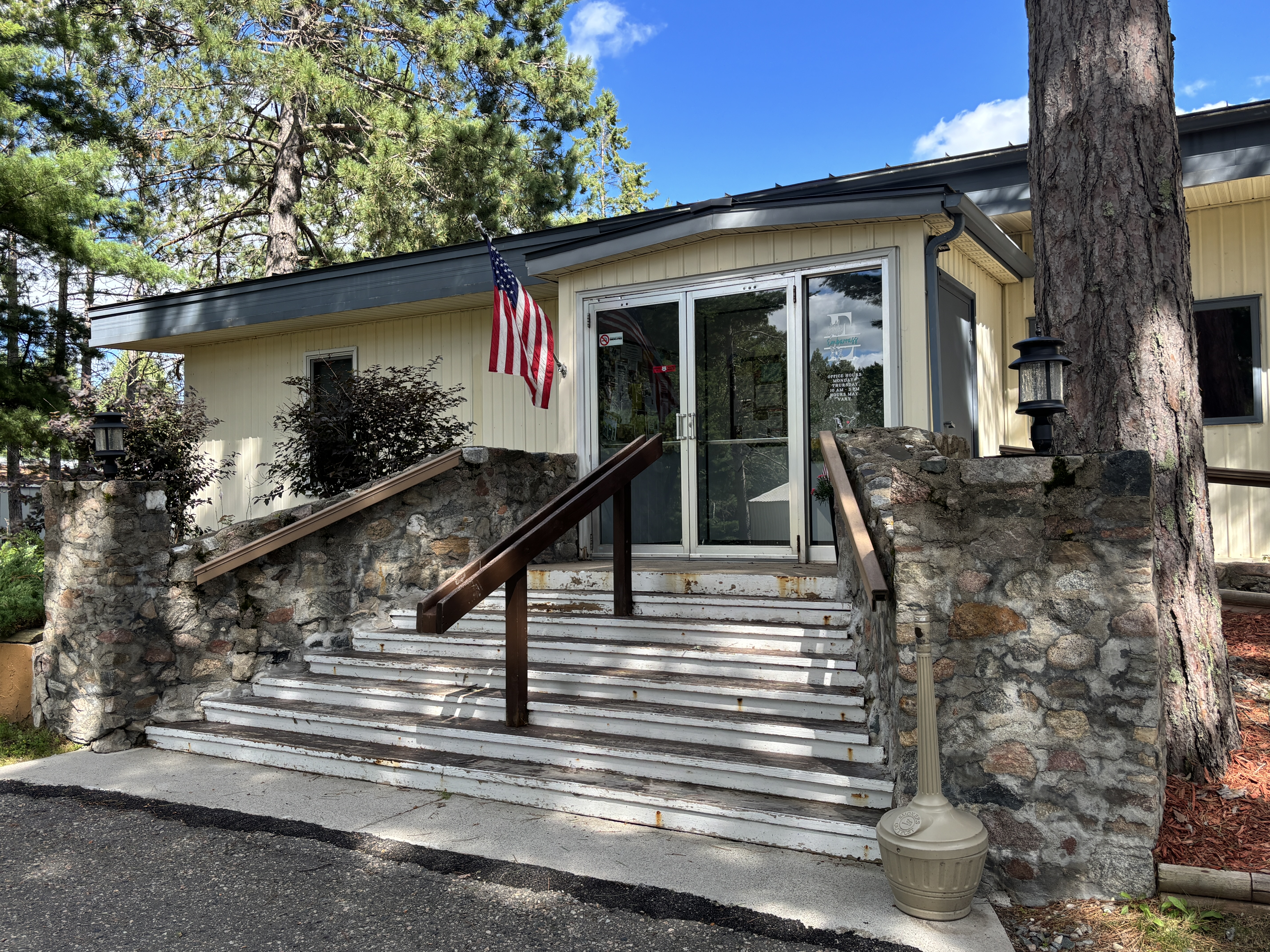
- Town Hall
- Motto: "The Cold Spot"
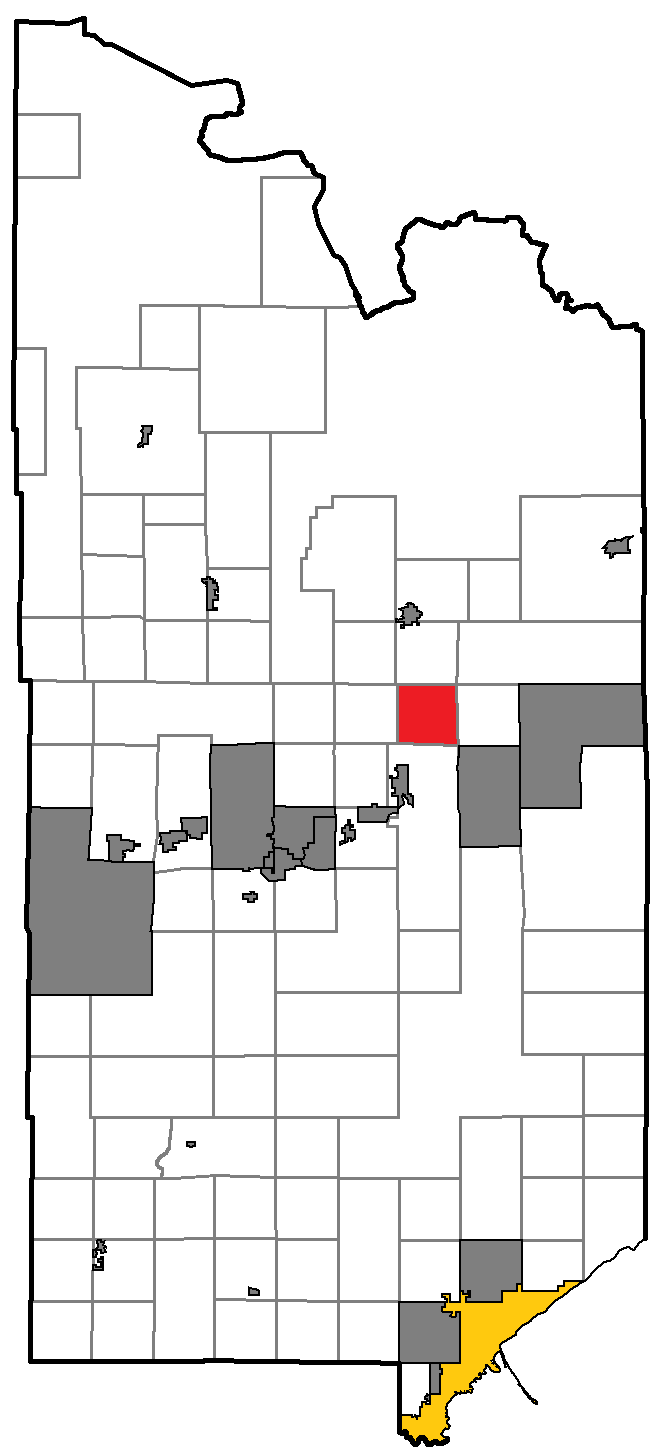
- Location of Embarrass Township within St. Louis County, Minnesota
- Coordinates: 47°39′8″N 92°14′11″W
- Country: United States
- State: Minnesota
- County: Saint Louis

Area
  - Total: 32.8 sq mi (84.9 km^{2})
  - Land: 32.7 sq mi (84.7 km^{2})
  - Water: 0.077 sq mi (0.2 km^{2})
- Elevation: 1,493 ft (455 m)

Population (2020)
  - Total: 601
  - Density: 18.4/sq mi (7.10/km^{2})
- Time zone: UTC-6 (Central (CST))
  - Summer (DST): UTC-5 (CDT)
- FIPS code: 27-19232
- GNIS feature ID: 0664094

Embarrass Township is a township in Saint Louis County, Minnesota, United States. The population was 601 at the 2020 census.

State Highway 135 (MN 135), Saint Louis County Highway 21 (CR 21), and County Road 26 (CR 26) are three of the main routes in the township.

The unincorporated community of Embarrass is located within Embarrass Township.

The township is located on the Mesabi Iron Range.

== Notes ==
With an average annual temperature of 34.5 °F (1.4 °C), Embarrass is notable as the coldest place in Minnesota. In January 2005, Embarrass had a near-record low temperature of −54 °F (−48 °C). The unofficial record low temperature is −64 °F (−53 °C), which was reached in February 1996. The thermometer that measured this temperature was verified for accuracy by Taylor Environmental Instruments, but as it was not recorded at a National Weather Service Cooperative Site, it will remain unofficial. The current record low temperature for Minnesota −60 °F (−51 °C) was recorded outside of the nearby town of Tower on February 2, 1996, by the NWS Cooperative Observer located there.

== Geography ==
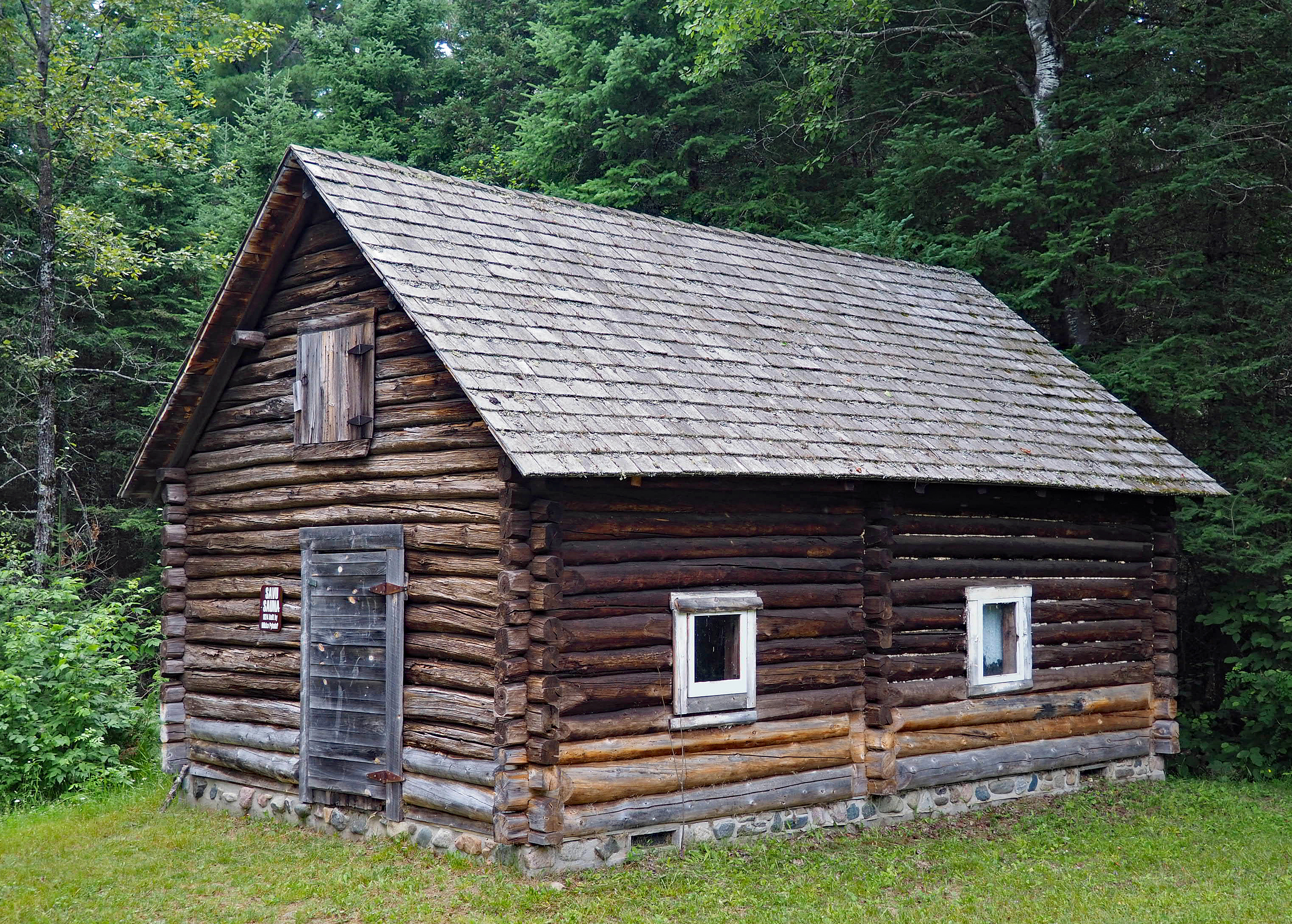
The sauna cabin of Pyhala Farm in Embarrass

According to the United States Census Bureau, the township has a total area of 32.8 square miles (85 km^{2}); 32.7 square miles (85 km^{2}) is land and 0.1 square miles (0.3 km^{2}), or 0.24%, is water.

Embarrass is located 22 miles northeast of the city of Virginia; and 27 miles southwest of Ely. Embarrass is 12 miles south of Tower; and 86 miles north of Duluth. Nearby places include Tower, Aurora, Hoyt Lakes, Biwabik, and Babbitt.

The Embarrass River flows through the east–central and southeast portions of Embarrass Township. The Pike River flows through the western portion of the township. Bear Creek flows through the eastern part of the township.

=== Adjacent townships, cities, and communities ===
The following are adjacent to Embarrass Township:

- White Township (south)
- The city of Hoyt Lakes (southeast)
- Waasa Township (east)
- Bear Island State Forest (northeast)
- Kugler Township (north)
- Vermilion Lake Township (northwest)
- Pike Township (west)
- Hay Lake Unorganized Territory (southwest)

=== Unincorporated communities ===
- Embarrass

== Demographics ==
As of the census of 2000, there were 691 people, 290 households, and 196 families residing in the township. The population density was 21.1 inhabitants per square mile (8.1/km^{2}). There were 330 housing units at an average density of 10.1 per square mile (3.9/km^{2}). The racial makeup of the township was 98.41% White, 0.14% African American, 0.58% Native American, 0.14% Asian, 0.14% from other races, and 0.58% from two or more races. Hispanic or Latino of any race were 0.43% of the population.

There were 290 households, out of which 23.8% had children under the age of 18 living with them, 57.6% were married couples living together, 5.2% had a female householder with no husband present, and 32.4% were non-families. 26.9% of all households were made up of individuals, and 8.6% had someone living alone who was 65 years of age or older. The average household size was 2.37 and the average family size was 2.87.

In the township the population was spread out, with 22.0% under the age of 18, 6.2% from 18 to 24, 25.8% from 25 to 44, 30.4% from 45 to 64, and 15.6% who were 65 years of age or older. The median age was 43 years. For every 100 females, there were 106.3 males. For every 100 females age 18 and over, there were 104.2 males.

The median income for a household in the township was $36,111, and the median income for a family was $44,444. Males had a median income of $40,855 versus $21,786 for females. The per capita income for the township was $17,983. About 6.6% of families and 8.6% of the population were below the poverty line, including 5.9% of those under age 18 and 5.2% of those age 65 or over.

== Name origins ==
The township took its name from the Embarrass River.

== Media ==
The official newspaper of Embarrass is The Timberjay. The Timberjay is published weekly, with a circulation of over 1000.

== Gallery ==
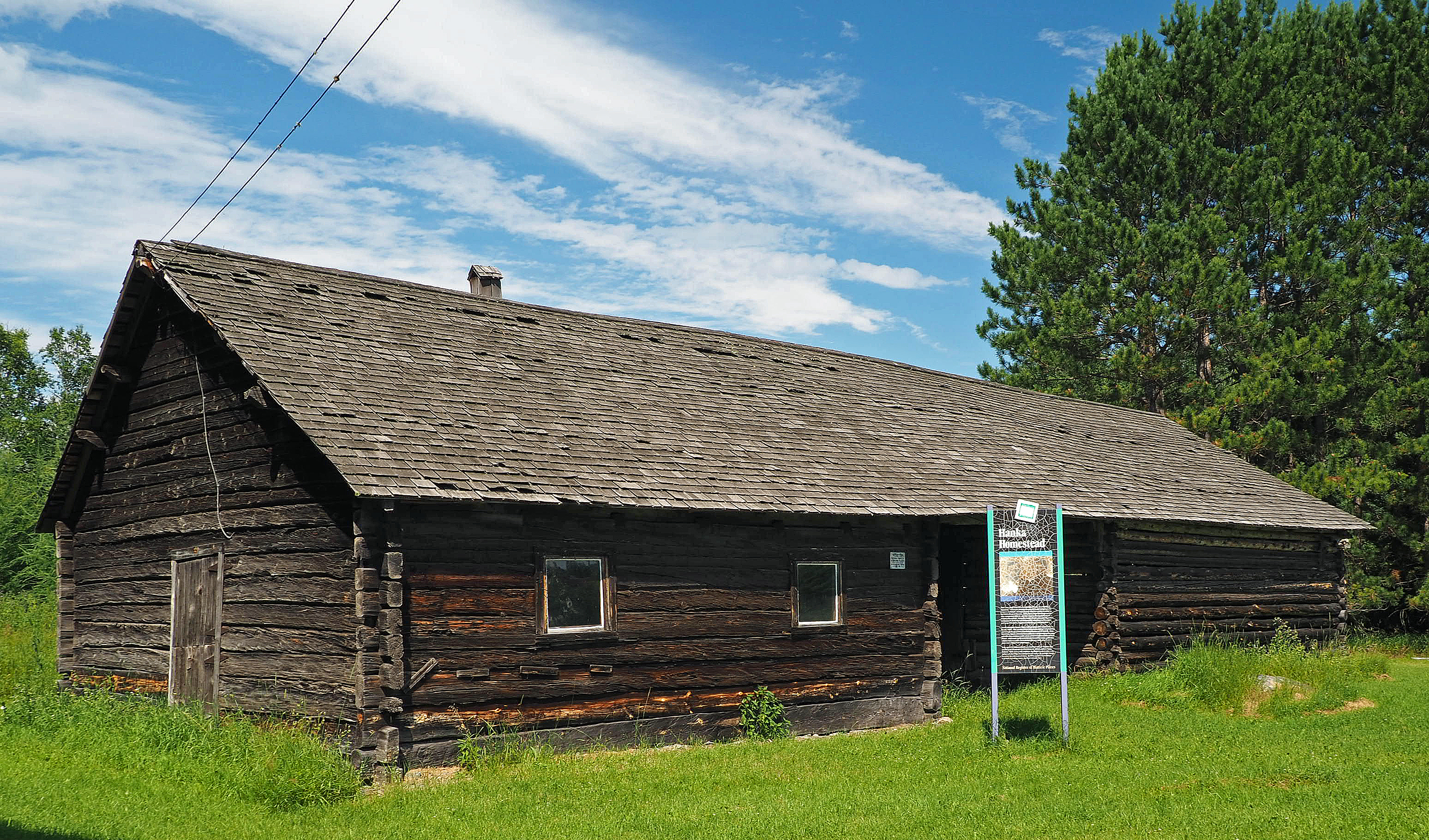
The Gregorius and Mary Hanka Farmstead

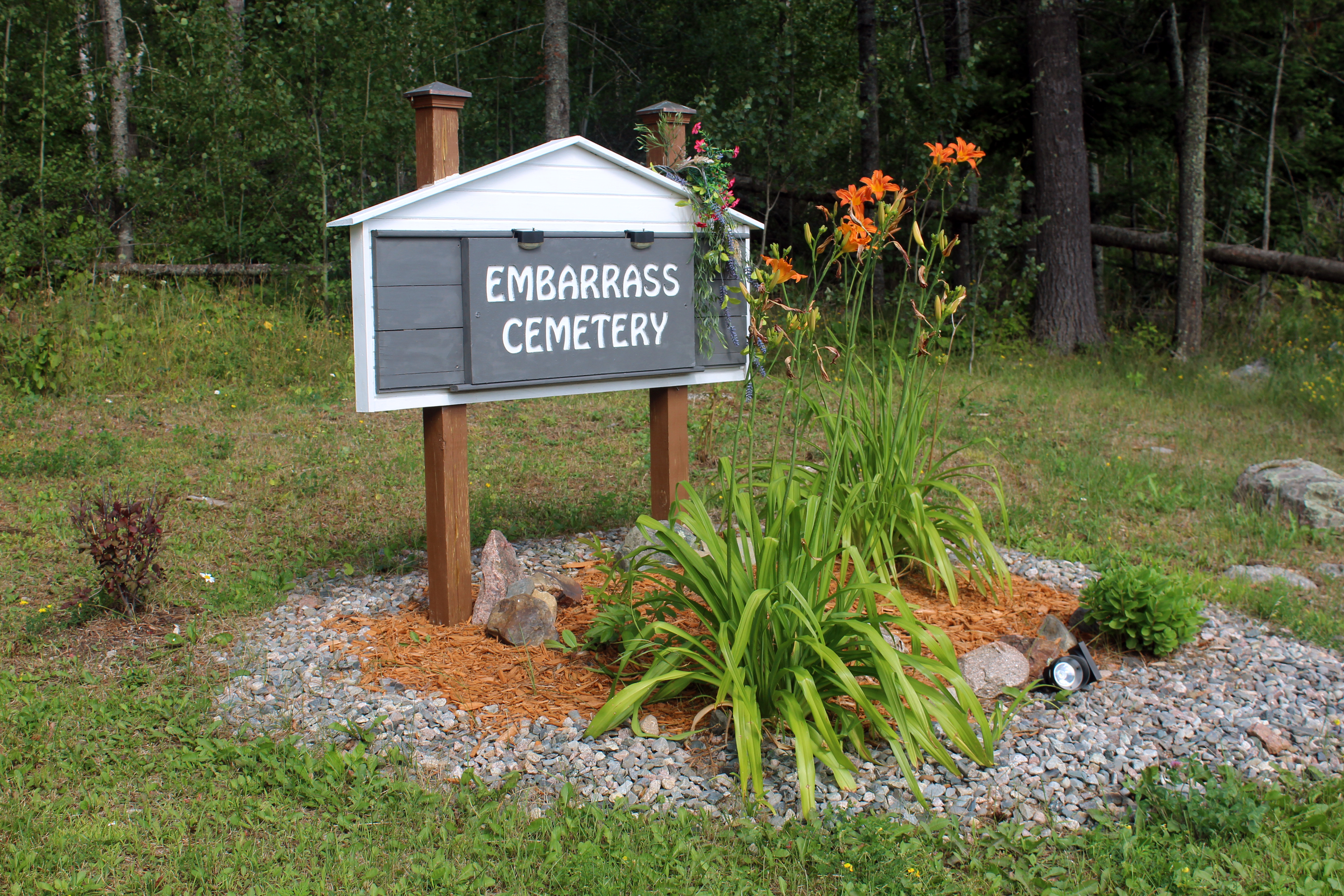
Embarrass Cemetery

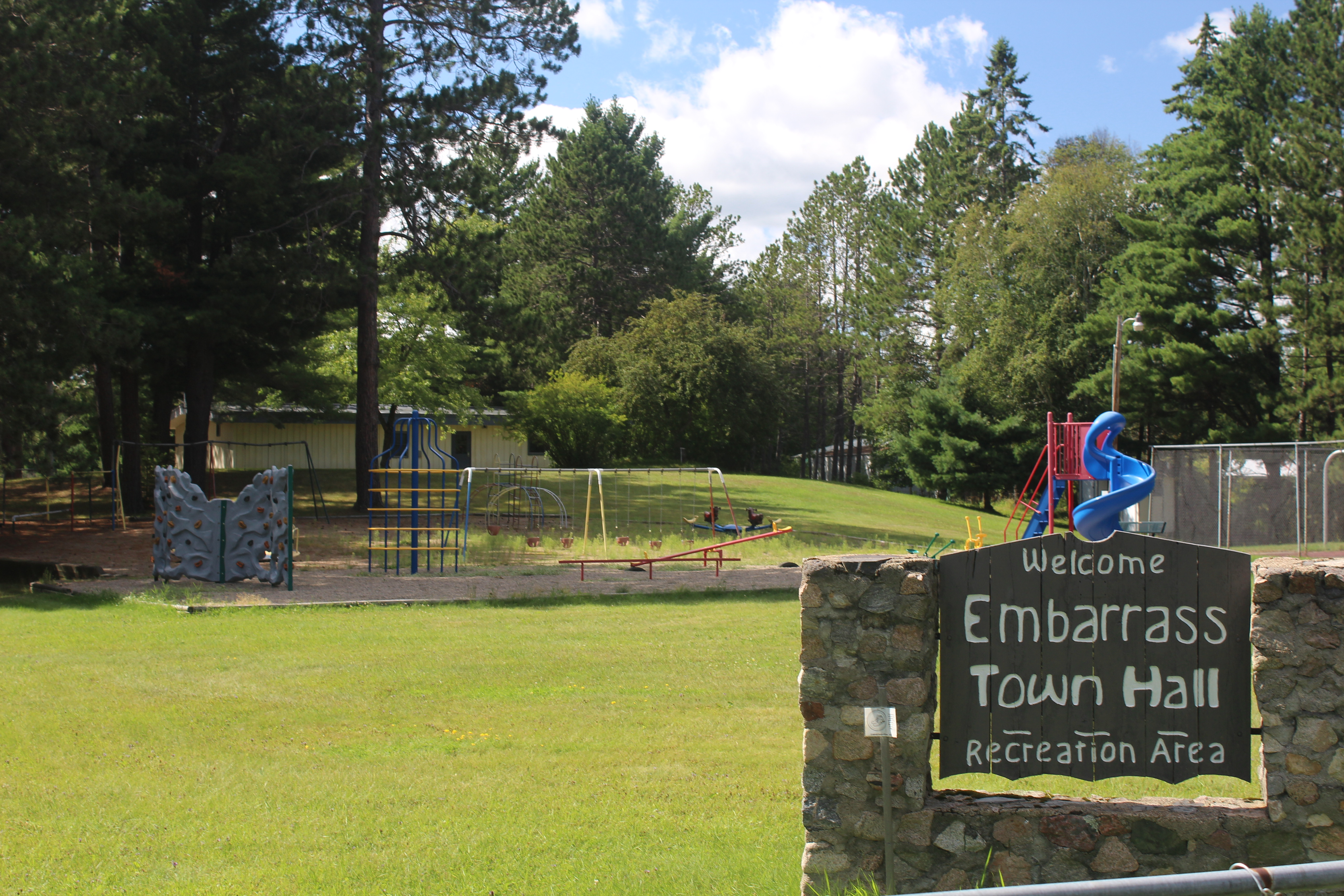
Recreation area

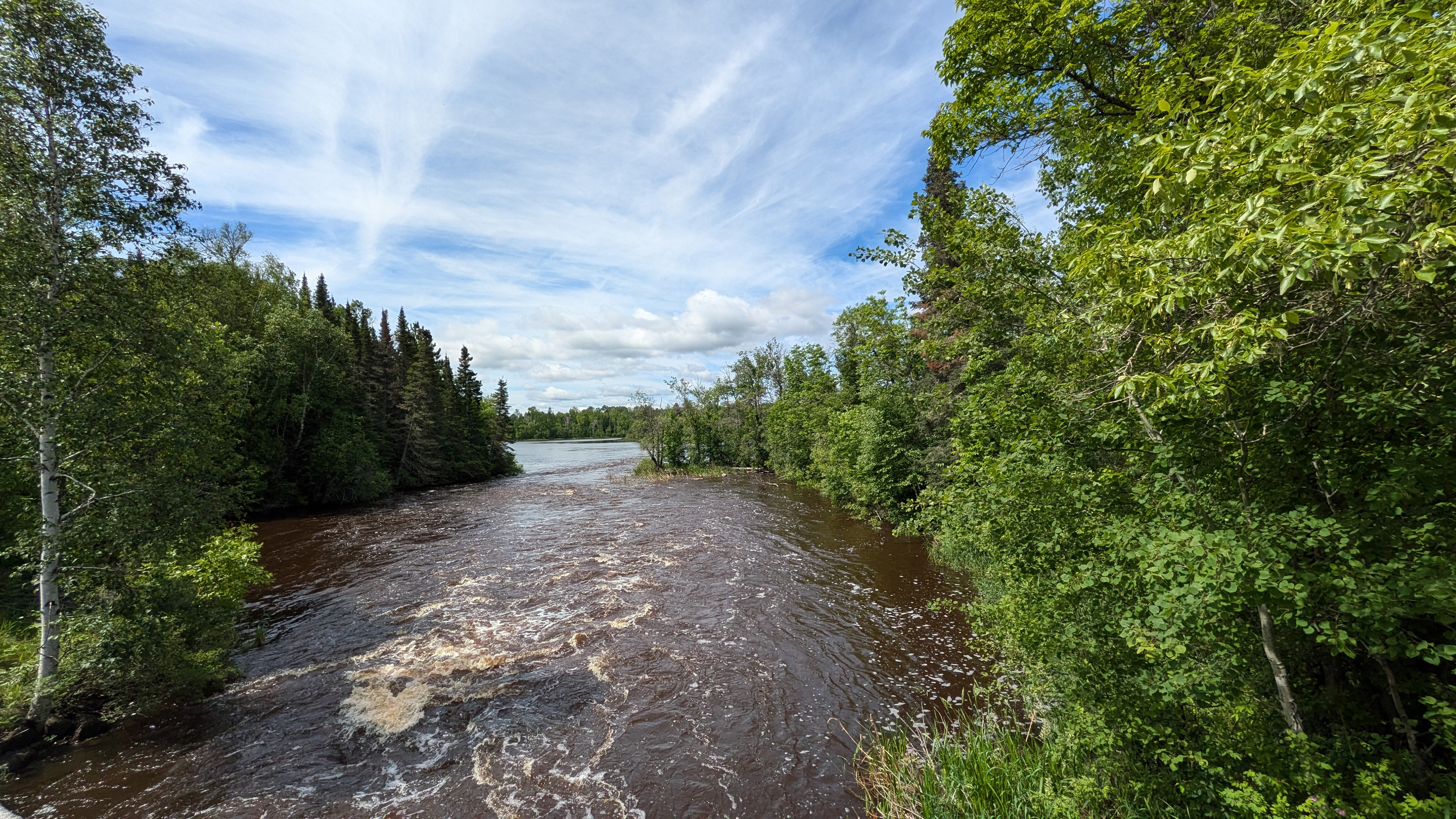
Embarrass River
