= Borton, Illinois =

Borton
- Unincorporated community
- Edgar County's location in Illinois

- Borton's location in Edgar County
- Coordinates: 39°39′21″N 87°56′02″W
- Country: United States
- State: Illinois
- County: Edgar County
- Township: Embarrass Township
- Elevation: 663 ft (202 m)
- ZIP code: 61917
- Area code: 217
- GNIS feature ID: 0404704

Borton is an unincorporated community in Embarrass Township, Edgar County, Illinois, United States.

== Notable person ==
- Robert F. Casey, Illinois state legislator and lawyer, was born in Borton.
