= Embarrassment (disambiguation) =

Embarrassment is an emotional state experienced upon having an unacceptable act or condition witnessed by or revealed to others.

Embarrassment may also refer to:

- "Embarrassment" (song), a 1980 ska song recorded by Madness
- The Embarrassment, an early punk group
- "Embarrassment" (Don't Wait Up), a 1985 television episode
- "Embarrassment" (Ned's Declassified School Survival Guide episode), a 2006 television episode
- An embarrassment, which is a group of pandas
- Embarrassment, a character from Inside Out 2
