= Embarrass, Minnesota =

Embarrass
- Unincorporated community
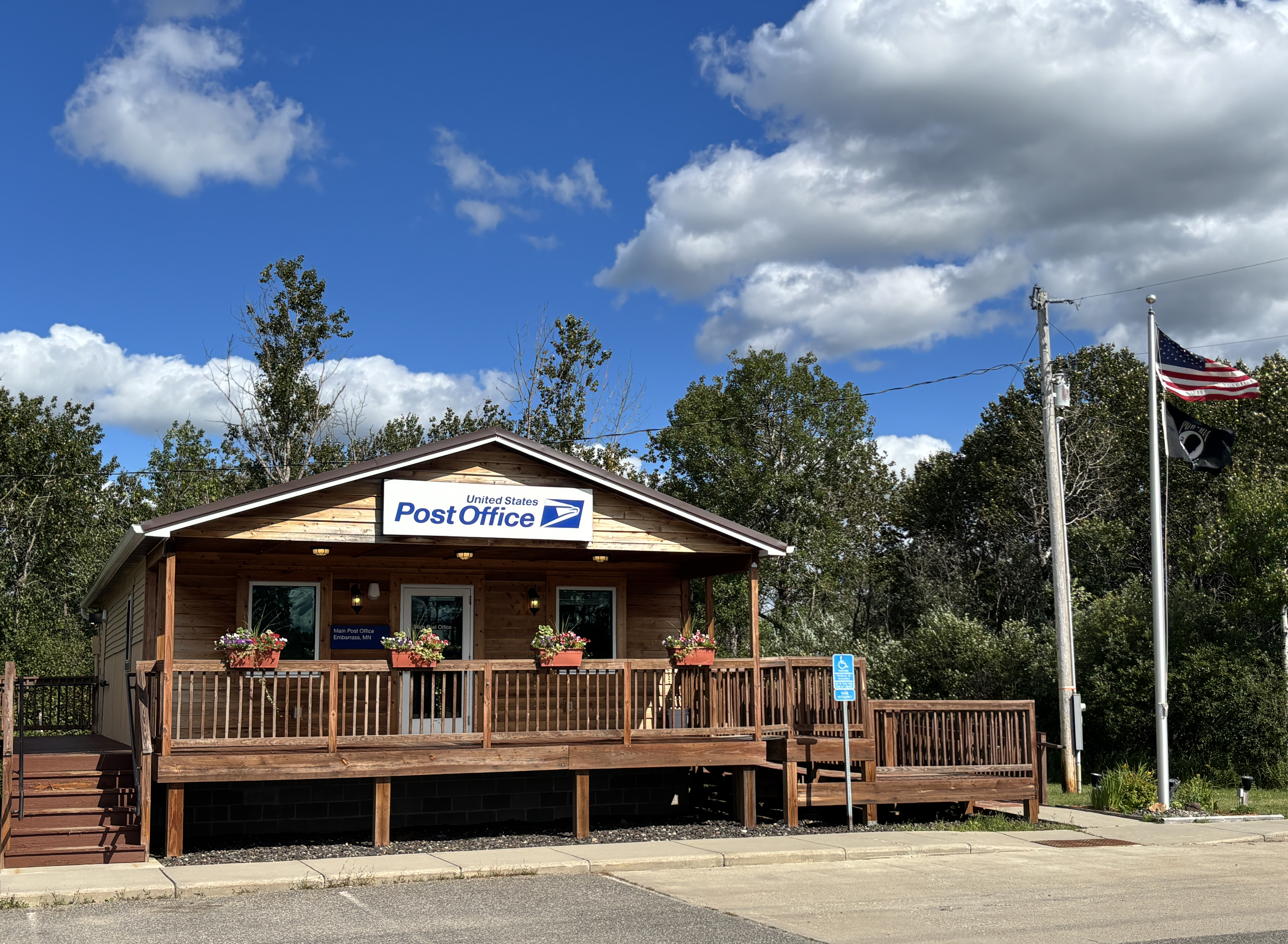
- Embarrass Post Office
- Motto: "The Cold Spot"
- Location within Minnesota Location within the United States
- Coordinates: 47°39′33″N 92°11′53″W
- Country: United States
- State: Minnesota
- County: Saint Louis
- Township: Embarrass Township
- Elevation: 1,424 ft (434 m)

Population
  - Total: 30
- Time zone: UTC−6 (Central (CST))
  - Summer (DST): UTC−5 (CDT)
- ZIP codes: 55732
- Area code: 218
- GNIS feature ID: 661211

Embarrass is an unincorporated community in Embarrass Township, Saint Louis County, Minnesota, United States.

The community is located on the Mesabi Iron Range. With an average annual temperature of 36.4 °F (2.4 °C), Embarrass is notable as the coldest place in Minnesota.

== Geography and climate ==
The community of Embarrass is located 22 miles (35 km) northeast of the city of Virginia; and 27 miles (43 km) southwest of Ely. Embarrass is 12 miles (19 km) south of Tower; and 86 miles (138 km) north of Duluth. Nearby places include Tower, Aurora, Hoyt Lakes, Biwabik, and Babbitt.

The center of Embarrass is generally considered near the intersection of Saint Louis County Roads 21, 362 (Waisanen Road), and 615 (Salo Road); located in the southeast portion of Embarrass Township (population 607). The Embarrass River flows through the community. The Pike River is also nearby.

State Highway 135 (MN 135), Saint Louis County Highway 21 (CR 21), and County Road 26 (CR 26) are three of the main routes in the Embarrass area.

Embarrass has a humid continental climate (Köppen Dfb), bordering very closely on a subarctic climate (Dfc), with short, warm summers and long, bitterly cold winters, very similar to Siberia. Summer nights remain cool despite the warm days. With an average annual temperature of 36.4 °F (2.4 °C), Embarrass is the coldest place in Minnesota. In winter 2000–2001, the temperature in Embarrass did not rise above freezing from November 24 to March 1; the high for meteorological winter (December to February) was 32 °F on January 10. The coldest calendar month on record (since 1995, with some months missing data) in Embarrass was January 2014, with an average temperature of −8.3 °F (−22.4 °C).

In January 2005, Embarrass had a near-record low temperature of −54 °F (−48 °C). The unofficial low temperature is −64 °F (−53 °C), which was reached in February 1996. The thermometer that measured this temperature was verified for accuracy by Taylor Environmental Instruments, but as it was not recorded at a National Weather Service Cooperative Site, it will remain unofficial. The current record low temperature for Minnesota −60 °F (−51 °C) was recorded outside of the nearby town of Tower on February 2, 1996, by the NWS Cooperative Observer located there.

Embarrass averages a coldest daytime high of the year at −11 °F (−24 °C) with a record low daily high of −29 °F (−34 °C) during the 1996 cold wave. The warmest night of the year averages 63 °F (17 °C) with the warmest low on record being 69 °F (21 °C).

The average first and last dates for a freeze are August 31 and June 20, giving Embarrass a short average growing season of only 72 days. By contrast, the growing season of Fairbanks is approximately 100 days, even though the latter has slightly colder temperatures overall.

Climate data for Embarrass, Minnesota (1991–2020 normals, extremes 1994–present)
Month	Jan	Feb	Mar	Apr	May	Jun	Jul	Aug	Sep	Oct	Nov	Dec	Year
Record high °F (°C)	44 (7)	55 (13)	74 (23)	78 (26)	88 (31)	96 (36)	96 (36)	92 (33)	94 (34)	84 (29)	72 (22)	48 (9)	96 (36)
Mean maximum °F (°C)	35.1 (1.7)	38.9 (3.8)	55.9 (13.3)	68.6 (20.3)	80.7 (27.1)	83.5 (28.6)	87.3 (30.7)	85.1 (29.5)	80.1 (26.7)	69.8 (21.0)	51.7 (10.9)	37.9 (3.3)	88.3 (31.3)
Mean daily maximum °F (°C)	16.8 (−8.4)	22.7 (−5.2)	36.0 (2.2)	49.8 (9.9)	63.7 (17.6)	72.7 (22.6)	77.7 (25.4)	75.5 (24.2)	66.1 (18.9)	50.6 (10.3)	34.4 (1.3)	21.8 (−5.7)	49.0 (9.4)
Daily mean °F (°C)	4.7 (−15.2)	8.9 (−12.8)	22.2 (−5.4)	36.2 (2.3)	49.1 (9.5)	59.0 (15.0)	63.5 (17.5)	61.4 (16.3)	53.4 (11.9)	40.1 (4.5)	25.8 (−3.4)	12.1 (−11.1)	36.4 (2.4)
Mean daily minimum °F (°C)	−7.3 (−21.8)	−5.0 (−20.6)	8.5 (−13.1)	22.7 (−5.2)	34.5 (1.4)	45.3 (7.4)	49.2 (9.6)	47.2 (8.4)	40.8 (4.9)	29.7 (−1.3)	17.2 (−8.2)	2.5 (−16.4)	23.8 (−4.6)
Mean minimum °F (°C)	−38.1 (−38.9)	−35.5 (−37.5)	−24.5 (−31.4)	2.7 (−16.3)	20.9 (−6.2)	28.3 (−2.1)	36.9 (2.7)	33.5 (0.8)	24.1 (−4.4)	13.9 (−10.1)	−6.0 (−21.1)	−26.7 (−32.6)	−40.7 (−40.4)
Record low °F (°C)	−57 (−49)	−55 (−48)	−44 (−42)	−14 (−26)	8 (−13)	23 (−5)	27 (−3)	23 (−5)	17 (−8)	1 (−17)	−25 (−32)	−50 (−46)	−57 (−49)
Average precipitation inches (mm)	0.82 (21)	0.68 (17)	1.22 (31)	1.98 (50)	2.99 (76)	4.35 (110)	3.62 (92)	3.45 (88)	3.86 (98)	2.91 (74)	1.11 (28)	1.15 (29)	28.14 (715)
Average snowfall inches (cm)	13.2 (34)	11.5 (29)	8.0 (20)	4.4 (11)	0.3 (0.76)	0.0 (0.0)	0.0 (0.0)	0.0 (0.0)	0.0 (0.0)	1.4 (3.6)	7.3 (19)	15.5 (39)	61.6 (156.36)
Average extreme snow depth inches (cm)	15.5 (39)	20.3 (52)	18.6 (47)	9.1 (23)	0.4 (1.0)	0.0 (0.0)	0.0 (0.0)	0.0 (0.0)	0.0 (0.0)	0.9 (2.3)	4.7 (12)	11.4 (29)	21.9 (56)
Average precipitation days (≥ 0.01 in)	7.8	6.9	6.6	7.4	11.7	13.0	10.6	9.5	10.9	11.9	10.1	10.0	116.4
Average snowy days (≥ 0.1 in)	8.3	6.9	4.3	2.0	0.3	0.0	0.0	0.0	0.0	1.2	7.0	9.6	39.6
Source: NOAA (mean maxima/minima, snow/snowdays/snow depth 2006–2020)

== Name origins ==
The name Embarrass was derived from the French word embarras, based on its meaning of "to hinder with obstacles or difficulties". It was given this name by the French fur traders who were some of the first Europeans to visit the area, and who found the narrow, shallow river very difficult to navigate, and named the river "Embarras".

== See also ==
- Embarrass Township

== Gallery ==
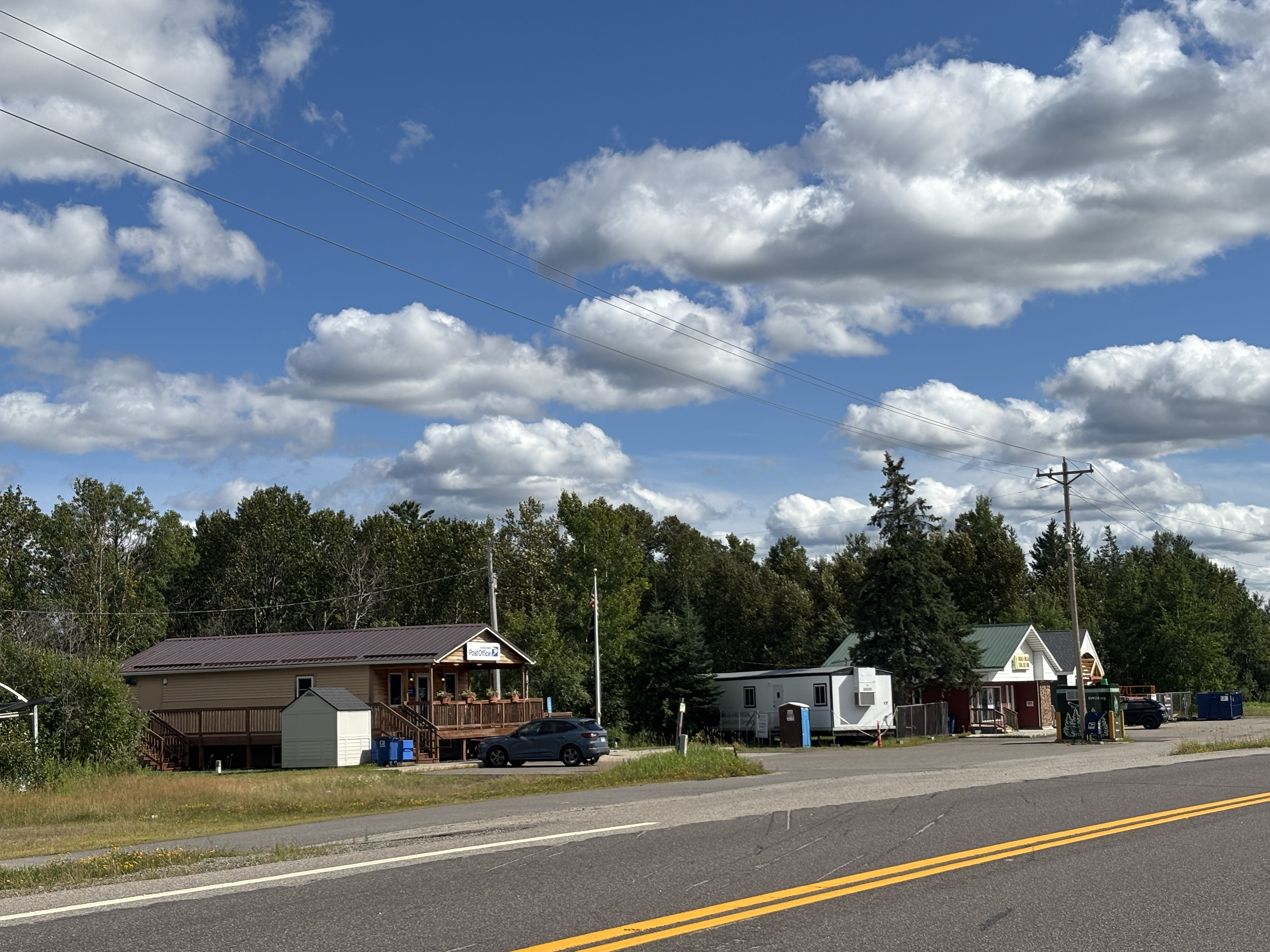
Commercial center

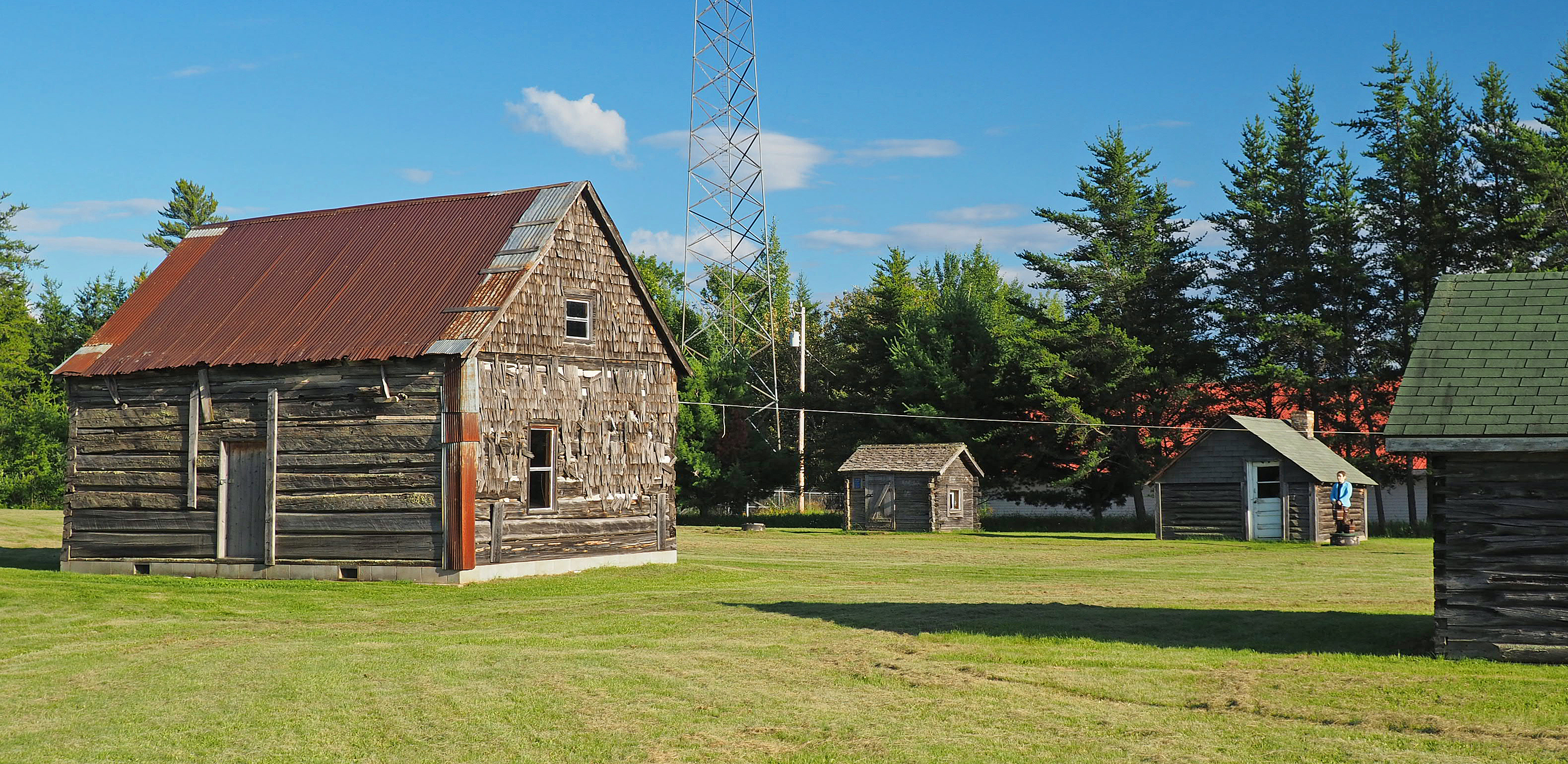
Nelimark Homestead Museum

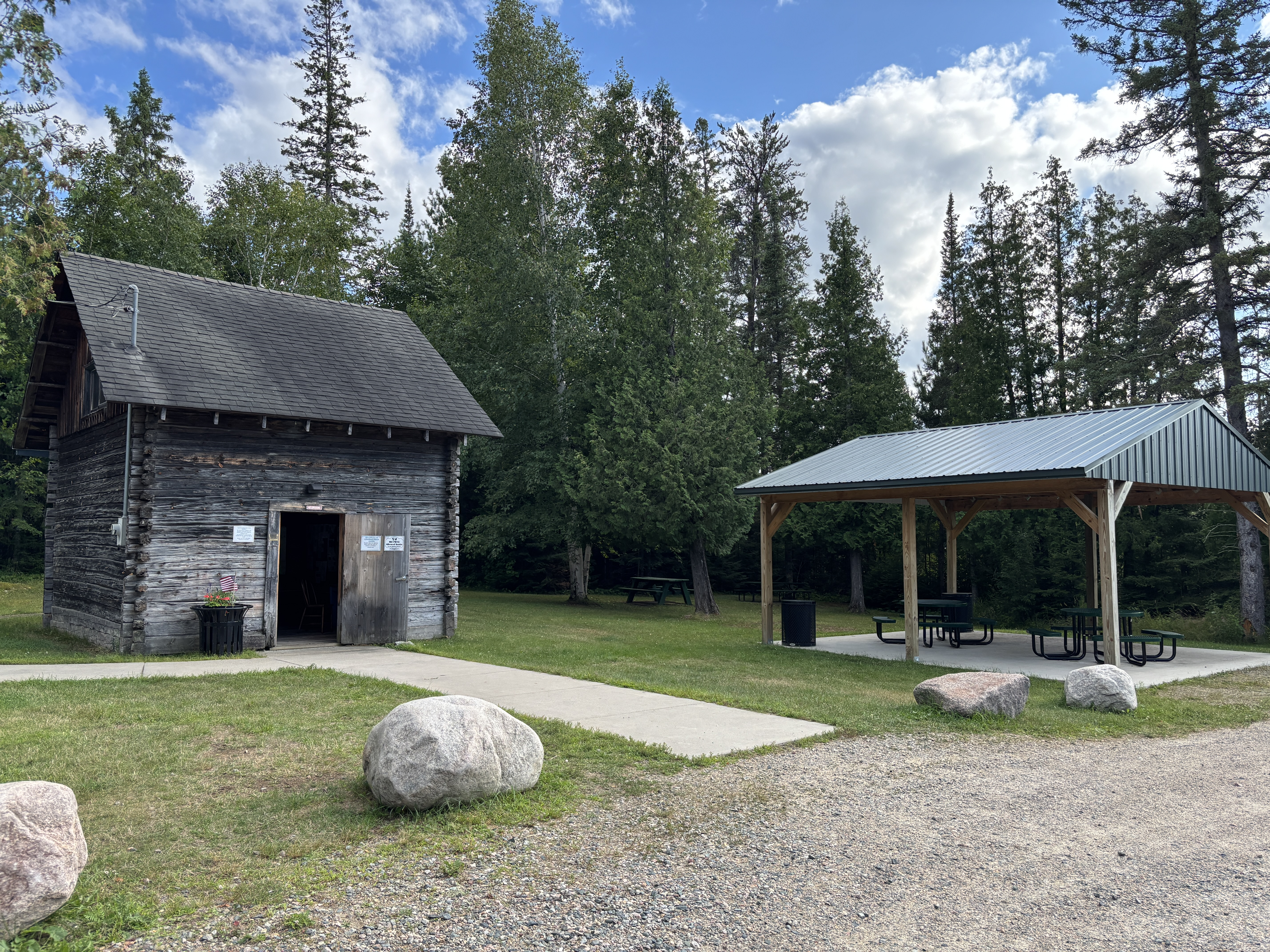
Embarrass Visitor Center

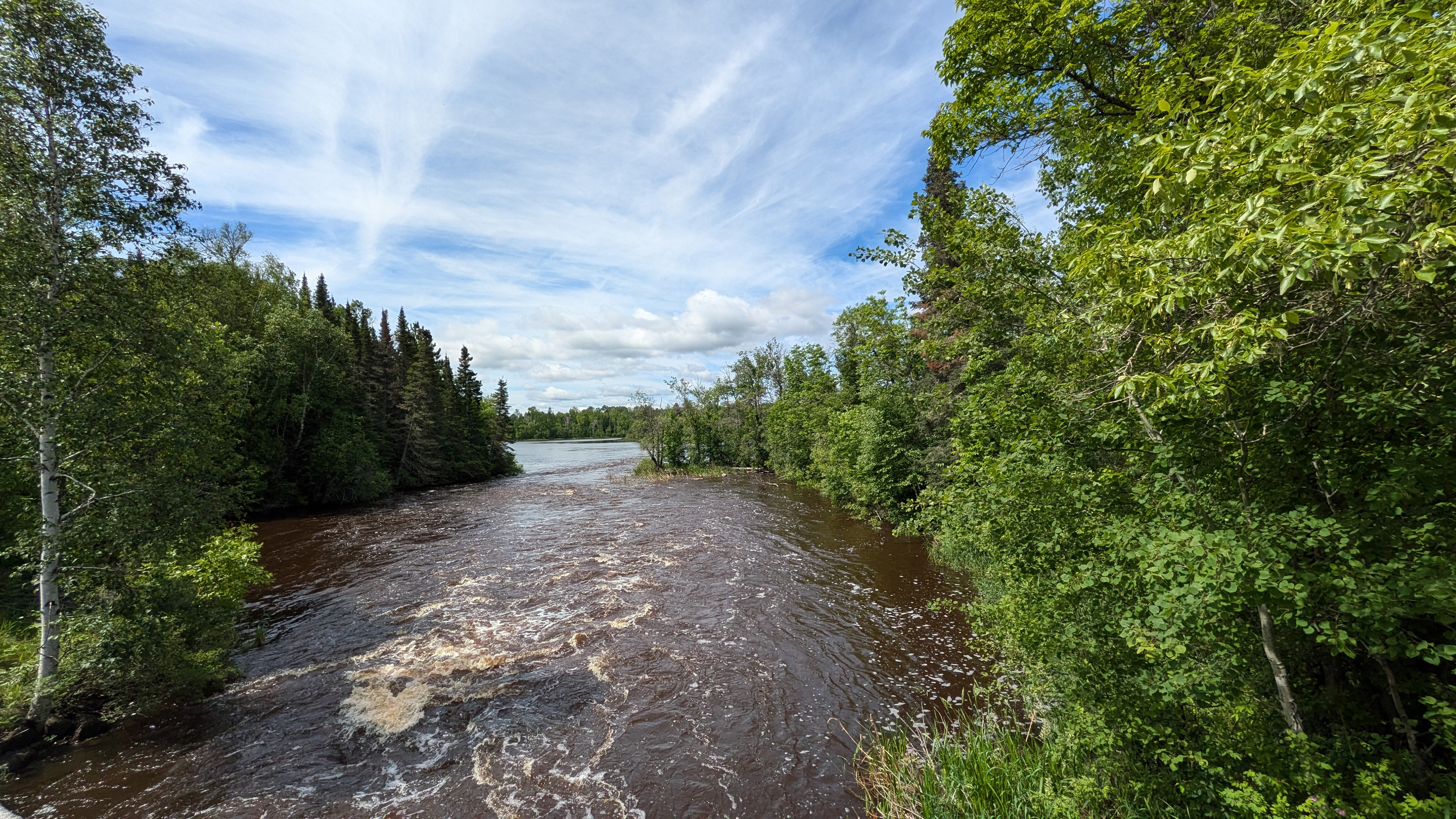
Embarrass River

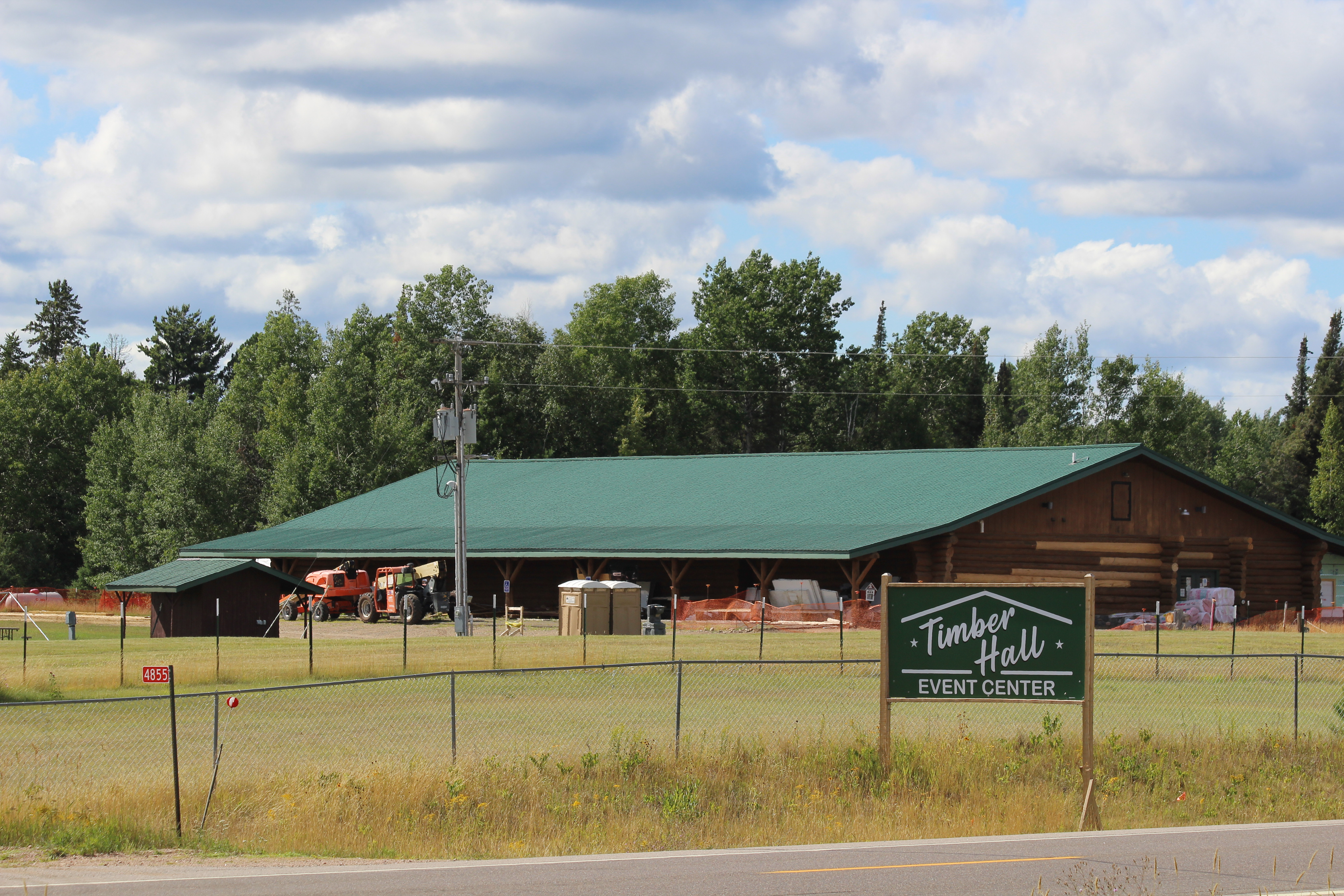
Timber Hall Event Center

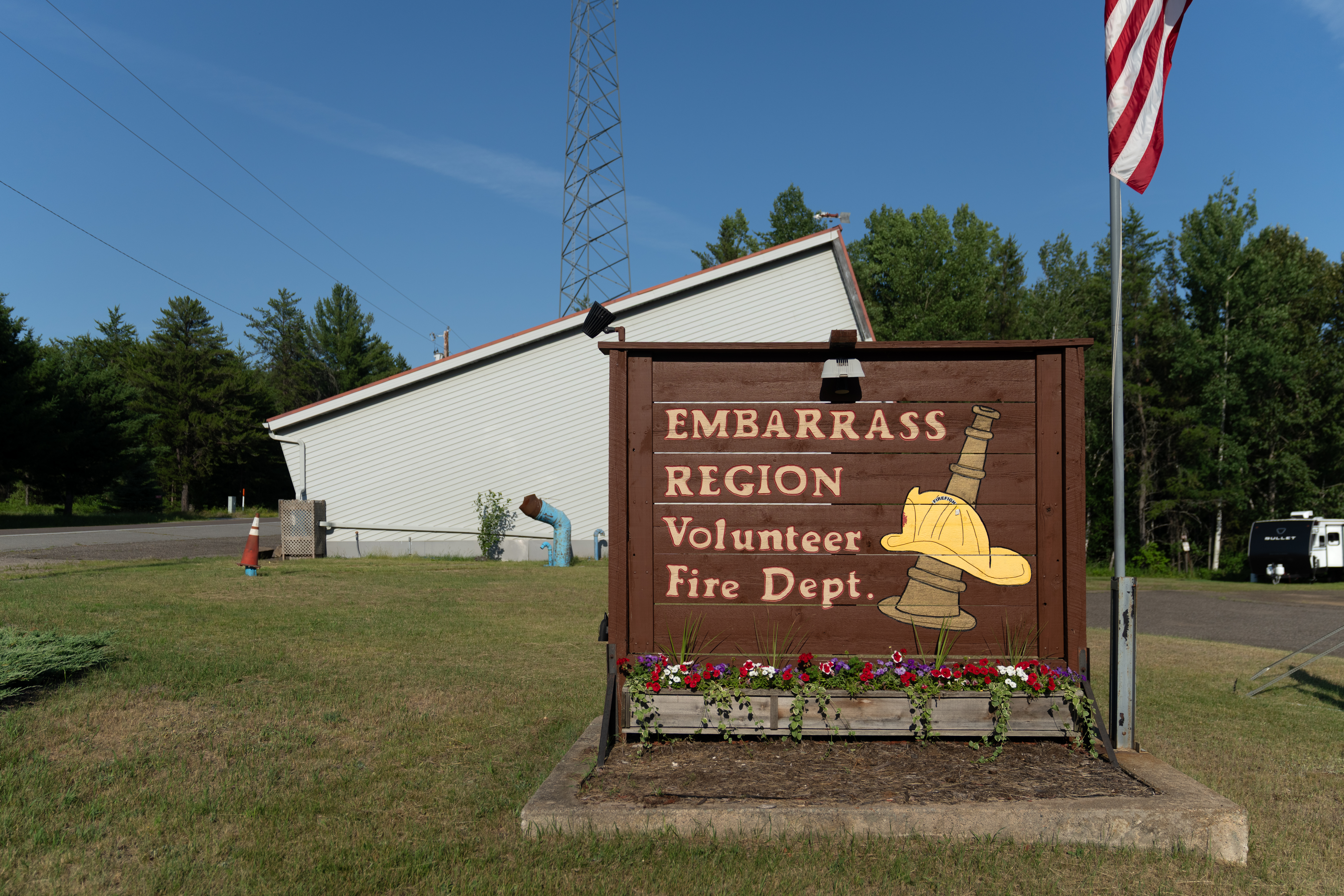
Region Volunteer Fire Department
