= Embarrass Township, Edgar County, Illinois =

Embarrass Township
- Township
- Location in Edgar County

- Edgar County's location in Illinois
- Coordinates: 39°40′23″N 87°55′05″W
- Country: United States
- State: Illinois
- County: Edgar
- Established: November 4, 1856

Area
  - Total: 44.26 sq mi (114.6 km^{2})
  - Land: 44.26 sq mi (114.6 km^{2})
  - Water: 0 sq mi (0 km^{2}) 0%
- Elevation: 673 ft (205 m)

Population (2020)
  - Total: 573
  - Density: 12.9/sq mi (5.00/km^{2})
- Time zone: UTC-6 (CST)
  - Summer (DST): UTC-5 (CDT)
- ZIP codes: 61917, 61933, 61943, 61944, 61949
- FIPS code: 17-045-23958

Embarrass Township is one of fifteen townships in Edgar County, Illinois, USA. As of the 2020 census, its population was 573 and it contained 259 housing units.

== Geography ==
According to the 2021 census gazetteer files, Embarrass Township has a total area of 44.26 square miles (114.63 km^{2}), all land.

=== Cities, towns, villages ===
- Brocton

=== Unincorporated towns ===
- Borton
- Isabel

=== Extinct towns ===
- Catfish
- New Athens

=== Cemeteries ===
The township contains these five cemeteries: Catfish, Catfish Point, Embarrass, Scott and Zimmerman. Shield cemetery lies on Coles county line, half in Embarrass township. Housel cemetery has records also.

=== Major highways ===
- Illinois Route 49
- Illinois Route 133

=== Airports and landing strips ===
- Ewing Landing Strip
- Lamkey Landing Strip

== Demographics ==
As of the 2020 census there were 573 people, 255 households, and 170 families residing in the township. The population density was 12.95 inhabitants per square mile (5.00/km^{2}). There were 259 housing units at an average density of 5.85 per square mile (2.26/km^{2}). The racial makeup of the township was 97.03% White, 0.52% African American, 0.17% Native American, 0.00% Asian, 0.00% Pacific Islander, 0.35% from other races, and 1.92% from two or more races. Hispanic or Latino of any race were 0.87% of the population.

There were 255 households, out of which 26.70% had children under the age of 18 living with them, 51.76% were married couples living together, 10.98% had a female householder with no spouse present, and 33.33% were non-families. 26.70% of all households were made up of individuals, and 18.00% had someone living alone who was 65 years of age or older. The average household size was 2.20 and the average family size was 2.57.

The township's age distribution consisted of 20.1% under the age of 18, 4.8% from 18 to 24, 15.7% from 25 to 44, 35.8% from 45 to 64, and 23.5% who were 65 years of age or older. The median age was 49.6 years. For every 100 females, there were 119.1 males. For every 100 females age 18 and over, there were 100.0 males.

The median income for a household in the township was $49,028, and the median income for a family was $62,500. Males had a median income of $39,375 versus $26,842 for females. The per capita income for the township was $26,222. About 6.5% of families and 11.3% of the population were below the poverty line, including 17.0% of those under age 18 and 4.5% of those age 65 or over.

Historical population
Census	Pop.	Note	%±
1930	1,228		—
1940	1,406		14.5%
1950	1,279		−9.0%
1960	1,134		−11.3%
1970	921		−18.8%
1980	943		2.4%
1990	696		−26.2%
2000	685		−1.6%
2010	620		−9.5%
2020	573		−7.6%
U.S. Decennial Census

== School districts ==
- Kansas Community Unit School District 3
- Oakland Community Unit School District 5
- Shiloh Community Unit School District 1

== Political districts ==
- Illinois' 15th congressional district
- State House District 110
- State Senate District 55
