= Babbitt, Minnesota =

City in Minnesota, United States

- City
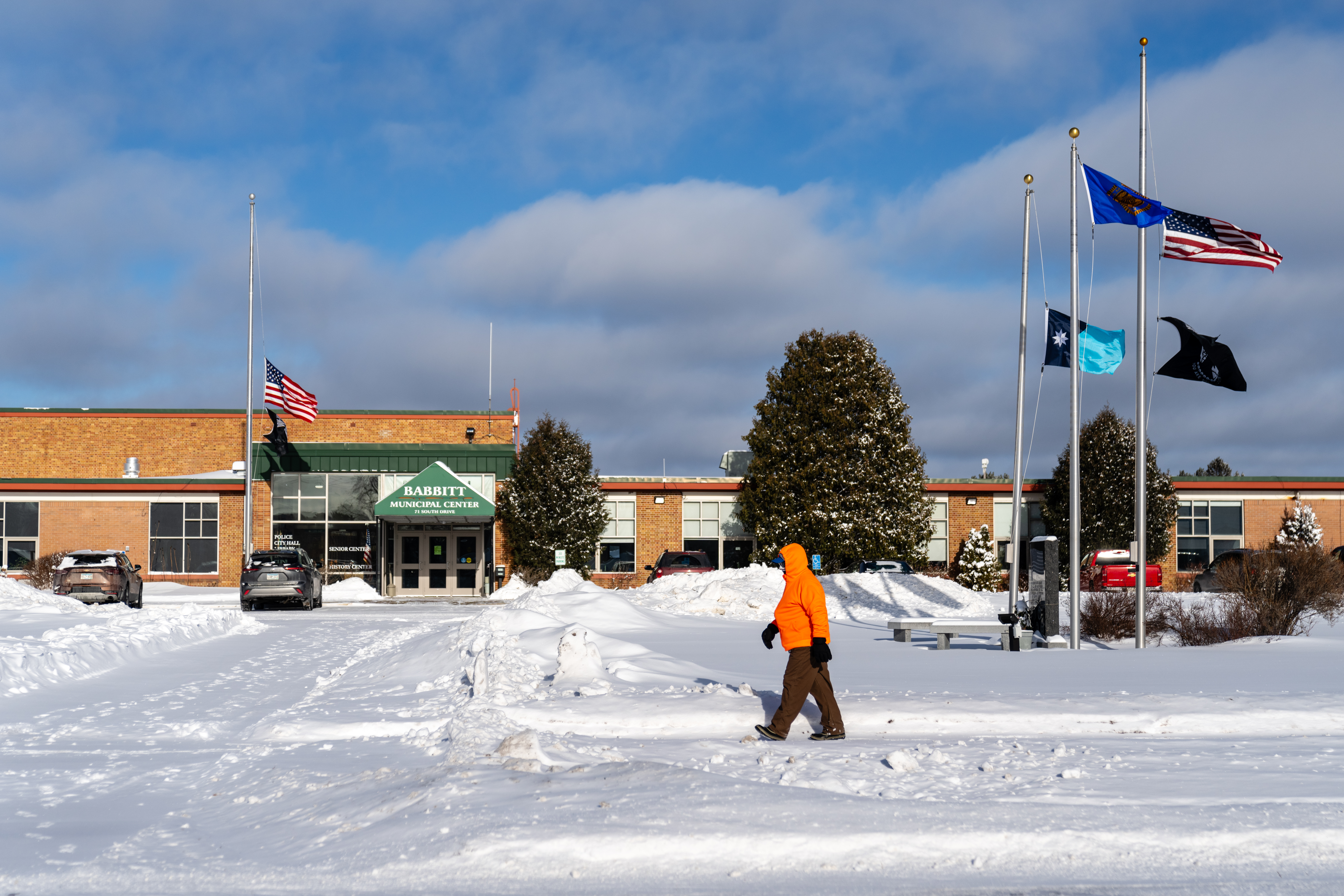
- Babbit Municipal Center

- Location of the city of Babbitt within Saint Louis County, Minnesota
- Coordinates: 47°42′31″N 91°56′41″W
- Country: United States
- State: Minnesota
- County: Saint Louis
- Incorporated: September 12, 1956

Government
  - Mayor: Duane Lossing

Area
  - Total: 106.90 sq mi (276.87 km^{2})
  - Land: 106.09 sq mi (274.77 km^{2})
  - Water: 0.81 sq mi (2.10 km^{2})
- Elevation: 1,483 ft (452 m)

Population (2020)
  - Total: 1,397
  - Estimate (2022): 1,383
  - Density: 14/sq mi (5.4/km^{2})
- Time zone: UTC−6 (Central (CST))
  - Summer (DST): UTC−5 (CDT)
- ZIP Code: 55706
- Area code: 218
- FIPS code: 27-03106
- GNIS feature ID: 0660701
- Sales tax: 7.375%
- Website: www.babbittmn.gov

Babbitt is a city in St. Louis County, Minnesota, United States. The population was 1,397 at the 2020 census.

Saint Louis County Highway 21 (CR 21) serves as a main route in the community.

== History ==
The city grew out of the formation of a taconite mine built by Armco and Republic Steel starting in 1944. The company town was built near the eastern edge of the Mesabi Iron Range. The city of Silver Bay was built simultaneously along Lake Superior (60 miles to the southeast), and connected by train, for transportation of iron ore to cities along the Great Lakes. Babbitt is named after Judge Kurnal R. Babbitt of New York City. Judge Babbitt, who died on February 15, 1920, was general counsel for and a director of several mining companies. Before removing to New York in 1908, he practiced law in Colorado at Aspen, Cripple Creek and Colorado Springs.

== Geography ==
According to the United States Census Bureau, the city has an area of 106.72 square miles (276.40 km^{2}); 105.91 square miles (274.31 km^{2}) is land and 0.81 square miles (2.10 km^{2}) is water.

Climate data for Babbitt, Minnesota (1991–2020)
Month	Jan	Feb	Mar	Apr	May	Jun	Jul	Aug	Sep	Oct	Nov	Dec	Year
Record high °F (°C)	45 (7)	59 (15)	76 (24)	82 (28)	90 (32)	92 (33)	97 (36)	96 (36)	90 (32)	80 (27)	74 (23)	46 (8)	97 (36)
Mean daily maximum °F (°C)	15.5 (−9.2)	20.9 (−6.2)	34.4 (1.3)	48.0 (8.9)	62.3 (16.8)	72.1 (22.3)	77.0 (25.0)	74.8 (23.8)	65.3 (18.5)	49.9 (9.9)	33.7 (0.9)	20.5 (−6.4)	47.9 (8.8)
Daily mean °F (°C)	4.1 (−15.5)	8.1 (−13.3)	22.0 (−5.6)	36.4 (2.4)	50.4 (10.2)	60.7 (15.9)	65.2 (18.4)	62.8 (17.1)	53.5 (11.9)	40.3 (4.6)	25.7 (−3.5)	11.3 (−11.5)	36.7 (2.6)
Mean daily minimum °F (°C)	−7.4 (−21.9)	−4.8 (−20.4)	9.7 (−12.4)	24.7 (−4.1)	38.5 (3.6)	49.2 (9.6)	53.3 (11.8)	50.8 (10.4)	41.7 (5.4)	30.7 (−0.7)	17.8 (−7.9)	2.2 (−16.6)	21.4 (−5.9)
Record low °F (°C)	−51 (−46)	−46 (−43)	−38 (−39)	−11 (−24)	17 (−8)	27 (−3)	33 (1)	29 (−2)	20 (−7)	5 (−15)	−15 (−26)	−42 (−41)	−51 (−46)
Average precipitation inches (mm)	1.21 (31)	0.85 (22)	1.04 (26)	2.42 (61)	3.93 (100)	3.76 (96)	4.35 (110)	3.56 (90)	3.27 (83)	2.66 (68)	1.64 (42)	1.14 (29)	29.76 (756)
Average snowfall inches (cm)	17.4 (44)	13.5 (34)	10.1 (26)	11.8 (30)	0.5 (1.3)	0 (0)	0 (0)	0 (0)	trace	3.3 (8.4)	10.3 (26)	17.0 (43)	83.9 (213)
Source: NOAA

== Demographics ==
Historical population
Census	Pop.	Note	%±
1960	2,587		—
1970	3,076		18.9%
1980	2,435		−20.8%
1990	1,562		−35.9%
2000	1,670		6.9%
2010	1,475		−11.7%
2020	1,397		−5.3%
2022 (est.)	1,383		−1.0%
U.S. Decennial Census; 2020 Census

=== 2010 census ===
As of the census of 2010, there were 1,475 people, 707 households, and 435 families living in the city. The population density was 13.9 inhabitants per square mile (5.4/km^{2}). There were 818 housing units at an average density of 7.7 per square mile (3.0/km^{2}). The racial makeup of the city was 98.1% White, 0.3% Native American, 0.2% Asian, 0.1% from other races, and 1.3% from two or more races. Hispanic or Latino of any race were 0.1% of the population.

There were 707 households, of which 20.2% had children under the age of 18 living with them, 49.2% were married couples living together, 8.3% had a female householder with no husband present, 4.0% had a male householder with no wife present, and 38.5% were non-families. 34.1% of all households were made up of individuals, and 19.5% had someone living alone who was 65 years of age or older. The average household size was 2.07 and the average family size was 2.60.

The median age in the city was 51.1 years. 17.1% of residents were under the age of 18; 4.3% were between the ages of 18 and 24; 19.1% were from 25 to 44; 28.2% were from 45 to 64; and 31.3% were 65 years of age or older. The gender makeup of the city was 47.9% male and 52.1% female.

=== 2000 census ===
As of the census of 2000, there were 1,670 people, 735 households, and 530 families living in the city. The population density was 15.8 inhabitants per square mile (6.1/km^{2}). There were 801 housing units at an average density of 7.6 per square mile (2.9/km^{2}). The racial makeup of the city was 98.86% White, 0.12% African American, 0.30% American Indian, 0.12% Asian, and 0.60% from two or more races. 20.0% were of German, 16.6% Norwegian, 15.1% Finnish, 6.8% Swedish, 5.8% English and 5.2% Irish ancestry.

There were 735 households, out of which 21.5% had children under the age of 18 living with them, 61.4% were married couples living together, 8.7% had a female householder with no husband present, and 27.8% were non-families. 25.7% of all households were made up of individuals, and 13.9% had someone living alone who was 65 years of age or older. The average household size was 2.27 and the average family size was 2.67.

In the city, the population was spread out, with 21.0% under the age of 18, 4.4% from 18 to 24, 21.8% from 25 to 44, 24.1% from 45 to 64, and 28.7% who were 65 years of age or older. The median age was 47 years. For every 100 females, there were 96.7 males. For every 100 females age 18 and over, there were 94.4 males.

The median income for a household in the city was $33,229, and the median income for a family was $37,137. Males had a median income of $38,214 versus $24,531 for females. The per capita income for the city was $18,853. About 3.6% of families and 6.1% of the population were below the poverty line, including 8.5% of those under the age of 18 and 1.9% of those 65 and older.

== Government ==
- Mayor Andrea Zupancich

== Notable people ==
- Buzz Schneider, Olympic and professional hockey player
- Cory Chisel, songwriter and musician
