= Embarrass River (Minnesota) =

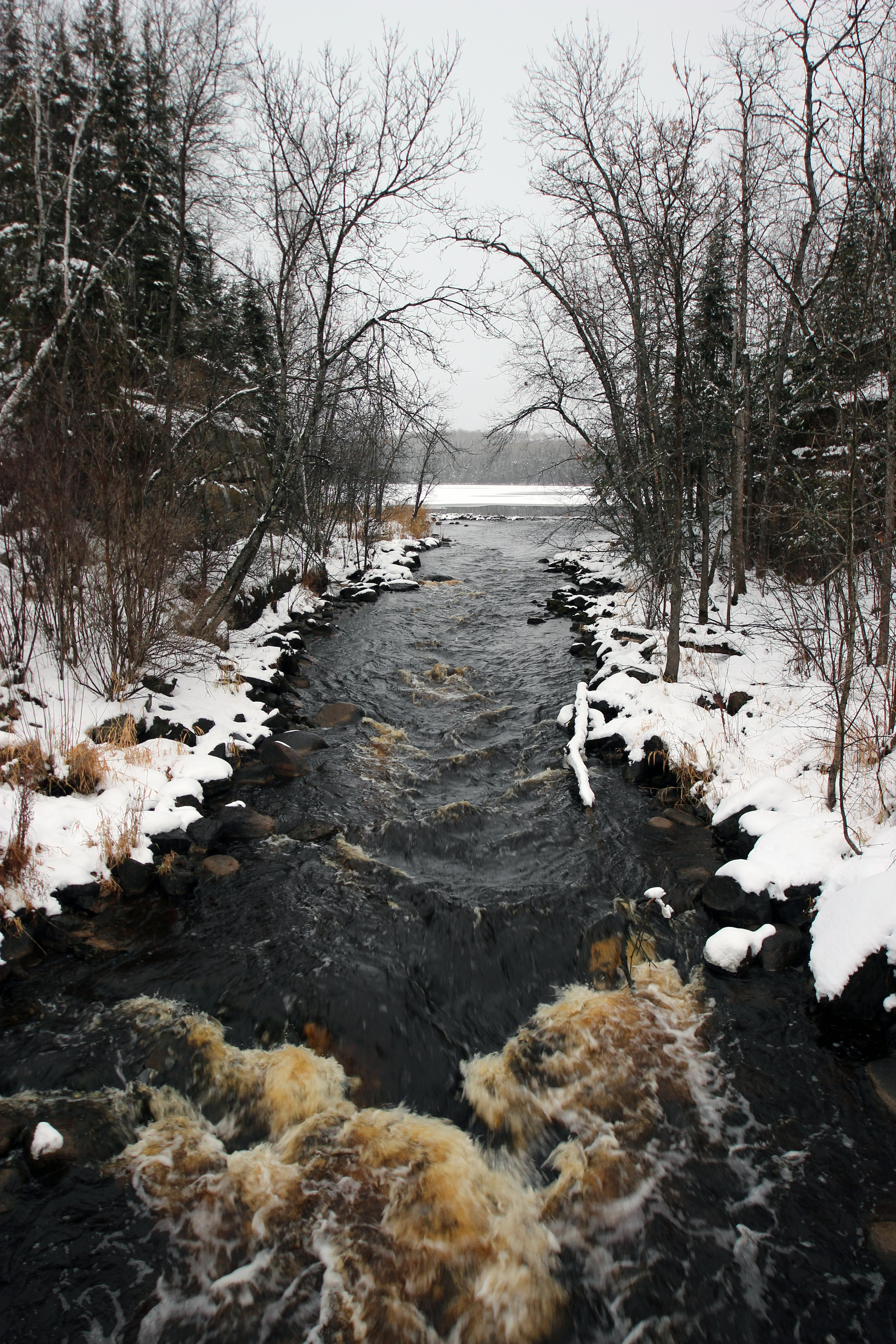
- Embarrass River in Winter

- Mouth of the Embarrass River

Location
- Country: United States
- State: Minnesota
- County: St. Louis County

Physical characteristics
- Source
  - location: Babbitt
  - coordinates: 47.6960296°N 91.9971046°W
- Mouth
  - location: Gilbert
  - coordinates: 47.3921512°N 92.4143509°W
- Length: 50.5-mile-long (81.3 km)

Basin features
- River system: Saint Louis River

The Embarrass River is a 50.5-mile-long (81.3 km) tributary of the Saint Louis River in northern Minnesota, United States. It rises just west of the city of Babbitt and flows southwest, turning briefly south to thread a gap between the Embarrass Mountains to the east and the Mesabi Range to the west. The river flows into the Saint Louis River southeast of Eveleth. During the fur-trading days and the era of exploration, the river was part of a historic trade route from Lower Canada via Lake Superior, across the Height of Land, and down the Rainy River to Lake Winnipeg to the pays d'en haut—the fur-bearing regions of the Canadian northwest.

The river was so named on account of the many obstacles in the rivers to canoeists.

== See also ==
- List of rivers of Minnesota
- List of longest streams of Minnesota
