= Wisconsin Highway 253 =

State highway in Wisconsin, United States

State Trunk Highway 253

Route information
- Maintained by WisDOT
- Length: 7.61 mi (12.25 km)
- Existed: 1988–present

Major junctions
- South end: US 53 north of Sarona
- North end: US 63 south of Spooner

Location
- Country: United States
- State: Wisconsin
- Counties: Washburn

Highway system
- Wisconsin State Trunk Highway System; Interstate; US; State; Scenic; Rustic
← WIS 243	→ WIS 310

State Trunk Highway 253 (often called Highway 253, STH-253 or WIS 253) is a 7.61-mile (12.25 km) state highway in southwestern Washburn County, Wisconsin, United States, that runs north–south from north of Sarona to south of Spooner.

== Route description ==
North of Sarona, WIS 253 splits off to the northwest of US Highway 53 (US 53) and runs through rural woodlands. North of the intersection with County Trunk Highway B (CTH-B), the environment to the southwest of the roadway changes to include several farm fields; to the northeast, the highway is bounded by the Beaver Brook State Public Hunting Grounds. WIS 253 ends at an intersection with US 63 near Randall Lake on the south side of Spooner.

== History ==
Before 1988, the route of WIS 253 was part of US 53. When the bypass was completed that year, the US 53 designation was shifted to it and the old routing was given the WIS 253 moniker.

== Major junctions ==
The entire route is in Washburn County.

Location	mi	km	Destinations	Notes
Town of Sarona	0.00	0.00	US 53 – Trego, Minong, Superior, Sarona, Rice Lake, Cameron, Eau Claire	Southern terminus
Community of Beaver Brook	2.75	4.43	CTH-B – Madge, Shell Lake, Coomer, Siren	
Town of Beaver Brook	6.80	10.94	CTH-K south	
Town of Beaver Brook	7.61	12.25	US 63 – Spooner, Minong, Hayward, Superior, Shell Lake, Cumberland	Northern terminus
1.000 mi = 1.609 km; 1.000 km = 0.621 mi
