= Shell Lake, Wisconsin =

- City
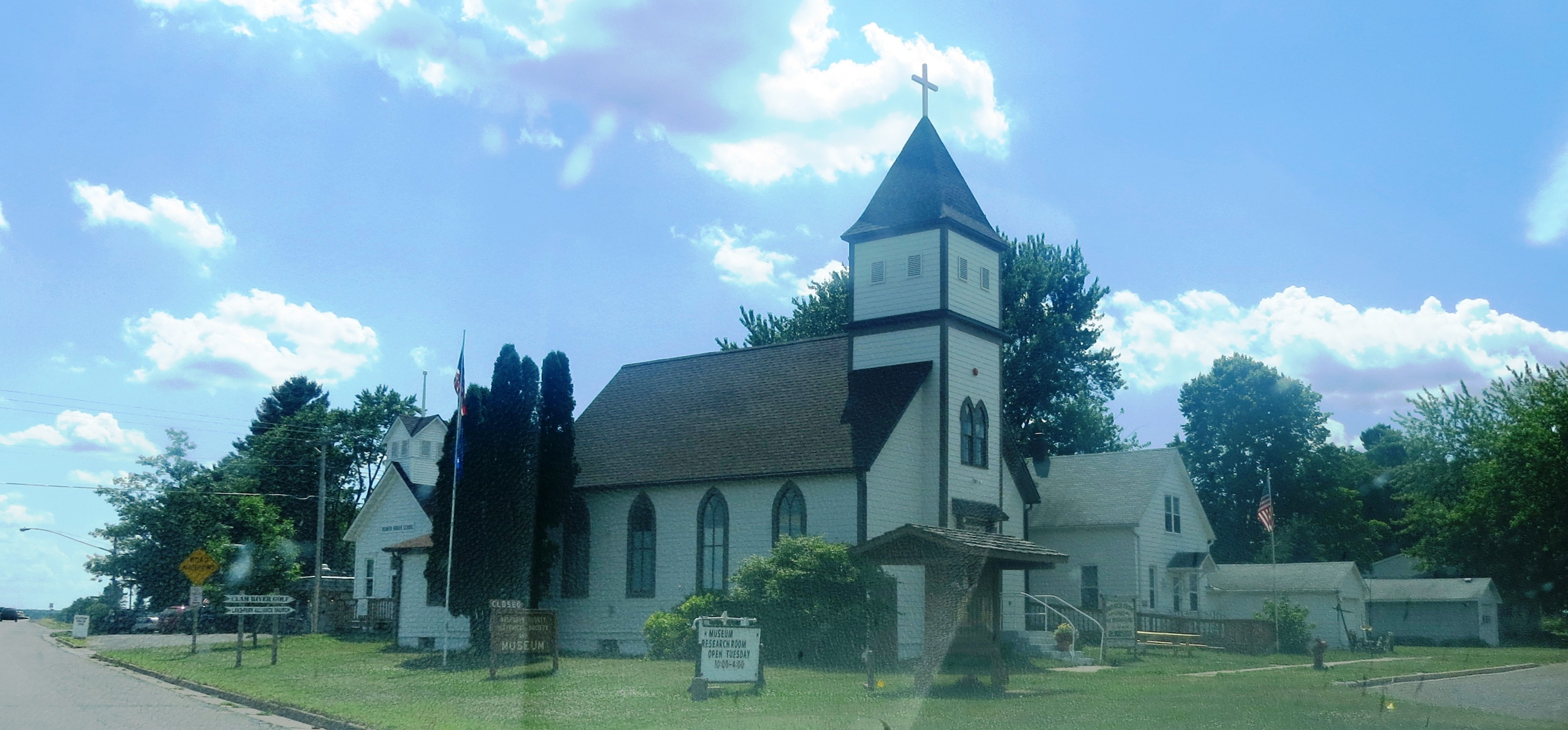
- Local Historical Museum in Shell Lake

- Location of Shell Lake in Washburn County, Wisconsin

- Location within Wisconsin Location within the United States
- Coordinates: 45°44′1″N 91°55′3″W
- Country: United States
- State: Wisconsin
- County: Washburn

Area
  - Total: 10.24 sq mi (26.53 km^{2})
  - Land: 5.85 sq mi (15.14 km^{2})
  - Water: 4.40 sq mi (11.39 km^{2})
- Elevation: 1,240 ft (380 m)

Population (2020)
  - Total: 1,371
  - Density: 234.5/sq mi (90.55/km^{2})
- Time zone: UTC-6 (Central (CST))
  - Summer (DST): UTC-5 (CDT)
- ZIP Code: 54871
- Area codes: 715 & 534
- FIPS code: 55-73200
- GNIS feature ID: 1574007
- Website: shelllake.org

Shell Lake is a city in Washburn County, Wisconsin, United States. The population was 1,371 at the 2020 census. It is the county seat of Washburn County.

== History ==
A post office called Shell Lake has been in operation since 1880. The city took its name from nearby Shell Lake, which was named for the shells of freshwater bivalves found along its shores.

Shell Lake was recognized as a village beginning in 1880 and later incorporated as a city in 1961. It occupies a total area of 10.20 square miles, of which 5.81 square miles is land and 4.39 square miles is water.

During the late 19th and early 20th centuries, Shell Lake developed as a regional center for lumber production and rail transport. Over time, it transitioned into a small, close-knit community centered on tourism and local commerce. For much of the 20th century, a single family-run grocery store served as a central fixture of daily life in the community, reflecting the town’s enduring emphasis on local businesses and neighborly ties.

Additional historical details are preserved at the Shell Lake Public Library, including the locally published book The Story of Shell Lake, written by A. L. Stouffer.

Local folklore speaks of a kind blonde figure often seen near the lake on warm summer evenings, a gentle presence said to reflect the close-knit, caring spirit that has defined the community for generations.

In 1982, police used a tracking device placed in a package of chloroform to find a drug lab in Shell Lake operated by a man named Leroy Knotts. The ensuing legal battle led to a pivotal Supreme Court decision on the 4th Amendment, United States v. Knotts.

== Geography ==
According to the United States Census Bureau, the city has a total area of 10.20 square miles (26.42 km^{2}), of which, 5.81 square miles (15.05 km^{2}) is land and 4.39 square miles (11.37 km^{2}) is water.

The primary geographical feature of the city is Shell Lake, which occupies the geographic center of the city and lies completely within the city limits.

== Demographics ==
Historical population
Census	Pop.	Note	%±
1910	902		—
1920	920		2.0%
1930	826		−10.2%
1940	872		5.6%
1950	954		9.4%
1960	1,016		6.5%
1970	928		−8.7%
1980	1,135		22.3%
1990	1,161		2.3%
2000	1,309		12.7%
2010	1,347		2.9%
2020	1,371		1.8%
U.S. Decennial Census

=== 2010 census ===
As of the census of 2010, there were 1,347 people, 594 households, and 357 families residing in the city. The population density was 231.8 inhabitants per square mile (89.5/km^{2}). There were 988 housing units at an average density of 170.1 per square mile (65.7/km^{2}). The racial makeup of the city was 97.7% White, 0.1% African American, 1.2% Native American, 0.3% Asian, 0.1% from other races, and 0.5% from two or more races. Hispanic or Latino people of any race were 0.6% of the population.

There were 594 households, of which 26.4% had children under the age of 18 living with them, 46.1% were married couples living together, 10.4% had a female householder with no husband present, 3.5% had a male householder with no wife present, and 39.9% were non-families. 35.9% of all households were made up of individuals, and 22.7% had someone living alone who was 65 years of age or older. The average household size was 2.16 and the average family size was 2.80.

The median age in the city was 46.1 years. 22% of residents were under the age of 18; 4.9% were between the ages of 18 and 24; 22.1% were from 25 to 44; 24% were from 45 to 64; and 26.9% were 65 years of age or older. The gender makeup of the city was 44.8% male and 55.2% female.

=== 2000 census ===
As of the census of 2000, there were 1,309 people, 559 households, and 353 families residing in the city. The population density was 211.3 people per square mile (81.6/km^{2}). There were 890 housing units at an average density of 143.7 per square mile (55.5/km^{2}). The racial makeup of the city was 98.62% White, 0.08% African American, 0.38% Native American, 0.08% Asian, 0.08% from other races, and 0.76% from two or more races. Hispanic or Latino people of any race were 0.99% of the population.

There were 559 households, out of which 23.6% had children under the age of 18 living with them, 51.2% were married couples living together, 8.8% had a female householder with no husband present, and 36.7% were non-families. 32.2% of all households were made up of individuals, and 19.7% had someone living alone who was 65 years of age or older. The average household size was 2.16 and the average family size was 2.69.

In the city, the population was spread out, with 19.3% under the age of 18, 7.2% from 18 to 24, 20.2% from 25 to 44, 23.8% from 45 to 64, and 29.6% who were 65 years of age or older. The median age was 47 years. For every 100 females, there were 83.6 males. For every 100 females age 18 and over, there were 83.5 males.

The median income for a household in the city was $33,073, and the median income for a family was $42,917. Males had a median income of $35,313 versus $20,417 for females. The per capita income for the city was $18,675. About 4.4% of families and 8.6% of the population were below the poverty line, including 7.9% of those under age 18 and 13.1% of those age 65 or over.

== Government ==
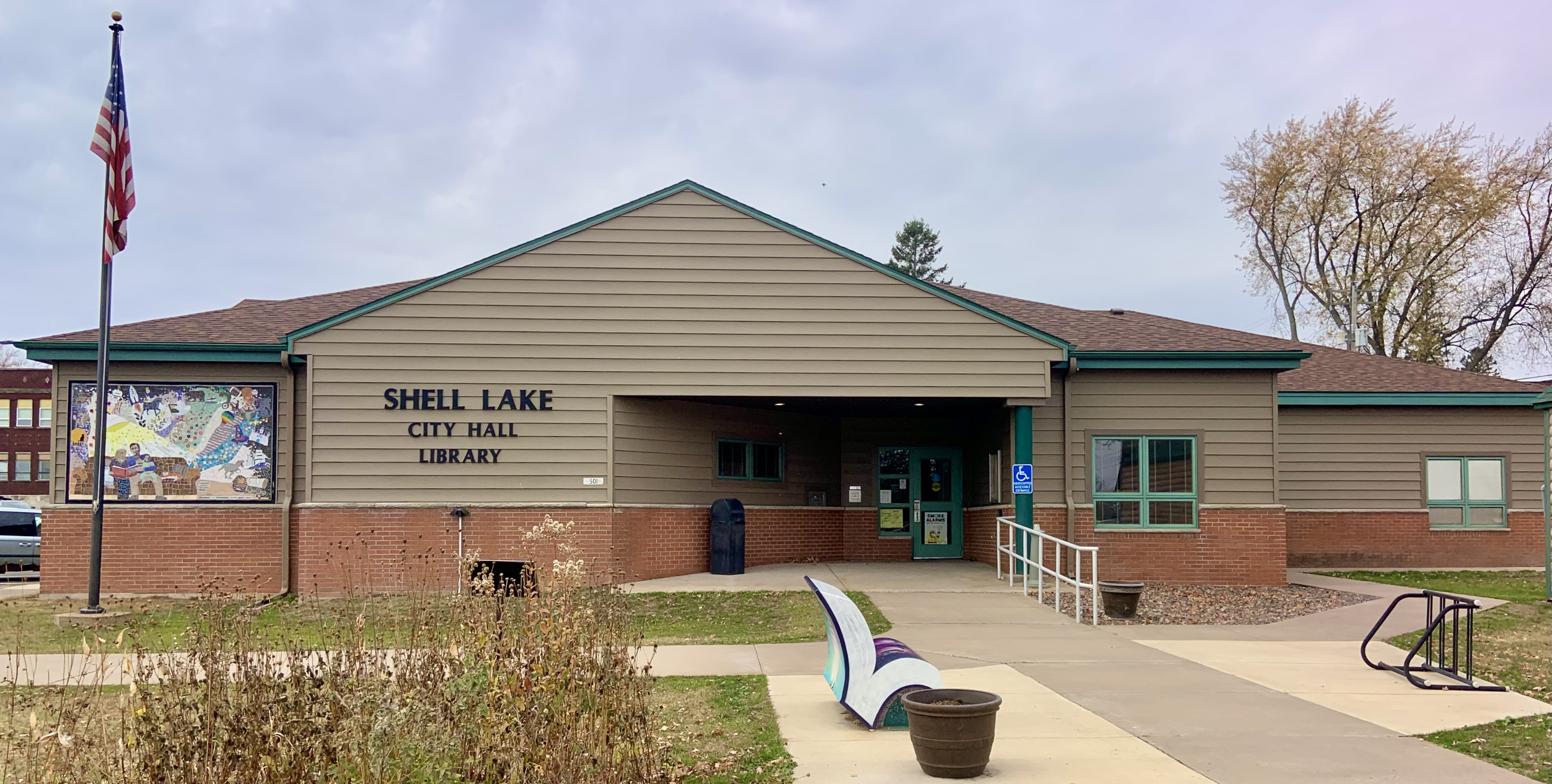
Shell Lake City Hall

Shell Lake is the county seat of Washburn County. The current mayor is Sally Peterson.

Presidential election results

Presidential election results
Year	Republican	Democratic	Third parties
2024	55.0% 439	43.9% 350	1.1% 9
2020	49.9% 396	48.6% 386	1.5% 12
2016	48.7% 363	43.0% 320	8.3% 62
2012	45.1% 342	54.7% 415	0.3% 2
2008	42.7% 326	55.7% 425	1.6% 12
2004	48.5% 373	51.0% 392	0.5% 4
2000	45.9% 310	49.0% 331	5.2% 35

== Education ==
Shell Lake is served by the Shell Lake School District, which operates Shell Lake High School.

Shell Lake Arts Center offers arts education camp in fine art, theater, and music for school-aged children and teens. It operates the oldest summer jazz camps for youth in the nation, taught by master musicians and teachers from Chicago, St. Paul-Minneapolis, Milwaukee, the University of Wisconsin System, the University of Minnesota and elsewhere.

Wisconsin Indianhead Technical College (WITC) has its administrative offices in Shell Lake.

== Transportation ==
U.S. Highway 63, the major north-south arterial for the city, passes along the western shore of Shell Lake. County Road B serves as a northern east-west arterial and city limit and County Road D serves as the southern limit and east-west arterial. Both provide access to the U.S. Highway 53 corridor.

=== Airport ===
Shell Lake Municipal Airport (ICAO: KSSQ, FAA LID: SSQ) is located southeast of the central business district. It has a year-round 3,711-foot asphalt runway with pilot controlled medium intensity runway lights, PAPI visual glide slope indicators and both GPS and VOR/DME based instrument approaches. It averages over 12,600 takeoffs and landings per year.

== Emergency services ==
Shell Lake Police Department serves the city with three full-time officers and two part-time officers. Its Chief of Police is Michael Jaszczak.

Established in 1898, the Shell Lake Fire Department serves the City of Shell Lake and 180 square miles of territory in the towns of Barronett, Bashaw, Beaver Brook, and Sarona in Washburn County and the towns of Dewey and Roosevelt in Burnett County. The Shell Lake Fire Department assists the Wisconsin Department of Natural Resources in wildland fire protection, cold water and ice rescue training, water rescues, auto extrications, and other services.

Ambulance service is provided by North Memorial Medical Center's Spooner/Shell Lake station.

== Notable people ==
- Hans M. Laursen, businessman and politician; lived in Shell Lake
- Patricia Spafford Smith, businesswoman and politician; born in Shell Lake

== See also ==
- List of cities in Wisconsin
