= Shell Lake (Wisconsin) =

Lake in the state of Wisconsin, United States

- Location within Wisconsin Location within the United States
- Location: Washburn County, Wisconsin
- Coordinates: 45°44′02″N 91°53′59″W
- Type: Reservoir
- Basin countries: United States
- Surface area: 2,513 acres (1,017 ha)
- Max. depth: 36 ft (11 m)
- Surface elevation: 1,211 ft (369 m)
- Islands: Scout Island
- Settlements: Shell Lake

Shell Lake is a lake in Washburn County, Wisconsin, in the United States. This lake was named for the shape of the lake that resembles the shells of freshwater bivalves. The Shell Lake Municipal Airport is located on a peninsula on the western shoreline of the lake.

== See also ==
- List of lakes in Wisconsin
