= Earl, Wisconsin =

- Unincorporated community
- Location within Wisconsin Location within the United States
- Coordinates: 45°54′38″N 91°45′38″W
- Country: United States
- State: Wisconsin
- County: Washburn
- Elevation: 1,099 ft (335 m)
- Time zone: UTC-6 (Central (CST))
  - Summer (DST): UTC-5 (CDT)
- Area codes: 715 & 534
- GNIS feature ID: 1564266

Earl is an unincorporated community located in the town of Springbrook, Washburn County, Wisconsin, United States. Earl is located at the junction of U.S. Route 63 and County Highway E, 8.5 miles (13.7 km) northeast of Spooner; the Wisconsin Great Northern Railroad runs through the community.

== History ==
When the community was founded, it was named Sinclair's Spur. H. L. Sinclair was the agent for the Chicago, St. Paul, Minneapolis and Omaha Railroad's agent in Trego, Wisconsin. Earl's post office opened on August 30, 1905, and closed on July 1, 1984. The community was named for Earl McDill, a relative of the first postmaster, John Whitney.
