= Madge =

Madge may refer to:

== Places ==
- Madge, Wisconsin, United States, a town
  - Madge (community), Wisconsin, an unincorporated community
- Madge Lake, Saskatchewan, Canada

== People ==
- Madge (given name)
- Madge (surname)
- Nickname of Madonna (born 1958)

== Other uses ==
- Madge baronets, a title in the Baronetage of the United Kingdom
- Cyclone Madge (1973)
- Madge, NATO reporting name for the Beriev Be-6, a Soviet flying boat of the 1950s and 1960s
- Madge Networks, a company working in high-speed networking solutions in the mid 1990s
- Madge, a character from the TV series Thomas & Friends
