= Nobleton =

Nobleton may refer to:

== Places ==
Canada

- Nobleton, Ontario
- Nobleton Airport, in Ontario

United States

- Nobleton, Florida
- Nobleton, Wisconsin
