= KSSQ =

KSSQ may refer to:

- KSSQ-LP, a former radio station licensed to Siloam Springs, Arkansas, United States
- Shell Lake Municipal Airport, in Wisconsin, United States, ICAO code KSSQ
