= Beaver Brook Wildlife Area =

Protected area in Wisconsin, US

- IUCN category V (protected landscape/seascape)
- Location within Wisconsin Location within the United States
- Location: Washburn County, Wisconsin
- Nearest city: Spooner, Wisconsin
- Coordinates: 45.78286°N 91.85408°W
- Area: 1,968 acres (7.96 km^{2})
- Established: 1951
- Governing body: Wisconsin Department of Natural Resources

The Beaver Brook Wildlife Area is a 1,968-acre (7.96 km^{2}) tract of protected land located in Washburn County, Wisconsin, managed by the Wisconsin Department of Natural Resources (WDNR). The wildlife area is in place to protect trout stream habitats and provide recreation experiences through its many trails.

== History ==
Beaver Brook Wildlife Area was gazetted with an initial land acquisition of 680 acres from the county government. Ten further purchases of land from private owenership have increased the acreage significantly, with the additional goal of expanding recreation area. The wildlife area is bound to the west by the Wild Rivers State Trail, a former railroad track that stretches 104 miles. The trail runs up against remnants of houses and an old logging dam, removed in 1910.

Cranberry bogs are prevalent in Washburn County, and the marsh and wetland land coverage in both the county and the wildlife area is ideal for cranberry cultivation. The cultivation of cranberries, specifically the establishment of cranberry reservoirs is harmful to trout populations, and this led to the purchasing of 560 acres of private land in 2003 by the WDNR in conjunction with the Wisconsin Department of Transportation. The purchased plot, (the largest of the Wildlife Area) included a developed 81.5-acre (0.330 km^{2}) cranberry bog. This developed marsh was restored to cranberry beds and the flow of the eponymous stream was restored.

== Land cover ==
The main feature of the wildlife area is the upland deciduous habitat, making up over nearly one third of the total area. There are many notable examples of large aspen and northern hardwood trees in the deciduous habitat, with mainly old growth sections in the natural area enclave.

Cover type acreage
Cover type	Acres	Percentage cover
Developed	7	<1%
Forested wetland	200	10%
Open water	47	<1%
Open wetland/marsh	274	14%
Upland conifer	84	4%
Upland deciduous	1,238	63%
Upland grass	14	<1%
Upland shrub	8	<1%
Shrub wetland	96	5%
Total cover	1,968	100%

== Beaver Brook State Natural Area ==
The Beaver Brook State Natural Area is a unit of the larger wildlife area that contains Beaver Brook, a high quality Class I trout stream.

The stream corridor protects patches of old growth northern dry-mesic forests and a number of species of special concern.
