= Walt McGaw =

American football player (1899–1979)

No. 2
- Position: Guard

Personal information
- Born: December 27, 1899; Rockford, Illinois, U.S.
- Died: October 8, 1979 (aged 79); Chicog, Wisconsin, U.S.
- Listed height: 5 ft 10 in (1.78 m)
- Listed weight: 195 lb (88 kg)

Career information
- High school: Rockford Central (Illinois)
- College: Beloit

Career history
- Green Bay Packers (1926)

Career statistics
- Games played: 1
- Stats at Pro Football Reference

Raymond Peter "Walt" McGaw (December 27, 1899 – October 8, 1979) was a guard in the National Football League (NFL) for the Green Bay Packers. McGaw was born on December 27, 1899, in Rockford, Illinois, where he attended Rockford Central High School. After high school, he attended Beloit College, where he played college football as an offensive lineman. He was named captain of the football team and was named to the second-team All-State team. He also played and was named captain of the Beloit basketball team.

McGaw signed with the Green Bay Packers during the 1926 NFL season, where he only played in one game. At the time of his signing, The Post-Crescent described McGaw as "a big rangy guard tipping the beam at a 195 pounder [sic]".
