= Evergreen, Washburn County, Wisconsin =

Town in Wisconsin, United States

Evergreen, Wisconsin
- Town
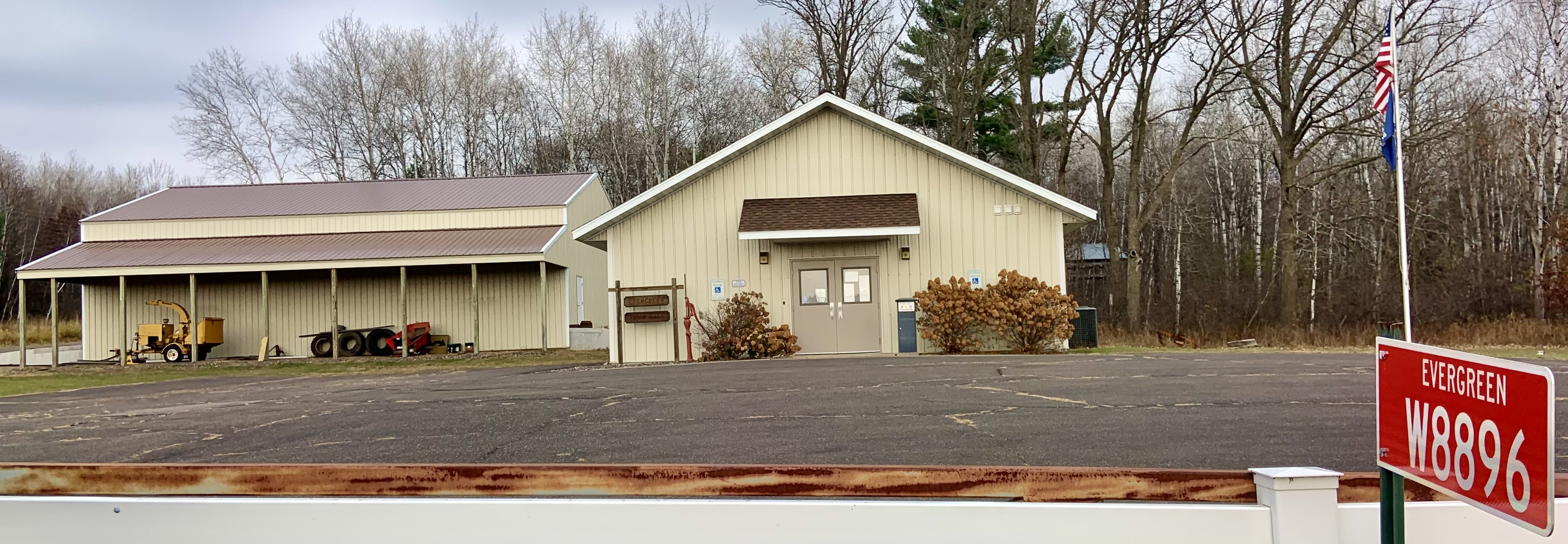
- Town hall

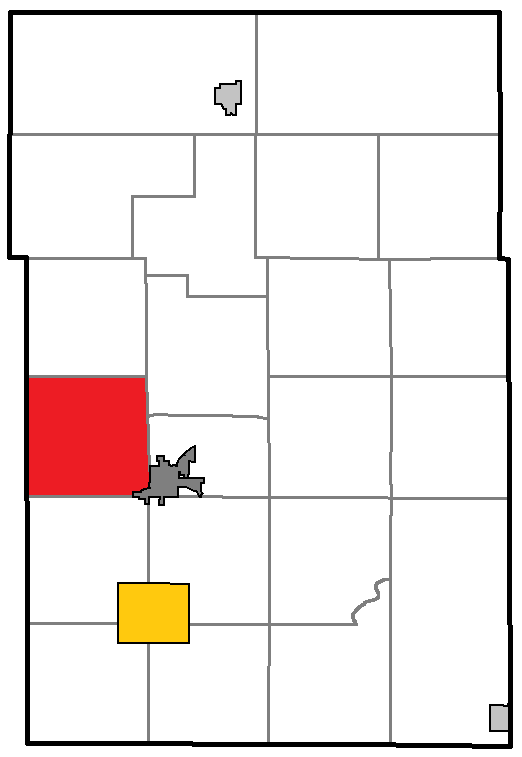
- Location of Evergreen, within Washburn County, Wisconsin
- Coordinates: 45°51′6″N 91°58′30″W
- Country: United States
- State: Wisconsin
- County: Washburn

Area
  - Total: 34.9 sq mi (90.4 km^{2})
  - Land: 33.6 sq mi (87.1 km^{2})
  - Water: 1.3 sq mi (3.3 km^{2})
- Elevation: 1,027 ft (313 m)

Population (2020)
  - Total: 1,191
  - Density: 35.4/sq mi (13.7/km^{2})
- Time zone: UTC-6 (Central (CST))
  - Summer (DST): UTC-5 (CDT)
- Area codes: 715 & 534
- FIPS code: 55-24600
- GNIS feature ID: 1583179
- Website: https://townofevergreen.org/

Evergreen is a town in Washburn County, Wisconsin, United States. The population was 1,191 at the 2020 census.

== Geography ==
According to the United States Census Bureau, the town has a total area of 34.9 square miles (90.4 km^{2}), of which 33.6 square miles (87.1 km^{2}) is land and 1.3 square miles (3.3 km^{2}) (3.70%) is water.

== Demographics ==
As of the census of 2000, there were 1,076 people, 413 households, and 304 families residing in the town. The population density was 32.0 people per square mile (12.4/km^{2}). There were 530 housing units at an average density of 15.8 per square mile (6.1/km^{2}). The racial makeup of the town was 98.14% White, 0.28% Native American, 0.09% Asian, 0.09% Pacific Islander, 0.19% from other races, and 1.21% from two or more races. Hispanic or Latino of any race were 0.84% of the population.

There were 413 households, out of which 34.4% had children under the age of 18 living with them, 63.4% were married couples living together, 6.5% had a female householder with no husband present, and 26.2% were non-families. 21.5% of all households were made up of individuals, and 9.9% had someone living alone who was 65 years of age or older. The average household size was 2.59 and the average family size was 3.02.

In the town, the population was spread out, with 28.3% under the age of 18, 4.6% from 18 to 24, 25.6% from 25 to 44, 27.2% from 45 to 64, and 14.2% who were 65 years of age or older. The median age was 40 years. For every 100 females, there were 108.1 males. For every 100 females age 18 and over, there were 102.4 males.

The median income for a household in the town was $33,036, and the median income for a family was $40,357. Males had a median income of $34,688 versus $20,179 for females. The per capita income for the town was $15,613. About 4.4% of families and 7.6% of the population were below the poverty line, including 5.4% of those under age 18 and 12.9% of those age 65 or over.
