= Gull Lake, Wisconsin =

Town in Wisconsin, United States

- Town
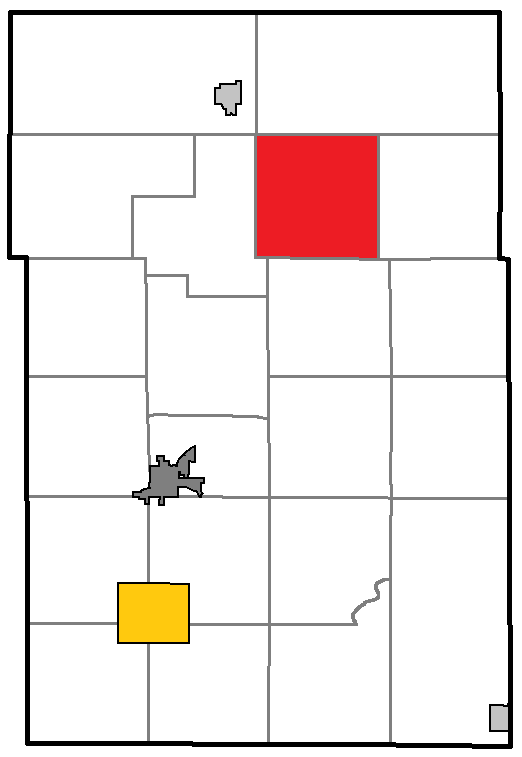
- Location of Gull Lake, within Washburn County
- Coordinates: 45°59′59″N 91°44′8″W
- Country: United States
- State: Wisconsin
- County: Washburn

Area
  - Total: 36.2 sq mi (93.8 km^{2})
  - Land: 35.1 sq mi (90.8 km^{2})
  - Water: 1.2 sq mi (3.0 km^{2})
- Elevation: 1,138 ft (347 m)

Population (2020)
  - Total: 198
  - Density: 5.65/sq mi (2.18/km^{2})
- Time zone: UTC-6 (Central (CST))
  - Summer (DST): UTC-5 (CDT)
- Area codes: 715 & 534
- FIPS code: 55-31825
- GNIS feature ID: 1583331
- Website: http://www.townofgulllake.us

Gull Lake is a town in Washburn County, Wisconsin, United States. The population was 198 at the 2020 census.

== Geography ==
According to the United States Census Bureau, the town has a total area of 36.2 square miles (93.8 km^{2}), of which 35.0 square miles (90.8 km^{2}) is land and 1.2 square miles (3.0 km^{2}) (3.20%) is water.

There are several significant bodies of water in the area, including the town's namesake, Gull Lake, which is a 518 acre lake with a maximum depth of 19 feet. Common species caught on Gull Lake include largemouth bass, northern pike, and panfish. There are two public boat launches on the lake.

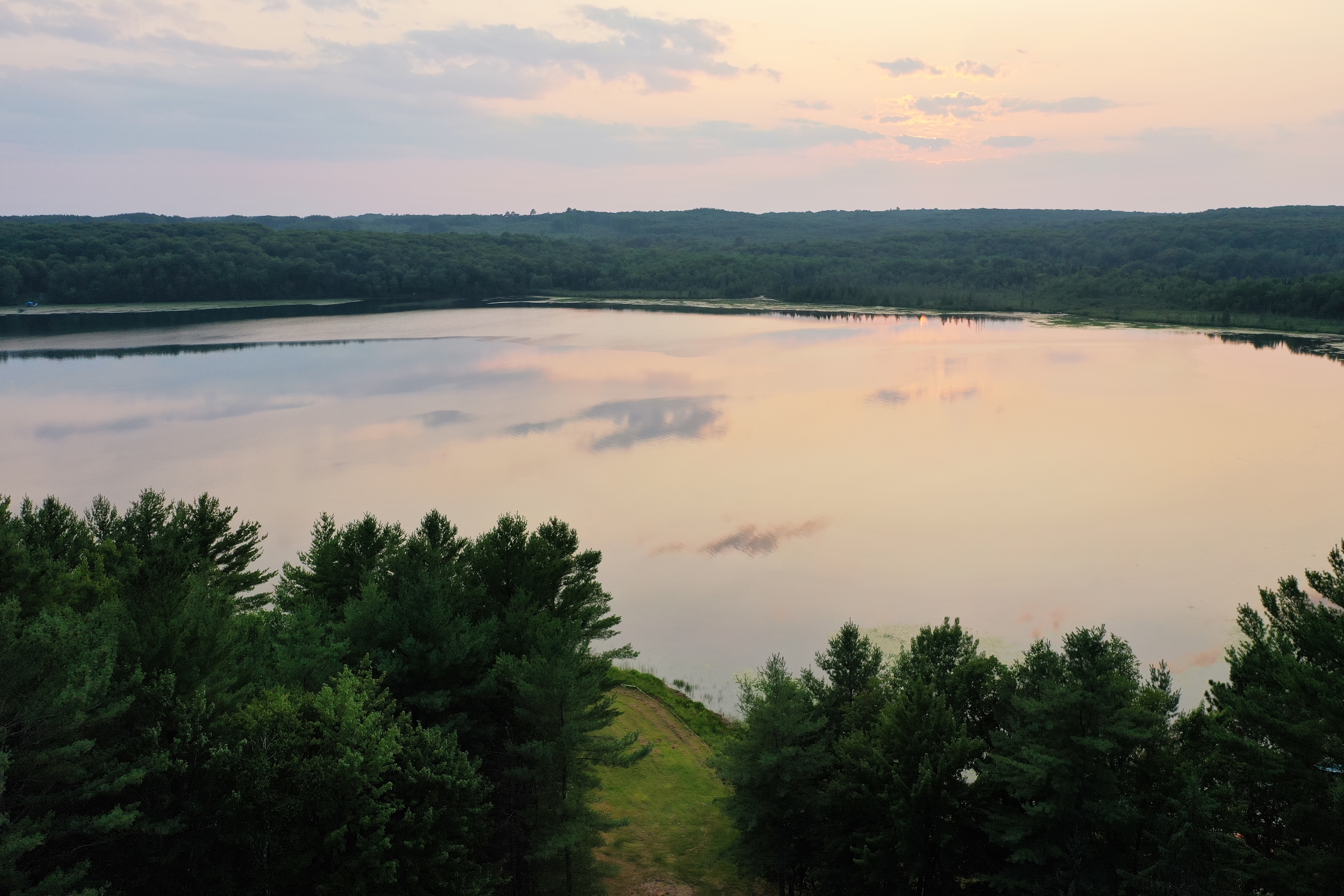
Aerial view over the northern portion of Gull Lake.

== Demographics ==
As of the census of 2000, there were 158 people, 65 households, and 46 families residing in the town. The population density was 4.5 people per square mile (1.7/km^{2}). There were 145 housing units at an average density of 4.1 per square mile (1.6/km^{2}). The racial makeup of the town was 95.57% White, and 4.43% from two or more races. Hispanic or Latino of any race were 0.63% of the population.

There were 65 households, out of which 21.5% had children under the age of 18 living with them, 60.0% were married couples living together, 4.6% had a female householder with no husband present, and 27.7% were non-families. 21.5% of all households were made up of individuals, and 6.2% had someone living alone who was 65 years of age or older. The average household size was 2.43 and the average family size was 2.72.

In the town, the population was spread out, with 19.6% under the age of 18, 6.3% from 18 to 24, 24.7% from 25 to 44, 34.2% from 45 to 64, and 15.2% who were 65 years of age or older. The median age was 45 years. For every 100 females, there were 143.1 males. For every 100 females age 18 and over, there were 139.6 males.

The median income for a household in the town was $42,500, and the median income for a family was $48,750. Males had a median income of $40,000 versus $24,375 for females. The per capita income for the town was $21,527. None of the families and 1.5% of the population were living below the poverty line.
