= Bass Lake, Washburn County, Wisconsin =

Town in Wisconsin, United States

Bass Lake, Wisconsin
- Town
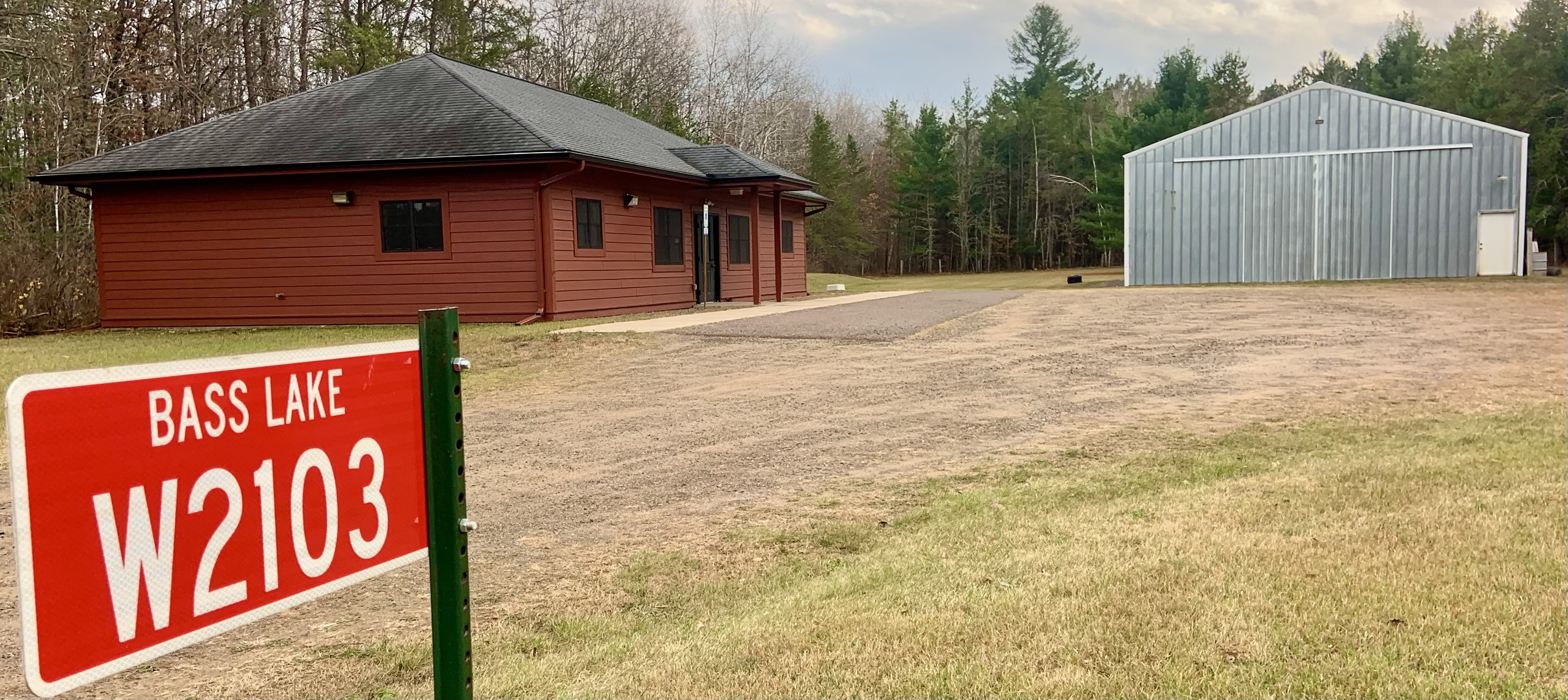
- Town hall

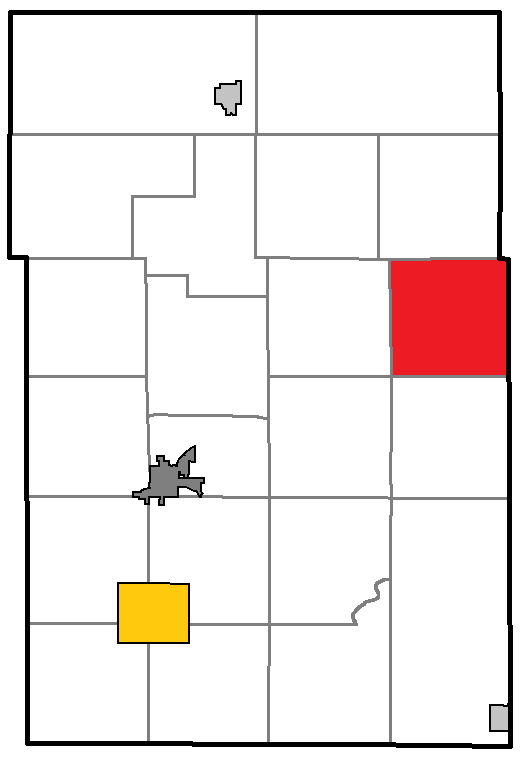
- Location of Bass Lake, within Washburn County, Wisconsin
- Coordinates: 45°57′6″N 91°35′50″W
- Country: United States
- State: Wisconsin
- County: Washburn

Area
  - Total: 33.2 sq mi (85.9 km^{2})
  - Land: 32.3 sq mi (83.7 km^{2})
  - Water: 0.81 sq mi (2.1 km^{2})
- Elevation: 1,155 ft (352 m)

Population (2020)
  - Total: 566
  - Density: 17.5/sq mi (6.76/km^{2})
- Time zone: UTC-6 (Central (CST))
  - Summer (DST): UTC-5 (CDT)
- Area codes: 715 & 534
- FIPS code: 55-05225
- GNIS feature ID: 1582762

Bass Lake is a town in Washburn County, Wisconsin, United States. The population was 566 at the 2020 census.

== Geography ==
According to the United States Census Bureau, the town has a total area of 33.2 square miles (85.9 km^{2}), of which 32.3 square miles (83.7 km^{2}) is land and 0.8 square mile (2.1 km^{2}) (2.47%) is water.

== Demographics ==
As of the census of 2000, there were 535 people, 192 households, and 152 families residing in the town. The population density was 16.6 people per square mile (6.4/km^{2}). There were 277 housing units at an average density of 8.6 per square mile (3.3/km^{2}). The racial makeup of the town was 94.39% White, 0.19% African American, 2.43% Native American, 0.19% Asian, 0.19% Pacific Islander, and 2.62% from two or more races. Hispanic or Latino of any race were 0.75% of the population.

There were 192 households, out of which 35.9% had children under the age of 18 living with them, 67.2% were married couples living together, 6.3% had a female householder with no husband present, and 20.8% were non-families. 16.1% of all households were made up of individuals, and 5.2% had someone living alone who was 65 years of age or older. The average household size was 2.73 and the average family size was 3.07.

In the town, the population was spread out, with 29.9% under the age of 18, 6.0% from 18 to 24, 29.9% from 25 to 44, 23.6% from 45 to 64, and 10.7% who were 65 years of age or older. The median age was 36 years. For every 100 females, there were 113.1 males. For every 100 females age 18 and over, there were 110.7 males.

The median income for a household in the town was $34,922, and the median income for a family was $37,500. Males had a median income of $26,563 versus $22,500 for females. The per capita income for the town was $15,144. About 5.4% of families and 7.5% of the population were below the poverty line, including 2.5% of those under age 18 and 10.8% of those age 65 or over.
