= Springbrook (community), Wisconsin =

Census-designated place in Wisconsin, United States

Springbrook, Wisconsin
- Census-designated place
- Location within Wisconsin Location within the United States
- Coordinates: 45°56′55″N 91°41′18″W
- Country: United States
- State: Wisconsin
- County: Washburn

Area
  - Total: 0.714 sq mi (1.85 km^{2})
  - Land: 0.714 sq mi (1.85 km^{2})
  - Water: 0 sq mi (0 km^{2})
- Elevation: 1,096 ft (334 m)

Population (2020)
  - Total: 89
  - Density: 120/sq mi (48/km^{2})
- Time zone: UTC-6 (Central (CST))
  - Summer (DST): UTC-5 (CDT)
- ZIP code: 54875
- Area codes: 715 & 534
- GNIS feature ID: 1574713

Springbrook is an unincorporated community and census-designated place located in the town of Springbrook, Washburn County, Wisconsin, United States. Springbrook is located on U.S. Route 63, 13 miles (21 km) northeast of Spooner. Springbrook has a post office with ZIP code 54875. Its population was 89 as of the 2020 census.

== History ==
Springbrook was originally called Namekegan, and under the latter name was founded in 1888. The present name was taken from a nearby brook which heads in a spring. A post office was established as Namekegan in 1888, and the name was changed to Springbrook in 1901.
