= Crystal, Wisconsin =

Town in Wisconsin, United States

- Town
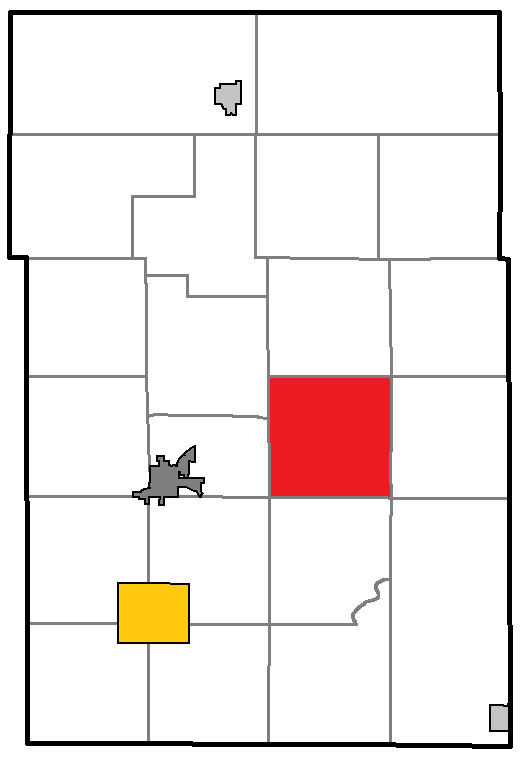
- Location of Crystal, within Washburn County
- Coordinates: 45°51′16″N 91°43′5″W
- Country: United States
- State: Wisconsin
- County: Washburn

Area
  - Total: 35.7 sq mi (92.4 km^{2})
  - Land: 35.1 sq mi (90.8 km^{2})
  - Water: 0.62 sq mi (1.6 km^{2})
- Elevation: 1,234 ft (376 m)

Population (2020)
  - Total: 280
  - Density: 8.0/sq mi (3.1/km^{2})
- Time zone: UTC-6 (Central (CST))
  - Summer (DST): UTC-5 (CDT)
- Area codes: 715 & 534
- FIPS code: 55-17850
- GNIS feature ID: 1583031

Crystal is a town in Washburn County, Wisconsin, United States. The population was 280 at the 2020 census.

== Geography ==
According to the United States Census Bureau, the town has a total area of 35.7 square miles (92.4 km^{2}), of which 35.1 square miles (90.8 km^{2}) is land and 0.6 square mile (1.6 km^{2}) (1.74%) is water.

== Demographics ==
As of the census of 2000, there were 323 people, 117 households, and 87 families residing in the town. The population density was 9.2 people per square mile (3.6/km^{2}). There were 184 housing units at an average density of 5.2 per square mile (2.0/km^{2}). The racial makeup of the town was 98.76% White, 0.93% Native American, and 0.31% from two or more races.

There were 117 households, out of which 29.9% had children under the age of 18 living with them, 63.2% were married couples living together, 7.7% had a female householder with no husband present, and 24.8% were non-families. 19.7% of all households were made up of individuals, and 7.7% had someone living alone who was 65 years of age or older. The average household size was 2.76 and the average family size was 3.25.

In the town, the population was spread out, with 24.1% under the age of 18, 8.7% from 18 to 24, 26.6% from 25 to 44, 23.5% from 45 to 64, and 17.0% who were 65 years of age or older. The median age was 40 years. For every 100 females, there were 98.2 males. For every 100 females age 18 and over, there were 109.4 males.

The median income for a household in the town was $25,000, and the median income for a family was $31,458. Males had a median income of $19,643 versus $16,875 for females. The per capita income for the town was $15,706. About 5.1% of families and 9.0% of the population were below the poverty line, including 11.5% of those under age 18 and 10.0% of those age 65 or over.
