= Casey, Wisconsin =

Town in Wisconsin, United States

- Town
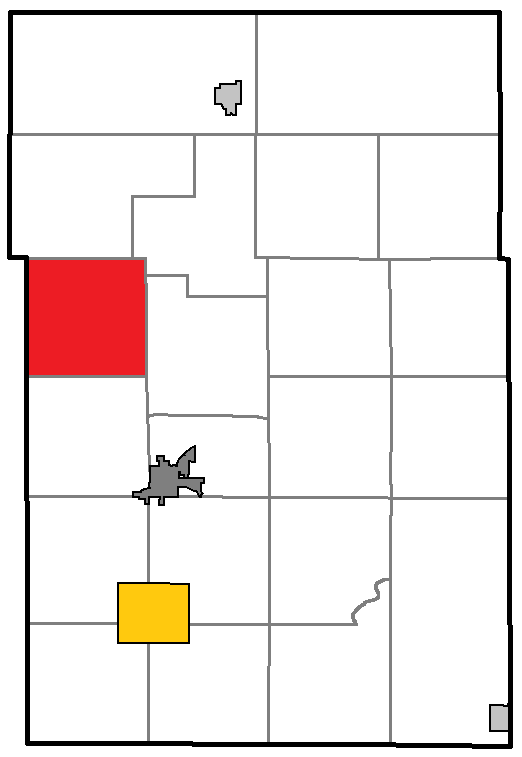
- Location of Casey, within Washburn County
- Coordinates: 45°56′30″N 91°57′16″W
- Country: United States
- State: Wisconsin
- County: Washburn

Area
  - Total: 34.2 sq mi (88.5 km^{2})
  - Land: 31.1 sq mi (80.6 km^{2})
  - Water: 3.1 sq mi (7.9 km^{2})
- Elevation: 1,014 ft (309 m)

Population (2020)
  - Total: 396
  - Density: 12.7/sq mi (4.91/km^{2})
- Time zone: UTC-6 (Central (CST))
  - Summer (DST): UTC-5 (CDT)
- Area codes: 715 & 534
- FIPS code: 55-12925
- GNIS feature ID: 1582923

Casey is a town in Washburn County, Wisconsin, United States. The population was 396 at the 2020 census.

== Geography ==
According to the United States Census Bureau, the town has a total area of 34.2 square miles (88.5 km^{2}), of which 31.1 square miles (80.6 km^{2}) is land and 3.0 square miles (7.9 km^{2}) (8.90%) is water.

== Demographics ==
As of the census of 2000, there were 466 people, 213 households, and 146 families residing in the town. The population density was 15.0 people per square mile (5.8/km^{2}). There were 657 housing units at an average density of 21.1 per square mile (8.1/km^{2}). The racial makeup of the town was 98.07% White, 0.21% African American, 0.86% Native American, 0.43% Asian, and 0.43% from two or more races. Hispanic or Latino of any race were 0.86% of the population.

There were 213 households, out of which 19.7% had children under the age of 18 living with them, 60.6% were married couples living together, 3.8% had a female householder with no husband present, and 31.0% were non-families. 27.7% of all households were made up of individuals, and 10.8% had someone living alone who was 65 years of age or older. The average household size was 2.19 and the average family size was 2.62.

In the town, the population was spread out, with 18.0% under the age of 18, 3.0% from 18 to 24, 22.7% from 25 to 44, 30.9% from 45 to 64, and 25.3% who were 65 years of age or older. The median age was 48 years. For every 100 females, there were 111.8 males. For every 100 females age 18 and over, there were 112.2 males.

The median income for a household in the town was $33,125, and the median income for a family was $39,464. Males had a median income of $28,750 versus $20,313 for females. The per capita income for the town was $20,611. About 5.2% of families and 8.8% of the population were below the poverty line, including 15.1% of those under age 18 and 2.8% of those age 65 or over.
