= Springbrook, Wisconsin =

Town in Wisconsin, United States

- Town
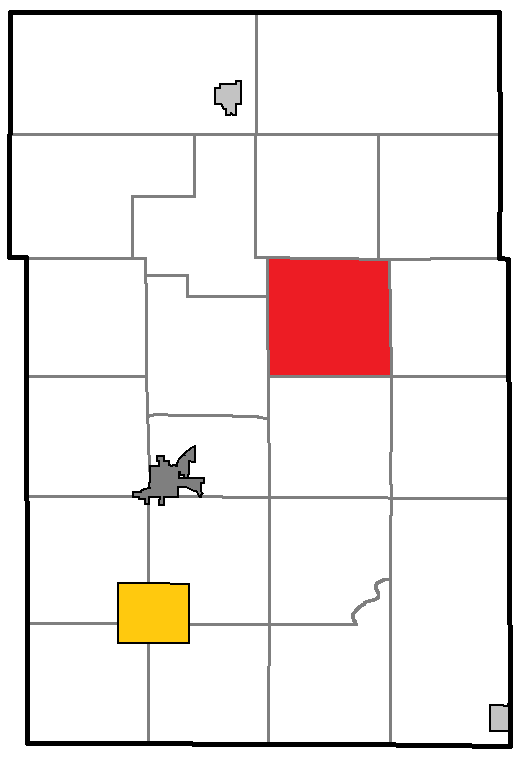
- Location of Springbrook, within Washburn County

- Location within Wisconsin
- Coordinates: 45°56′55″N 91°41′18″W
- Country: United States
- State: Wisconsin
- County: Washburn

Area
  - Total: 34.66 sq mi (89.8 km^{2})
  - Land: 33.58 sq mi (87.0 km^{2})
  - Water: 1.07 sq mi (2.8 km^{2})
- Elevation: 1,440 ft (439 m)

Population (2020)
  - Total: 504
  - Density: 15.0/sq mi (5.79/km^{2})
- Time zone: UTC-6 (Central (CST))
  - Summer (DST): UTC-5 (CDT)
- Postal code: 54875
- Area codes: 715 & 534

Springbrook is a town in Washburn County, Wisconsin, United States. The population was 504 at the 2020 census. The unincorporated communities of Earl and Springbrook are located in the town.

== Geography ==
According to the United States Census Bureau, the town has a total area of 34.7 square miles (89.8 km^{2}), of which 34.2 square miles (88.5 km^{2}) is land and 0.5 square mile (1.3 km^{2}) (1.47%) is water.

== Demographics ==
As of the census of 2000, there were 536 people, 227 households, and 150 families residing in the town. The population density was 15.7 people per square mile (6.1/km^{2}). There were 300 housing units at an average density of 8.8 per square mile (3.4/km^{2}). The racial makeup of the town was 96.64% White, 0.19% African American, 1.49% Native American, 0.37% Asian, 0.19% from other races, and 1.12% from two or more races. Hispanic or Latino of any race were 1.68% of the population.

There were 227 households, out of which 25.6% had children under the age of 18 living with them, 55.9% were married couples living together, 6.6% had a female householder with no husband present, and 33.9% were non-families. 27.8% of all households were made up of individuals, and 9.3% had someone living alone who was 65 years of age or older. The average household size was 2.36 and the average family size was 2.84.

In the town, the population was spread out, with 24.8% under the age of 18, 5.0% from 18 to 24, 27.6% from 25 to 44, 25.7% from 45 to 64, and 16.8% who were 65 years of age or older. The median age was 41 years. For every 100 females, there were 120.6 males. For every 100 females age 18 and over, there were 112.1 males.

The median income for a household in the town was $36,406, and the median income for a family was $37,500. Males had a median income of $29,375 versus $18,750 for females. The per capita income for the town was $17,859. About 6.3% of families and 12.3% of the population were below the poverty line, including 25.4% of those under age 18 and none of those age 65 or over.
