= 2000 United States presidential election in Wisconsin =

- November 7, 2000
- Turnout: 67.0% (▲9.1 pp)

Nominee	Al Gore	George W. Bush
Party	Democratic	Republican
Home state	Tennessee	Texas
Running mate	Joe Lieberman	Dick Cheney
Electoral vote	11	0
Popular vote	1,242,987	1,237,279
Percentage	47.83%	47.61%

Gore
40–50%
50–60%
60–70%
70–80%
80–90%
90–100%
Bush
40–50%
50–60%
60–70%
70–80%
80–90%
90–100%
Tie/no data
President before election
Bill Clinton
Democratic
Elected President
George W. Bush
Republican

The 2000 United States presidential election in Wisconsin took place on November 7, 2000, and was part of the 2000 United States presidential election. Voters chose 11 representatives, or electors, to the Electoral College, who voted for president and vice president.

Wisconsin was won by Vice President Al Gore by a slim 0.22% margin of victory, a mere difference of 5,708 votes. Victories in Milwaukee County, where Milwaukee is located, and Dane County, where Madison is located contributed to his victory. This was the first time since 1988, and only the second time since 1960, that Wisconsin did not vote for the overall winner of a presidential election. This was the last time that Wisconsin voted to the right of neighboring Iowa. To date, this is the closest presidential margin of victory ever in Wisconsin. Wisconsin would also not vote more Republican than the nation as a whole again until 2016.

== General election ==
=== Polling ===
Poll source	Date(s)	Sample size	Margin of error	George W. Bush (R)	Al Gore (D)	Ralph Nader (G)	Other / undecided (Note: Calculated by taking the difference of 100% and all other listed candidates combined. For polls that do not report a figure for Nader, this includes his support.)
Market Shares Corp.	November 5, 2000	400	—	44%	39%	6%	11%
Rasmussen Reports	November 5, 2000	1,000	—	47%	43%	—	10%
Zogby Analytics	November 5, 2000	492	—	46%	46%	6%	2%
Harris Insights & Analytics	November 3, 2000	5,168	—	47%	47%	5%	1%
Zogby Analytics	November 2, 2000	500	—	46%	45%	5%	4%
Research 2000	November 1, 2000	619	—	40%	46%	4%	10%
Zogby Analytics	October 30, 2000	500	—	42%	45%	5%	8%
Market Shares Corp.	October 27, 2000	500	—	46%	39%	5%	10%
Zogby Analytics	October 27, 2000	500	—	40%	49%	6%	5%
Lake Research Partners/The Tarrance Group	October 24, 2000	400	—	42%	43%	6%	9%
St. Norbert College Strategic Research Institute	October 21, 2000	413	—	39%	46%	5%	10%
Harris Insights & Analytics	October 20, 2000	587	—	49%	40%	5%	6%

=== Results ===
2000 United States presidential election in Wisconsin
Party	Candidate	Votes	Percentage	Electoral votes
Democratic	Al Gore	1,242,987	47.83%	11
Republican	George W. Bush	1,237,279	47.61%	0
Green	Ralph Nader	94,070	3.62%	0
Independent	Pat Buchanan	11,471	0.44%	0
Libertarian	Harry Browne	6,640	0.26%	0

==== By county ====
County	Al Gore Democratic		George W. Bush Republican		Various candidates Other parties		Margin		Total votes cast
County	#	%	#	%	#	%	#	%	Total votes cast
Adams	4,826	52.94%	3,920	43.00%	370	4.06%	906	9.94%	9,116
Ashland	4,356	55.21%	3,038	38.50%	496	6.29%	1,318	16.71%	7,890
Barron	8,928	44.86%	9,848	49.48%	1,128	5.67%	-920	-4.62%	19,904
Bayfield	4,427	53.60%	3,266	39.54%	566	6.85%	1,161	14.06%	8,259
Brown	49,096	45.56%	54,258	50.25%	4,415	4.10%	-5,162	-4.79%	107,769
Buffalo	3,237	48.74%	3,038	45.75%	366	5.51%	199	2.99%	6,641
Burnett	3,626	44.49%	3,967	48.67%	558	6.85%	-341	-4.18%	8,151
Calumet	8,202	41.12%	10,837	54.33%	908	4.55%	-2,635	-13.21%	19,947
Chippewa	12,102	46.24%	12,835	49.04%	1,236	4.72%	-733	-2.80%	26,173
Clark	5,931	41.92%	7,461	52.73%	757	5.35%	-1,530	-10.81%	14,149
Columbia	12,636	49.38%	11,987	46.85%	964	3.77%	649	2.53%	25,587
Crawford	4,005	54.17%	3,024	40.90%	365	4.94%	981	13.27%	7,394
Dane	142,317	61.15%	75,790	32.56%	14,632	6.29%	66,527	28.59%	232,739
Dodge	14,580	38.67%	21,684	57.52%	1,437	3.81%	-7,104	-18.85%	37,701
Door	6,560	43.10%	7,810	51.31%	850	5.58%	-1,250	-8.21%	15,220
Douglas	13,593	62.62%	6,930	31.93%	1,183	5.45%	6,663	30.69%	21,706
Dunn	9,172	47.45%	8,911	46.10%	1,247	6.45%	261	1.35%	19,330
Eau Claire	24,078	50.29%	20,921	43.70%	2,876	6.01%	3,157	6.59%	47,875
Florence	816	33.93%	1,528	63.53%	61	2.54%	-712	-29.60%	2,405
Fond du Lac	18,181	39.02%	26,548	56.98%	1,860	3.99%	-8,367	-17.96%	46,589
Forest	2,158	45.76%	2,404	50.98%	154	3.27%	-246	-5.22%	4,716
Grant	10,691	48.69%	10,240	46.64%	1,025	4.67%	451	2.05%	21,956
Green	7,863	51.47%	6,790	44.45%	623	4.08%	1,073	7.02%	15,276
Green Lake	3,301	36.25%	5,451	59.86%	355	3.90%	-2,150	-23.61%	9,107
Iowa	5,842	55.42%	4,221	40.04%	478	4.53%	1,621	15.38%	10,541
Iron	1,620	46.19%	1,734	49.44%	153	4.36%	-114	-3.25%	3,507
Jackson	4,380	52.04%	3,670	43.60%	367	4.36%	710	8.44%	8,417
Jefferson	15,203	42.11%	19,204	53.20%	1,692	4.69%	-4,001	-11.09%	36,099
Juneau	4,813	47.10%	4,910	48.05%	495	4.84%	-97	-0.95%	10,218
Kenosha	32,429	50.90%	28,891	45.35%	2,389	3.75%	3,538	5.55%	63,709
Kewaunee	4,670	46.31%	4,883	48.42%	531	5.27%	-213	-2.11%	10,084
La Crosse	28,455	51.22%	24,327	43.79%	2,777	5.00%	4,128	7.43%	55,559
Lafayette	3,710	51.08%	3,336	45.93%	217	2.99%	374	5.15%	7,263
Langlade	4,199	43.20%	5,125	52.72%	397	4.08%	-926	-9.52%	9,721
Lincoln	6,664	46.80%	6,727	47.24%	848	5.96%	-63	-0.44%	14,239
Manitowoc	17,667	45.51%	19,358	49.86%	1,799	4.63%	-1,691	-4.35%	38,824
Marathon	26,546	45.48%	28,883	49.48%	2,945	5.05%	-2,337	-4.00%	58,374
Marinette	8,676	43.55%	10,535	52.88%	710	3.56%	-1,859	-9.33%	19,921
Marquette	3,437	47.78%	3,522	48.96%	235	3.27%	-85	-1.18%	7,194
Menominee	949	76.97%	225	18.25%	59	4.79%	724	58.72%	1,233
Milwaukee	252,329	58.20%	163,491	37.71%	17,717	4.09%	88,838	20.49%	433,537
Monroe	7,460	45.67%	8,217	50.30%	658	4.03%	-757	-4.63%	16,335
Oconto	7,260	43.75%	8,706	52.46%	630	3.79%	-1,446	-8.71%	16,596
Oneida	8,339	44.14%	9,512	50.35%	1,040	5.51%	-1,173	-6.21%	18,891
Outagamie	32,735	43.22%	39,460	52.10%	3,547	4.68%	-6,725	-8.88%	75,742
Ozaukee	15,030	31.48%	31,155	65.24%	1,566	3.28%	-16,125	-33.76%	47,751
Pepin	1,854	50.60%	1,631	44.51%	179	4.89%	223	6.09%	3,664
Pierce	8,559	47.65%	8,169	45.48%	1,234	6.87%	390	2.17%	17,962
Polk	8,961	45.34%	9,557	48.36%	1,244	6.29%	-596	-3.02%	19,762
Portage	17,942	53.15%	13,214	39.14%	2,604	7.71%	4,728	14.01%	33,760
Price	3,413	43.04%	4,136	52.16%	381	4.80%	-723	-9.12%	7,930
Racine	41,563	46.77%	44,014	49.53%	3,288	3.70%	-2,451	-2.76%	88,865
Richland	3,837	46.27%	3,994	48.16%	462	5.57%	-157	-1.89%	8,293
Rock	40,472	57.49%	27,467	39.01%	2,465	3.50%	13,005	18.48%	70,404
Rusk	3,161	42.91%	3,758	51.02%	447	6.07%	-597	-8.11%	7,366
St. Croix	13,077	43.66%	15,240	50.88%	1,637	5.47%	-2,163	-7.22%	29,954
Sauk	13,035	50.81%	11,586	45.16%	1,032	4.02%	1,449	5.65%	25,653
Sawyer	3,333	42.91%	3,972	51.14%	462	5.95%	-639	-8.23%	7,767
Shawano	7,335	41.67%	9,548	54.24%	720	4.09%	-2,213	-12.57%	17,603
Sheboygan	23,569	42.70%	29,648	53.71%	1,984	3.59%	-6,079	-11.01%	55,201
Taylor	3,254	36.19%	5,278	58.70%	460	5.12%	-2,024	-22.51%	8,992
Trempealeau	6,678	54.88%	5,002	41.11%	488	4.01%	1,676	13.77%	12,168
Vernon	6,577	50.42%	5,684	43.58%	783	6.00%	893	6.84%	13,044
Vilas	4,706	38.19%	6,958	56.47%	658	5.34%	-2,252	-18.28%	12,322
Walworth	15,492	38.29%	22,982	56.80%	1,984	4.90%	-7,490	-18.51%	40,458
Washburn	3,695	45.93%	3,912	48.63%	438	5.44%	-217	-2.70%	8,045
Washington	18,115	29.50%	41,162	67.03%	2,135	3.48%	-23,047	-37.53%	61,412
Waukesha	64,319	31.57%	133,105	65.33%	6,310	3.10%	-68,786	-33.76%	203,734
Waupaca	8,787	38.53%	12,980	56.92%	1,037	4.55%	-4,193	-18.39%	22,804
Waushara	4,239	41.36%	5,571	54.36%	438	4.27%	-1,332	-13.00%	10,248
Winnebago	33,983	44.67%	38,330	50.38%	3,767	4.95%	-4,347	-5.71%	76,080
Wood	15,936	44.56%	17,803	49.78%	2,022	5.65%	-1,867	-5.22%	35,761
Totals	1,242,987	47.83%	1,237,279	47.61%	118,341	4.55%	5,708	0.22%	2,598,607

===== Counties that flipped from Democratic to Republican =====
- Barron (largest city: Rice Lake)
- Brown (largest city: Green Bay)
- Burnett (largest city: Grantsburg)
- Chippewa (largest city: Chippewa Falls)
- Clark (largest city: Neillsville)
- Door (largest city: Sturgeon Bay)
- Forest (largest city: Crandon)
- Iron (largest city: Hurley)
- Jefferson (largest city: Watertown)
- Juneau (largest city: Mauston)
- Kewaunee (largest city: Algoma)
- Langlade (largest city: Antigo)
- Lincoln (largest city: Merrill)
- Manitowoc (largest city: Manitowoc)
- Marathon (largest city: Wausau)
- Marinette (largest city: Marinette)
- Marquette (largest city: Montello)
- Monroe (largest city: Sparta)
- Oconto (largest city: Oconto)
- Oneida (largest city: Rhinelander)
- Outagamie (largest city: Appleton)
- Polk (largest city: Amery)
- Price (largest city: Park Falls)
- Racine (largest city: Racine)
- Richland (largest city: Richland Center)
- Rusk (largest city: Ladysmith)
- Sawyer (largest city: Hayward)
- Shawano (largest city: Shawano)
- Sheboygan (largest city: Sheboygan)
- St. Croix (largest city: Hudson)
- Taylor (largest city: Medford)
- Washburn (largest city: Spooner)
- Waushara (largest city: Berlin)
- Winnebago (largest city: Oshkosh)
- Wood (largest city: Marshfield)

==== By congressional district ====
Gore won five of nine congressional districts. Each candidate won a district that elected a representative of the other party.

District	Gore	Bush	Representative
1st	49%	47%	Paul Ryan
2nd	58%	36%	Tammy Baldwin
3rd	49%	46%	Ron Kind
4th	46%	50%	Jerry Kleczka
5th	65%	31%	Tom Barrett
6th	43%	53%	Tom Petri
7th	48%	46%	Dave Obey
8th	44%	52%	Mark Andrew Green
9th	34%	63%	Jim Sensenbrenner

== Electors ==
The electors of each state and the District of Columbia met on December 18, 2000 to cast their votes for president and vice president. The Electoral College itself never meets as one body. Instead, the electors from each state and the District of Columbia met in their respective capitols.

The following were the members of the Electoral College from the state. All were pledged to and voted for Al Gore and Joe Lieberman:

1. Alice Clausing
2. Pedro Colon
3. Paulette Copeland
4. Reynolds Honold
5. Joan Kaeding
6. Mark McQuate
7. Ruth Miner-Kessel
8. Christine Sinicki
9. Tim Sullivan
10. Angela Sutkiewicz
11. Charlie Wolden

== See also ==
- United States presidential elections in Wisconsin
