= Wisconsin Great Northern Railroad =

Railroad operating in Wisconsin, U.S., since 1997

Coordinates: 45°52′36.3″N 91°49′41.2″W

Overview
- Headquarters: Trego, Wisconsin
- Locale: Trego, Wisconsin, US
- Dates of operation: 1997–present

Technical
- Track gauge: 4 ft 8 1/2 in (1,435 mm) standard gauge
- Length: 26 miles (42 km)

Other
- Website: spoonertrainride.com

The Wisconsin Great Northern Railroad operates a historic train line centered in Trego, Wisconsin on 26 miles of track, between Spooner, Wisconsin and Hayward, Wisconsin with the passenger service stopping at Springbrook, Wisconsin. It was founded on April 1, 1997. The line runs dinner trains, bed and breakfast trains, and scenic sight seeing tours.

== Freight Operations ==
The Wisconsin great northern railroad has a switching contract with the Canadian national (CN) railroad to service LP and JOHNSON / FUTUREWOOD in Hayward Wisconsin. The Service is run 5 days a week from hayward-to-hayward jct. Freight operations also have online customers in Springbrook Wisconsin also.

== Locomotives ==
- LS&M #41 - GE 50-Ton Diesel Locomotive one of 3 50 tonner prototypes built in 1941
- WGN #314 - Former Green Bay & Western Alco C424 Diesel Locomotive (privately owned)
- WGN #423 - Former Chicago & North Western EMD F7
- WGN #600 - Former B&OCTRR EMD SW1
- WGN #862 - Former Milwaukee Road EMD SW1
- WGN #891 - Former Allis Chalmers plant switcher EMD SW1
- WGN #1280 - Former American Can/Marathon Southern EMD SW600
- WGN #1386 - Former TP EMD GP35M
- WGN #1387 - Former MP EMD GP35M
- WGN #1388 - Former TP EMD GP35M
- WGN #1950 - Former Great Northern EMD F7
- WGN #1951 - Former Great Northern EMD F7
- WGN #6006 - Former Algoma Central Railway SD40-2, used for freight
- WGN #8760 - Rebuilt 1949 Alco S2M
- CB&Q #9903 “Injun Joe” - Acquired along with the rest of the Mark Twain Zephyr consist in July 2020.
- Duluth & Northeastern 27 - Acquired April 2024

== Passenger ==
- WGN #1 "Allen L. Vreeland" - Originally a Pullman 1914 business car built for the Santa Fe, the owners private car
- WGN #8 Budd RDC-1 Diesel Rail Car - Originally an RDC for the New York Central Railroad, currently out of service
- WGN #9 "Namekagon Dreams" - Originally a double bedroom buffet car for the Atlantic Coast Line, now a sleeper on the Bed & Breakfast Train
- WGN #10 "Pine Cavern" - Originally a Budd-built sleeping car for the Santa Fe, currently in service
- WGN #12 "Sleepy Hollow" - Originally a sleeper/lounge car for the Union Pacific, currently in service
- WGN #13 "Royal Palm" - Originally an 11-bedroom sleeping car for the CNO&TP, currently out of service
- WGN #14 Chapel Car - Originally a Long Island Railroad coach car, currently out of service
- WGN #15 "Cascade Falls" - Originally a Budd-built 50-seat coach for the CB&Q, used on the Dinner Train through March 2020/currently out of service
- WGN #24 Santa Car - Originally a railroad post office car for the Milwaukee Road, now used on the Santa Pizza Train
- WGN #26 "East Lexington" - Originally a 12-section and one drawing room car for Pullman, currently out of service
- WGN #27 - Originally a wide vision cupola caboose, currently out of service
- WGN #32 "Apostle Isle" - Originally an 80-seat coach for the Duluth and Northern Minnesota Railway, now a 64-seat diner, currently in service on sight seeing trains
- WGN #34 "Presque Isle" - Originally an 80-seat coach that was formerly used on Duluth, Missabe & Iron Range Railway on Maintenance-of-way trains, now a 56-seat diner, currently out of service
- WGN #100 "Amnicon Falls" & "Manitou Falls" - Originally an articulated coach car on the Southern Pacific Railroad, currently contains 7 private dining rooms and is used on the Dinner Train
- WGN #112 "Richard F. Gilberg" - Originally a mail and express car for the Duluth & Iron Range Railway (D&IR), rebuilt by the WGNRR as a club car, currently out of regular service
- WLRY(Wisconsin line railway) #143 DM&IR Caboose - Originally Duluth & Iron Range Caboose #C-43 blt 1889, currently being resorted by the railroad and on display next to the Trego Depot (privately owned)
- WGN #200 Kitchen Car - Originally a Havelock CB&Q Baggage Car, converted to a kitchen car by the Columbia Star Dinner Train, currently out of service
- WGN #300 "Copper Falls" & "Morgan Falls" - Originally an articulated coach car on the Texas & New Orleans Railroad, currently contains 7 private dining rooms and is used on the Dinner Train
- WGN #316 "Madeline" - St. Louis Car Company designed this as Southern Traction Car #315 in 1913, occasionally used for Sightseeing trains, currently out of service
- WGN #500 - "Effie Dean" - Tavern-Lounge in the Mark Twain Zephyr consist.
- WGN #506 "Becky Thatcher" - "Becky Thatcher" - Baggage Car in the Mark Twain Zephyr consist.
- WGN #551 "Huckleberry Finn" - Dining Car in the Mark Twain Zephyr consist.
- Ex-#551 - Former Roseville Crossing Car - Originally a coach car constructed in 1948 for the Milwaukee Road, acquired by the WGNRR in 2021 and currently out of service
- WGN #573 "Tom Sawyer" - Observation-Lounge Car in the Mark Twain Zephyr consist.
- WGN #1341 "Willow Falls" - Originally a dining car for the Canadian National, now a new kitchen/dining car that debuted in 2022 on the Bed & Breakfast and Dinner Train
- WGN #2000 Namekagon Coach - Car built as part of the Namekagon Train which ran between the Twin Cities and Ashland, currently out of service and parked in the Spooner, Wisconsin yard
- WGN #2004 - Originally a 24-section car built in 1954 for the Canadian National, currently out of service
- WGN #3003 "Aristocrat" - Originally a tavern lounge for the Nashville, Chattanooga & St. Louis Railroad, used on the Bed & Breakfast and Dinner Trains
- WGN #6226 - Originally a 52-seat coach built for the Seaboard Air Line, moved to the Wisconsin Great Northern in 2014, currently out of service
- WGN #10674 - Originally a Gulf, Mobile & Ohio Coach car, featured in the movie In the Heat of the Night, currently out of service awaiting restoration
- WGN #39972 - Originally a Santa Fe Hi-Level Lounge and Amtrak Pacific Parlour Car, currently used on the railroad's Wine & Cheese Train
- Former Pearl Lake Engine & 2 Cabooses (acquired February 2021 and awaiting restoration)
- "Winette" / "Captain Hook" - Originally a Pullman business car built in 1930 built for W.R. Reynolds of the Reading Transit & Light Company, currently out of service awaiting restoration (privately owned)
- Former C&NW Baggage Car - constructed in the 1920s or 1930s and used for many decades along the various lines of the C&NW in the central United States
- Former M&StL Doodlebug
- Former Alfred E. Perlman private car "Destroyer of Locomotives" built in 1923.14

== Freight ==
- Flat Car WGN #250578
- Flat Car WGN #985353
- Two Log cars

== Utility ==
- Former Duluth, Missabe & Iron Range Railway crane X-7 & Boom Car #W6331.
- WGN #1114 Power Car - Originally a baggage car for the Milwaukee Road, currently used as a power car for most passenger trains at the Wisconsin Great Northern Railroad
- WGN #421 "Bear's Den" - Originally a 14-section Touralux sleeping car for the Milwaukee Road, was used by the WGNRR as a crew car, currently out of service
- WGN #432 - Originally a Milwaukee Road RPO-Express car for the Olympian Hiawatha in early 1947, currently out of service
