= Washburn County, Wisconsin =

County in Wisconsin, United States

- County
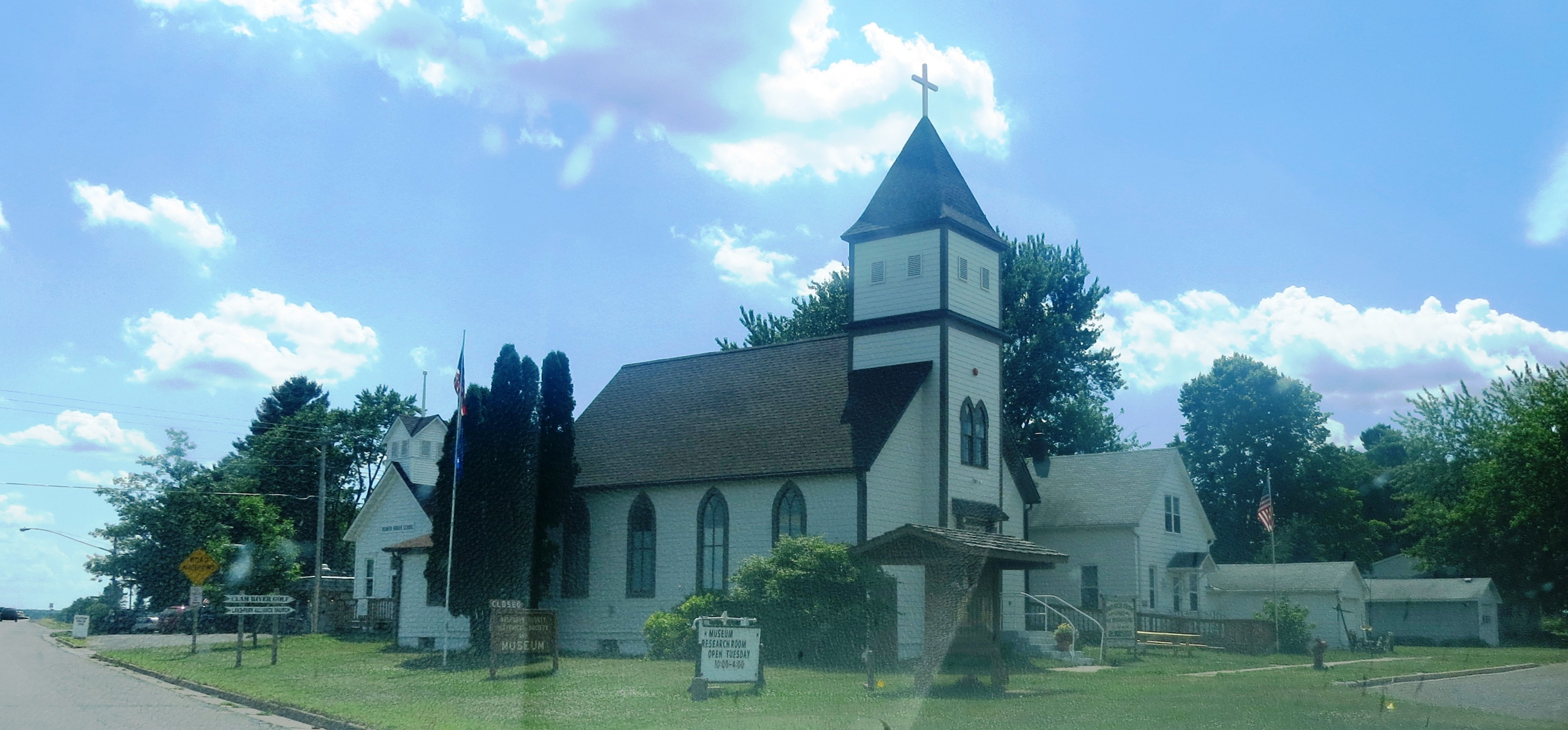
- Historical Museum in Shell Lake, Wisconsin

- Location within the U.S. state of Wisconsin
- Coordinates: 45°54′N 91°47′W
- Country: United States
- State: Wisconsin
- Founded: 1883
- Named for: Cadwallader C. Washburn
- Seat: Shell Lake
- Largest city: Spooner

Area
  - Total: 853 sq mi (2,210 km^{2})
  - Land: 797 sq mi (2,060 km^{2})
  - Water: 56 sq mi (150 km^{2}) 6.6%

Population (2020)
  - Total: 16,623
  - Estimate (2025): 17,087 ▲
  - Density: 20.9/sq mi (8.1/km^{2})
- Time zone: UTC−6 (Central)
  - Summer (DST): UTC−5 (CDT)
- Congressional district: 7th
- Website: www.co.washburn.wi.us

Washburn County is a county in the U.S. state of Wisconsin. It is named after Governor Cadwallader C. Washburn. As of the 2020 census, the population was 16,623. Its county seat is Shell Lake. The county was created in 1883. The county is considered a high-recreation retirement destination by the U.S. Department of Agriculture.

== Geography ==
Soils of Washburn County

According to the U.S. Census Bureau, the county has a total area of 853 square miles (2,210 km^{2}), of which 797 square miles (2,060 km^{2}) is land and 56 square miles (150 km^{2}) (6.6%) is water.

=== Major highways ===
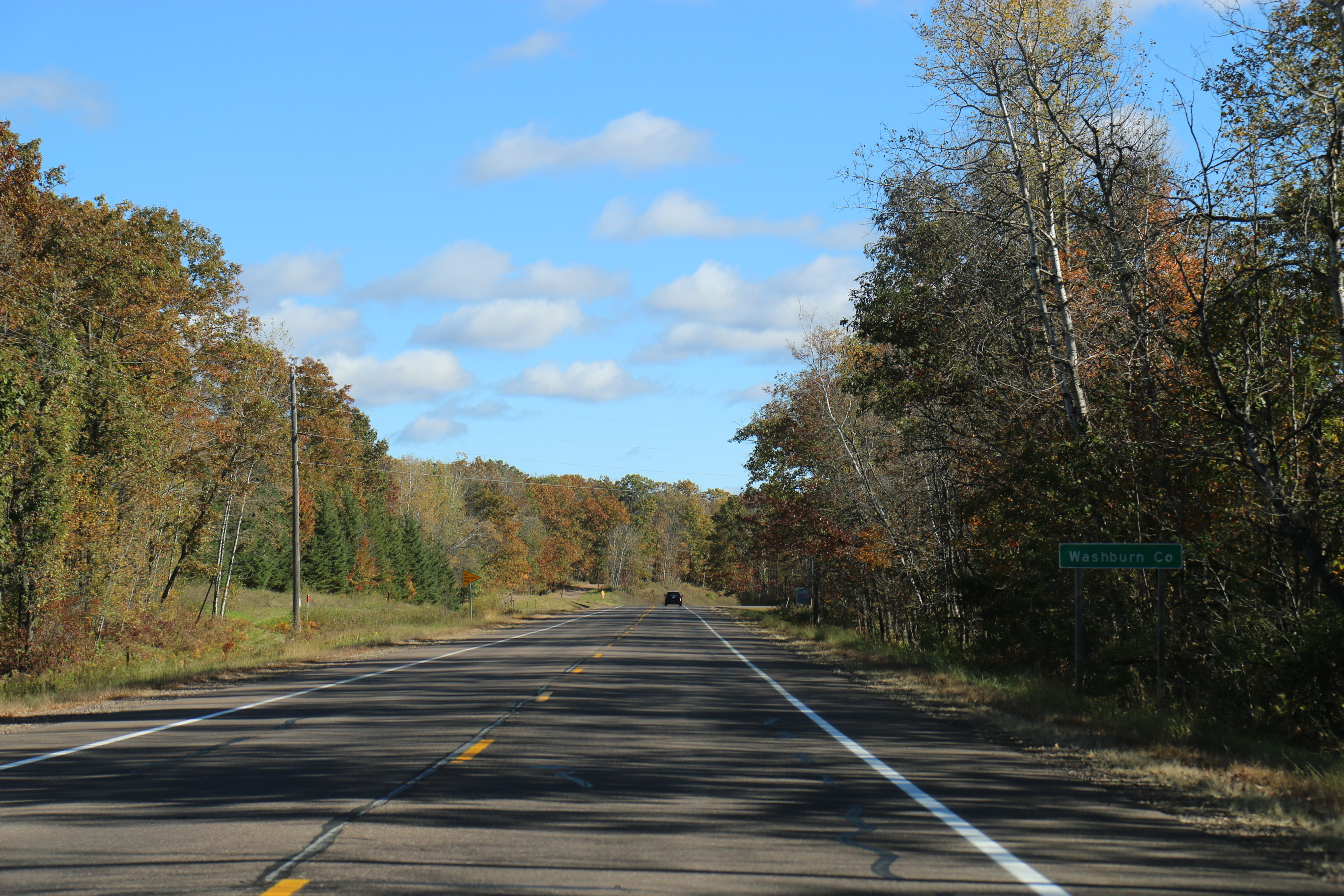
The sign for Washburn County on WIS48

- U.S. Highway 53
- U.S. Highway 63
- Highway 48 (Wisconsin)
- Highway 70 (Wisconsin)
- Highway 77 (Wisconsin)
- Highway 253 (Wisconsin)

=== Railroads ===
- Canadian National
- Wisconsin Great Northern Railroad

=== Airport ===
Shell Lake Municipal Airport (KSSQ) serves the county and surrounding communities.

=== Adjacent counties ===
- Douglas County – north
- Bayfield County – northeast
- Sawyer County – east
- Rusk County – southeast
- Barron County – south
- Burnett County – west

=== National protected area ===
- Saint Croix National Scenic Riverway (part)

== Demographics ==
Historical population
Census	Pop.	Note	%±
1890	2,926		—
1900	5,521		88.7%
1910	8,196		48.5%
1920	11,377		38.8%
1930	11,103		−2.4%
1940	12,496		12.5%
1950	11,665		−6.7%
1960	10,301		−11.7%
1970	10,601		2.9%
1980	13,174		24.3%
1990	13,772		4.5%
2000	16,036		16.4%
2010	15,911		−0.8%
2020	16,623		4.5%
2025 (est.)	17,087	▲	2.8%
U.S. Decennial Census; 1790–1960 1900–1990; 1990–2000 2010 2020

=== Racial and ethnic composition ===
Washburn County, Wisconsin – Racial and ethnic composition Note: the US Census treats Hispanic/Latino as an ethnic category. This table excludes Latinos from the racial categories and assigns them to a separate category. Hispanics/Latinos may be of any race.
Race / ethnicity (NH = Non-Hispanic)	Pop 1980	Pop 1990	Pop 2000	Pop 2010	Pop 2020	% 1980	% 1990	% 2000	% 2010	% 2020
White alone (NH)	13,024	13,554	15,504	15,228	15,348	98.86%	98.42%	96.68%	95.71%	92.33%
Black or African American alone (NH)	13	25	25	26	30	0.10%	0.18%	0.16%	0.16%	0.18%
Native American or Alaska Native alone (NH)	90	122	153	174	182	0.68%	0.89%	0.95%	1.09%	1.09%
Asian alone (NH)	10	33	28	59	59	0.08%	0.24%	0.17%	0.37%	0.35%
Native Hawaiian or Pacific Islander alone (NH)	x	x	4	2	4	x	x	0.02%	0.01%	0.02%
Other race alone (NH)	3	4	2	1	36	0.02%	0.03%	0.01%	0.01%	0.22%
Mixed race or Multiracial (NH)	x	x	177	213	665	x	x	1.10%	1.34%	4.00%
Hispanic or Latino (any race)	34	34	143	208	299	0.26%	0.25%	0.89%	1.31%	1.80%
Total	13,174	13,772	16,036	15,911	16,623	100.00%	100.00%	100.00%	100.00%	100.00%

=== 2020 census ===
As of the 2020 census, the county had a population of 16,623. The population density was 20.9 people per square mile (8.1 people/km^{2}). There were 12,708 housing units at an average density of 15.9 units per square mile (6.1 units/km^{2}).

The median age was 52.9 years. 18.1% of residents were under the age of 18 and 28.8% of residents were 65 years of age or older. For every 100 females there were 100.5 males, and for every 100 females age 18 and over there were 99.6 males age 18 and over.

The racial makeup of the county was 92.9% White, 0.2% Black or African American, 1.2% American Indian and Alaska Native, 0.4% Asian, 0.1% Native Hawaiian and Pacific Islander, 0.5% from some other race, and 4.8% from two or more races. Hispanic or Latino residents of any race comprised 1.8% of the population.

There were 7,480 households in the county, of which 20.5% had children under the age of 18 living in them. Of all households, 52.3% were married-couple households, 19.1% were households with a male householder and no spouse or partner present, and 21.0% were households with a female householder and no spouse or partner present. About 29.7% of all households were made up of individuals and 15.9% had someone living alone who was 65 years of age or older. There were 12,708 housing units, of which 41.1% were vacant. Among occupied housing units, 79.7% were owner-occupied and 20.3% were renter-occupied. The homeowner vacancy rate was 2.0% and the rental vacancy rate was 6.8%.

<0.1% of residents lived in urban areas, while 100.0% lived in rural areas.

=== 2000 census ===
2000 Census Age Pyramid for Washburn County

As of the 2000 census, there were 16,036 people, 6,604 households, and 4,530 families residing in the county. The population density was 20 people per square mile (7.7 people/km^{2}). There were 10,814 housing units at an average density of 13 units per square mile (5.0 units/km^{2}). The racial makeup of the county was 97.27% White, 0.17% Black or African American, 1.01% Native American, 0.19% Asian, 0.02% Pacific Islander, 0.12% from other races, and 1.22% from two or more races. 0.89% of the population were Hispanic or Latino of any race. 33.9% were of German, 11.4% Norwegian, 7.0% Irish, 6.2% Swedish, 6.1% English and 5.6% American ancestry.

There were 6,604 households, out of which 27.5% had children under the age of 18 living with them, 57.6% were married couples living together, 7.0% had a female householder with no husband present, and 31.4% were non-families. 26.7% of all households were made up of individuals, and 12.6% had someone living alone who was 65 years of age or older. The average household size was 2.39 and the average family size was 2.88.

In the county, the population was spread out, with 23.8% under the age of 18, 5.8% from 18 to 24, 24.7% from 25 to 44, 27.1% from 45 to 64, and 18.5% who were 65 years of age or older. The median age was 42 years. For every 100 females there were 101.3 males. For every 100 females age 18 and over, there were 98.3 males.

In 2017, there were 153 births, giving a general fertility rate of 70.0 births per 1000 women aged 15–44, the 17th highest rate out of all 72 Wisconsin counties. Additionally, there were fewer than five reported induced abortions performed on women of Washburn County residence in 2017.

== Communities ==
=== Cities ===
- Shell Lake (county seat)
- Spooner

=== Villages ===
- Birchwood
- Minong

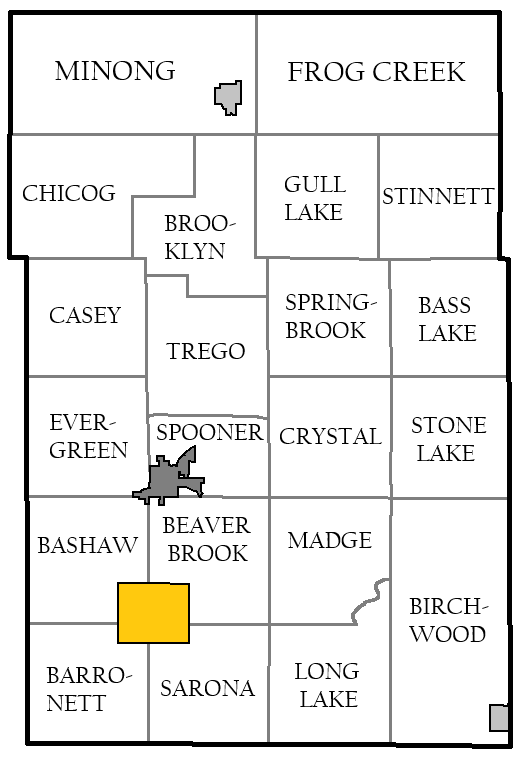
Towns of Washburn County

=== Towns ===
- Barronett
- Bashaw
- Bass Lake
- Beaver Brook
- Birchwood
- Brooklyn
- Casey
- Chicog
- Crystal
- Evergreen
- Frog Creek
- Gull Lake
- Long Lake
- Madge
- Minong
- Sarona
- Spooner
- Springbrook
- Stinnett
- Stone Lake
- Trego

=== Census-designated places ===
- Springbrook
- Stone Lake (part)
- Trego

=== Other unincorporated communities ===
- Beaver Brook
- Chicago Junction
- Chittamo
- Earl
- Lampson
- Madge
- Nobleton
- Sarona
- Springbrook
- Stanberry

=== Ghost towns ===
- Harmon

== Politics ==
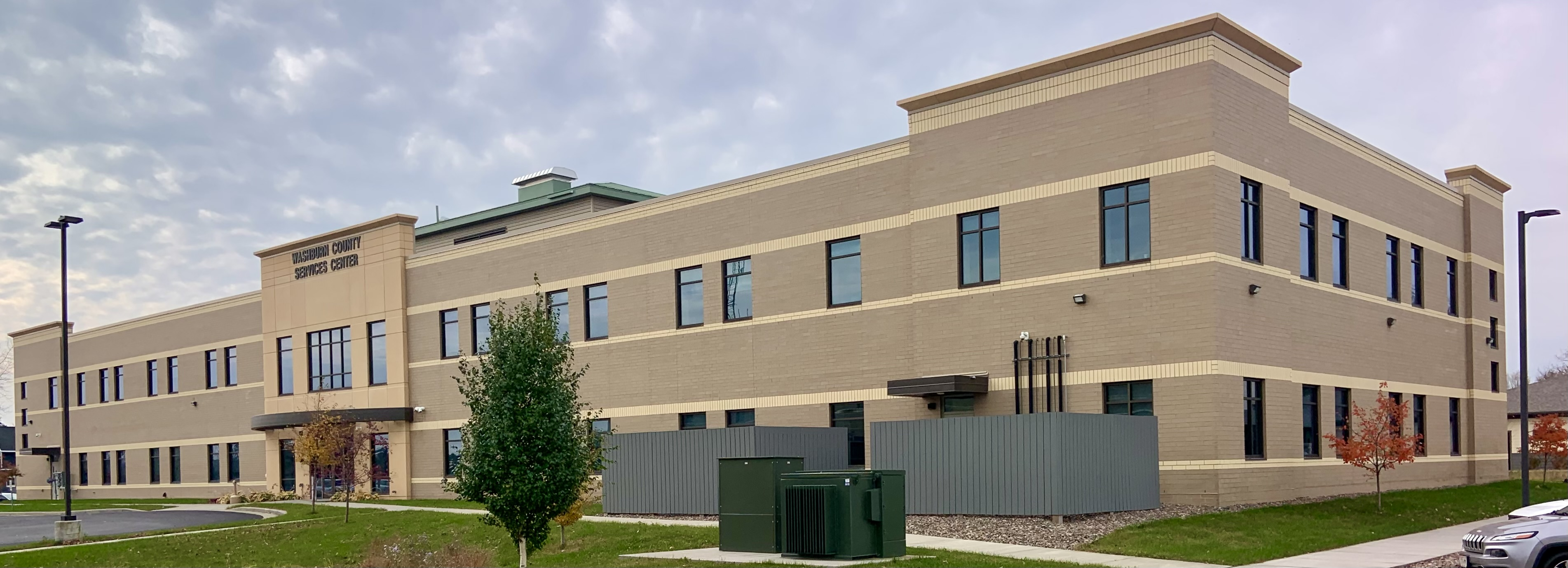
Washburn County Services Center

During the 1930s and 1940s at the state level Washburn county was a stronghold for the Wisconsin Progressive Party - National Progressives. voting consistently for Philip La Follette during gubernatorial elections and Robert M. La Follette Jr. for senate.

United States presidential election results for Washburn County, Wisconsin
Year	Republican		Democratic		Third party(ies)	
Year	No.	%	No.	%	No.	%
1892	488	57.82%	305	36.14%	51	6.04%
1896	771	73.29%	250	23.76%	31	2.95%
1900	808	73.99%	253	23.17%	31	2.84%
1904	989	77.33%	207	16.18%	83	6.49%
1908	1,114	69.02%	396	24.54%	104	6.44%
1912	409	27.52%	398	26.78%	679	45.69%
1916	938	55.37%	644	38.02%	112	6.61%
1920	2,023	78.26%	352	13.62%	210	8.12%
1924	1,422	38.91%	158	4.32%	2,075	56.77%
1928	2,898	70.03%	1,192	28.81%	48	1.16%
1932	1,501	34.68%	2,619	60.51%	208	4.81%
1936	1,650	31.64%	3,220	61.74%	345	6.62%
1940	2,805	48.68%	2,901	50.35%	56	0.97%
1944	2,441	53.85%	2,059	45.42%	33	0.73%
1948	2,059	41.81%	2,708	54.98%	158	3.21%
1952	3,184	60.80%	2,039	38.93%	14	0.27%
1956	2,798	58.88%	1,935	40.72%	19	0.40%
1960	2,848	54.13%	2,398	45.58%	15	0.29%
1964	1,865	36.84%	3,181	62.84%	16	0.32%
1968	2,425	47.63%	2,273	44.65%	393	7.72%
1972	3,220	56.84%	2,336	41.24%	109	1.92%
1976	2,787	43.20%	3,503	54.30%	161	2.50%
1980	3,193	46.41%	3,172	46.10%	515	7.49%
1984	3,848	54.38%	3,188	45.05%	40	0.57%
1988	3,074	47.25%	3,393	52.15%	39	0.60%
1992	2,586	33.65%	3,080	40.07%	2,020	26.28%
1996	2,703	38.64%	3,231	46.18%	1,062	15.18%
2000	3,912	48.63%	3,695	45.93%	438	5.44%
2004	4,762	49.78%	4,705	49.18%	100	1.05%
2008	4,303	47.22%	4,693	51.50%	116	1.27%
2012	4,699	50.60%	4,447	47.88%	141	1.52%
2016	5,436	59.13%	3,282	35.70%	475	5.17%
2020	6,334	61.03%	3,867	37.26%	177	1.71%
2024	6,962	63.42%	3,867	35.22%	149	1.36%

Between 1964 and 2008, Washburn County backed the nationwide winner in every election except for 1988. In 2012, Mitt Romney defeated Barack Obama in the county by a margin of less than 3%, after Obama had won the county by more than 4% in 2008 over John McCain. Washburn County moved significantly to the right in 2016, as Donald Trump took over 59% of the county's vote and won by a margin of over 23%, the best margin of victory for any candidate in the county since 1964. He slightly increased his margin of victory to nearly 24% in 2020 and further increased it to more than 28% in 2024 while turning in the best vote share for any candidate in the county since 1928 at over 63%.

== Education ==
School districts include:

- Birchwood School District
- Hayward Community School District
- Northwood School District
- Rice Lake Area School District
- Shell Lake School District
- Spooner Area School District

In 1918, the loss of the SS Tuscania prompted the county to burn its German textbooks as part of anti-German sentiment in World War I.

== See also ==
- National Register of Historic Places listings in Washburn County, Wisconsin
