= Chicog, Wisconsin =

Town in Wisconsin, United States

- Town
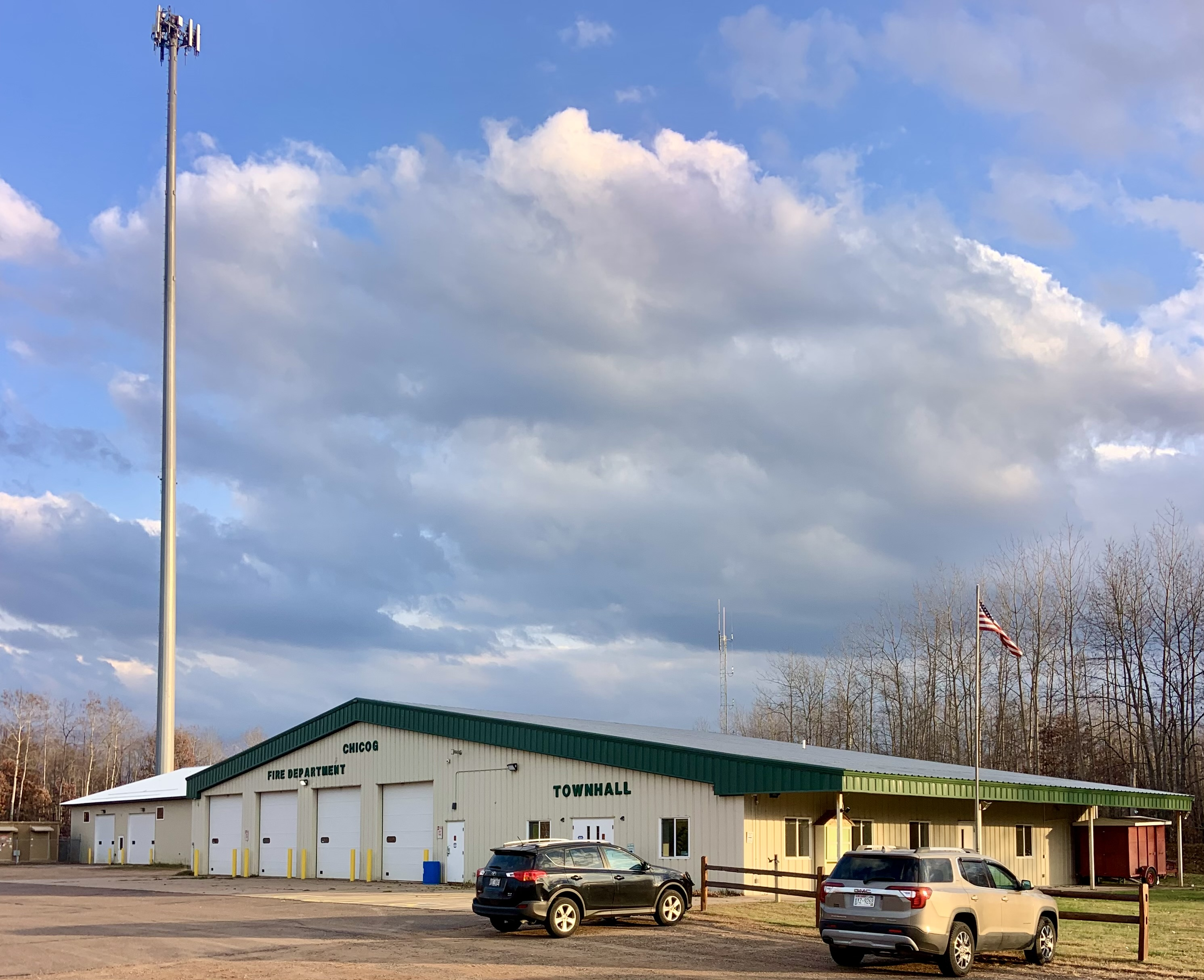
- Town hall

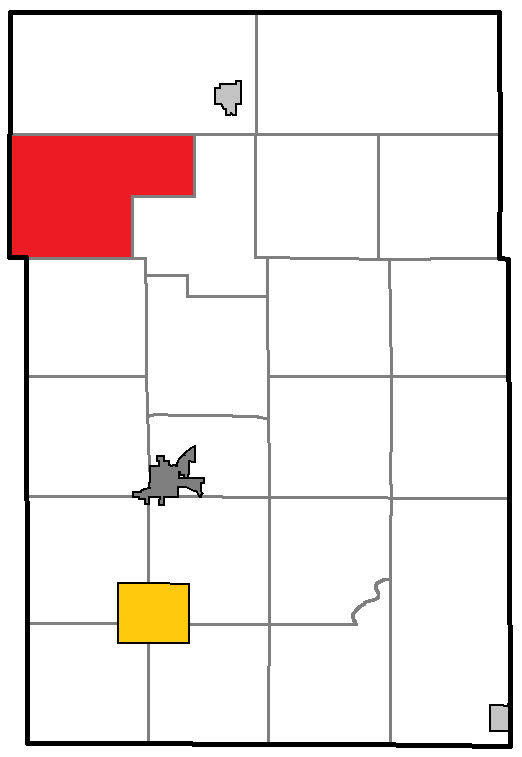
- Location of Chicog, within Washburn County
- Coordinates: 46°2′36″N 91°57′30″W
- Country: United States
- State: Wisconsin
- County: Washburn

Area
  - Total: 45.6 sq mi (118.1 km^{2})
  - Land: 43.6 sq mi (112.9 km^{2})
  - Water: 2.0 sq mi (5.2 km^{2})
- Elevation: 1,001 ft (305 m)

Population (2020)
  - Total: 292
  - Density: 6.70/sq mi (2.59/km^{2})
- Time zone: UTC-6 (Central (CST))
  - Summer (DST): UTC-5 (CDT)
- Area codes: 715 & 534
- FIPS code: 55-14425
- GNIS feature ID: 1582953
- Website: http://townofchicog.com

Chicog is a town in Washburn County, Wisconsin, United States. The population was 292 at the 2020 census.

== Geography ==
According to the United States Census Bureau, the town has a total area of 45.6 square miles (118.1 km^{2}), of which 43.6 square miles (112.8 km^{2}) is land and 2.0 square miles (5.2 km^{2}) (4.43%) is water.

== Demographics ==
As of the census of 2000, there were 268 people, 128 households, and 86 families residing in the town. The population density was 6.2 people per square mile (2.4/km^{2}). There were 476 housing units at an average density of 10.9 per square mile (4.2/km^{2}). The racial makeup of the town was 97.76% White, 1.12% Native American, 0.37% from other races, and 0.75% from two or more races. Hispanic or Latino of any race were 0.75% of the population.

There were 128 households, out of which 14.8% had children under the age of 18 living with them, 61.7% were married couples living together, 1.6% had a female householder with no husband present, and 32.8% were non-families. 29.7% of all households were made up of individuals, and 9.4% had someone living alone who was 65 years of age or older. The average household size was 2.09 and the average family size was 2.52.

In the town, the population was spread out, with 12.3% under the age of 18, 4.1% from 18 to 24, 20.9% from 25 to 44, 40.3% from 45 to 64, and 22.4% who were 65 years of age or older. The median age was 52 years. For every 100 females, there were 109.4 males. For every 100 females age 18 and over, there were 111.7 males.

The median income for a household in the town was $32,500, and the median income for a family was $33,571. Males had a median income of $30,313 versus $17,250 for females. The per capita income for the town was $16,438. About 4.3% of families and 9.4% of the population were below the poverty line, including 9.1% of those under the age of eighteen and 3.6% of those 65 or over.
