= Barronett, Wisconsin =

Town in Wisconsin, United States

- Town
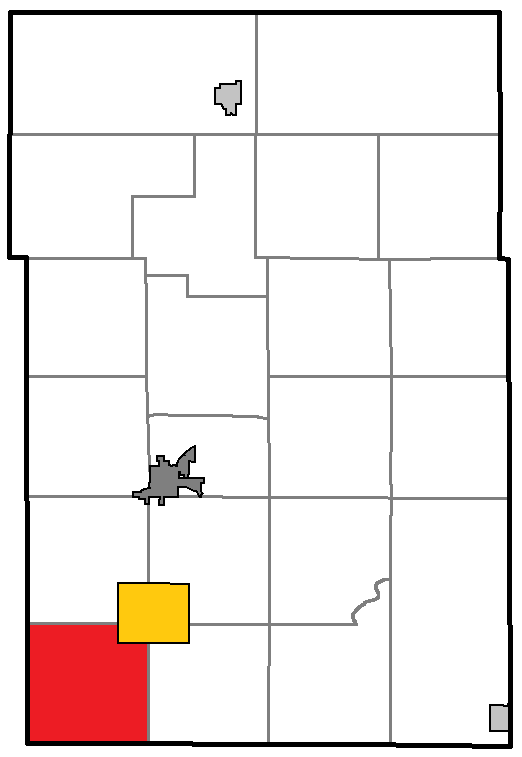
- Location of Barronett, within Washburn County
- Coordinates: 45°40′51″N 91°58′19″W
- Country: United States
- State: Wisconsin
- County: Washburn

Area
  - Total: 33.7 sq mi (87.2 km^{2})
  - Land: 32.7 sq mi (84.8 km^{2})
  - Water: 0.89 sq mi (2.3 km^{2})
- Elevation: 1,440 ft (439 m)

Population (2020)
  - Total: 461
  - Density: 14.1/sq mi (5.44/km^{2})
- Time zone: UTC-6 (Central (CST))
  - Summer (DST): UTC-5 (CDT)
- Postal code: 54813
- Area codes: 715 & 534
- FIPS code: 55-04950
- GNIS feature ID: 1582757

Barronett is a town in Washburn County, Wisconsin, United States. The population was 461 at the 2020 census.

== Geography ==
According to the United States Census Bureau, the town has a total area of 33.7 square miles (87.2 km^{2}), of which 32.8 square miles (84.8 km^{2}) is land and 0.9 square mile (2.3 km^{2}) (2.67%) is water.

== Demographics ==
As of the census of 2000, there were 405 people, 152 households, and 117 families residing in the town. The population density was 12.4 people per square mile (4.8/km^{2}). There were 192 housing units at an average density of 5.9 per square mile (2.3/km^{2}). The racial makeup of the town was 97.53% White, 0.49% African American, 0.25% Native American, 0.25% Asian, and 1.48% from two or more races. Hispanic or Latino of any race were 0.49% of the population.

There were 152 households, out of which 30.9% had children under the age of 18 living with them, 67.8% were married couples living together, 4.6% had a female householder with no husband present, and 23.0% were non-families. 19.1% of all households were made up of individuals, and 7.2% had someone living alone who was 65 years of age or older. The average household size was 2.66 and the average family size was 2.97.

In the town, the population was spread out, with 23.5% under the age of 18, 7.7% from 18 to 24, 27.2% from 25 to 44, 29.4% from 45 to 64, and 12.3% who were 65 years of age or older. The median age was 38 years. For every 100 females, there were 116.6 males. For every 100 females age 18 and over, there were 113.8 males.

The median income for a household in the town was $40,139, and the median income for a family was $42,500. Males had a median income of $27,750 versus $23,125 for females. The per capita income for the town was $14,434. About 4.2% of families and 6.0% of the population were below the poverty line, including 4.3% of those under age 18 and 10.4% of those age 65 or over.
