= Long Lake, Washburn County, Wisconsin =

Town in Wisconsin, United States

Long Lake, Wisconsin
- Town
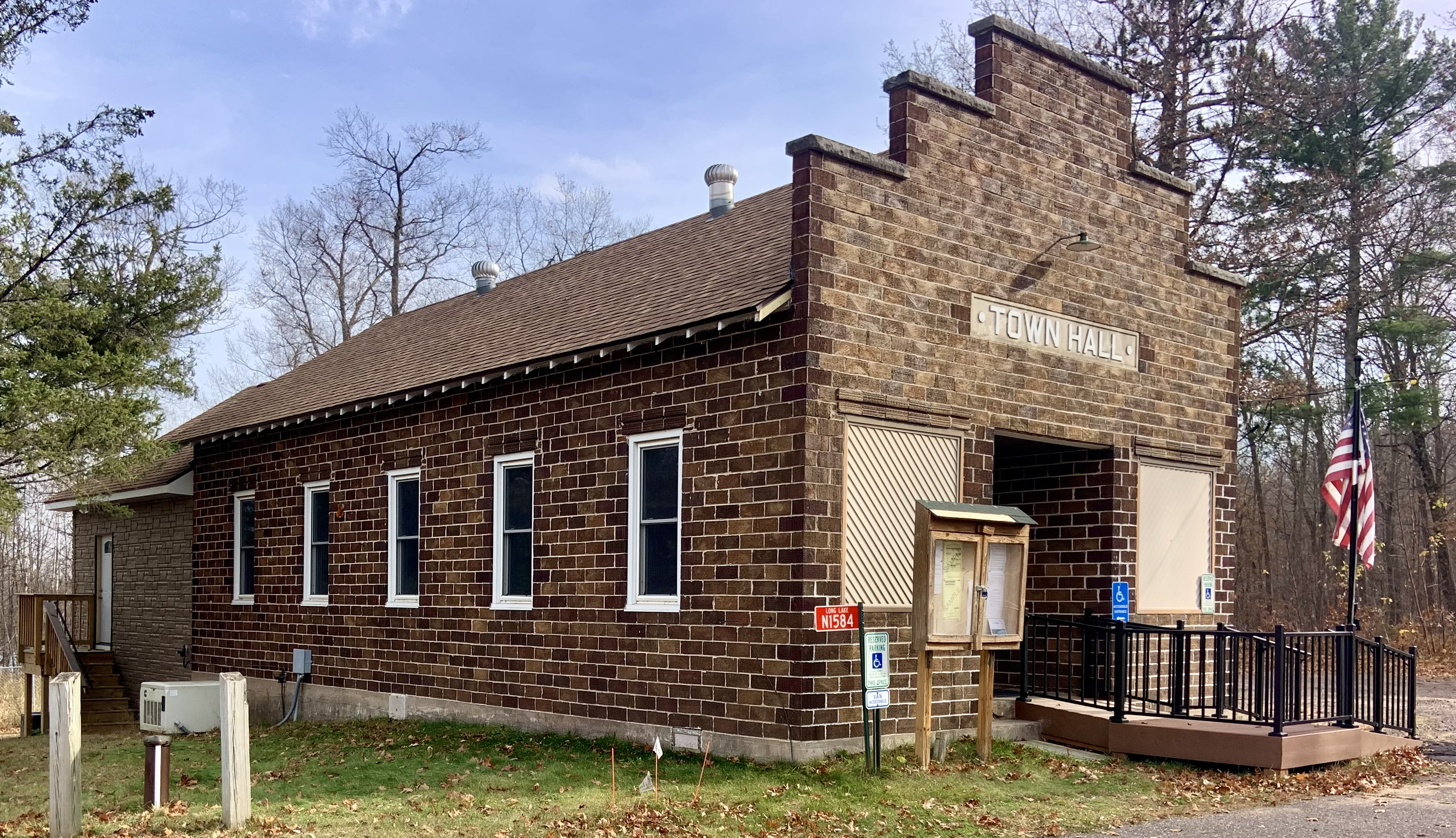
- Town hall

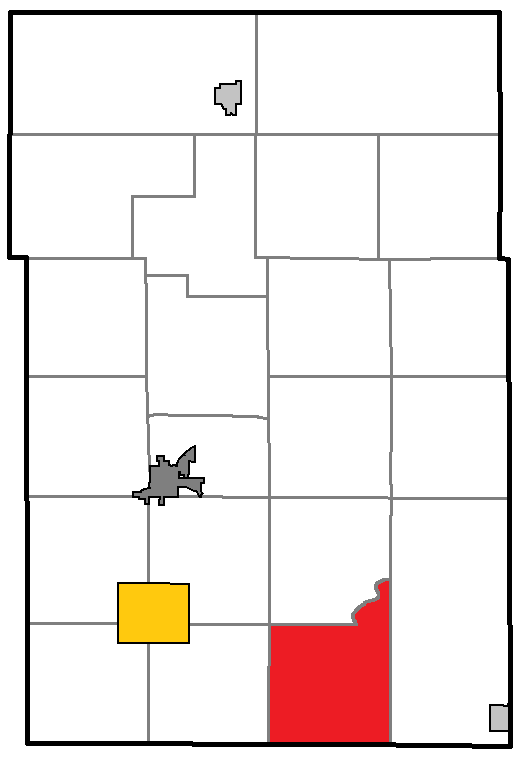
- Location of Long Lake, within Washburn County, Wisconsin
- Coordinates: 45°41′36″N 91°43′8″W
- Country: United States
- State: Wisconsin
- County: Washburn

Area
  - Total: 37.8 sq mi (97.8 km^{2})
  - Land: 32.6 sq mi (84.5 km^{2})
  - Water: 5.1 sq mi (13.3 km^{2})
- Elevation: 1,250 ft (380 m)

Population (2020)
  - Total: 628
  - Density: 19.2/sq mi (7.43/km^{2})
- Time zone: UTC-6 (Central (CST))
  - Summer (DST): UTC-5 (CDT)
- Area codes: 715 & 534
- FIPS code: 55-45650
- GNIS feature ID: 1583597
- Website: https://townoflonglake.us/

Long Lake is a town in Washburn County, Wisconsin, United States. The population was 628 at the 2020 census. The unincorporated community of Nobleton is located in the town.

== Geography ==
According to the United States Census Bureau, the town has a total area of 37.8 square miles (97.8 km^{2}), of which 32.6 square miles (84.5 km^{2}) is land and 5.1 square miles (13.3 km^{2}) (13.59%) is water.

== Demographics ==
At the 2000 census there were 737 people, 284 households and 211 families in the town. The population density was 22.6 people per square mile (8.7/km^{2}). There were 590 housing units at an average density of 18.1 per square mile (7.0/km^{2}). The racial makeup of the town was 98.10% White, 0.68% Native American, 0.27% Asian, and 0.95% from two or more races. Hispanic or Latino of any race were 0.54%.

Of the 284 households 28.9% had children under the age of 18 living with them, 67.6% were married couples living together, 3.2% had a female householder with no husband present, and 25.4% were non-families. 21.1% of households were one person and 10.6% were one person aged 65 or older. The average household size was 2.57 and the average family size was 2.96.

The age distribution was 27.1% under the age of 18, 3.7% from 18 to 24, 23.9% from 25 to 44, 28.2% from 45 to 64 and 17.1% 65 or older. The median age was 42 years. For every 100 females, there were 105.9 males. For every 100 females age 18 and over, there were 105.7 males.

The median household income was $40,208 and the median family income was $42,778. Males had a median income of $31,705 versus $22,083 for females. The per capita income for the town was $18,049. About 3.7% of families and 5.2% of the population were below the poverty line, including 3.8% of those under age 18 and 10.6% of those age 65 or over.
