= Bashaw, Wisconsin =

Town in Wisconsin, United States

- Town
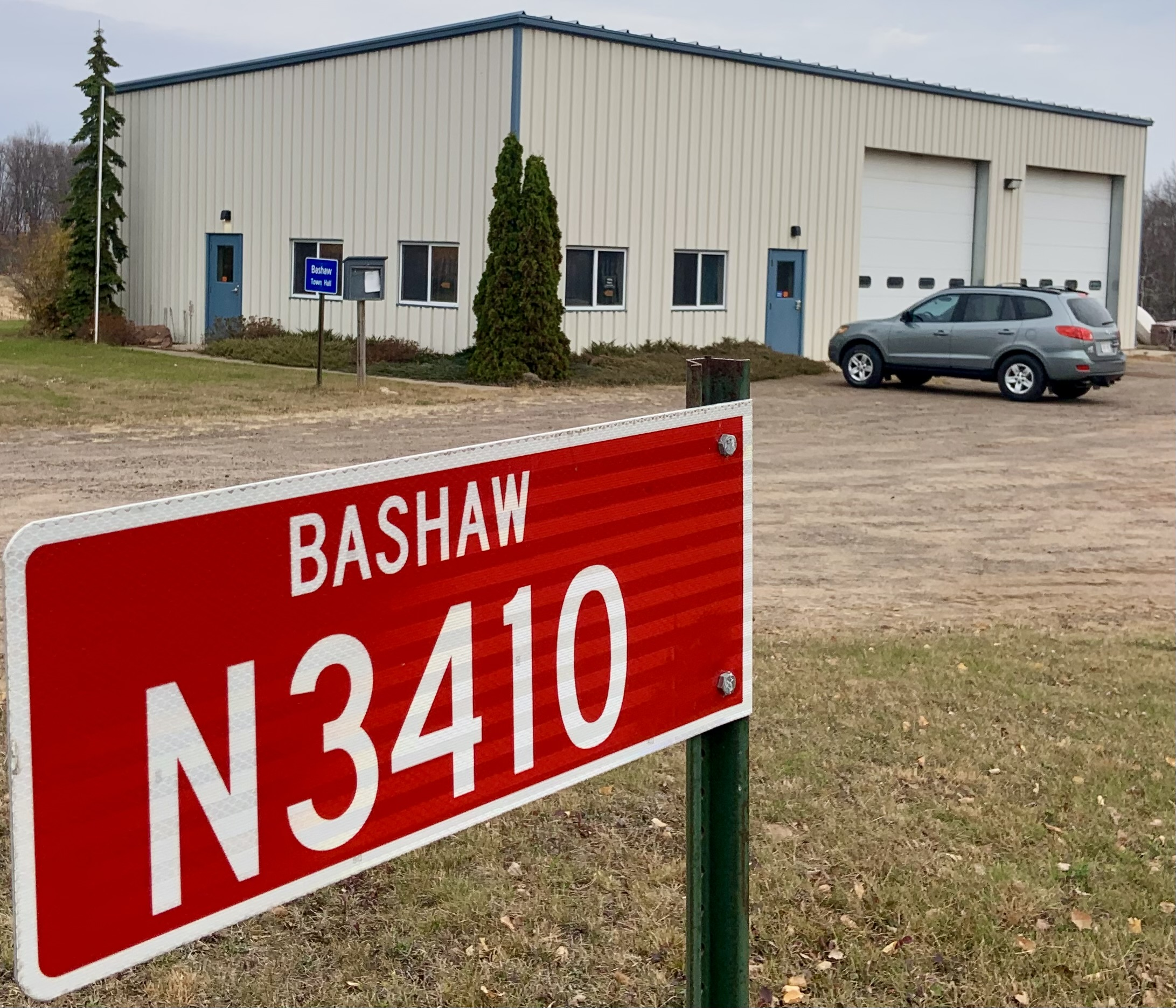
- Town hall

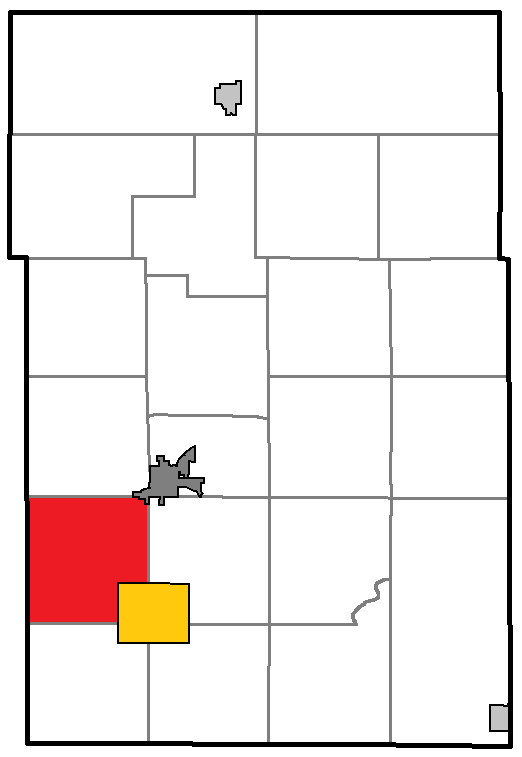
- Location of Bashaw, within Washburn County
- Coordinates: 45°46′58″N 91°58′11″W
- Country: United States
- State: Wisconsin
- County: Washburn

Area
  - Total: 33.9 sq mi (87.8 km^{2})
  - Land: 33.5 sq mi (86.8 km^{2})
  - Water: 0.39 sq mi (1.0 km^{2})
- Elevation: 1,089 ft (332 m)

Population (2020)
  - Total: 1,079
  - Density: 32.2/sq mi (12.4/km^{2})
- Time zone: UTC-6 (Central (CST))
  - Summer (DST): UTC-5 (CDT)
- Area codes: 715 & 534
- FIPS code: 55-05125
- GNIS feature ID: 1582760
- Website: https://www.townofbashaw.org/

Bashaw is a town in Washburn County, Wisconsin, United States. The population was 1,079 at the 2020 census.

== Geography ==
According to the United States Census Bureau, the town has a total area of 33.9 square miles (87.8 km^{2}), of which 33.5 square miles (86.8 km^{2}) is land and 0.4 square mile (1.0 km^{2}) (1.09%) is water.

== Demographics ==
As of the census of 2000, there were 921 people, 339 households, and 267 families residing in the town. The population density was 27.5 people per square mile (10.6/km^{2}). There were 387 housing units at an average density of 11.5 per square mile (4.5/km^{2}). The racial makeup of the town was 98.15% White, 0.22% African American, 0.11% Native American, 0.43% Asian, and 1.09% from two or more races. Hispanic or Latino of any race were 0.43% of the population.

There were 339 households, out of which 34.2% had children under the age of 18 living with them, 73.5% were married couples living together, 3.2% had a female householder with no husband present, and 21.2% were non-families. 17.1% of all households were made up of individuals, and 6.8% had someone living alone who was 65 years of age or older. The average household size was 2.72 and the average family size was 3.10.

In the town, the population was spread out, with 27.1% under the age of 18, 6.5% from 18 to 24, 27.4% from 25 to 44, 25.6% from 45 to 64, and 13.4% who were 65 years of age or older. The median age was 41 years. For every 100 females, there were 105.6 males. For every 100 females age 18 and over, there were 106.5 males.

The median income for a household in the town was $43,500, and the median income for a family was $47,014. Males had a median income of $31,923 versus $21,667 for females. The per capita income for the town was $16,982. About 7.5% of families and 8.8% of the population were below the poverty line, including 10.2% of those under age 18 and 13.7% of those age 65 or over.
