= Sarona, Wisconsin =

Town in Wisconsin, United States

- Town
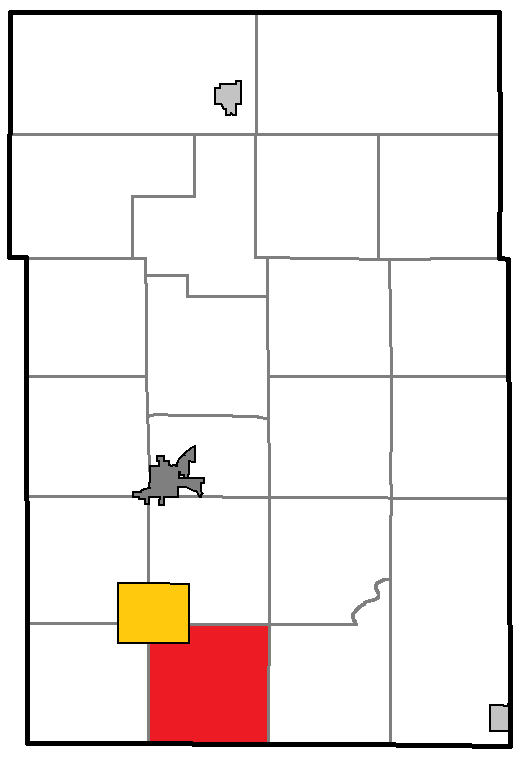
- Location of Sarona, within Washburn County
- Coordinates: 45°41′23″N 91°49′54″W
- Country: United States
- State: Wisconsin
- County: Washburn

Area
  - Total: 33.3 sq mi (86.3 km^{2})
  - Land: 31.9 sq mi (82.7 km^{2})
  - Water: 1.4 sq mi (3.7 km^{2})
- Elevation: 1,322 ft (403 m)

Population (2020)
  - Total: 419
  - Density: 13.1/sq mi (5.07/km^{2})
- Time zone: UTC-6 (Central (CST))
  - Summer (DST): UTC-5 (CDT)
- Area codes: 715 & 534
- FIPS code: 55-71637
- GNIS feature ID: 1584101

Sarona is a town in Washburn County, Wisconsin, United States. The population was 419 at the 2020 census. The unincorporated community of Sarona is located in the town.

== Geography ==
According to the United States Census Bureau, the town has a total area of 33.3 square miles (86.3 km^{2}), of which 31.9 square miles (82.7 km^{2}) is land and 1.4 square miles (3.7 km^{2}) (4.23%) is water.

== Demographics ==
As of the census of 2000, there were 382 people, 165 households, and 103 families residing in the town. The population density was 12.0 people per square mile (4.6/km^{2}). There were 263 housing units at an average density of 8.2 per square mile (3.2/km^{2}). The racial makeup of the town was 96.34% White, 0.26% Native American, 0.26% Asian, 0.26% Pacific Islander, and 2.88% from two or more races. Hispanic or Latino of any race were 0.52% of the population.

There were 165 households, out of which 27.9% had children under the age of 18 living with them, 50.9% were married couples living together, 5.5% had a female householder with no husband present, and 37.0% were non-families. 31.5% of all households were made up of individuals, and 15.2% had someone living alone who was 65 years of age or older. The average household size was 2.32 and the average family size was 2.93.

In the town, the population was spread out, with 24.3% under the age of 18, 7.1% from 18 to 24, 26.7% from 25 to 44, 26.2% from 45 to 64, and 15.7% who were 65 years of age or older. The median age was 41 years. For every 100 females, there were 114.6 males. For every 100 females age 18 and over, there were 110.9 males.

The median income for a household in the town was $30,357, and the median income for a family was $38,750. Males had a median income of $27,321 versus $20,833 for females. The per capita income for the town was $19,194. About 9.1% of families and 12.3% of the population were below the poverty line, including 23.4% of those under age 18 and 10.0% of those age 65 or over.
