= Shell Lake Municipal Airport =

Airport in Wisconsin, United States

- IATA: none; ICAO: KSSQ; FAA LID: SSQ

Summary
- Airport type: Public
- Owner: City of Shell Lake
- Serves: Shell Lake, Wisconsin
- Time zone: CST (UTC−06:00)
  - Summer (DST): CDT (UTC−05:00)
- Elevation AMSL: 1,233 ft (376 m)
- Coordinates: 45°43′53″N 091°55′14″W

Map
- Location of airport in Wisconsin SSQ (the United States)

Runways
Direction	Length		Surface
Direction	ft	m	Surface
14/32	3,711	1,131	Asphalt

Statistics
- Aircraft operations (2021): 12,600
- Based aircraft (2024): 14
- Source: Federal Aviation Administration

Shell Lake Municipal Airport (ICAO: KSSQ, FAA LID: SSQ) is a city owned public use airport located one nautical mile (2 km) southeast of the central business district of Shell Lake, a city in Washburn County, Wisconsin, United States. It is included in the Federal Aviation Administration (FAA) National Plan of Integrated Airport Systems for 2025–2029, in which it is categorized as a basic general aviation facility.

Although most U.S. airports use the same three-letter location identifier for the FAA and IATA, this airport is assigned SSQ by the FAA but has no designation from the IATA (which assigned SSQ to La Sarre Airport in La Sarre, Quebec, Canada). The airport's ICAO identifier is KSSQ.

== Facilities and aircraft ==
Shell Lake Municipal Airport covers an area of 132 acres (53 ha) at an elevation of 1,233 feet (376 m) above mean sea level. It has one runway designated 14/32 with an asphalt surface measuring 3,711 by 75 feet (1,131 x 23 m), with approved GPS approaches.

For the 12-month period ending September 23, 2021, the airport had 12,600 aircraft operations, an average of 35 per day: 95% general aviation, 4% air taxi and 1% military. In July 2024, there were 14 aircraft based at this airport: all 14 single-engine.

== See also ==
- List of airports in Wisconsin
