= Madge, Wisconsin =

Town in Wisconsin, United States

- Town
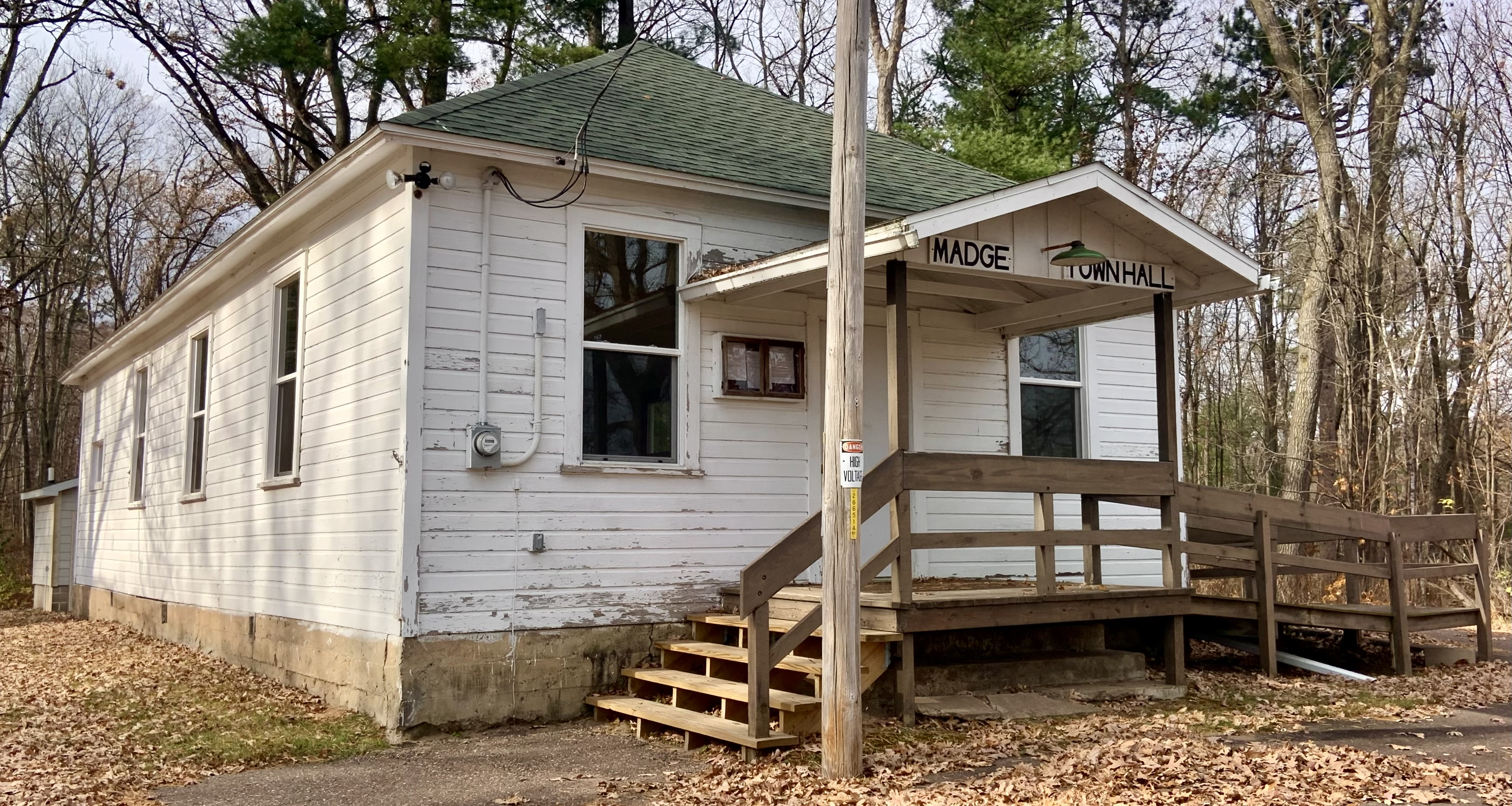
- Town hall

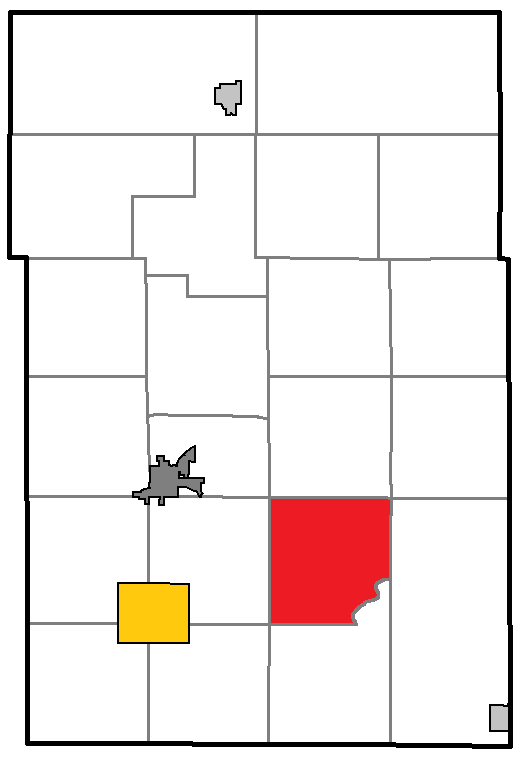
- Location of Madge, within Washburn County
- Coordinates: 45°46′10″N 91°42′48″W
- Country: United States
- State: Wisconsin
- County: Washburn

Area
  - Total: 34.1 sq mi (88.2 km^{2})
  - Land: 32.0 sq mi (82.8 km^{2})
  - Water: 2.1 sq mi (5.4 km^{2})
- Elevation: 1,210 ft (370 m)

Population (2020)
  - Total: 532
  - Density: 16.6/sq mi (6.43/km^{2})
- Time zone: UTC-6 (Central (CST))
  - Summer (DST): UTC-5 (CDT)
- Area codes: 715 & 534
- FIPS code: 55-47025
- GNIS feature ID: 1583624
- Website: http://www.townofmadge.com

Madge is a town in Washburn County, Wisconsin, United States. The population was 532 at the 2020 census.

== Geography ==
According to the United States Census Bureau, the town has a total area of 34.1 square miles (88.5 km^{2}), of which 31.4 square miles (81.3 km^{2}) is land and 2.8 square miles (7.2 km^{2}) (8.1%) is water.

== Demographics ==
As of the census of 2000, there were 454 people, 202 households, and 152 families residing in the town. The population density was 14.2 people per square mile (5.5/km^{2}). There were 410 housing units at an average density of 12.8 per square mile (4.9/km^{2}). The racial makeup of the town was 99.56% White, 0.22% Native American and 0.22% Asian. Hispanic or Latino of any race were 0.66% of the population.

There were 202 households, out of which 16.3% had children under the age of 18 living with them, 70.3% were married couples living together, 3.0% had a female householder with no husband present, and 24.3% were non-families. 19.3% of all households were made up of individuals, and 8.4% had someone living alone who was 65 years of age or older. The average household size was 2.24 and the average family size was 2.56.

In the town, the population was spread out, with 15.2% under the age of 18, 2.9% from 18 to 24, 20.9% from 25 to 44, 38.8% from 45 to 64, and 22.2% who were 65 years of age or older. The median age was 52 years. For every 100 females, there were 102.7 males. For every 100 females age 18 and over, there were 107.0 males.

The median income for a household in the town was $36,667, and the median income for a family was $39,531. Males had a median income of $27,639 versus $19,375 for females. The per capita income for the town was $28,602. About 7.6% of families and 9.1% of the population were below the poverty line, including 7.4% of those under age 18 and 1.8% of those age 65 or over.
