= Beaver Brook, Wisconsin =

Town in Wisconsin, United States

- Town
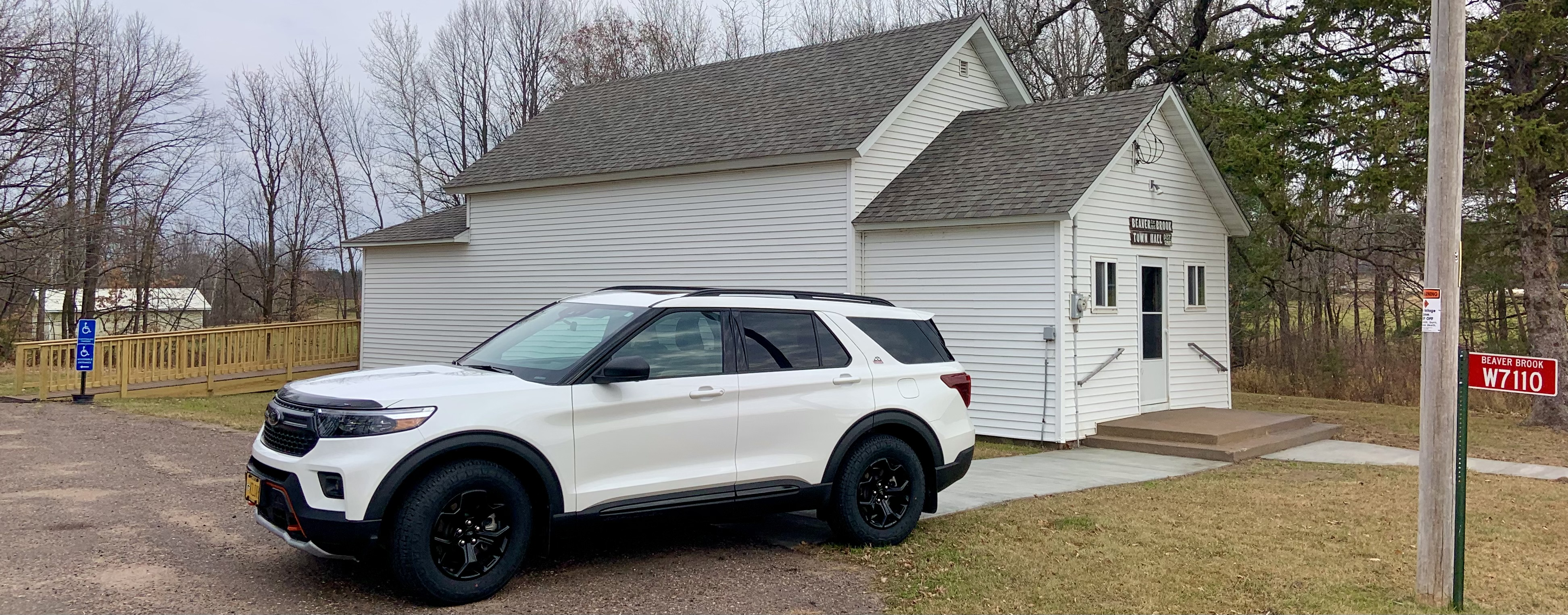
- Town hall

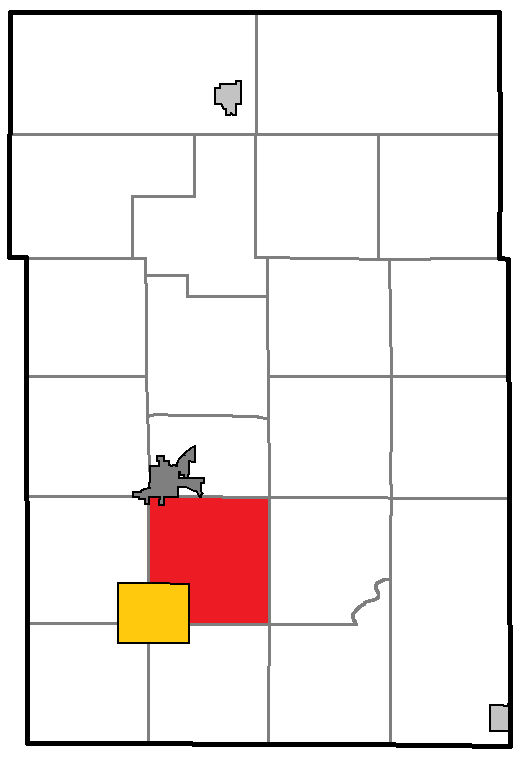
- Location of Beaver Brook, within Washburn County
- Coordinates: 45°46′23″N 91°50′30″W
- Country: United States
- State: Wisconsin
- County: Washburn

Area
  - Total: 32.9 sq mi (85.3 km^{2})
  - Land: 32.4 sq mi (84.0 km^{2})
  - Water: 0.46 sq mi (1.2 km^{2})
- Elevation: 1,184 ft (361 m)

Population (2020)
  - Total: 795
  - Density: 24.5/sq mi (9.46/km^{2})
- Time zone: UTC-6 (Central (CST))
  - Summer (DST): UTC-5 (CDT)
- Area codes: 715 & 534
- FIPS code: 55-05875
- GNIS feature ID: 1582776

Beaver Brook is a town in Washburn County, Wisconsin, United States. The population was 795 at the 2020 census. The unincorporated communities of Beaver Brook and Chicago Junction are located in the town.

== Geography ==
According to the United States Census Bureau, the town has a total area of 32.9 square miles (85.3 km^{2}), of which 32.4 square miles (84.0 km^{2}) is land and 0.5 square mile (1.2 km^{2}) (1.46%) is water.

== Demographics ==
As of the census of 2000, there were 643 people, 253 households, and 191 families residing in the town. The population density was 19.8 people per square mile (7.7/km^{2}). There were 280 housing units at an average density of 8.6 per square mile (3.3/km^{2}). The racial makeup of the town was 98.29% White, 1.09% Native American, 0.16% from other races, and 0.47% from two or more races. Hispanic or Latino of any race were 0.47% of the population.

There were 253 households, out of which 32.4% had children under the age of 18 living with them, 64.0% were married couples living together, 5.9% had a female householder with no husband present, and 24.5% were non-families. 20.6% of all households were made up of individuals, and 8.3% had someone living alone who was 65 years of age or older. The average household size was 2.54 and the average family size was 2.92.

In the town, the population was spread out, with 25.3% under the age of 18, 6.1% from 18 to 24, 26.6% from 25 to 44, 29.2% from 45 to 64, and 12.8% who were 65 years of age or older. The median age was 40 years. For every 100 females, there were 112.2 males. For every 100 females age 18 and over, there were 105.1 males.

The median income for a household in the town was $40,156, and the median income for a family was $45,179. Males had a median income of $31,458 versus $22,222 for females. The per capita income for the town was $16,797. About 6.9% of families and 8.8% of the population were below the poverty line, including 10.8% of those under age 18 and 6.6% of those age 65 or over.
