= Trego, Wisconsin =

Town in Wisconsin, United States

- Town
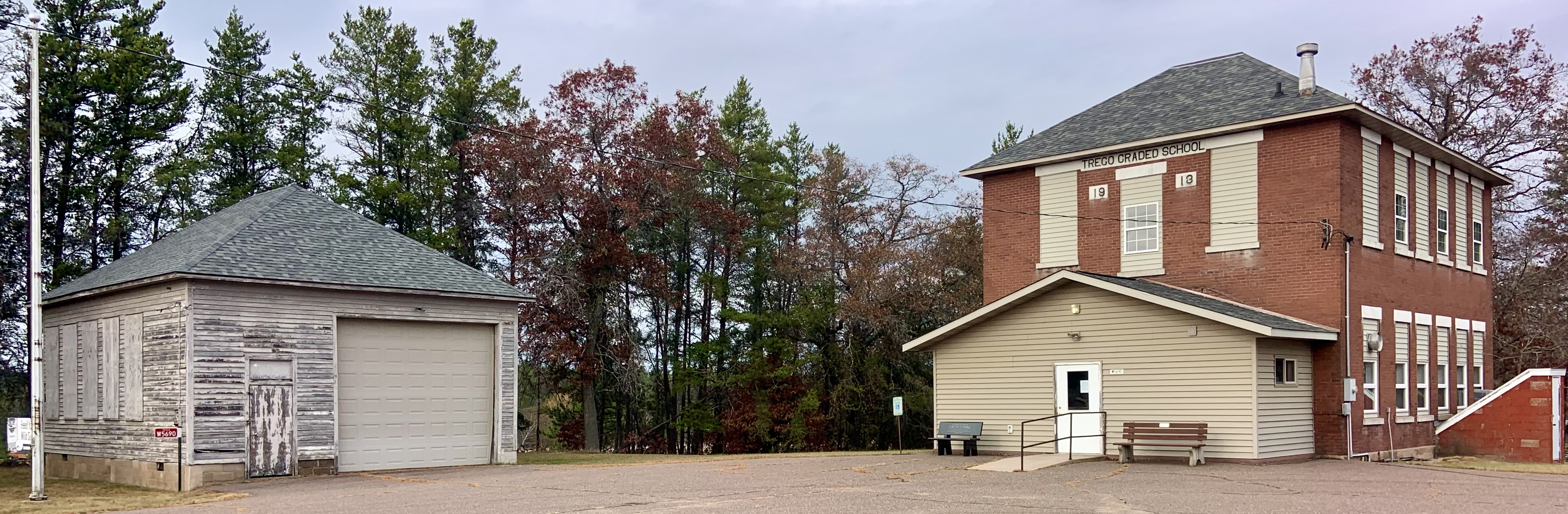
- Town hall

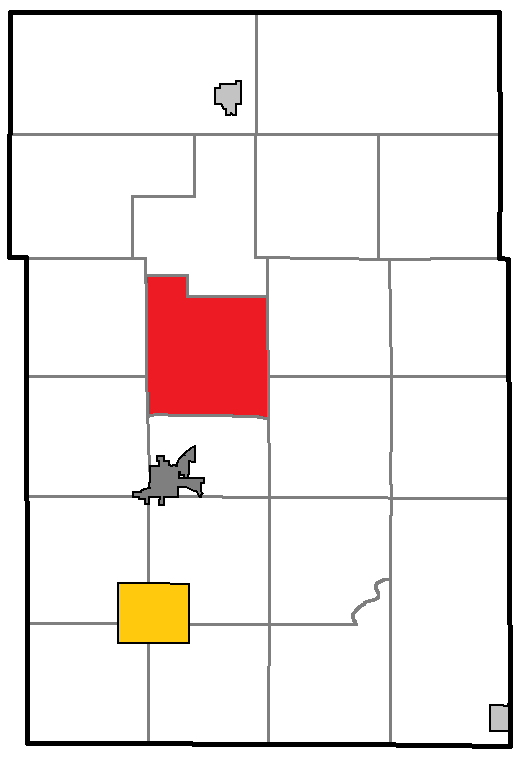
- Location of Trego, within Washburn County
- Coordinates: 45°54′48″N 91°49′58″W
- Country: United States
- State: Wisconsin
- County: Washburn

Area
  - Total: 36.8 sq mi (95.2 km^{2})
  - Land: 35.9 sq mi (93.1 km^{2})
  - Water: 0.85 sq mi (2.2 km^{2})
- Elevation: 1,043 ft (318 m)

Population (2020)
  - Total: 908
  - Density: 25.3/sq mi (9.75/km^{2})
- Time zone: UTC-6 (Central (CST))
  - Summer (DST): UTC-5 (CDT)
- Area codes: 715 and 534
- FIPS code: 55-80450
- GNIS feature ID: 1584289
- Website: https://townoftregowi.com/

Trego is a town in Washburn County, Wisconsin, United States. The population was 908 at the time of the 2020 census. The census-designated place of Trego is located in the town.

Trego is located at the junction of U.S. routes 53 and 63, 6 miles (9.7 km) north-northeast of Spooner. Trego has a post office with ZIP code 54888.

== Geography ==
According to the United States Census Bureau, the town has a total area of 36.8 square miles (95 km^{2}), of which 35.9 square miles (93.1 km^{2}) is land and 0.8 square miles (2.2 km^{2}) (2.28%) is water.

== Demographics ==
As of the census of 2000, there were 885 people, 347 households, and 242 families residing in the town. The population density was 24.6 people per square mile (9.5/km^{2}). There were 528 housing units at an average density of 14.7 per square mile (5.7/km^{2}). The racial makeup of the town was 96.95% White, 0.11% African American, 1.47% Native American, 0.23% Asian, 0.11% Pacific Islander, and 1.13% from two or more races. Hispanic or Latino people of any race were 0.23% of the population.

There were 347 households, out of which 32.0% had children under the age of 18 living with them, 61.4% were married couples living together, 4.6% had a female householder with no husband present, and 30.0% were non-families. 23.6% of all households were made up of individuals, and 11.0% had someone living alone who was 65 years of age or older. The average household size was 2.55, and the average family size was 3.02.

In the town, the population was spread out, with 27.1% under the age of 18, 5.5% from 18 to 24, 23.8% from 25 to 44, 30.2% from 45 to 64, and 13.3% who were 65 years of age or older. The median age was 40 years. For every 100 females, there were 100.2 males. For every 100 females age 18 and over, there were 101.6 males.

The 2000 median income for a household in the town was $35,069, and the median income for a family was $39,000. Males had a median income of $30,250 versus $23,125 for females. The per capita income for the town was $16,000. About 13.4% of families and 15.1% of the population were below the poverty line, including 18.3% of those under age 18 and 11.2% of those age 65 or over.
