= Superior School District =

School district in Wisconsin, United States

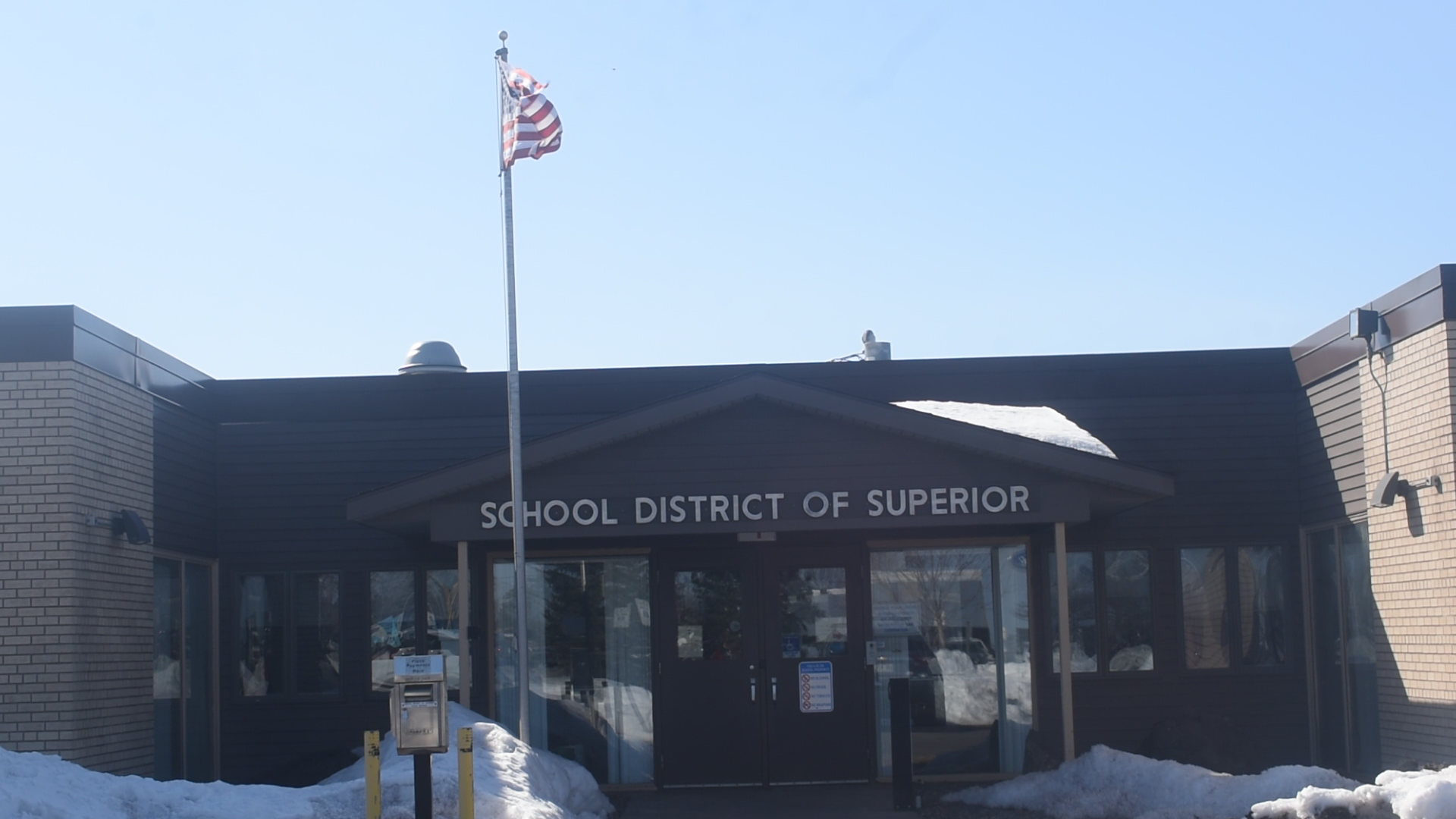
Superior School District Building in Superior, Wisconsin.

The School District of Superior is a school district in super Wisconsin, United States that serves students in the city of Superior; the towns of Oakland, Parkland, Summit, and Superior; and the villages of Oliver and Superior. The district also provides services to some students not living as a part of open enrollment. The School District of Superior is the 23rd largest school district in Wisconsin and one of the largest employers in Douglas County. The Superintendent of Schools is Amy Starzecki.

The district is divided into departments: Buildings and Grounds, Business Office, Curriculum/Instruction, Food Service, Health, Indian Education, Information Technology, Special Education, Student Services, Superintendent, and Transportation departments. It operates in accordance with local, state, and federal laws and the bylaws of the School Board of the School District of Superior.

The School District provides a universally free breakfast to elementary and middle school students. It has a random drug testing policy that requires students who are in extra-curricular activities or parking on school grounds to enter their names into a pool to be randomly selected to complete a urine drug test. Students may also choose to become volunteer members of the drug testing pool in a program called Pledgemakers.

== Schools ==
The School District of Superior comprises one high school, one middle school, and five elementary schools, with a total enrollment of over 5,000 students. The district has 2,322 students enrolled in elementary schools, 1,027 in middle school, and 1,633 in high school. District property encompasses about 250 acres (1.0 km^{2}) The district owns a school forest in the Town of Summit that is used as an outdoor classroom. It has three classroom buildings and trails.

Elementary schools:

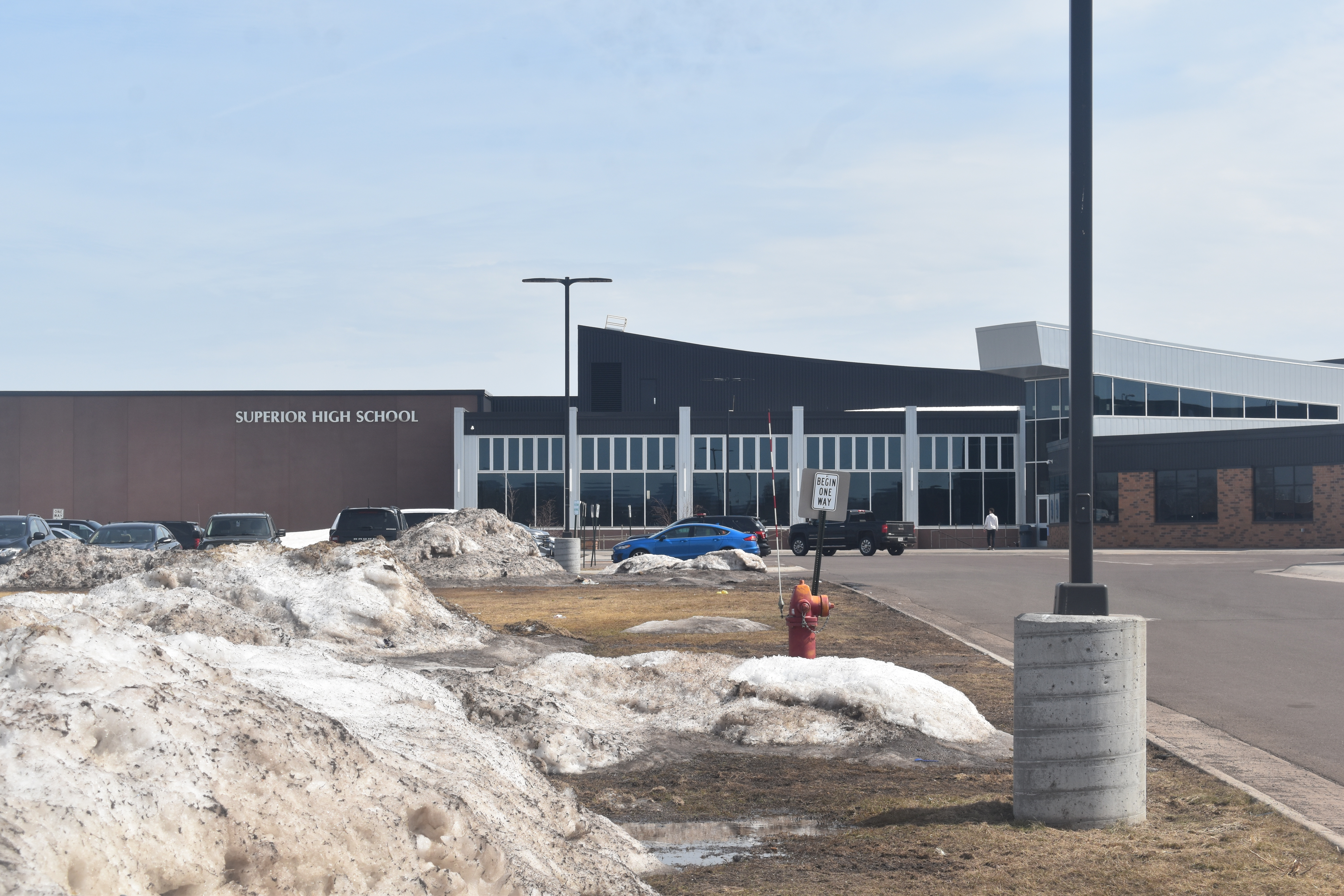
Superior High School, one of two secondary schools in Superior, Wisconsin.

- Bryant Elementary School
- Cooper Elementary School
- Four Corners Elementary School
- Great Lakes Elementary School
- Northern Lights Elementary School

Middle schools:

- Superior Middle School

High schools:

- Superior High School
