= King G. Staples =

American politician

Member of the Wisconsin State Assembly
- In office 1897

Personal details
- Born: May 26, 1851 Lee, Maine
- Died: September 21, 1910 (aged 59) Portland, Oregon

King G. Staples (May 26, 1851 – September 21, 1910) was an American businessman and Republican politician.

Born in Lee, Maine, Staples moved to Minnesota in 1855 and then moved to South Range, Wisconsin in 1884 and then to Iron River, Wisconsin in 1889. He was in the flour mill and lumbering businesses.

Staples served as treasurer of the town of Superior and as chairman of the Iron River Town Board in 1892. Staples also served on the Bayfield County Board of Supervisors and was chairman of the county board.

In 1897, Staples served in the Wisconsin State Assembly and was a Republican. In 1898 he was imprisoned for larceny. A year later, he was he was pardoned. Staples died in Portland, Oregon and was buried in Anoka, Minnesota.
