= Gordon, Wisconsin =

Gordon is the name of some places in Wisconsin in the United States:

- Gordon, Ashland County, Wisconsin, a town
- Gordon, Douglas County, Wisconsin, a town
- Gordon (CDP), Wisconsin, a census-designated place
