= Solon Springs (town), Wisconsin =

Town in Douglas County, Wisconsin

Solon Springs, Wisconsin
- Town
- Town of Solon Springs
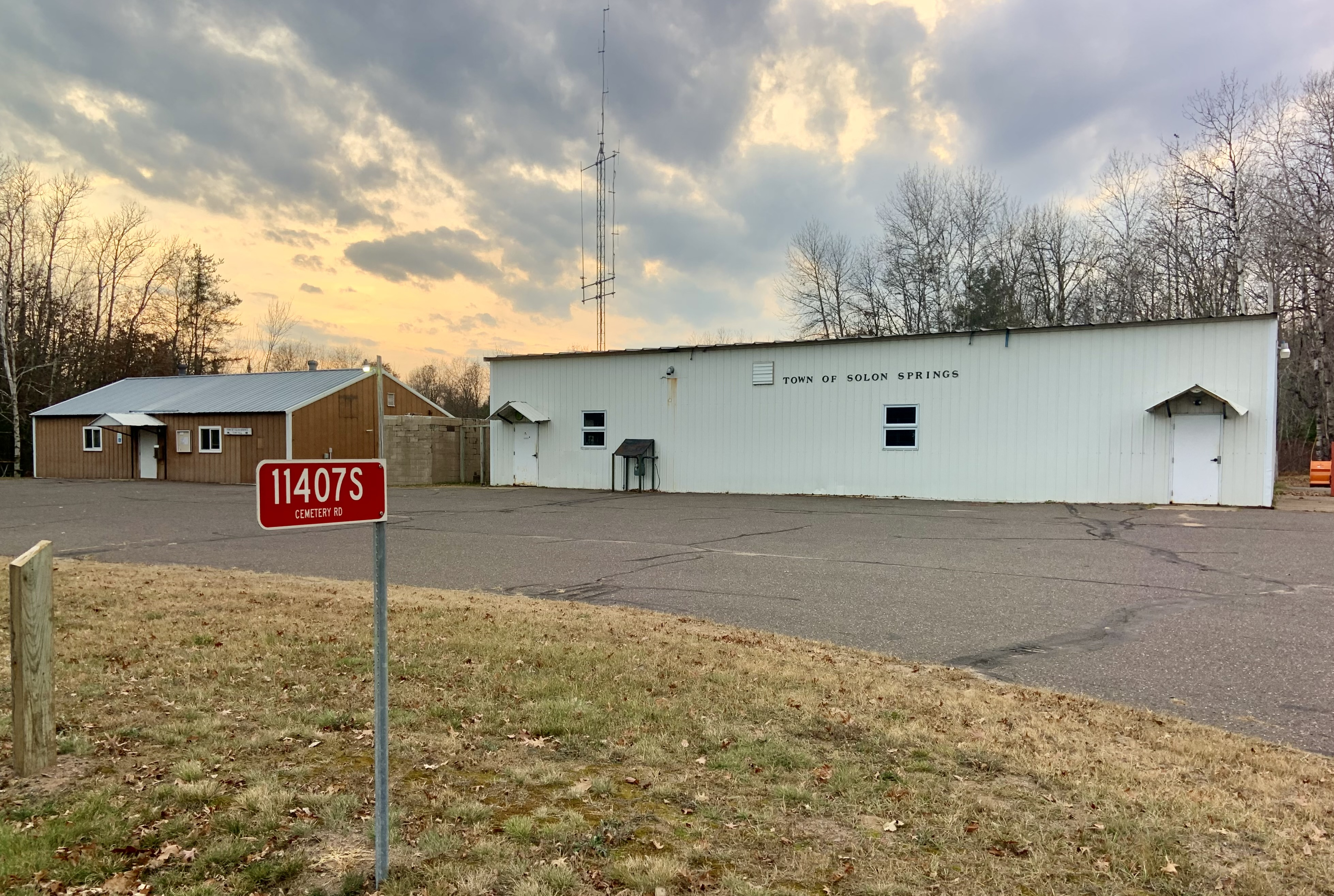
- Solon Springs Town Hall

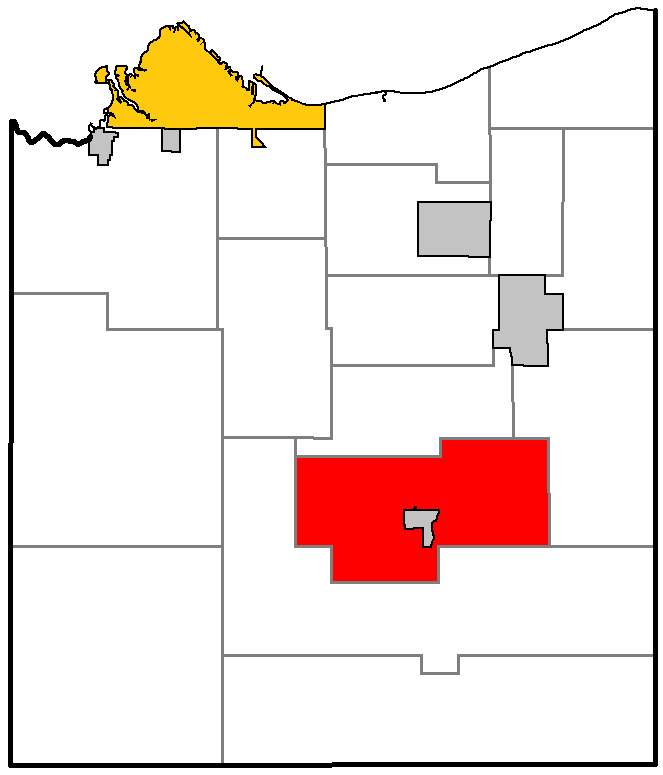
- Location of Solon Springs, within Douglas County
- Coordinates: 46°21′55″N 91°49′30″W
- Country: United States
- State: Wisconsin
- County: Washburn

Area
  - Total: 84.41 sq mi (218.6 km^{2})
  - Land: 82.69 sq mi (214.2 km^{2})
  - Water: 1.73 sq mi (4.5 km^{2})

Population (2020)
  - Total: 970
  - Density: 12/sq mi (4.5/km^{2})
- Time zone: UTC-6 (Central (CST))
  - Summer (DST): UTC-5 (CDT)
- Area code(s): 715 & 534
- GNIS feature ID: 1584172

Solon Springs is a town in Douglas County, Wisconsin, United States. As of the 2020 census, the town had a total population of 970. The Village of Solon Springs is located within the town. The unincorporated community of Sauntry is also located in the town.

== Geography ==
According to the United States Census Bureau, the town has a total area of 84.5 square miles (218.9 km^{2}), of which 83.0 square miles (215.0 km^{2}) is land and 1.5 square miles (3.8 km^{2}) (1.75%) is water.

Solon Springs is located eight miles north of Gordon, 63 miles west southwest of the city of Ashland and 32 miles southeast of the city of Superior. Solon Springs is located on the west shoreline of the Upper Saint Croix Lake, the headwaters of the St. Croix River.

== Transportation ==
U.S. Highway 53, Business 53, and County Hwy A serve as the main routes in the community.

== Demographics ==
As of the census of 2000, there were 807 people, 334 households, and 241 families residing in the town. The population density was 9.7 people per square mile (3.8/km^{2}). There were 477 housing units at an average density of 5.7 per square mile (2.2/km^{2}). The racial makeup of the town was 97.77% White, 0.25% Black or African American, 0.99% Native American, 0.12% Asian, and 0.87% from two or more races. 0.25% of the population were Hispanic or Latino of any race.

There were 334 households, out of which 27.5% had children under the age of 18 living with them, 63.5% were married couples living together, 6.9% had a female householder with no husband present, and 27.8% were non-families. 23.4% of all households were made up of individuals, and 7.2% had someone living alone who was 65 years of age or older. The average household size was 2.42 and the average family size was 2.85.

In the town, the population was spread out, with 23.7% under the age of 18, 6.3% from 18 to 24, 26.0% from 25 to 44, 27.8% from 45 to 64, and 16.2% who were 65 years of age or older. The median age was 41 years. For every 100 females, there were 115.2 males. For every 100 females age 18 and over, there were 107.4 males.

The median income for a household in the town was $42,300, and the median income for a family was $45,156. Males had a median income of $39,375 versus $20,208 for females. The per capita income for the town was $19,561. About 4.9% of families and 9.0% of the population were below the poverty line, including 14.1% of those under age 18 and 3.3% of those age 65 or over.
