= Rockmont =

Rockmont may refer to:

- Rockmont, Wisconsin, an unincorporated community, United States
- Camp Rockmont for Boys, North Carolina, United States
