= Dobie, Wisconsin =

Dobie is the name of some places in the U.S. state of Wisconsin:

- Dobie, Barron County, Wisconsin, an unincorporated community
- Dobie, Douglas County, Wisconsin, an unincorporated community
