= Bennett (community), Wisconsin =

Bennett, Wisconsin
- Unincorporated community
- Location within Wisconsin Location within the United States
- Coordinates: 46°26′55″N 91°51′13″W
- Country: United States
- State: Wisconsin
- County: Douglas
- Town: Bennett
- Elevation: 1,201 ft (366 m)
- Time zone: UTC-6 (Central (CST))
  - Summer (DST): UTC-5 (CDT)
- Area codes: 715 and 534
- GNIS feature ID: 1561562

Bennett is an unincorporated community in the town of Bennett, Douglas County, Wisconsin, United States.

The community is located 7 miles (11 km) north-northwest of Solon Springs; and 27 miles southeast of the city of Superior.

U.S. Highway 53, County Road L and County Road E are three of the main routes in the community.

== History ==
Bennett was named for Richard Bennett, who built a siding to his business. A post office was established as Bennett Siding in 1892, and the name was changed to Bennett in 1899; the post office closed in 1984.
