= Wascott (community), Wisconsin =

Wascott, Wisconsin
- Unincorporated community
- Location within Wisconsin Location within the United States
- Coordinates: 46°10′21″N 91°47′54″W
- Country: United States
- State: Wisconsin
- County: Douglas
- Town: Wascott
- Elevation: 1,093 ft (333 m)
- Time zone: UTC-6 (Central (CST))
  - Summer (DST): UTC-5 (CDT)
- Area codes: 715 and 534
- GNIS feature ID: 1576227

Wascott is an unincorporated community in the town of Wascott, Douglas County, Wisconsin, United States.

The community is located 12.5 miles south of Solon Springs; and 45 miles southeast of the city of Superior.

U.S. Highway 53 and County Road T are two of the main routes in the community.

== History ==
A post office called Wascott was established in 1902, and remained in operation until it was discontinued in 1995. The community was named for W. A. Scott, a railroad official.
