= Boylston =

Boylston may refer to the following:

== Places ==
=== Canada ===
- Boylston, Nova Scotia

=== United States ===
- Boylston, Massachusetts
- Boylston, New York
- Boylston, Wisconsin
- Boylston Junction, Wisconsin
- Boylston Street in Boston, Massachusetts
- Boylston (MBTA station), a subway station in Boston

== Other uses ==
- Helen Dore Boylston (1895–1984), author of the popular "Sue Barton" nurse series
- Isabella Boylston (born 1986), American ballet dancer
- Zabdiel Boylston (1679–1766), American physician

== See also ==
- Boylestone, a village in Derbyshire county, England
