= Chaffey, Wisconsin =

- Unincorporated community
- Location within Wisconsin Location within the United States
- Coordinates: 46°23′54″N 92°09′49″W
- Country: United States
- State: Wisconsin
- County: Douglas
- Town: Summit
- Elevation: 1,280 ft (390 m)
- Time zone: UTC-6 (Central (CST))
  - Summer (DST): UTC-5 (CDT)
- Area codes: 715 and 534
- GNIS feature ID: 1577194

Chaffey is an unincorporated community located in the town of Summit, Douglas County, Wisconsin, United States.

Chaffey is located south of the city of Superior, and west of the village of Solon Springs. Wisconsin Highway 35 serves as a main route through the community.

== History ==
The community was named for its first postmaster, John Chaffey, in October 1899.
