= Parkland (community), Wisconsin =

Parkland, Wisconsin
- Unincorporated community
- Location within Wisconsin Location within the United States
- Coordinates: 46°38′52″N 91°59′52″W
- Country: United States
- State: Wisconsin
- County: Douglas
- Town: Parkland
- Elevation: 689 ft (210 m)
- Time zone: UTC-6 (Central (CST))
  - Summer (DST): UTC-5 (CDT)
- Area codes: 715 and 534
- GNIS feature ID: 1571055

Parkland is an unincorporated community in the town of Parkland, Douglas County, Wisconsin, United States.

The community is located 8 miles (13 km) southeast of the city of Superior at the junction of County Roads E and Z. Nearby is the junction of Wisconsin Highway 13 and U.S. Highways 2 / 53 (co-signed).

The Canadian National Railway runs through the community.

== Education ==
The Superior School District serves the community, with the Lake Superior Elementary School being directly north of Parkland.
