= Summit, Douglas County, Wisconsin =

Summit
- Town
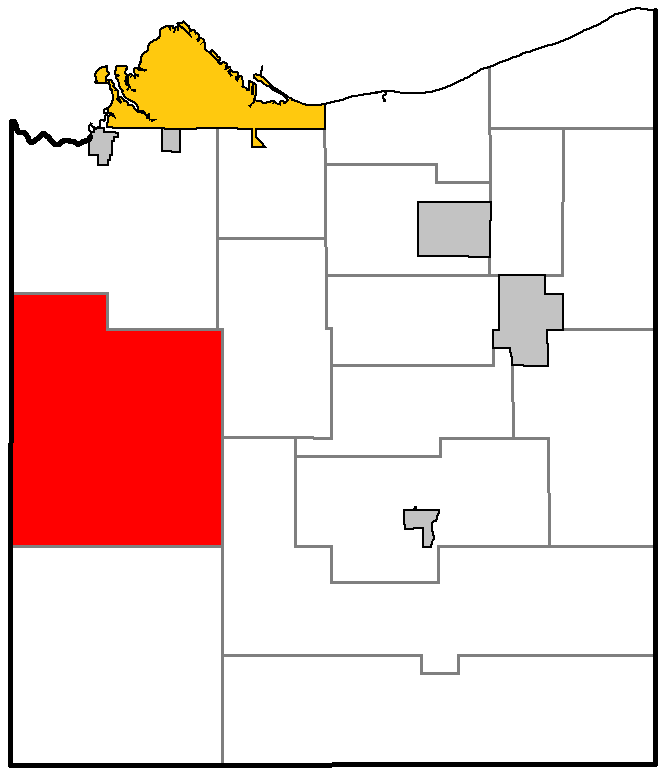
- Location of Summit, within Douglas County
- Coordinates: 46°27′15″N 92°11′29″W
- Country: United States
- State: Wisconsin
- County: Douglas

Area
  - Total: 147.6 sq mi (382.2 km^{2})
  - Land: 146.6 sq mi (379.7 km^{2})
  - Water: 0.97 sq mi (2.5 km^{2})
- Elevation: 1,201 ft (366 m)

Population (2020)
  - Total: 1,030
  - Density: 7.03/sq mi (2.71/km^{2})
- Time zone: UTC-6 (Central (CST))
  - Summer (DST): UTC-5 (CDT)
- ZIP codes: 54836
- Area codes: 715 and 534
- FIPS code: 55-78275
- GNIS feature ID: 1584247
- Website: https://www.townofsummitdc.com/home

Summit is a town in Douglas County, Wisconsin, United States. The population was 1,030 in the 2020 census. The unincorporated communities of Chaffey, Foxboro, and Patzau are located in the town.

== Transportation ==
Wisconsin Highway 35, County Highway B, County Highway A, and County Highway BB serve as a main routes in the community.

== Geography ==
According to the United States Census Bureau, the town has a total area of 147.6 square miles (382.2 km^{2}), of which 146.6 square miles (379.7 km^{2}) is land and 1.0 square mile (2.5 km^{2}) (0.65%) is water.

The town of Summit is located 22 miles south of the city of Superior.

== Demographics ==
As of the census of 2000, there were 1,042 people, 418 households, and 300 families residing in the town. The population density was 7.1 people per square mile (2.7/km^{2}). There were 561 housing units at an average density of 3.8 per square mile (1.5/km^{2}). The racial makeup of the town was 98.37% White, 0.29% Native American, 0.19% Asian, and 1.15% from two or more races. Hispanic or Latino of any race were 0.10% of the population.

There were 418 households, out of which 31.3% had children under the age of 18 living with them, 62.7% were married couples living together, 4.5% had a female householder with no husband present, and 28.0% were non-families. 23.4% of all households were made up of individuals, and 5.5% had someone living alone who was 65 years of age or older. The average household size was 2.49 and the average family size was 2.93.

In the town, the population was spread out, with 24.7% under the age of 18, 5.6% from 18 to 24, 31.8% from 25 to 44, 27.3% from 45 to 64, and 10.7% who were 65 years of age or older. The median age was 39 years. For every 100 females, there were 119.4 males. For every 100 females age 18 and over, there were 115.1 males.

The median income for a household in the town was $42,386, and the median income for a family was $46,771. Males had a median income of $37,422 versus $21,635 for females. The per capita income for the town was $18,275. About 5.0% of families and 7.0% of the population were below the poverty line, including 10.4% of those under age 18 and 6.6% of those age 65 or over.

== Education ==
The Superior School District serves the community. Four Corners Elementary School is the local elementary school.
