= Hawthorne (community), Wisconsin =

Hawthorne, Wisconsin
- Unincorporated community
- Location within Wisconsin Location within the United States
- Coordinates: 46°30′11″N 91°51′39″W
- Country: United States
- State: Wisconsin
- County: Douglas
- Town: Hawthorne
- Elevation: 1,165 ft (355 m)
- Time zone: UTC-6 (Central (CST))
  - Summer (DST): UTC-5 (CDT)
- ZIP code: 54842
- Area codes: 715 and 534
- GNIS feature ID: 1566166

Hawthorne is an unincorporated community, located in the town of Hawthorne, Douglas County, Wisconsin, United States.

County Road B serves as a main route in the community. U.S. Highway 53 is nearby.

The community is located 7.5 miles west of Lake Nebagamon; and 22 miles southeast of the city of Superior.

Hawthorne has a post office with ZIP code 54842.

== History ==
Hawthorne was founded in 1885. It was named for W. B. Hawthorne, a lumberman. A post office has been in operation in Hawthorne since 1885.
