= Oakland, Douglas County, Wisconsin =

Oakland, Wisconsin
- Town
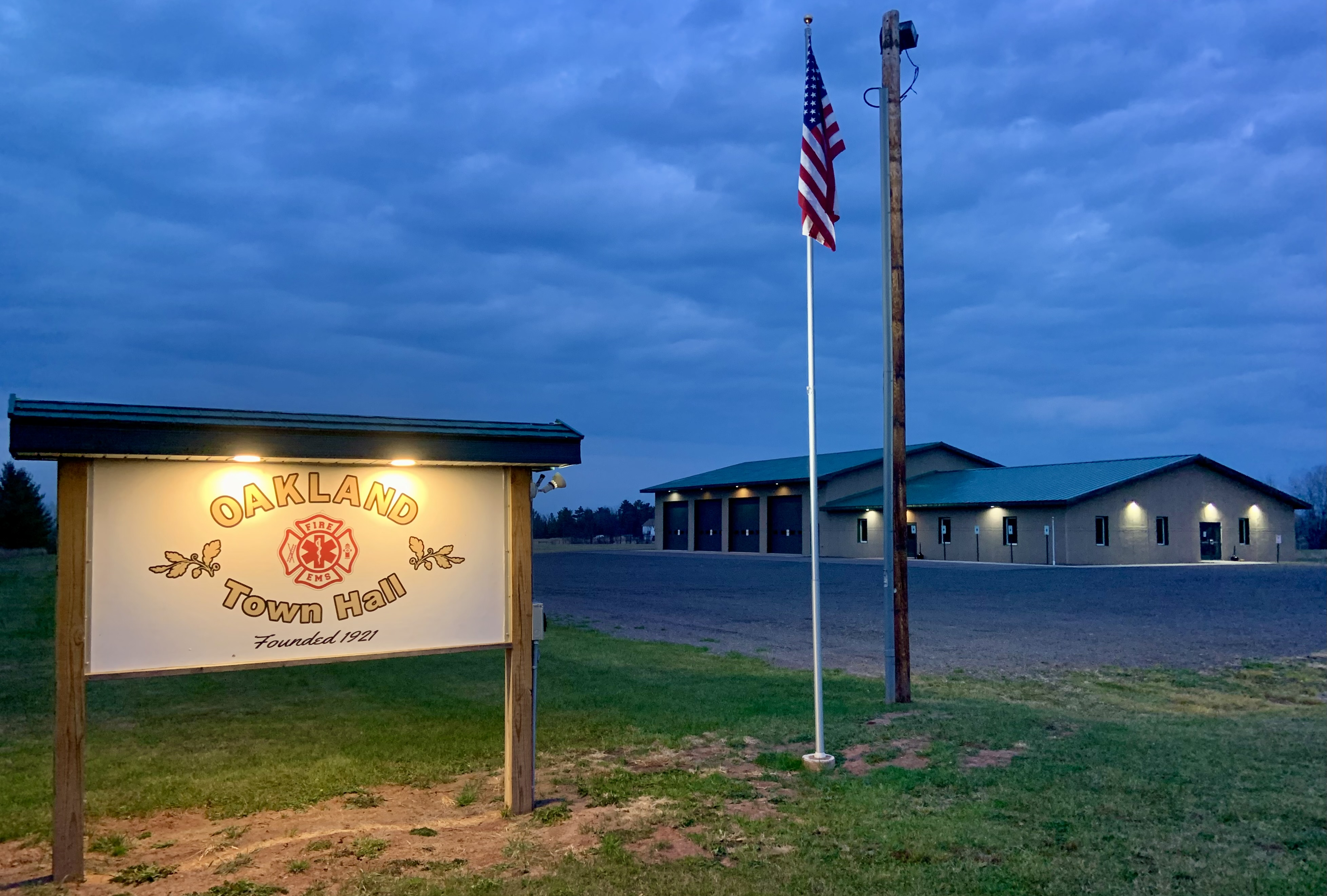
- Town hall

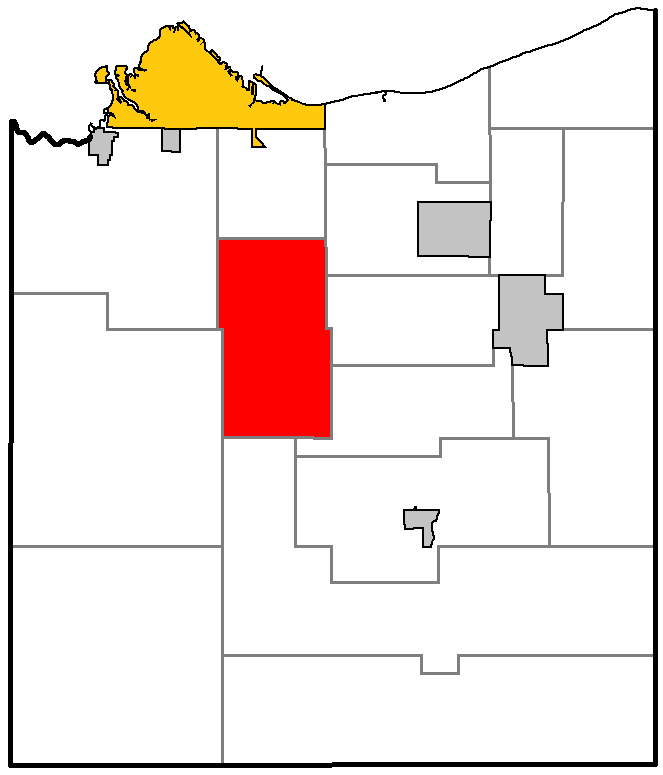
- Location of Oakland, within Douglas County
- Coordinates: 46°30′49″N 91°59′32″W
- Country: United States
- State: Wisconsin
- County: Douglas

Area
  - Total: 65.0 sq mi (168.3 km^{2})
  - Land: 63.9 sq mi (165.5 km^{2})
  - Water: 1.0 sq mi (2.7 km^{2})
- Elevation: 1,227 ft (374 m)

Population (2020)
  - Total: 1,170
  - Density: 18.3/sq mi (7.07/km^{2})
- Time zone: UTC-6 (Central (CST))
  - Summer (DST): UTC-5 (CDT)
- Area codes: 715 and 534
- FIPS code: 55-59100
- GNIS feature ID: 1583844
- Website: www.townofoakland.net

Oakland is a town in Douglas County, Wisconsin, United States. The population was 1,170 at the 2020 census.

County Road B and County Road K are two of the main routes in the community.

Oakland is located between U.S. Highway 53 and Wisconsin Highway 35.

== Geography ==
According to the United States Census Bureau, the town has a total area of 65.0 square miles (168.3 km^{2}), of which 63.9 square miles (165.6 km^{2}) is land and 1.0 square mile (2.7 km^{2}) (1.62%) is water.

== Demographics ==
As of the census of 2000, there were 1,144 people, 425 households, and 336 families residing in the town. The population density was 17.9 people per square mile (6.9/km^{2}). There were 541 housing units at an average density of 8.5 per square mile (3.3/km^{2}). The racial makeup of the town was 97.64% White, 0.09% African American, 0.96% Native American, 0.17% Asian, and 1.14% from two or more races. Hispanic or Latino of any race were 0.52% of the population.

There were 425 households, out of which 35.3% had children under the age of 18 living with them, 67.5% were married couples living together, 7.8% had a female householder with no husband present, and 20.9% were non-families. 16.5% of all households were made up of individuals, and 6.4% had someone living alone who was 65 years of age or older. The average household size was 2.69 and the average family size was 3.03.

In the town, the population was spread out, with 25.2% under the age of 18, 7.6% from 18 to 24, 29.4% from 25 to 44, 27.4% from 45 to 64, and 10.4% who were 65 years of age or older. The median age was 40 years. For every 100 females, there were 108.4 males. For every 100 females age 18 and over, there were 109.3 males.

The median income for a household in the town was $46,528, and the median income for a family was $51,563. Males had a median income of $37,813 versus $23,646 for females. The per capita income for the town was $18,489. About 4.7% of families and 5.4% of the population were below the poverty line, including 6.2% of those under age 18 and 12.5% of those age 65 or over.

== Education ==
The Superior School District serves the Township. Four Corners Elementary School and Lake Superior Elementary School are the local elementary schools.
