= Patzau, Wisconsin =

- Unincorporated community
- Location within Wisconsin Location within the United States
- Coordinates: 46°29′29″N 92°13′15″W
- Country: United States
- State: Wisconsin
- County: Douglas
- Town: Summit
- Elevation: 1,007 ft (307 m)
- Time zone: UTC-6 (Central (CST))
  - Summer (DST): UTC-5 (CDT)
- Area codes: 715 and 534
- GNIS feature ID: 1571087

Patzau is an unincorporated community, in Douglas County, in the town of Summit, in the northwestern part of the U.S. state of Wisconsin.

County Road BB serves as a main route in the community. Wisconsin Highway 35 is nearby.

Patzau is located southwest of the city of Superior.

== History ==
The community was named after Pacov (then Patzau) in what is now the Czech Republic, by a cattle dealer from the town.

Patzau is a former railroad community. Soo Line operated a yard there in the early to mid 1900s.
