= Wentworth, Wisconsin =

- Unincorporated community
- Location within Wisconsin Location within the United States
- Coordinates: 46°36′00″N 91°50′10″W
- Country: United States
- State: Wisconsin
- County: Douglas
- Town: Amnicon
- Elevation: 938 ft (286 m)
- Time zone: UTC-6 (Central (CST))
  - Summer (DST): UTC-5 (CDT)
- Area codes: 715 and 534
- GNIS feature ID: 1576430

Wentworth is an unincorporated community, in the town of Amnicon, Douglas County, Wisconsin, United States.

The community is located 16 miles east of the city of Superior.

U.S. Highway 2 serves as a main route in the community.
