= Highland, Douglas County, Wisconsin =

Highland, Wisconsin
- Town
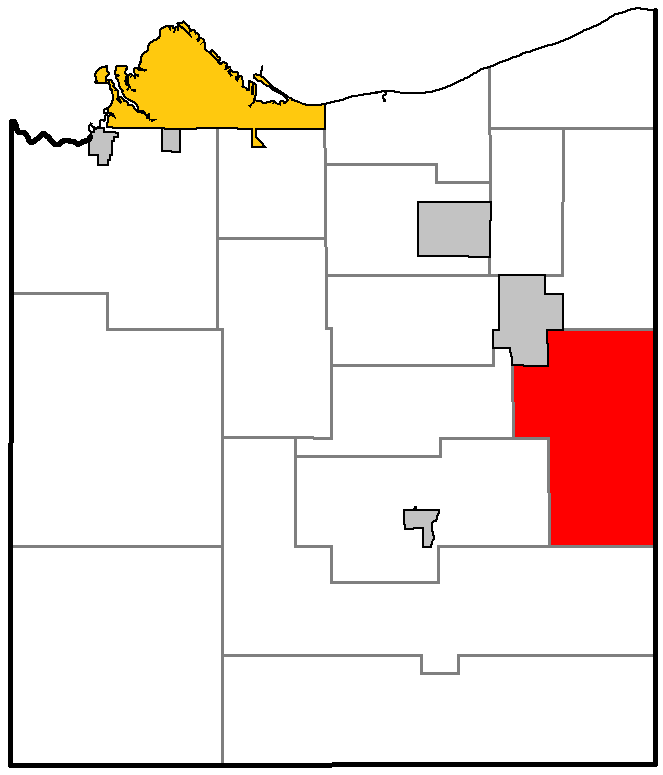
- Location of Highland, within Douglas County
- Coordinates: 46°25′21″N 91°36′13″W
- Country: United States
- State: Wisconsin
- County: Douglas

Area
  - Total: 78.1 sq mi (202.2 km^{2})
  - Land: 76.5 sq mi (198.1 km^{2})
  - Water: 1.5 sq mi (4.0 km^{2})
- Elevation: 1,217 ft (371 m)

Population (2020)
  - Total: 340
  - Density: 4.4/sq mi (1.7/km^{2})
- Time zone: UTC-6 (Central (CST))
  - Summer (DST): UTC-5 (CDT)
- Area codes: 715 and 534
- FIPS code: 55-34425
- GNIS feature ID: 1583386
- Website: https://townofhighland.wi.gov/

Highland is a town in Douglas County, Wisconsin, United States. The population was 340 at the 2020 census.

== Transportation ==
Wisconsin Highway 27 and County Road S are two of the main routes in the community.

== Geography ==
According to the United States Census Bureau, the town has a total area of 78.1 square miles (202.2 km^{2}), of which 76.5 square miles (198.1 km^{2}) is land and 1.6 square miles (4.0 km^{2}) (2.00%) is water.

Highland is located 39 miles east-southeast of the city of Superior.

The Brule River flows through the area.

== Demographics ==
At the 2000 census there were 245 people, 107 households, and 89 families in the town. The population density was 3.2 people per square mile (1.2/km^{2}). There were 169 housing units at an average density of 2.2 per square mile (0.9/km^{2}). The racial makeup of the town was 98.37% White, 0.41% Native American, 0.41% Asian and 0.82% Pacific Islander. Of the 107 households 17.8% had children under the age of 18 living with them, 72.9% were married couples living together, 5.6% had a female householder with no husband present, and 16.8% were non-families. 15.9% of households were one person and 5.6% were one person aged 65 or older. The average household size was 2.29 and the average family size was 2.43.

The age distribution was 15.1% under the age of 18, 3.7% from 18 to 24, 23.7% from 25 to 44, 33.9% from 45 to 64, and 23.7% 65 or older. The median age was 52 years. For every 100 females, there were 114.9 males. For every 100 females age 18 and over, there were 114.4 males.

The median household income was $41,071 and the median family income was $45,417. Males had a median income of $34,375 versus $26,250 for females. The per capita income for the town was $20,163. About 9.2% of families and 11.2% of the population were below the poverty line, including 20.7% of those under the age of eighteen and 3.8% of those sixty five or over.
