= Sunnyside, Wisconsin =

- Unincorporated community
- Location within Wisconsin Location within the United States
- Coordinates: 46°36′15″N 92°03′24″W
- Country: United States
- State: Wisconsin
- County: Douglas
- Town: Superior and Parkland
- Elevation: 702 ft (214 m)
- Time zone: UTC-6 (Central (CST))
  - Summer (DST): UTC-5 (CDT)
- Area codes: 715 and 534
- GNIS feature ID: 1577845

Sunnyside is an unincorporated community located in the towns of Superior, and Parkland, Douglas County, Wisconsin, United States. Sunnyside was built along the railroad, with the old depot being a house, and the tracks now an ATV trail.
