= Gordon (CDP), Wisconsin =

Census-designated place in Wisconsin, United States

Gordon, Wisconsin
- Census-designated place
- Location within Wisconsin
- Coordinates: 46°14′49″N 91°47′55″W
- Country: United States
- State: Wisconsin
- County: Douglas
- Town: Gordon

Area
  - Total: 1.856 sq mi (4.81 km^{2})
  - Land: 1.835 sq mi (4.75 km^{2})
  - Water: 0.021 sq mi (0.054 km^{2})
- Elevation: 1,033 ft (315 m)

Population (2020)
  - Total: 145
  - Density: 79.0/sq mi (30.5/km^{2})
- Time zone: UTC-6 (Central (CST))
  - Summer (DST): UTC-5 (CDT)
- ZIP code: 54838
- Area codes: 715 and 534
- GNIS feature ID: 1565674

Gordon is an unincorporated, census-designated place, located in the town of Gordon, Douglas County, Wisconsin, United States. The population was 145 as of the 2020 census, down from 176 at the 2010 census.

== History ==
A post office called Gordon was established in 1882. The community was named for Antoine Gordon, a French trader with the Indians.

== Transportation ==
U.S. Highway 53 serves as a main route in the community. Gordon is located 7.5 miles (12.1 km) south of Solon Springs; and 40 miles (64 km) southeast of the city of Superior.

== Population ==
As of the 2010 census, its population was 176.

Gordon has a post office with ZIP code 54838.
