= Hines, Wisconsin =

- Unincorporated community
- Location within Wisconsin Location within the United States
- Coordinates: 46°32′35″N 91°54′30″W
- Country: United States
- State: Wisconsin
- County: Douglas
- Town: Hawthorne
- Elevation: 1,109 ft (338 m)
- Time zone: UTC-6 (Central (CST))
  - Summer (DST): UTC-5 (CDT)
- Area codes: 715 and 534
- GNIS feature ID: 1577644

Hines is an unincorporated community located in the town of Hawthorne, Douglas County, Wisconsin, United States.

== History ==
Hines contained a post office from 1903 until 1955. The community was named for Edward Hines, a businessperson in the logging industry.

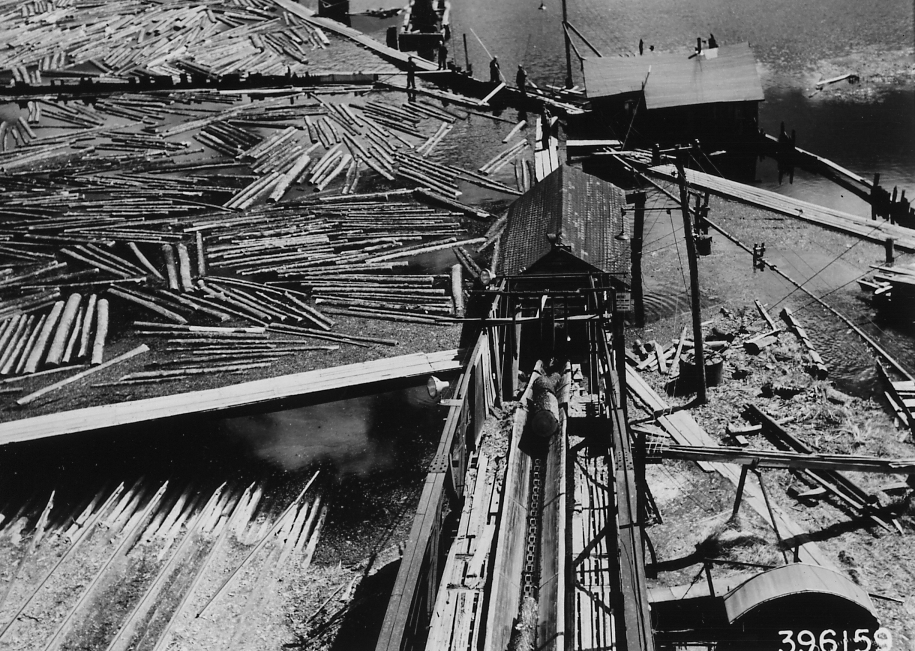
Photograph of Bull Chain at Hines - NARA - 2128652
