= Amnicon Falls, Wisconsin =

- Unincorporated community
- Location within Wisconsin Location within the United States
- Coordinates: 46°36′14″N 91°53′24″W
- Country: United States
- State: Wisconsin
- County: Douglas
- Town: Amnicon
- Elevation: 850 ft (260 m)
- Time zone: UTC-6 (Central (CST))
  - Summer (DST): UTC-5 (CDT)
- Area codes: 715 and 534
- GNIS feature ID: 1577490

Amnicon Falls is an unincorporated community located in the town of Amnicon, Douglas County, Wisconsin, United States. Amnicon Falls is located on the Amnicon River and U.S. Highway 2, 13 miles (21 km) southeast of Superior.
