= Beebe, Wisconsin =

- Unincorporated community
- Location within Wisconsin Location within the United States
- Coordinates: 46°24′26″N 91°50′22″W
- Country: United States
- State: Wisconsin
- County: Douglas
- Town: Bennett
- Elevation: 1,257 ft (383 m)
- Time zone: UTC-6 (Central (CST))
  - Summer (DST): UTC-5 (CDT)
- Area codes: 715 and 534
- GNIS feature ID: 1577510

Beebe is an unincorporated community located in the town of Bennett, Douglas County, Wisconsin, United States. The town has a post office.

The community was named for Dr. Casper V. Beebe, who established a medical practice in Superior in the late 1870s.
