= Middle River, Wisconsin =

- Unincorporated community
- Location within Wisconsin Location within the United States
- Coordinates: 46°34′07″N 91°54′03″W
- Country: United States
- State: Wisconsin
- County: Douglas
- Town: Amnicon
- Elevation: 1,047 ft (319 m)
- Time zone: UTC-6 (Central (CST))
  - Summer (DST): UTC-5 (CDT)
- Area codes: 715 and 534
- GNIS feature ID: 2741527

Middle River is an unincorporated community located in the town of Amnicon, Douglas County, Wisconsin, United States. Middle River is located on County Road E near the Middle River, 5 miles (8.0 km) west-southwest of Poplar.
