= Hawthorne, Wisconsin =

Town of Hawthorne, Wisconsin
- Town
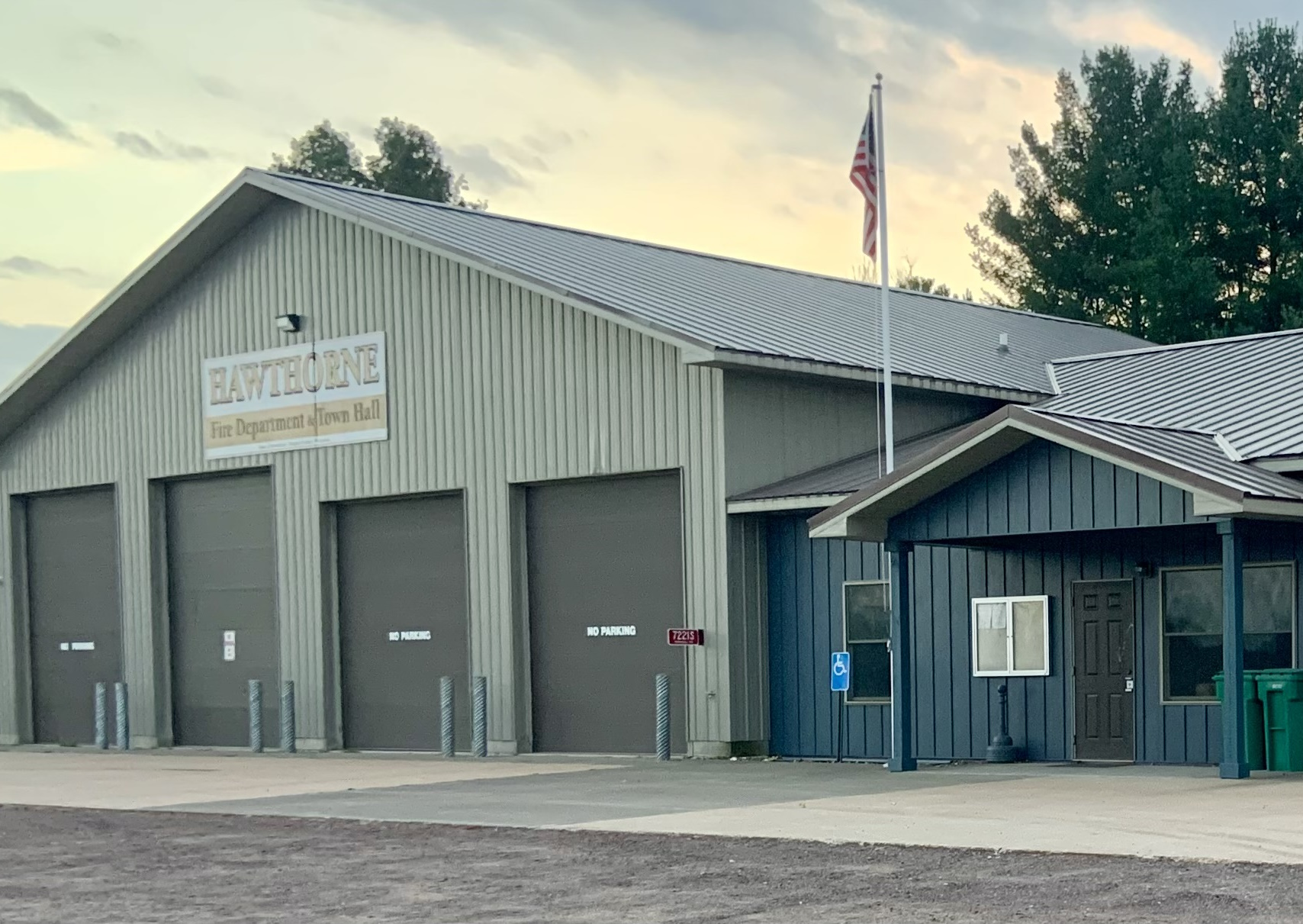
- Town hall

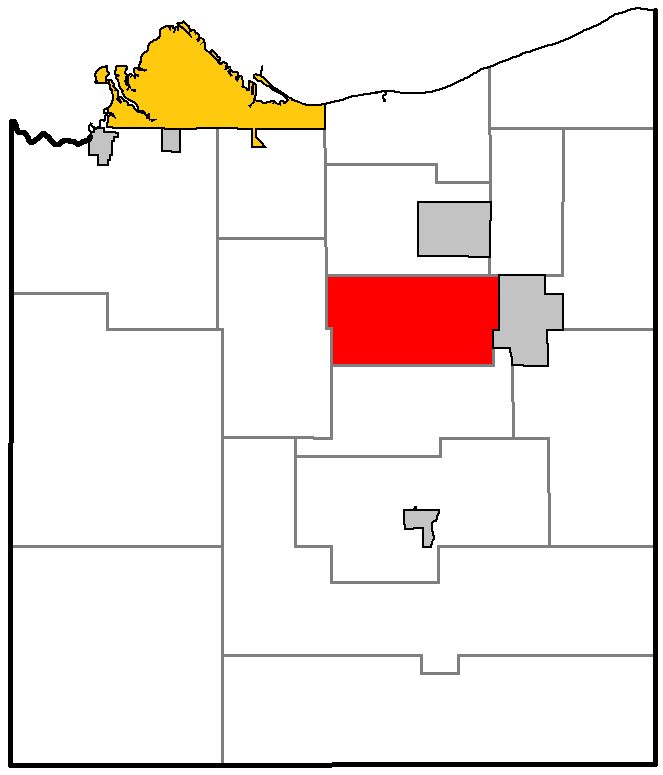
- Location of the Town of Hawthorne, within Douglas County
- Coordinates: 46°30′44″N 91°50′5″W
- Country: United States
- State: Wisconsin
- County: Douglas

Area
  - Total: 46.1 sq mi (119.5 km^{2})
  - Land: 45.6 sq mi (118.1 km^{2})
  - Water: 0.54 sq mi (1.4 km^{2})
- Elevation: 1,178 ft (359 m)

Population (2020)
  - Total: 1,058
  - Density: 23.20/sq mi (8.959/km^{2})
- Time zone: UTC-6 (Central (CST))
  - Summer (DST): UTC-5 (CDT)
- Area codes: 715 and 534
- FIPS code: 55-33350
- GNIS feature ID: 1583368
- Website: https://townofhawthorne.wi.gov/

Hawthorne is a town in Douglas County, Wisconsin, United States. The population was 1,058 at the 2020 census. The unincorporated communities of Dobie, Hawthorne, Hillcrest, and Hines are located in the town.

== Transportation ==
U.S. Highway 53 and County Roads B, D and E are main routes in the town.

== Geography ==
According to the United States Census Bureau, the town has a total area of 46.2 square miles (119.6 km^{2}), of which 45.6 square miles (118.1 km^{2}) is land and 0.5 square mile (1.4 km^{2}) (1.17%) is water.

== Demographics ==
As of the census of 2000, there were 1,045 people, 338 households, and 264 families residing in the town. The population density was 22.9 people per square mile (8.8/km^{2}). There were 399 housing units at an average density of 8.7 per square mile (3.4/km^{2}). The racial makeup of the town was 97.61% White, 0.19% African American, 1.44% Native American, 0.10% Asian, and 0.67% from two or more races. Hispanic or Latino of any race were 0.77% of the population.

There were 338 households, out of which 38.5% had children under the age of 18 living with them, 64.2% were married couples living together, 6.2% had a female householder with no husband present, and 21.6% were non-families. 16.3% of all households were made up of individuals, and 6.2% had someone living alone who was 65 years of age or older. The average household size was 2.81 and the average family size was 3.11.

In the town, the population was spread out, with 27.6% under the age of 18, 5.3% from 18 to 24, 27.9% from 25 to 44, 21.7% from 45 to 64, and 17.5% who were 65 years of age or older. The median age was 39 years. For every 100 females, there were 97.2 males. For every 100 females age 18 and over, here were 93.6 males.

The median income for a household in the town was $44,856, and the median income for a family was $50,313. Males had a median income of $36,641 versus $25,078 for females. The per capita income for the town was $16,855. About 2.3% of families and 7.0% of the population were below the poverty line, including 9.2% of those under age 18 and 10.4% of those age 65 or over.
