= Solon Springs Municipal Airport =

- IATA: none; ICAO: KOLG; FAA LID: OLG

Summary
- Airport type: Public
- Serves: Solon Springs, Wisconsin
- Opened: August 1952
- Time zone: CST (UTC−06:00)
  - Summer (DST): CDT (UTC−05:00)
- Elevation AMSL: 1,102 ft / 336 m
- Coordinates: 46°18′53″N 091°48′59″W

Map
- Location of airport in Wisconsin OLG (the United States)

Runways
| Direction | Length | | Surface |
| Direction | ft | m | Surface |
|---|---|---|---|
| 1/19 | 3,099 | 945 | Asphalt |

Helipads
| Number | Length | | Surface |
| Number | ft | m | Surface |
|---|---|---|---|
| H1 | 40 | 12 | Asphalt |

Statistics
- Aircraft operations (2021): 4,525
- Based aircraft (2024): 15
- Source: Federal Aviation Administration

Solon Springs Municipal Airport (ICAO: KOLG, FAA LID: OLG) is a public use airport located three nautical miles (6 km) south of the central business district of Solon Springs, in Douglas County, Wisconsin, United States. It is included in the Federal Aviation Administration (FAA) National Plan of Integrated Airport Systems for 2025–2029, in which it is categorized as a local general aviation facility.

Although many U.S. airports use the same three-letter location identifier for the FAA and IATA, this facility is assigned OLG by the FAA but has no designation from the IATA.

== Facilities and aircraft ==
Solon Springs Municipal Airport covers an area of 128 acres (52 ha) at an elevation of 1,102 feet (336 m) above mean sea level. It has one runway designated 1/19 with an asphalt surface measuring 3,099 by 60 feet (945 x 18 m), with an approved GPS approach. It also has one heliport with an asphalt surface measuring 40 by 40 feet.

For the 12-month period ending July 29, 2021, the airport had 4,525 aircraft operations, an average of 12 per day: 99% general aviation and less than 1% air taxi. In June 2024, there were 15 aircraft based at this airport: all 15 single-engine.

== See also ==
- List of airports in Wisconsin
