= Lee, Maine =

Town in Maine, United States

- Town
- Location within Maine Location within the United States
- Coordinates: 45°22′21″N 68°17′07″W
- Country: United States
- State: Maine
- County: Penobscot

Area
  - Total: 39.77 sq mi (103.00 km^{2})
  - Land: 38.67 sq mi (100.15 km^{2})
  - Water: 1.10 sq mi (2.85 km^{2})
- Elevation: 423 ft (129 m)

Population (2020)
  - Total: 916
  - Density: 24/sq mi (9.1/km^{2})
- Time zone: UTC−5 (Eastern (EST))
  - Summer (DST): UTC−4 (EDT)
- ZIP Code: 04455
- Area code: 207
- FIPS code: 23-38530
- GNIS feature ID: 582551
- Website: townofleemaine.com

Lee is a town in Penobscot County, Maine, United States. It was incorporated in 1832. The town was originally called Mattekeunk, but changed it to Lee to give it an English name. Stephen Lee suggested the town be named Lee after Revolutionary general Henry "Light-Horse Harry" Lee. To further convince the townsfolk, he brought a barrel of rum to the meeting. The population was 916 at the 2020 census. Lee has been home to Lee Academy since 1845.

== Geography ==
According to the United States Census Bureau, the town has a total area of 39.77 square miles (103.00 km^{2}), of which 38.67 square miles (100.15 km^{2}) is land and 1.10 square miles (2.85 km^{2}) is water.

Lee is approximately 10 miles (16 km) from Interstate 95 and the same distance from Lincoln.

== Demographics ==
Historical population
| Census | Pop. | Note | %± |
|---|---|---|---|
| 1840 | 724 | | — |
| 1850 | 917 | | 26.7% |
| 1860 | 939 | | 2.4% |
| 1870 | 960 | | 2.2% |
| 1880 | 894 | | −6.9% |
| 1890 | 929 | | 3.9% |
| 1900 | 801 | | −13.8% |
| 1910 | 748 | | −6.6% |
| 1920 | 724 | | −3.2% |
| 1930 | 669 | | −7.6% |
| 1940 | 618 | | −7.6% |
| 1950 | 610 | | −1.3% |
| 1960 | 555 | | −9.0% |
| 1970 | 599 | | 7.9% |
| 1980 | 688 | | 14.9% |
| 1990 | 832 | | 20.9% |
| 2000 | 845 | | 1.6% |
| 2010 | 922 | | 9.1% |
| 2020 | 916 | | −0.7% |
U.S. Decennial Census

=== 2010 census ===
As of the census of 2010, there were 922 people, 356 households, and 262 families living in the town. The population density was 23.8 inhabitants per square mile (9.2/km^{2}). There were 546 housing units at an average density of 14.1 per square mile (5.4/km^{2}). The racial makeup of the town was 89.9% White, 1.8% African American, 0.8% Native American, 6.2% Asian, 0.2% from other races, and 1.1% from two or more races. Hispanic or Latino of any race were 0.8% of the population.

There were 356 households, of which 28.7% had children under the age of 18 living with them, 59.6% were married couples living together, 7.9% had a female householder with no husband present, 6.2% had a male householder with no wife present, and 26.4% were non-families. 21.1% of all households were made up of individuals, and 11.3% had someone living alone who was 65 years of age or older. The average household size was 2.37 and the average family size was 2.65.

The median age in the town was 45.9 years. 21.1% of residents were under the age of 18; 12% were between the ages of 18 and 24; 15.6% were from 25 to 44; 34.1% were from 45 to 64; and 17.2% were 65 years of age or older. The gender makeup of the town was 52.3% male and 47.7% female.

=== 2000 census ===
As of the census of 2000, there were 845 people, 298 households, and 247 families living in the town. The population density was 21.9 inhabitants per square mile (8.5/km^{2}). There were 463 housing units at an average density of 12.0 per square mile (4.6/km^{2}). The racial makeup of the town was 98.82% White, 0.12% Native American, 0.12% Asian, and 0.95% from two or more races. Hispanic or Latino of any race were 0.12% of the population.

There were 298 households, out of which 39.3% had children under the age of 18 living with them, 73.5% were married couples living together, 6.4% had a female householder with no husband present, and 16.8% were non-families. 12.8% of all households were made up of individuals, and 6.7% had someone living alone who was 65 years of age or older. The average household size was 2.81 and the average family size was 3.03.

In the town, the population was spread out, with 27.9% under the age of 18, 5.2% from 18 to 24, 32.3% from 25 to 44, 20.0% from 45 to 64, and 14.6% who were 65 years of age or older. The median age was 38 years. For every 100 females, there were 105.1 males. For every 100 females age 18 and over, there were 102.3 males.

The median income for a household in the town was $34,519, and the median income for a family was $35,813. Males had a median income of $33,214 versus $23,462 for females. The per capita income for the town was $16,857. About 8.8% of families and 12.5% of the population were below the poverty line, including 14.3% of those under age 18 and 21.7% of those age 65 or over.

== Education ==
It is in Maine School Administrative District 30. It operates Lee/Winn Elementary School in Winn and Mount Jefferson Junior High School in Lee.

Lee Academy is a private school in the town. MASD 30 does not operate a high school, but instead pays Lee Academy to educate its students at the high school level.

== Notable people ==
- Everett McLeod, Maine State Representative
- King G. Staples, Wisconsin State Assemblyman
