= Sauntry, Wisconsin =

- Unincorporated community
- Location within Wisconsin Location within the United States
- Coordinates: 46°22′28″N 91°49′22″W
- Country: United States
- State: Wisconsin
- County: Douglas
- Town: Solon Springs
- Elevation: 1,142 ft (348 m)
- Time zone: UTC-6 (Central (CST))
  - Summer (DST): UTC-5 (CDT)
- Area codes: 715 and 534
- GNIS feature ID: 1573741

Sauntry is an unincorporated community located in the town of Solon Springs, Douglas County, Wisconsin, United States.

== History ==
The community was named for C. S. Sauntry, a businessperson in the lumber industry.
