= Amnicon, Wisconsin =

Town of Amnicon, Wisconsin
- Town
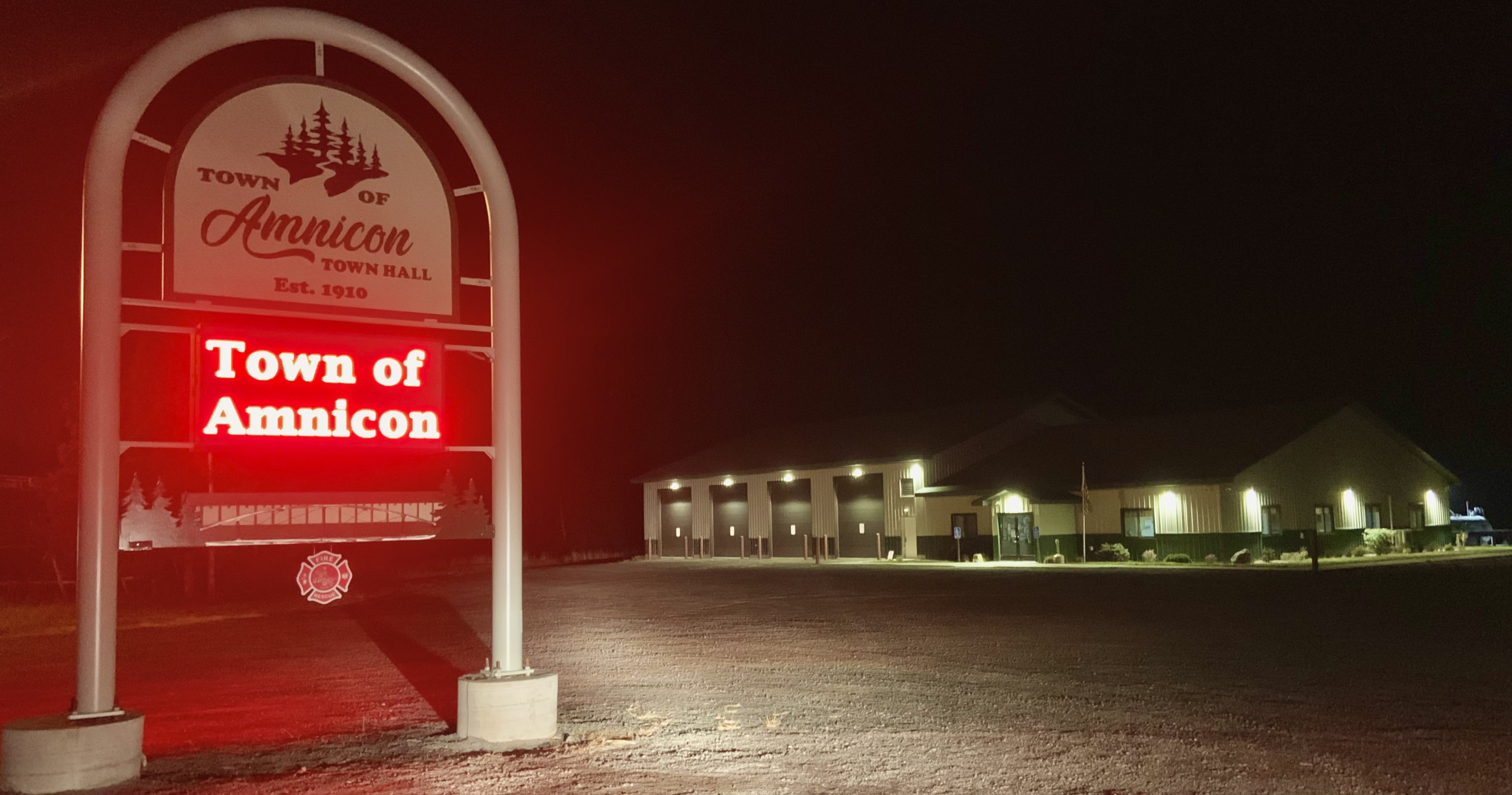
- Town hall

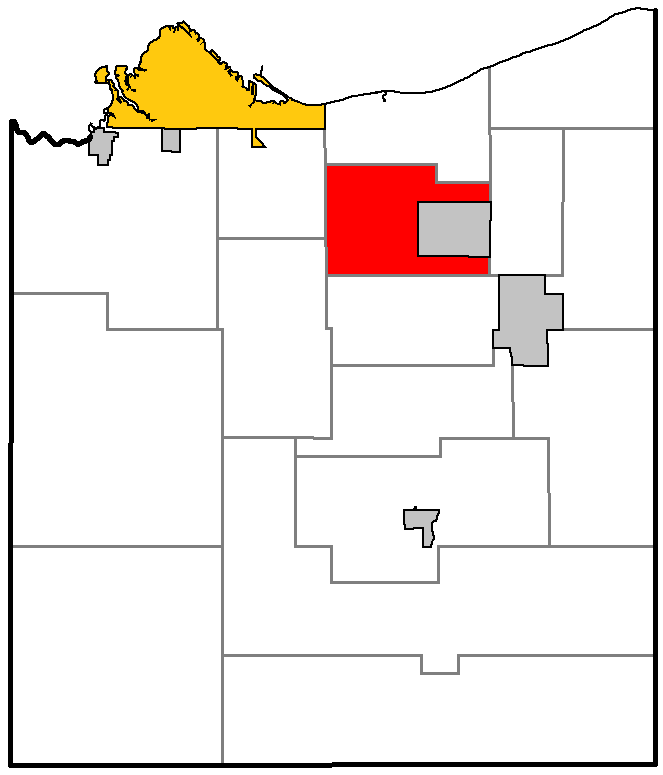
- Location of the town of Amnicon in Douglas County, Wisconsin
- Coordinates: 46°34′52″N 91°52′22″W
- Country: United States
- State: Wisconsin
- County: Douglas

Area
  - Total: 39.1 sq mi (101.3 km^{2})
  - Land: 39.1 sq mi (101.2 km^{2})
  - Water: 0 sq mi (0.0 km^{2})
- Elevation: 974 ft (297 m)

Population (2020)
  - Total: 1,224
  - Density: 31.33/sq mi (12.09/km^{2})
- Time zone: UTC-6 (Central (CST))
  - Summer (DST): UTC-5 (CDT)
- Area codes: 715 and 534
- FIPS code: 55-01825
- GNIS feature ID: 1582692
- Website: https://townofamnicon.wi.gov/

Amnicon is a town in Douglas County, Wisconsin, United States. The population was 1,224 at the 2020 census. The unincorporated communities of Amnicon Falls, Middle River, Rockmont and Wentworth are located in the town.

== Etymology ==
The name Amnicon is of Ojibwe origin. It is derived from aminikan, meaning 'spawning ground'.

== Geography ==
According to the United States Census Bureau, the town has a total area of 39.1 square miles (101.2 km^{2}), of which, 39.1 square miles (101.2 km^{2}) is land and 0.04 square mile (0.1 km^{2}) (0.05%) is water.

Amnicon is located 14 miles east-southeast of the city of Superior. It is along U.S. Highways 2 and 53.

== Demographics ==
As of the census of 2000, there were 1,074 people, 364 households, and 294 families residing in the town. The population density was 27.5 people per square mile (10.6/km^{2}). There were 383 housing units at an average density of 9.8 per square mile (3.8/km^{2}). The racial makeup of the town was 95.81% White, 0.56% African American, 1.21% Native American, 0.47% Asian, 0.09% from other races, and 1.86% from two or more races. Hispanic or Latino of any race were 0.56% of the population.

There were 364 households, out of which 43.7% had children under the age of 18 living with them, 66.8% were married couples living together, 9.1% had a female householder with no husband present, and 19.2% were non-families. 16.2% of all households were made up of individuals, and 4.4% had someone living alone who was 65 years of age or older. The average household size was 2.95 and the average family size was 3.26.

In the town, the population was spread out, with 31.0% under the age of 18, 6.7% from 18 to 24, 30.4% from 25 to 44, 24.3% from 45 to 64, and 7.5% who were 65 years of age or older. The median age was 35 years. For every 100 females, there were 103.0 males. For every 100 females age 18 and over, there were 98.1 males.

The median income for a household in the town was $48,654, and the median income for a family was $53,235. Males had a median income of $35,347 versus $21,750 for females. The per capita income for the town was $16,968. About 2.1% of families and 4.8% of the population were below the poverty line, including 8.2% of those under age 18 and 6.7% of those age 65 or over.
