= Parkland, Wisconsin =

- Town
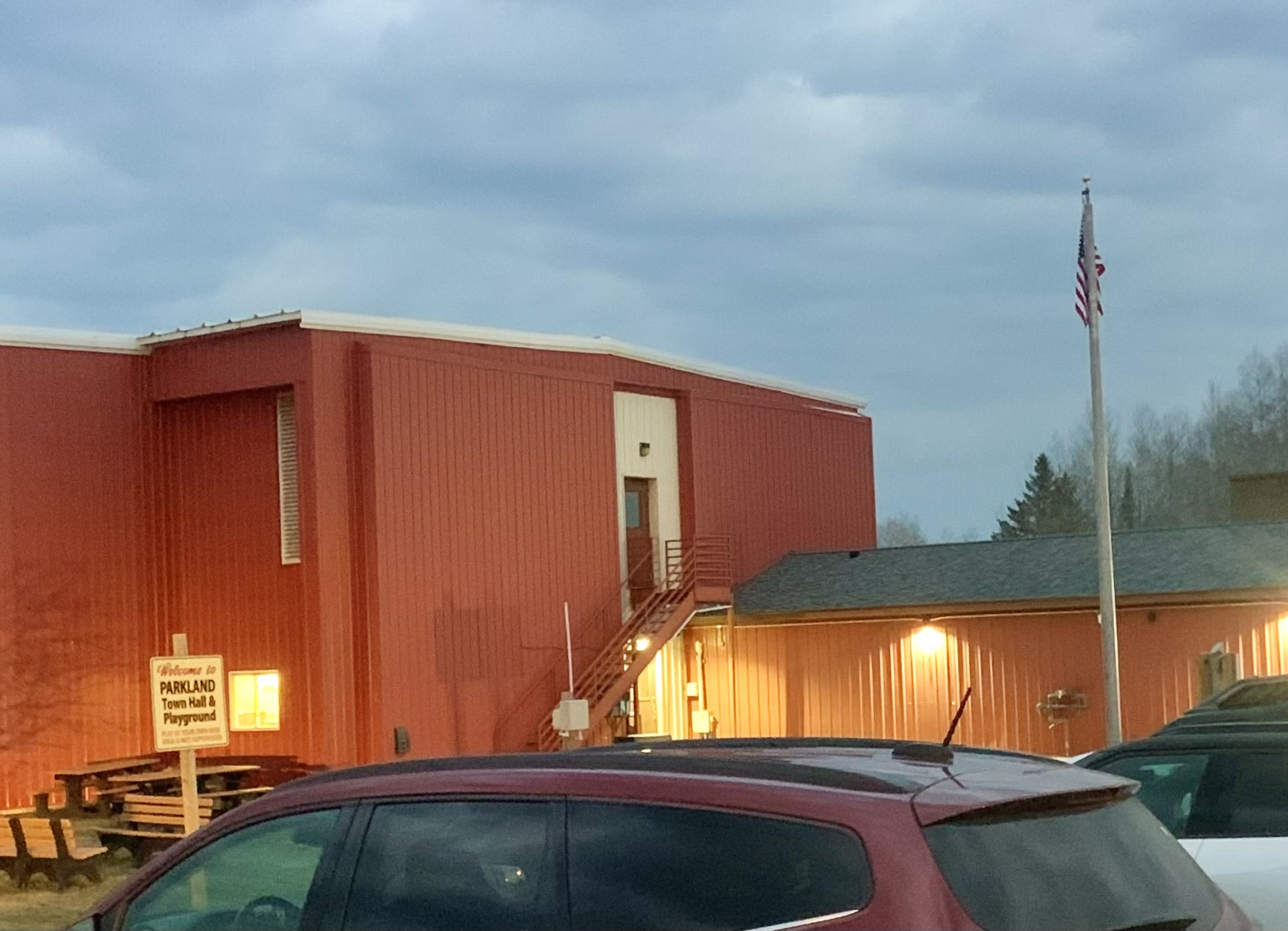
- Town hall

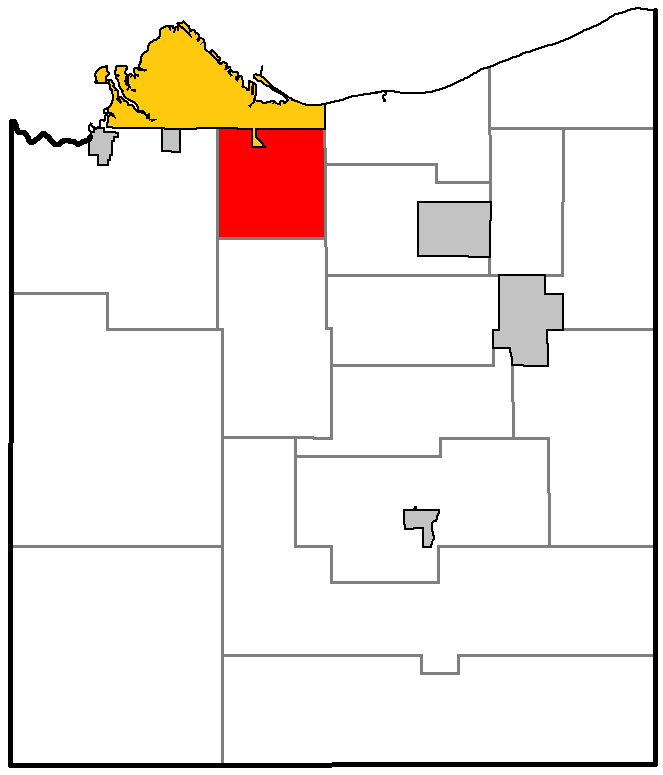
- Location of Parkland, within Douglas County
- Coordinates: 46°37′49″N 91°59′22″W
- Country: United States
- State: Wisconsin
- County: Douglas

Area
  - Total: 35.5 sq mi (92.0 km^{2})
  - Land: 35.5 sq mi (92.0 km^{2})
  - Water: 0 sq mi (0.0 km^{2})
- Elevation: 728 ft (222 m)

Population (2020)
  - Total: 1,231
  - Density: 34.7/sq mi (13.4/km^{2})
- Time zone: UTC-6 (Central (CST))
  - Summer (DST): UTC-5 (CDT)
- Area codes: 715 and 534
- FIPS code: 55-61250
- GNIS feature ID: 1583896

Parkland is a town in Douglas County, Wisconsin, United States. The population was 1,231 at the 2020 census. The unincorporated communities of Cutter, Parkland, Peyton, South Itasca, Sunnyside and South Range are in the town.

== Geography ==
According to the United States Census Bureau, the town has a total area of 35.5 square miles (91.9 km^{2}), all land.

The Town of Parkland is located south of the city of Superior. Parkland Town Hall is in the unincorporated community of South Range.

== Demographics ==
As of the census of 2000, there were 1,240 people, 463 households, and 363 families living in the town. The population density was 34.9 people per square mile (13.5/km^{2}). There were 480 housing units at an average density of 13.5 per square mile (5.2/km^{2}). The racial makeup of the town was 97.02% White, 0.16% African American, 1.05% Native American, 0.40% Asian, 0.16% from other races, and 1.21% from two or more races. Hispanic or Latino of any race were 1.05% of the population.

There were 463 households, out of which 34.6% had children under the age of 18 living with them, 66.5% were married couples living together, 7.3% had a female householder with no husband present, and 21.4% were non-families. 16.4% of all households were made up of individuals, and 5.2% had someone living alone who was 65 years of age or older. The average household size was 2.68 and the average family size was 2.98.

In the town, the population was spread out, with 25.6% under the age of 18, 7.1% from 18 to 24, 28.8% from 25 to 44, 26.2% from 45 to 64, and 12.3% who were 65 years of age or older. The median age was 39 years. For every 100 females, there were 101.0 males. For every 100 females age 18 and over, there were 102.2 males.

The median income for a household in the town was $40,804, and the median income for a family was $43,375. Males had a median income of $34,318 versus $21,141 for females. The per capita income for the town was $17,090. About 3.9% of families and 4.7% of the population were below the poverty line, including 4.4% of those under age 18 and 5.5% of those age 65 or over.

== Transportation ==
County Road E, County Road Z, State Highway 13, County Road K, and U.S. Route 2 / U.S. Route 53 (co-signed) are five of the main routes in the community.

== Education ==
The Superior School District serves the town. It has six elementary schools, one middle school, and one high school.
