= Douglas County, Wisconsin =

County in Wisconsin, United States

- County
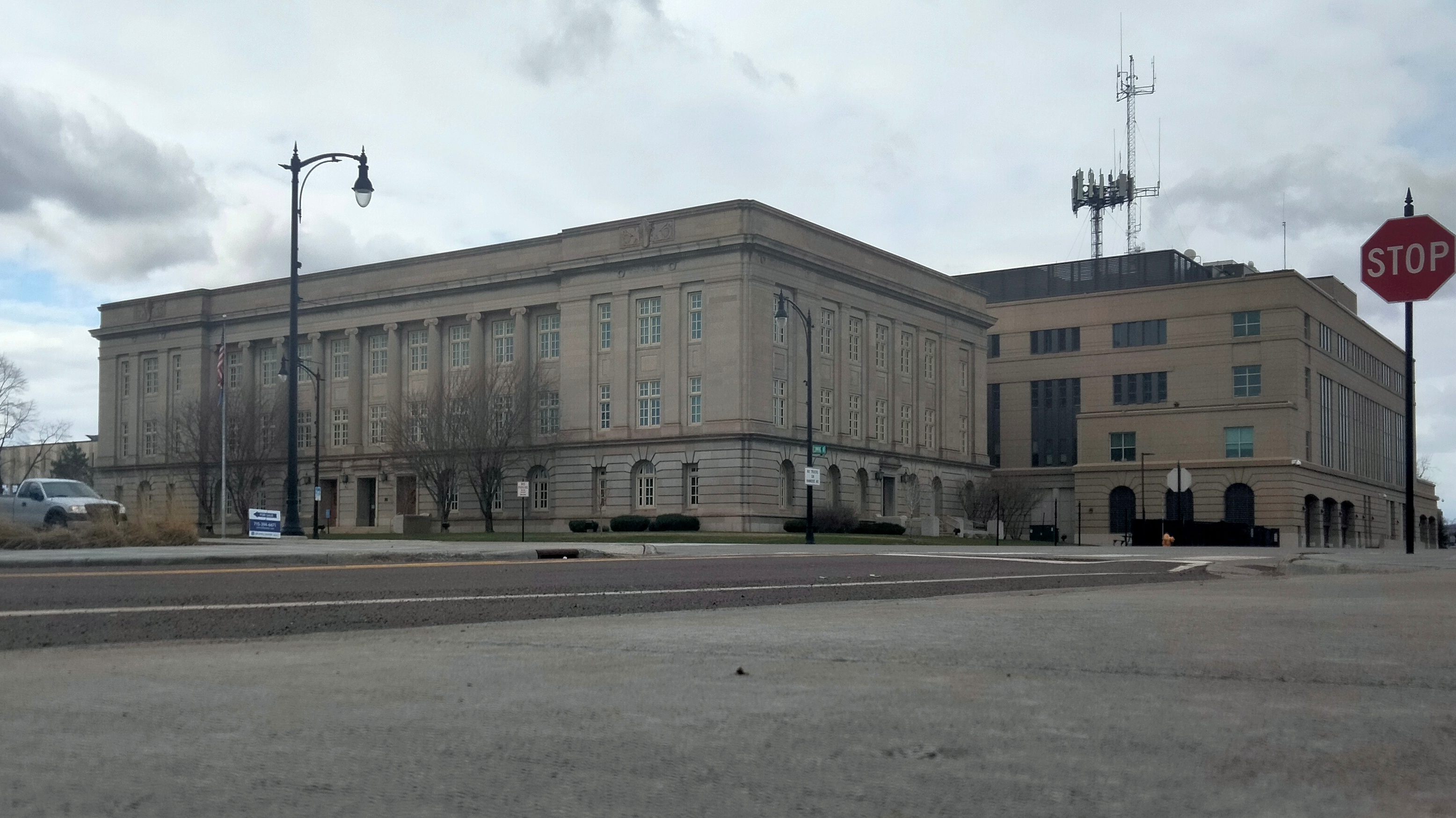
- Douglas County Courthouse in Superior in 2023

- Location within the U.S. state of Wisconsin
- Coordinates: 46°27′N 91°55′W
- Country: United States
- State: Wisconsin
- Founded: February 8, 1854
- Named for: Stephen A. Douglas
- Seat: Superior
- Largest city: Superior

Area
  - Total: 1,480 sq mi (3,800 km^{2})
  - Land: 1,304 sq mi (3,380 km^{2})
  - Water: 176 sq mi (460 km^{2}) 12%

Population (2020)
  - Total: 44,295
  - Estimate (2025): 43,990 ▼
  - Density: 33.97/sq mi (13.12/km^{2})
- Time zone: UTC−6 (Central)
  - Summer (DST): UTC−5 (CDT)
- Congressional district: 7th
- Website: www.douglascountywi.gov

Douglas County is a county in the northwestern corner of the U.S. state of Wisconsin. As of the 2020 census, the population was 44,295. Its county seat is Superior. Douglas County is included in the Duluth, MN–WI Metropolitan Statistical Area.

== History ==
Douglas County, named after Illinois Senator Stephen A. Douglas, was established on February 8, 1854, from the larger La Pointe County, Wisconsin, and the City of Superior was immediately selected as the county seat.

In Wisconsin's 1952 U.S. Senate primary, Douglas County was one of two counties (out of 71 in the state at the time) that Sen. Joe McCarthy did not carry.

== Geography ==
According to the U.S. Census Bureau, the county has an area of 1,480 square miles (3,800 km^{2}), of which 1,304 square miles (3,380 km^{2}) is land and 176 square miles (460 km^{2}) (12%) is water.

Part of the Fond du Lac Indian Reservation is in Douglas County.

=== Adjacent counties ===
- Bayfield County – east
- Sawyer County – southeast
- Washburn County – south
- Burnett County – southwest
- Pine County, Minnesota – southwest
- Carlton County, Minnesota – west
- Saint Louis County, Minnesota – northwest
- Lake County, Minnesota – northeast

=== Major highways ===
- Interstate 535
- U.S. Highway 2
- U.S. Highway 53
- Wisconsin Highway 13
- Wisconsin Highway 27
- Wisconsin Highway 35
- Wisconsin Highway 105
- Minnesota Highway 23

=== Railroads ===
- BNSF
- Canadian National
- Canadian Pacific
- Union Pacific

=== Buses ===
- Duluth Transit Authority
- Indian Trails

=== Airports ===
- Solon Springs Municipal Airport (KOLG) serves the county and surrounding communities.
- Richard I. Bong Airport (KSUW)

=== National protected area ===
- Saint Croix National Scenic Riverway (part)

== Demographics ==
Historical population
Census	Pop.	Note	%±
1860	812		—
1870	1,122		38.2%
1880	655		−41.6%
1890	13,468		1,956.2%
1900	36,335		169.8%
1910	47,422		30.5%
1920	49,771		5.0%
1930	46,583		−6.4%
1940	47,119		1.2%
1950	46,715		−0.9%
1960	45,008		−3.7%
1970	44,657		−0.8%
1980	44,421		−0.5%
1990	41,758		−6.0%
2000	43,287		3.7%
2010	44,159		2.0%
2020	44,295		0.3%
2025 (est.)	43,990	▼	−0.7%
U.S. Decennial Census; 1790–1960 1900–1990; 1990–2000 2010–2020 2020 census

=== Racial and ethnic composition ===
Douglas County, Wisconsin – Racial and ethnic composition Note: the US Census treats Hispanic/Latino as an ethnic category. This table excludes Latinos from the racial categories and assigns them to a separate category. Hispanics/Latinos may be of any race.
Race / ethnicity (NH = Non-Hispanic)	Pop 1980	Pop 1990	Pop 2000	Pop 2010	Pop 2020	% 1980	% 1990	% 2000	% 2010	% 2020
White alone (NH)	43,381	40,317	41,081	40,854	39,417	97.66%	96.55%	94.90%	92.52%	88.99%
Black or African American alone (NH)	114	169	245	475	576	0.26%	0.40%	0.57%	1.08%	1.30%
Native American or Alaska Native alone (NH)	582	800	771	838	763	1.31%	1.92%	1.78%	1.90%	1.72%
Asian alone (NH)	106	263	271	370	286	0.24%	0.63%	0.63%	0.84%	0.65%
Native Hawaiian or Pacific Islander alone (NH)	x	x	10	7	18	x	x	0.02%	0.02%	0.04%
Other race alone (NH)	99	8	15	19	139	0.22%	0.02%	0.03%	0.04%	0.31%
Mixed race or Multiracial (NH)	x	x	579	1,102	2,328	x	x	1.34%	2.50%	5.26%
Hispanic or Latino (any race)	139	201	315	494	768	0.31%	0.48%	0.73%	1.12%	1.73%
Total	44,421	41,758	43,287	44,159	44,295	100.00%	100.00%	100.00%	100.00%	100.00%

=== 2020 census ===
As of the 2020 census, the county had a population of 44,295. The median age was 42.1 years. 19.5% of residents were under the age of 18 and 19.9% of residents were 65 years of age or older. For every 100 females there were 101.4 males, and for every 100 females age 18 and over there were 100.0 males age 18 and over.

The population density was 34.0 people per square mile (13.1 people/km^{2}). There were 22,906 housing units at an average density of 17.6 units per square mile (6.8 units/km^{2}).

The racial makeup of the county was 89.7% White, 1.3% Black or African American, 1.8% American Indian and Alaska Native, 0.6% Asian, <0.1% Native Hawaiian and Pacific Islander, 0.6% from some other race, and 5.9% from two or more races. Hispanic or Latino residents of any race comprised 1.7% of the population.

61.4% of residents lived in urban areas, while 38.6% lived in rural areas.

There were 19,219 households in the county, of which 24.2% had children under the age of 18 living in them. Of all households, 42.9% were married-couple households, 22.6% were households with a male householder and no spouse or partner present, and 25.0% were households with a female householder and no spouse or partner present. About 32.9% of all households were made up of individuals and 13.1% had someone living alone who was 65 years of age or older.

Of the 22,906 housing units, 16.1% were vacant. Among occupied housing units, 67.2% were owner-occupied and 32.8% were renter-occupied. The homeowner vacancy rate was 1.0% and the rental vacancy rate was 4.7%.

=== 2010 census ===
As of the 2010 United States census, there were 44,159 people living in the county. 93.2% were White, 2.0% Native American, 1.1% Black or African American, 0.9% Asian, 0.2% of some other race and 2.7% of two or more races. 1.1% were Hispanic or Latino (of any race). 20.7% were of German, 11.2% Norwegian, 9.7% Swedish, 7.8% Irish, 6.4% Finnish and 6.1% Polish ancestry.

=== 2000 census ===
2000 Census Age Pyramid for Douglas County

As of the census of 2000, there were 43,287 people, 17,808 households, and 11,272 families living in the county. The population density was 33 people per square mile (13 people/km^{2}). There were 20,356 housing units at an average density of 16 units per square mile (6.2 units/km^{2}). The racial makeup of the county was 95.35% White, 0.57% Black or African American, 1.82% Native American, 0.63% Asian, 0.03% Pacific Islander, 0.20% from other races, and 1.41% from two or more races. 0.73% of the population were Hispanic or Latino of any race. 17.8% had German, 13.5% Norwegian, 11.5% Swedish, 8.5% Irish, 8.2% Finnish, 6.8% Polish and 5.1% United States or American ancestry. 96.7% spoke English and 1.2% Spanish as their first language.

There were 17,808 households, out of which 29.20% had children under the age of 18 living with them, 49.10% were married couples living together, 10.10% had a female householder with no husband present, and 36.70% were non-families. 29.80% of all households were made up of individuals, and 12.00% had someone living alone who was 65 years of age or older. The average household size was 2.36 and the average family size was 2.93.

In the county, the population was spread out, with 23.60% under the age of 18, 10.30% from 18 to 24, 28.00% from 25 to 44, 23.60% from 45 to 64, and 14.50% who were 65 years of age or older. The median age was 38 years. For every 100 females there were 97.20 males. For every 100 females age 18 and over, there were 94.40 males.

In 2017, there were 413 births, giving a general fertility rate of 50.8 births per 1000 women aged 15–44, the seventh lowest rate out of all 72 Wisconsin counties. Additionally, there were no reported induced abortions performed on women of Douglas County residence in 2017.

== Communities ==
=== City ===
- Superior (county seat)

=== Villages ===
- Lake Nebagamon
- Oliver
- Poplar
- Solon Springs
- Superior

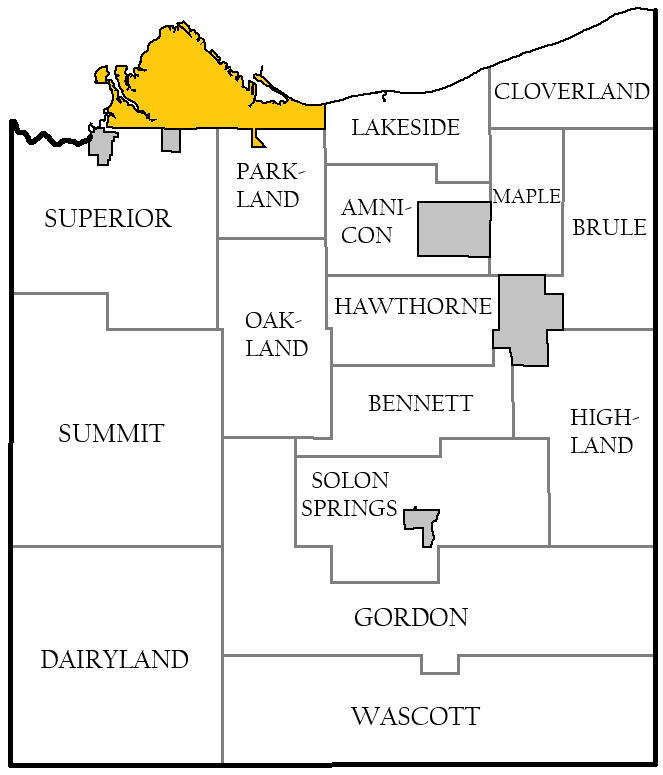
Towns of Douglas County

=== Towns ===
- Amnicon
- Bennett
- Brule
- Cloverland
- Dairyland
- Gordon
- Hawthorne
- Highland
- Lakeside
- Maple
- Oakland
- Parkland
- Solon Springs
- Summit
- Superior
- Wascott

=== Census-designated places ===
- Brule
- Gordon

=== Unincorporated communities ===
- Ambridge
- Amnicon Falls
- Anton
- Beebe
- Bellwood
- Bennett
- Black River
- Blueberry
- Borea
- Boylston
- Boylston Junction
- Carnegie
- Chaffey
- Cloverland
- Cozy Corner
- Cutter
- Dairyland
- Dedham
- Dewey
- Dobie
- Four Corners
- Foxboro
- Hawthorne
- Hillcrest
- Hines
- Maple
- Middle River
- Moose Junction
- Parkland
- Patzau
- Peyton
- Pokegama
- Riverview
- Rockmont
- Saunders
- Sauntry
- South Itasca
- South Range
- Sunnyside
- Waino
- Wascott
- Wentworth
- Winneboujou

=== Ghost towns ===
- Merriam
- Millcrest
- Morrison (Allouez) (annexed by the City of Superior)
- New Bristol (Martinson)
- Nutt
- Pokegama Junction
- Steele
- Troy
- Walbridge
- Way
- Wiehe

== Politics ==
United States presidential election results for Douglas County, Wisconsin
Year	Republican		Democratic		Third party(ies)	
Year	No.	%	No.	%	No.	%
1892	2,967	50.66%	2,340	39.95%	550	9.39%
1896	4,274	61.45%	2,527	36.33%	154	2.21%
1900	4,450	63.85%	2,187	31.38%	333	4.78%
1904	4,564	72.94%	974	15.57%	719	11.49%
1908	3,509	55.88%	1,715	27.31%	1,056	16.82%
1912	730	14.22%	1,181	23.00%	3,223	62.78%
1916	3,007	43.57%	2,940	42.60%	955	13.84%
1920	7,250	67.53%	2,111	19.66%	1,375	12.81%
1924	5,887	39.14%	638	4.24%	8,514	56.61%
1928	11,280	61.20%	6,762	36.69%	390	2.12%
1932	7,888	41.63%	9,715	51.27%	1,346	7.10%
1936	5,079	22.92%	16,684	75.28%	400	1.80%
1940	7,695	32.72%	15,548	66.12%	272	1.16%
1944	7,132	35.20%	12,985	64.08%	146	0.72%
1948	6,252	32.48%	12,278	63.79%	718	3.73%
1952	9,677	45.40%	11,538	54.14%	98	0.46%
1956	9,183	44.79%	11,276	55.00%	43	0.21%
1960	8,307	39.06%	12,910	60.70%	53	0.25%
1964	4,579	23.08%	15,237	76.80%	23	0.12%
1968	5,656	29.59%	12,506	65.43%	953	4.99%
1972	8,419	42.58%	11,054	55.91%	298	1.51%
1976	6,999	33.40%	13,478	64.32%	479	2.29%
1980	7,258	34.24%	11,703	55.21%	2,238	10.56%
1984	7,066	32.92%	14,291	66.58%	107	0.50%
1988	6,440	31.49%	13,907	68.01%	102	0.50%
1992	5,679	25.52%	12,319	55.36%	4,255	19.12%
1996	5,167	27.79%	10,976	59.04%	2,448	13.17%
2000	6,930	31.93%	13,593	62.62%	1,183	5.45%
2004	8,448	33.54%	16,537	65.66%	202	0.80%
2008	7,835	32.56%	15,830	65.78%	401	1.67%
2012	7,705	33.66%	14,863	64.92%	326	1.42%
2016	9,661	42.87%	11,357	50.39%	1,518	6.74%
2020	10,923	44.26%	13,218	53.56%	536	2.17%
2024	11,732	46.49%	13,073	51.81%	429	1.70%

During the 1930s and 1940s at the state level Douglas county was a stronghold for the Wisconsin Progressive Party - National Progressives. voting consistently for Philip La Follette during gubernatorial elections and Robert M. La Follette Jr. for senate. Douglas County has one of the longest Democratic voting streaks in the nation in presidential elections; the last Republican presidential candidate to win Douglas County was Herbert Hoover in 1928. But in 2024, Donald Trump received the highest percentage of Douglas County's vote for a Republican since the county's Democratic streak began, signaling a new competitiveness in the county. In every presidential election between 1984 and 2000, the county was always the second-most Democratic in the state (behind only Native American-dominated Menominee County), before being surpassed by Dane County in 2004, and several others since 2008.

Douglas County also regularly supports Democratic candidates at the state level.

== See also ==
- National Register of Historic Places listings in Douglas County, Wisconsin
- Pokegama Bay
