= Black River, Wisconsin =

- Unincorporated community
- Location within Wisconsin Location within the United States
- Coordinates: 46°33′44″N 92°08′51″W
- Country: United States
- State: Wisconsin
- County: Douglas
- Town: Superior
- Elevation: 751 ft (229 m)
- Time zone: UTC-6 (Central (CST))
  - Summer (DST): UTC-5 (CDT)
- Area codes: 715 and 534
- GNIS feature ID: 1577517

Black River is an unincorporated community located in the town of Superior, Douglas County, Wisconsin, United States.
