= Wascott, Wisconsin =

Town of Wascott, Wisconsin
- Town
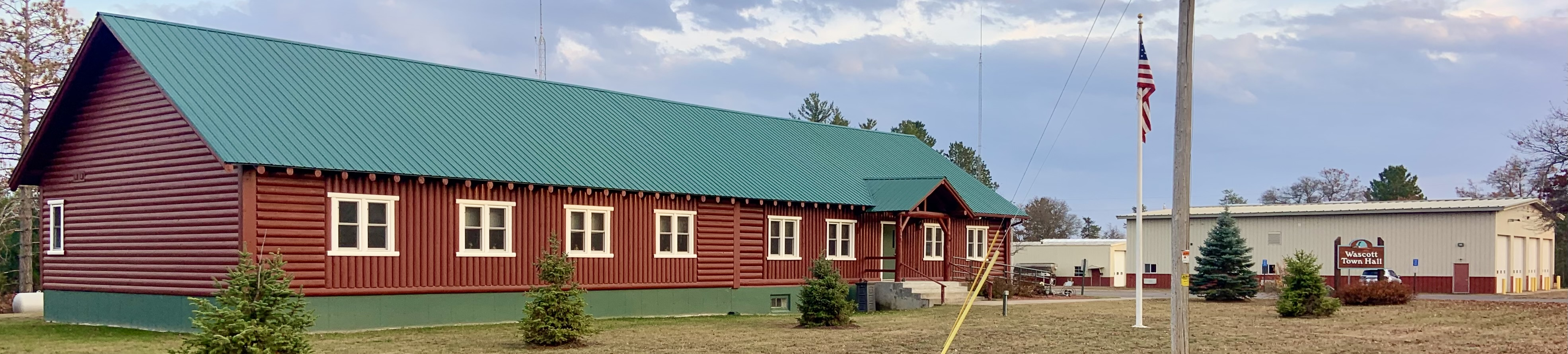
- Town hall

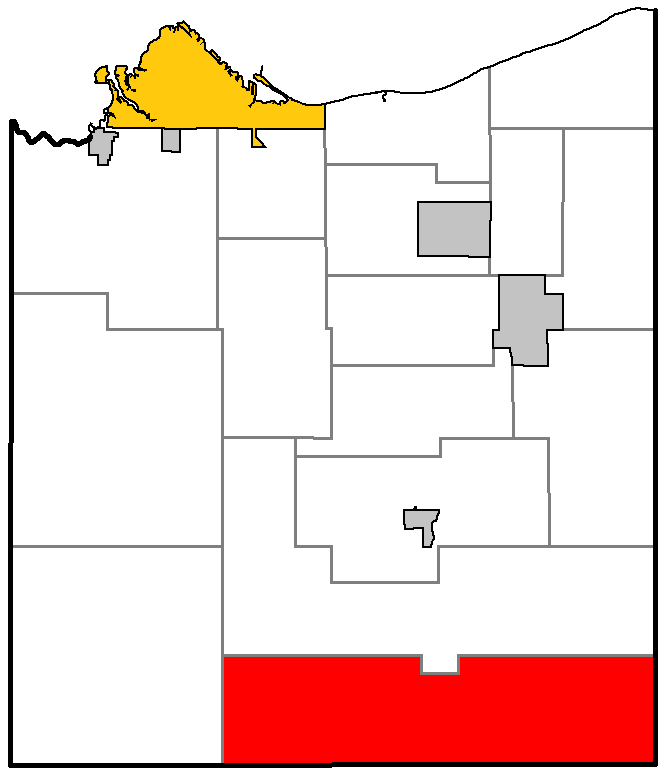
- Location of the Town of Wascott, within Douglas County
- Coordinates: 46°11′38″N 91°51′10″W
- Country: United States
- State: Wisconsin
- County: Douglas

Area
  - Total: 141.1 sq mi (365.5 km^{2})
  - Land: 133.0 sq mi (344.4 km^{2})
  - Water: 8.1 sq mi (21.1 km^{2})
- Elevation: 1,073 ft (327 m)

Population (2020)
  - Total: 912
  - Density: 6.86/sq mi (2.65/km^{2})
- Time zone: UTC-6 (Central (CST))
  - Summer (DST): UTC-5 (CDT)
- ZIP codes: 54890
- Area codes: 715 and 534
- FIPS code: 55-83512
- GNIS feature ID: 1584348
- Website: www.townofwascott.org

Wascott is a town in Douglas County, Wisconsin, United States. The population was 912 at the 2020 census. The unincorporated community of Wascott is located in the town.

== History ==
The town is named for W. A. Scott, a railroad company president.

== Transportation ==
U.S. Highway 53 serves as a main route through the town.

== Geography ==
According to the United States Census Bureau, the town has a total area of 141.1 square miles (365.5 km^{2}), of which 133.0 square miles (344.4 km^{2}) is land and 8.2 square miles (21.1 km^{2}) (5.78%) is water.

== Demographics ==
As of the census of 2000, there were 714 people, 295 households, and 208 families residing in the town. The population density was 5.4 people per square mile (2.1/km^{2}). There were 806 housing units at an average density of 6.1 per square mile (2.3/km^{2}). The racial makeup of the town was 93.28% White, 4.34% African American, 0.98% Native American, 0.14% Asian, 0.14% from other races, and 1.12% from two or more races. Hispanic or Latino of any race were 0.56% of the population.

There were 295 households, out of which 15.9% had children under the age of 18 living with them, 65.1% were married couples living together, 2.0% had a female householder with no husband present, and 29.2% were non-families. 24.7% of all households were made up of individuals, and 9.5% had someone living alone who was 65 years of age or older. The average household size was 2.18 and the average family size was 2.57.

In the town, the population was spread out, with 13.9% under the age of 18, 4.2% from 18 to 24, 24.5% from 25 to 44, 32.8% from 45 to 64, and 24.6% who were 65 years of age or older. The median age was 51 years. For every 100 females, there were 129.6 males. For every 100 females age 18 and over, there were 134.7 males.

The median income for a household in the town was $40,714, and the median income for a family was $48,409. Males had a median income of $34,375 versus $18,750 for females. The per capita income for the town was $18,165. About 6.9% of families and 8.6% of the population were below the poverty line, including 11.3% of those under age 18 and 4.0% of those age 65 or over.
