= Douglas County Courthouse (Wisconsin) =

- U.S. National Register of Historic Places
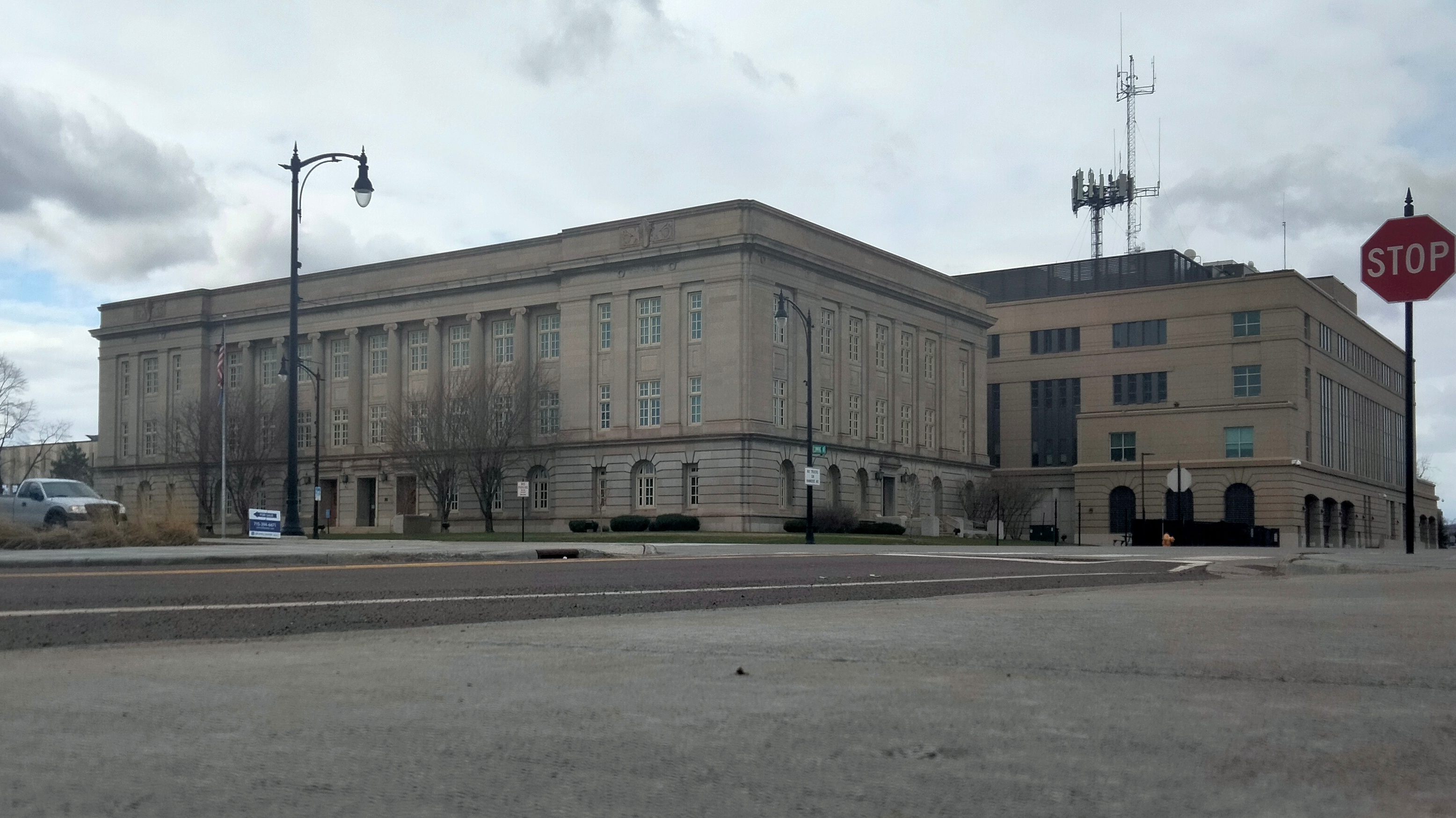

- Location within Wisconsin Location within the United States
- Interactive map showing the location for Douglas County Courthouse
- Location: 1313 Belknap Street, Superior, Wisconsin
- Coordinates: 46°43′16″N 92°5′49″W
- Area: 1.9 acres (0.77 ha)
- Built: 1918
- Architect: Royer & Radcliff
- Architectural style: Classical Revival, Neo-Classical
- MPS: County Courthouses of Wisconsin TR
- NRHP reference No.: 82000664
- Added to NRHP: March 9, 1982

The Douglas County Courthouse is an historic building located at 1313 Belknap Street in Superior, Wisconsin which was listed on the National Register of Historic Places in 1982.

Designed by Royer and Radcliff in the Classical Revival style, it was built in 1918-1919 of Bedford limestone and brick. The building has a colossal Ionic ten-column colonnade.

At the center of the interior is a three-story light court, with balconies on massive concrete, marble-faced piers.

The listing includes a jail and sheriff's residence, which is a brick building with cut stone trim. It is connected by a second-story walkway to the courthouse.
