= Boylston, Wisconsin =

- Unincorporated community
- Location within Wisconsin Location within the United States
- Coordinates: 46°35′51″N 92°07′44″W
- Country: United States
- State: Wisconsin
- County: Douglas
- Town: Superior
- Elevation: 709 ft (216 m)
- Time zone: UTC-6 (Central (CST))
  - Summer (DST): UTC-5 (CDT)
- Area codes: 715 and 534
- GNIS feature ID: 1577524

Boylston is an unincorporated community located in the town of Superior, Douglas County, Wisconsin, United States. It is along County Road C near Wisconsin Highway 35. Boylston is south of the city of Superior.

Wolves are known to frequent the area.
