= South Range, Wisconsin =

- Unincorporated community
- Location within Wisconsin Location within the United States
- Coordinates: 46°36′29″N 91°59′01″W
- Country: United States
- State: Wisconsin
- County: Douglas
- Town: Parkland
- Elevation: 761 ft (232 m)
- Time zone: UTC-6 (Central (CST))
  - Summer (DST): UTC-5 (CDT)
- Postal code: 54874
- Area codes: 715 and 534
- GNIS feature ID: 1574481

South Range is an unincorporated community, located in the town of Parkland, Douglas County, Wisconsin, United States.

South Range is located 11 miles southeast of the city of Superior, in the northwestern part of the U.S. state of Wisconsin.

The center of South Range is generally considered at the junction of County Road C and County Road K.

Wisconsin Highway 13, County Road E, County Road K, County Road C and U.S. Route 2 / U.S. Route 53 (co-signed) are the main roads in the area.

Amnicon Falls State Park is located east of South Range.

Pattison State Park and the Pattison Park Golf Course, are located west of South Range.

South Range has a post office with zip code 54874.

== Education ==
The Superior School District serves the community. Lake Superior Elementary School and Four Corners Elementary School are the area schools.
