= Superior (village), Wisconsin =

Village of Superior
- Village
- Location of the Village of Superior in Douglas County, Wisconsin

- Location of the Village of Superior in Douglas County, Wisconsin
- Coordinates: 46°39′22″N 92°6′13″W
- Country: United States
- State: Wisconsin
- County: Douglas

Area
  - Total: 1.25 sq mi (3.23 km^{2})
  - Land: 1.24 sq mi (3.22 km^{2})
  - Water: 0.0039 sq mi (0.01 km^{2})

Population (2020)
  - Total: 677
  - Density: 545/sq mi (210/km^{2})
- Time zone: UTC-6 (Central (CST))
  - Summer (DST): UTC-5 (CDT)
- Area codes: 715 and 534
- FIPS code: 55-78660
- Website: www.villageofsuperior.org

The Village of Superior is a village in Douglas County, Wisconsin, United States. The population was 677 at the 2020 census, up from 664 at the 2010 census. The village is located immediately south of, and adjacent to the City of Superior and is also adjacent to the Town of Superior.

== Transportation ==
Wisconsin Highway 35 (Tower Avenue) serves as a main route in the village. Duluth Transit Authority has one route that services Tower Avenue and can transport citizens of Superior village citizens to the larger Twin Ports Area.

== Geography ==
Superior is located at 46°39′22″N 92°6′13″W (46.65614, -92.103638).

According to the United States Census Bureau, the village has a total area of 1.24 square miles (3.21 km^{2}), of which, 1.23 square miles (3.19 km^{2}) of it is land and 0.01 square miles (0.03 km^{2}) is water.

== Demographics ==
Historical population
Census	Pop.	Note	%±
1950	339		—
1960	374		10.3%
1970	476		27.3%
1980	580		21.8%
1990	481		−17.1%
2000	500		4.0%
2010	664		32.8%
2020	677		2.0%
U.S. Decennial Census

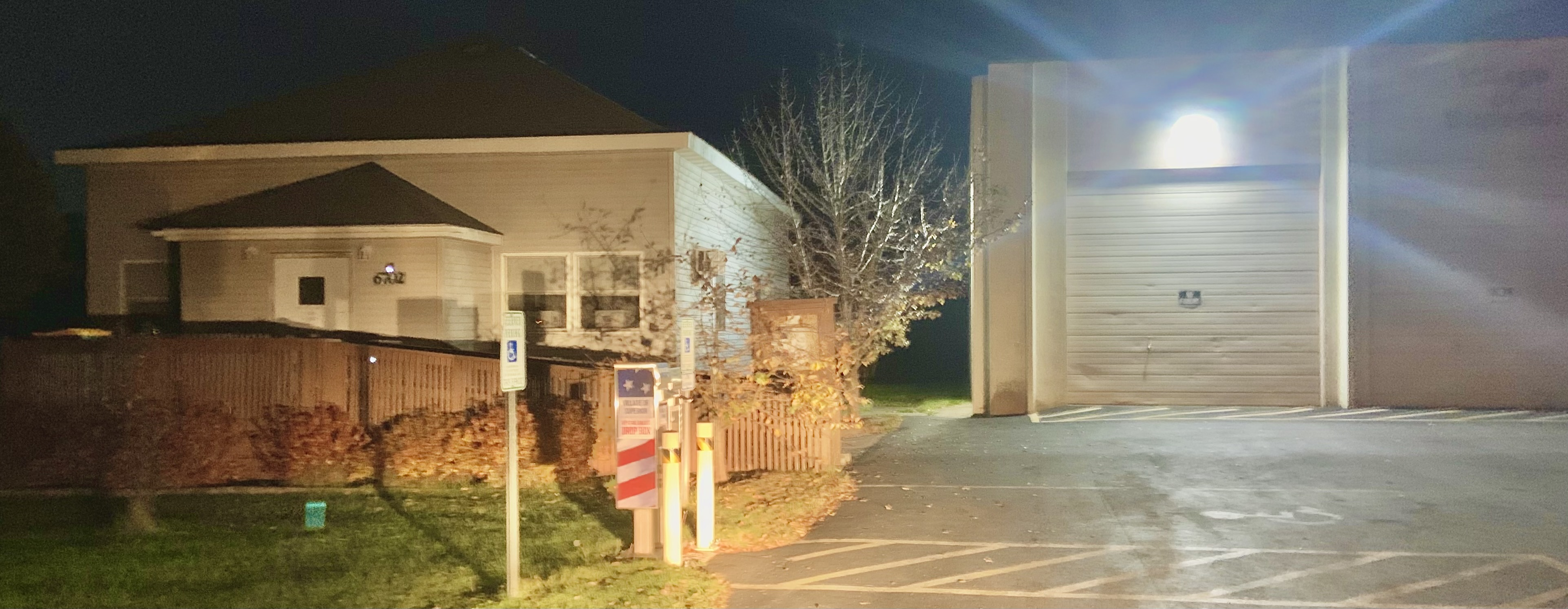
Superior Village Hall

=== 2010 census ===
As of the census of 2010, there were 664 people, 299 households, and 194 families living in the village. The population density was 539.8 inhabitants per square mile (208.4/km^{2}). There were 309 housing units at an average density of 251.2 per square mile (97.0/km^{2}). The racial makeup of the village was 97.0% White, 0.2% African American, 1.1% Native American, 0.3% Asian, 0.2% from other races, and 1.4% from two or more races. Hispanic or Latino of any race were 1.1% of the population.

There were 299 households, of which 28.8% had children under the age of 18 living with them, 51.5% were married couples living together, 9.0% had a female householder with no husband present, 4.3% had a male householder with no wife present, and 35.1% were non-families. 30.8% of all households were made up of individuals, and 18% had someone living alone who was 65 years of age or older. The average household size was 2.22 and the average family size was 2.73.

The median age in the village was 47.1 years. 20.5% of residents were under the age of 18; 4.7% were between the ages of 18 and 24; 21.2% were from 25 to 44; 33.1% were from 45 to 64; and 20.5% were 65 years of age or older. The gender makeup of the village was 48.2% male and 51.8% female.

=== 2000 census ===
As of the census of 2000, there were 500 people, 209 households, and 158 families living in the village. The population density was 404.7 people per square mile (155.7/km^{2}). There were 210 housing units at an average density of 170.0/sq mi (65.4/km^{2}). The racial makeup of the village was 96.80% White, 0.60% Black or African American, 1.00% Native American, 1.20% Asian, 0.20% from other races, and 0.20% from two or more races. 0.20% of the population were Hispanic or Latino of any race. 17.1% were of German, 15.1% Swedish, 11.4% Norwegian, 11.1% Polish, 10.3% Finnish, 7.1% Irish and 6.0% French ancestry according to Census 2000.

There were 209 households, out of which 30.6% had children under the age of 18 living with them, 63.2% were married couples living together, 10.0% had a female householder with no husband present, and 24.4% were non-families. 20.6% of all households were made up of individuals, and 11.0% had someone living alone who was 65 years of age or older. The average household size was 2.39 and the average family size was 2.76.

In the village, the population was spread out, with 21.0% under the age of 18, 8.4% from 18 to 24, 25.4% from 25 to 44, 28.6% from 45 to 64, and 16.6% who were 65 years of age or older. The median age was 43 years. For every 100 females, there were 94.6 males. For every 100 females age 18 and over, there were 98.5 males.

The median income for a household in the village was $60,092, and the median income for a family was $72,385. Males had a median income of $59,722 versus $15,625 for females. The per capita income for the village was $39,328. About 0.7% of families and 0.8% of the population were below the poverty line, including none of those under the age of eighteen or sixty-five or over.
