= Dobie, Douglas County, Wisconsin =

Dobie, Wisconsin
- Unincorporated community
- Location within Wisconsin Location within the United States
- Coordinates: 46°31′36″N 91°48′17″W
- Country: United States
- State: Wisconsin
- County: Douglas
- Town: Hawthorne
- Elevation: 1,138 ft (347 m)
- Time zone: UTC-6 (Central (CST))
  - Summer (DST): UTC-5 (CDT)
- Area codes: 715 and 534
- GNIS feature ID: 1577574

Dobie is an unincorporated community located in the town of Hawthorne, Douglas County, Wisconsin, United States. It is near Lake Nebagamon.
