= Rockmont, Wisconsin =

- Unincorporated community
- Location within Wisconsin Location within the United States
- Coordinates: 46°35′09″N 91°54′32″W
- Country: United States
- State: Wisconsin
- County: Douglas
- Town: Amnicon
- Elevation: 981 ft (299 m)
- Time zone: UTC-6 (Central (CST))
  - Summer (DST): UTC-5 (CDT)
- Area codes: 715 and 534
- GNIS feature ID: 1577794

Rockmont is an unincorporated community located in the town of Amnicon, Douglas County, Wisconsin, United States.

== History ==
A post office called Rockmont was established in 1897, and remained in operation until it was discontinued in 1911. The community took its name from a rocky mound nearby.
