= Superior (town), Wisconsin =

Town of Superior
- Town
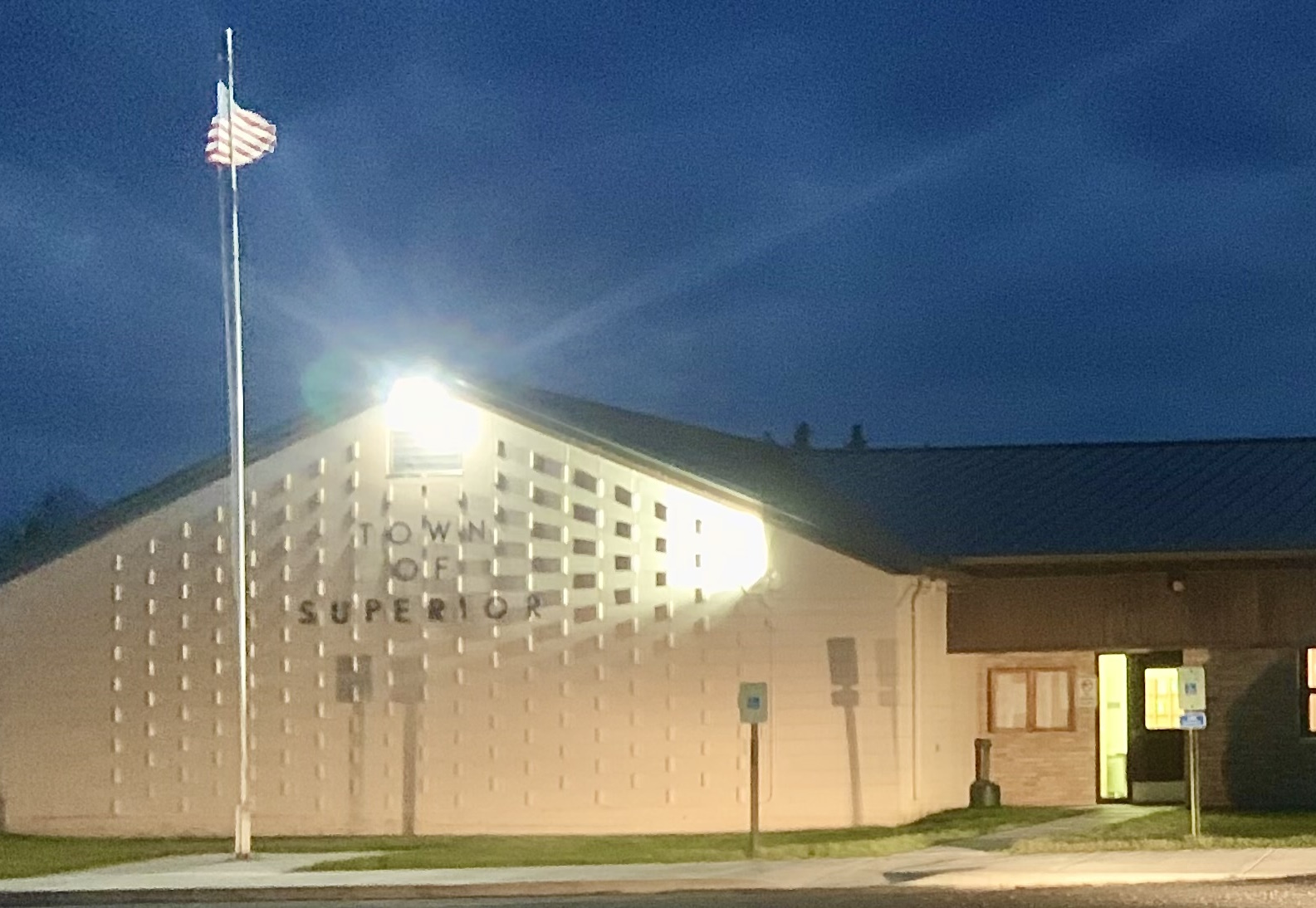
- Town hall

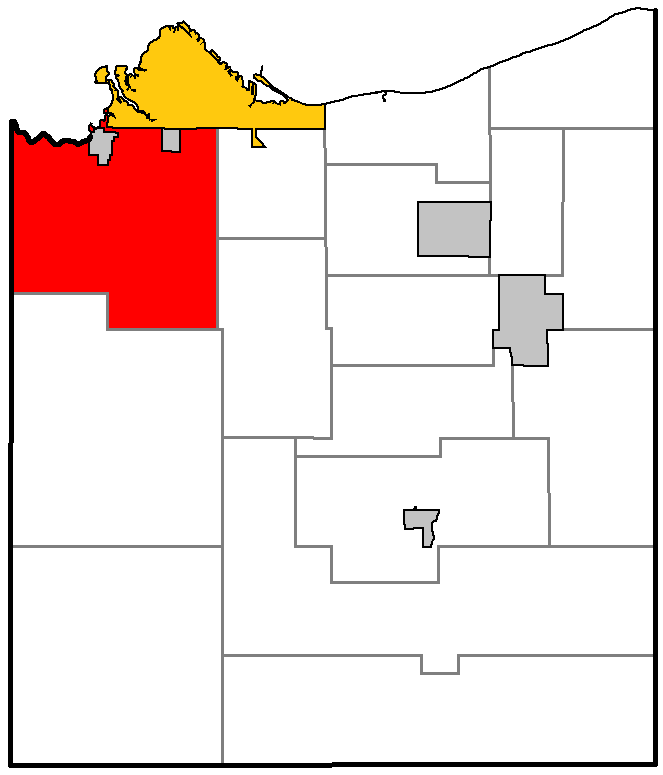
- Location of Superior, within Douglas County
- Coordinates: 46°35′32″N 92°8′11″W
- Country: United States
- State: Wisconsin
- County: Douglas

Area
  - Total: 107.8 sq mi (279.1 km^{2})
  - Land: 106.2 sq mi (275.0 km^{2})
  - Water: 1.5 sq mi (4.0 km^{2})
- Elevation: 741 ft (226 m)

Population (2020)
  - Total: 2,264
  - Density: 21.32/sq mi (8.233/km^{2})
- Time zone: UTC-6 (Central (CST))
  - Summer (DST): UTC-5 (CDT)
- Area codes: 715 and 534
- FIPS code: 55-78675
- GNIS feature ID: 1584259
- Website: https://www.townofsuperiorwi.gov/

The Town of Superior is a town in Douglas County, Wisconsin, United States. The population was 2,264 at the 2020 US census, up from 2,058 at the 2000 census. The Village of Superior is located within the town. The City of Superior is located immediately north and adjacent to both the Town of Superior and the Village of Superior.

== Geography ==
According to the United States Census Bureau, the town has a total area of 107.8 square miles (279.1 km^{2}), of which 106.2 square miles (275.1 km^{2}) is land and 1.6 square miles (4.0 km^{2}) (1.45%) is water.

The Nemadji River flows, roughly diagonally, through the Town of Superior from southwest to northeast. The river ultimately flows into the bay at Lake Superior, within the city of Superior, at Allouez and East End.

Pattison State Park is located within the southeastern portion of the Town of Superior.

=== Unincorporated communities ===
The following unincorporated communities are located within the Town of Superior :

- Ambridge
- Anton
- Black River
- Borea
- Boylston
- Boylston Junction
- Carnegie
- Dedham
- Dewey
- Four Corners
- Pokegama
- Riverview
- Saunders
- Sunnyside

== Demographics ==
As of the census of 2000, there were 2,058 people, 764 households, and 605 families residing in the town. The population density was 19.4 people per square mile (7.5/km^{2}). There were 794 housing units at an average density of 7.5 per square mile (2.9/km^{2}). The racial makeup of the town was 98.01% White, 0.24% Black or African American, 1.02% Native American, 0.10% Asian, and 0.63% from two or more races. 0.49% of the population were Hispanic or Latino of any race. 23.0% were of German, 19.6% Norwegian, 11.6% Swedish, 7.8% Irish, 7.5% Finnish and 6.0% Polish ancestry according to Census 2000.

There were 764 households, out of which 35.6% had children under the age of 18 living with them, 71.9% were married couples living together, 4.1% had a female householder with no husband present, and 20.8% were non-families. 17.0% of all households were made up of individuals, and 5.1% had someone living alone who was 65 years of age or older. The average household size was 2.69 and the average family size was 3.05.

In the town, the population was spread out, with 26.0% under the age of 18, 6.2% from 18 to 24, 29.0% from 25 to 44, 28.8% from 45 to 64, and 10.0% who were 65 years of age or older. The median age was 40 years. For every 100 females, there were 105.4 males. For every 100 females age 18 and over, there were 101.6 males.

The median income for a household in the town was $48,833, and the median income for a family was $51,090. Males had a median income of $35,813 versus $26,800 for females. The per capita income for the town was $18,775. About 4.7% of families and 6.9% of the population were below the poverty line, including 9.6% of those under age 18 and 5.5% of those age 65 or over.

== Transportation ==
Wisconsin Highway 35 (Tower Avenue) and Wisconsin Highway 105 are two of the main routes within the Town of Superior. Other main routes include County Roads A, B, C, and W. County Road A runs north–south through the eastern portion of the town. County Road B runs east–west through the southern portion of the town near Pattison State Park. County Road C runs east–west through the central and northeastern portions of the town. County Road W runs both north–south and east–west in the western portion of the town. County Road Z briefly enters the town in the northeast corner, near its intersection with County Road A.

Minnesota Highway 23 crosses the Saint Louis River into Wisconsin; within the northwestern corner of the Town of Superior; near the Mont Du Lac Recreation Ski Area; and continues for half a mile (0.8 km) before crossing back into Minnesota.
