= Gordon, Douglas County, Wisconsin =

Gordon, Wisconsin
- Town
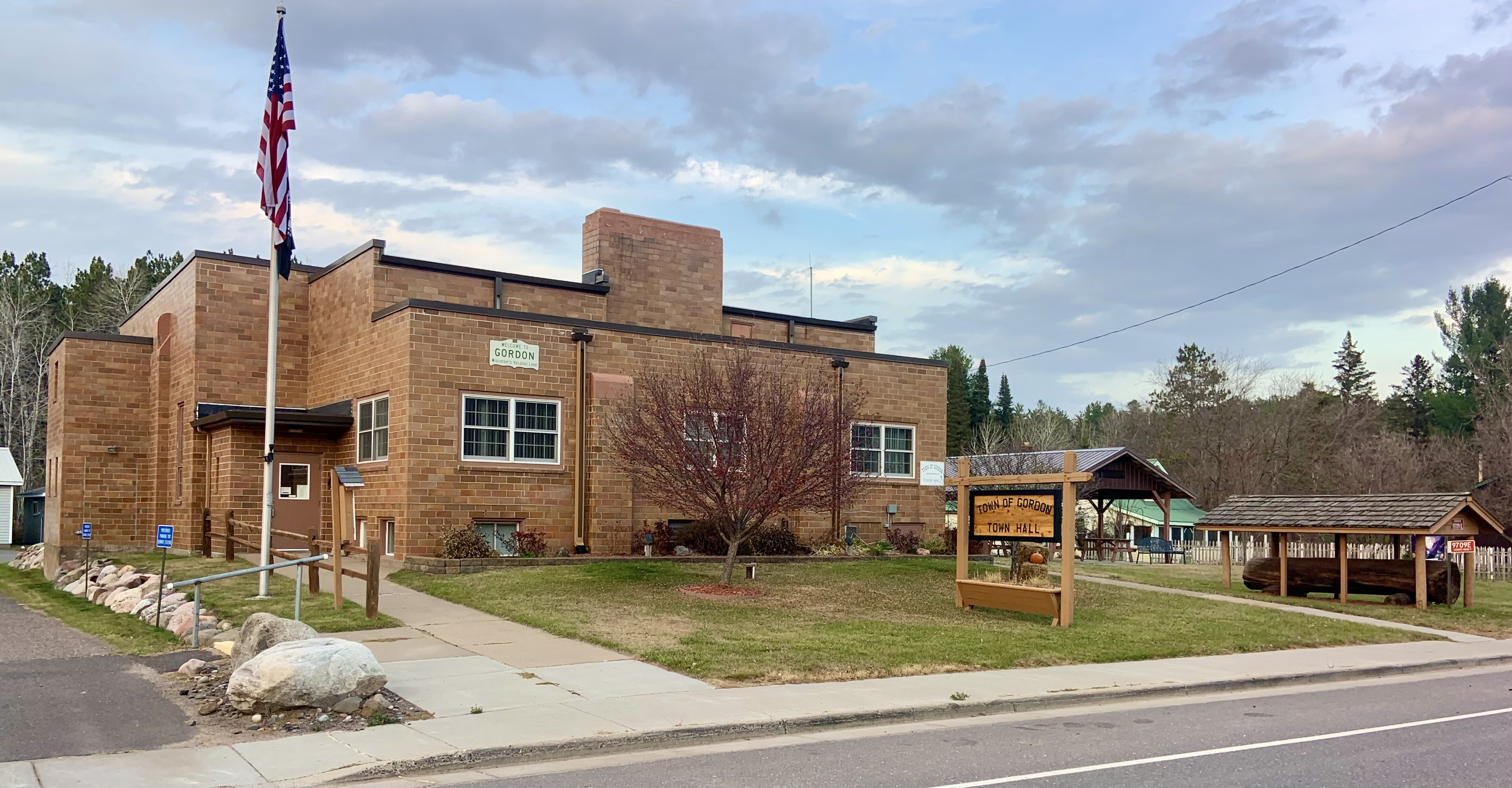
- Town hall

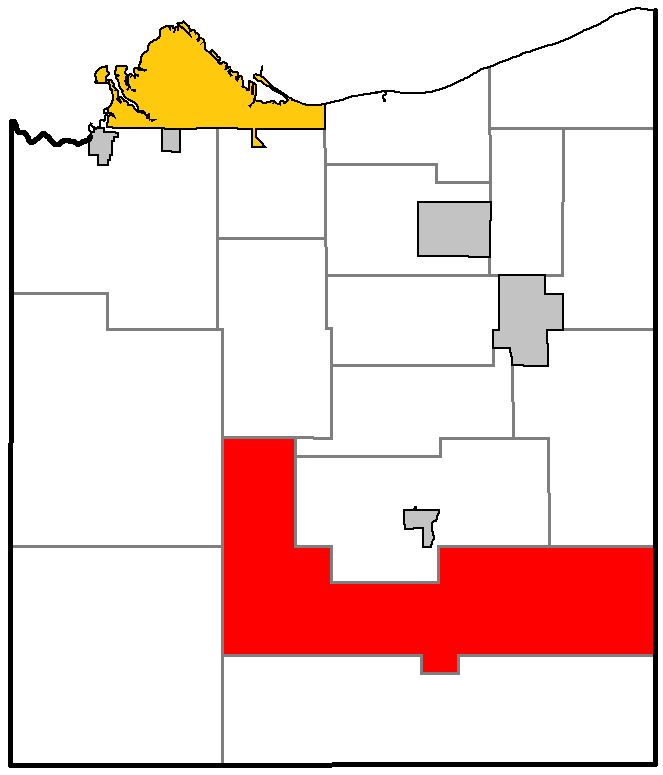
- Location of Gordon, within Douglas County
- Coordinates: 46°16′47″N 91°46′49″W
- Country: United States
- State: Wisconsin
- County: Douglas

Area
  - Total: 157.4 sq mi (407.7 km^{2})
  - Land: 151.7 sq mi (393.0 km^{2})
  - Water: 5.6 sq mi (14.6 km^{2})
- Elevation: 1,080 ft (330 m)

Population (2020)
  - Total: 757
  - Density: 4.99/sq mi (1.93/km^{2})
- Time zone: UTC-6 (Central (CST))
  - Summer (DST): UTC-5 (CDT)
- Zip code: 54838
- Area codes: 715 and 534
- FIPS code: 55-29925
- GNIS feature ID: 1583292
- Website: https://gordonwi-douglas.gov/

Gordon is a town in Douglas County, Wisconsin, United States. The population was 757 at the 2020 census. The census-designated place of Gordon is located in the town. It was historically known as "Amick" (Amik in Ojibwe), meaning beaver, indicating the town's significant fur-trading post alongside the Eau Claire River. The area became known as "Gordon" after half-Ojibwe, half-French pioneer and founder Antoine Gordon, who set up his convenience store and eventual commune next to the canoe stop. His place served as a landmark and rest stop for travelers.

== Transportation ==
U.S. Highway 53 serves as a main route in the town.

== Geography ==
According to the United States Census Bureau, the town has a total area of 157.4 square miles (407.7 km^{2}), of which 151.8 square miles (393.1 km^{2}) is land and 5.6 square miles (14.6 km^{2}) (3.58%) is water.

=== Climate ===
Climate data for Gordon, Wisconsin (1991–2020 normals, extremes 1951–present)
Month	Jan	Feb	Mar	Apr	May	Jun	Jul	Aug	Sep	Oct	Nov	Dec	Year
Record high °F (°C)	51 (11)	58 (14)	79 (26)	92 (33)	95 (35)	98 (37)	102 (39)	102 (39)	98 (37)	87 (31)	74 (23)	59 (15)	102 (39)
Mean daily maximum °F (°C)	19.9 (−6.7)	25.6 (−3.6)	38.2 (3.4)	51.6 (10.9)	66.0 (18.9)	75.1 (23.9)	79.4 (26.3)	77.2 (25.1)	68.8 (20.4)	54.2 (12.3)	37.8 (3.2)	25.0 (−3.9)	51.6 (10.9)
Daily mean °F (°C)	9.7 (−12.4)	14.2 (−9.9)	26.9 (−2.8)	40.2 (4.6)	53.6 (12.0)	63.1 (17.3)	67.8 (19.9)	65.5 (18.6)	57.1 (13.9)	43.9 (6.6)	29.5 (−1.4)	16.7 (−8.5)	40.7 (4.8)
Mean daily minimum °F (°C)	−0.5 (−18.1)	2.9 (−16.2)	15.7 (−9.1)	28.8 (−1.8)	41.2 (5.1)	51.1 (10.6)	56.2 (13.4)	53.8 (12.1)	45.4 (7.4)	33.6 (0.9)	21.2 (−6.0)	8.4 (−13.1)	29.8 (−1.2)
Record low °F (°C)	−48 (−44)	−46 (−43)	−42 (−41)	−8 (−22)	7 (−14)	26 (−3)	31 (−1)	26 (−3)	18 (−8)	4 (−16)	−33 (−36)	−44 (−42)	−48 (−44)
Average precipitation inches (mm)	0.96 (24)	0.97 (25)	1.56 (40)	2.88 (73)	3.78 (96)	4.25 (108)	4.80 (122)	4.18 (106)	3.76 (96)	3.20 (81)	1.70 (43)	1.33 (34)	33.37 (848)
Average snowfall inches (cm)	10.3 (26)	10.3 (26)	10.4 (26)	5.8 (15)	0.3 (0.76)	0.0 (0.0)	0.0 (0.0)	0.0 (0.0)	0.0 (0.0)	0.9 (2.3)	8.9 (23)	12.8 (33)	59.7 (152)
Average precipitation days (≥ 0.01 in)	9.6	7.4	8.5	10.5	12.2	12.4	11.4	10.3	10.7	11.5	8.3	9.5	122.3
Average snowy days (≥ 0.1 in)	9.4	7.5	5.4	2.6	0.3	0.0	0.0	0.0	0.0	0.9	5.1	8.8	40.0
Source: NOAA

== Demographics ==
As of the census of 2000, there were 645 people, 298 households, and 188 families residing in the town. The population density was 4.3 people per square mile (1.6/km^{2}). There were 471 housing units at an average density of 3.1 per square mile (1.2/km^{2}). The racial makeup of the town was 95.35% White, 0.31% African American, 1.55% Native American, 0.16% Asian, 0.62% from other races, and 2.02% from two or more races. Hispanic or Latino of any race were 0.62% of the population.

There were 298 households, out of which 21.5% had children under the age of 18 living with them, 52.7% were married couples living together, 5.4% had a female householder with no husband present, and 36.6% were non-families. 31.9% of all households were made up of individuals, and 14.1% had someone living alone who was 65 years of age or older. The average household size was 2.16 and the average family size was 2.68.

In the town, the population was spread out, with 19.7% under the age of 18, 5.0% from 18 to 24, 26.2% from 25 to 44, 29.9% from 45 to 64, and 19.2% who were 65 years of age or older. The median age was 45 years. For every 100 females, there were 109.4 males. For every 100 females age 18 and over, there were 112.3 males.

The median income for a household in the town was $34,412, and the median income for a family was $35,972. Males had a median income of $31,827 versus $19,844 for females. The per capita income for the town was $18,065. About 7.1% of families and 8.0% of the population were below the poverty line, including 9.1% of those under age 18 and 13.8% of those age 65 or over.

== Notable people ==
- Philip B. Gordon, Roman Catholic priest, was born in the town
