= Solon Springs, Wisconsin =

- Village
- Location of the Village of Solon Springs in Douglas County, Wisconsin

- Location within Wisconsin Location within the United States
- Coordinates: 46°21′17″N 91°48′1″W
- Country: United States
- State: Wisconsin
- County: Douglas

Area
  - Total: 2.30 sq mi (5.95 km^{2})
  - Land: 1.57 sq mi (4.06 km^{2})
  - Water: 0.73 sq mi (1.90 km^{2})
- Elevation: 1,122 ft (342 m)

Population (2020)
  - Total: 656
  - Density: 418/sq mi (162/km^{2})
- Time zone: UTC-6 (Central (CST))
  - Summer (DST): UTC-5 (CDT)
- Area codes: 715 and 534
- FIPS code: 55-74575
- GNIS feature ID: 1574366
- Website: www.villageofsolonsprings.com

Solon Springs is a village in Douglas County, Wisconsin, United States. The population was 656 at the 2020 census, up from 600 at the 2010 census. The village is surrounded by the Town of Solon Springs.

== History ==
Solon Springs was first called White Birch, from a grove of white birch trees near the original town site. The present name of Solon Springs honors Thomas F. Solon, who discovered mineral springs here. A post office was established as White Birch in 1885, and the name of the post office was changed to Solon Springs in 1896.

== Geography ==
Solon Springs is located at 46°21′3″N 91°49′5″W (46.351049, -91.818139).

According to the United States Census Bureau, the village has a total area of 2.30 square miles (5.96 km^{2}), of which 1.57 square miles (4.07 km^{2}) is land and 0.73 square miles (1.89 km^{2}) is water.

Solon Springs is located 32 miles southeast of the city of Superior.

== Demographics ==
Historical population
Census	Pop.	Note	%±
1930	282		—
1940	392		39.0%
1950	480		22.4%
1960	530		10.4%
1970	598		12.8%
1980	590		−1.3%
1990	575		−2.5%
2000	576		0.2%
2010	600		4.2%
2020	656		9.3%
U.S. Decennial Census

As of 2000 the median income for a household in the village was $30,250, and the median income for a family was $46,875. Males had a median income of $30,500 versus $23,438 for females. The per capita income for the village was $16,807. About 3.7% of families and 10.6% of the population were below the poverty line, including 9.3% of those under age 18 and 8.6% of those age 65 or over.

=== 2010 census ===
As of the census of 2010, there were 600 people, 263 households, and 168 families residing in the village. The population density was 382.2 inhabitants per square mile (147.6/km^{2}). There were 408 housing units at an average density of 259.9 units per square mile (100.3 units/km^{2}). The racial makeup of the village was 97.5% White, 0.2% African American, 1.3% Native American, and 1.0% from two or more races. Hispanic or Latino of any race were 0.7% of the population.

There were 263 households, of which 25.9% had children under the age of 18 living with them, 50.2% were married couples living together, 9.9% had a female householder with no husband present, 3.8% had a male householder with no wife present, and 36.1% were non-families. 28.9% of all households were made up of individuals, and 14.8% had someone living alone who was 65 years of age or older. The average household size was 2.28 and the average family size was 2.81.

The median age in the village was 43.1 years. 23.2% of residents were under the age of 18; 5.9% were between the ages of 18 and 24; 23.9% were from 25 to 44; 31.4% were from 45 to 64; and 15.7% were 65 years of age or older. The gender makeup of the village was 48.5% male and 51.5% female.

== Transportation ==
=== Major highways ===
U.S. Highway 53 serves as a main route in the community. The main route, however, now bypasses the village and the original portion of highway that still exists in Solon Springs is referred to as "Business 53".

=== Airport ===
Solon Springs Municipal Airport (KOLG) serves the village and surrounding communities.

== Education ==
The Solon Springs School District serves the village and the surrounding town.
