= Burnett, Minnesota =

Burnett
- Unincorporated community
- Location within Minnesota Location within the United States
- Coordinates: 46°54′03″N 92°31′28″W
- Country: United States
- State: Minnesota
- County: Saint Louis
- Township: Industrial Township
- Elevation: 1,312 ft (400 m)

Population
  - Total: 20
- Time zone: UTC-6 (Central (CST))
  - Summer (DST): UTC-5 (CDT)
- ZIP code: 55779
- Area code: 218
- GNIS feature ID: 660912

Burnett is an unincorporated community in Industrial Township, Saint Louis County, Minnesota, United States.

The community is located 25 miles northwest of the city of Duluth at the intersection of Industrial Road (County 7) and Center Line Road.

State Highway 33 (MN 33) is nearby. The Cloquet River flows through the community.

The communities of Alborn, Culver, Independence, and Brookston are all near Burnett.

A post office called Burnett was established in 1896, and remained in operation until 1982. The community was named for a railroad official.
