= Alborn, Minnesota =

Alborn
- Unincorporated community
- Location within Minnesota Location within the United States
- Coordinates: 46°58′23″N 92°34′34″W
- Country: United States
- State: Minnesota
- County: Saint Louis
- Township: Alborn Township
- Elevation: 1,302 ft (397 m)

Population
  - Total: 10
- Time zone: UTC-6 (Central (CST))
  - Summer (DST): UTC-5 (CDT)
- ZIP codes: 55702
- Area code: 218
- GNIS feature ID: 660640

Alborn (/ˈælbərn/ AL-bərn) is an unincorporated community in Alborn Township, Saint Louis County, Minnesota, United States.

The community of Alborn is located 29 miles northwest of the city of Duluth; and five miles west of U.S. 53 at Independence. Nearby places include Prosit, Culver, Burnett, Brookston, and Independence.

The center of Alborn is generally considered at the junction of Saint Louis County Highway 7 (CR 7) and County Highway 47 (CR 47); located in the eastern portion of Alborn Township (population 460). The Artichoke River flows through the community.

== See also ==
- Alborn Township
