= Munger, Minnesota =

Munger
- Unincorporated community
- Location within Minnesota Location within the United States
- Coordinates: 46°48′03″N 92°20′38″W
- Country: United States
- State: Minnesota
- County: Saint Louis
- Township: Solway Township
- Elevation: 1,365 ft (416 m)

Population
  - Total: 30
- Time zone: UTC-6 (Central (CST))
  - Summer (DST): UTC-5 (CDT)
- ZIP code: 55720
- Area code: 218
- GNIS feature ID: 662009

Munger is an unincorporated community in Solway Township, Saint Louis County, Minnesota, United States.

The community is located 11 miles west of the city of Duluth at the junction of U.S. Highway 2 and County Road 223 (Munger Shaw Road). Munger is located seven miles west of the city of Proctor.

== History ==
A post office called Munger was established in 1903, and remained in operation until 1931. The community was named for Roger S. Munger, a businessperson in the mining industry.

== Community ==
The unincorporated community of Munger is located within Solway Township (population 1,944).

Most of Munger is located in Saint Louis County; however, the mailing address for most of Munger is Cloquet, which is in adjacent Carlton County.

Munger also includes a handful of churches, including Hope Lutheran Church (LCMS).

=== Nearby places ===
- The Willard Munger Trail
- Spirit Mountain Ski Recreation Area

=== Nearby cities and communities ===
- Duluth
- Hermantown
- Proctor
- Simar
- Saginaw
- Twig
- Esko
