= Canyon, Minnesota =

Canyon
- Unincorporated community
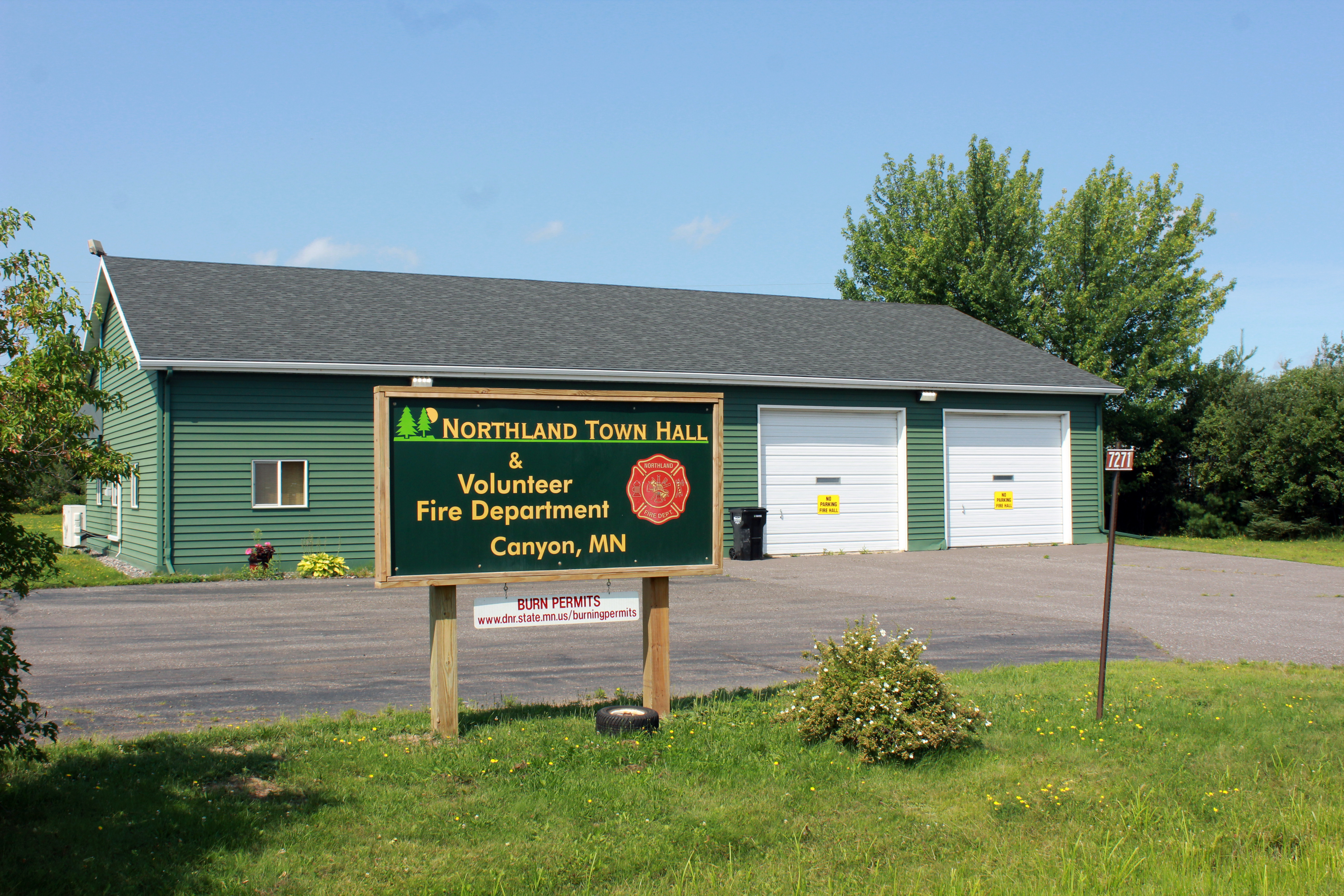
- Northland Town Hall & Volunteer Fire Department

- Location within Minnesota Location within the United States
- Coordinates: 47°02′24″N 92°28′15″W
- Country: United States
- State: Minnesota
- County: Saint Louis
- Township: Northland Township
- Elevation: 1,355 ft (413 m)

Population
  - Total: 40
- Time zone: UTC-6 (Central (CST))
  - Summer (DST): UTC-5 (CDT)
- ZIP code: 55717
- Area code: 218
- GNIS feature ID: 660955

Canyon is an unincorporated community in Northland Township, Saint Louis County, Minnesota, United States.

The community is located 27 miles north of the city of Duluth at the junction of U.S. Highway 53 and Harris Road (County Road 737).

Canyon is located between the cities of Duluth and Virginia on U.S. Highway 53.

Hellwig Creek flows through the community.

== History ==
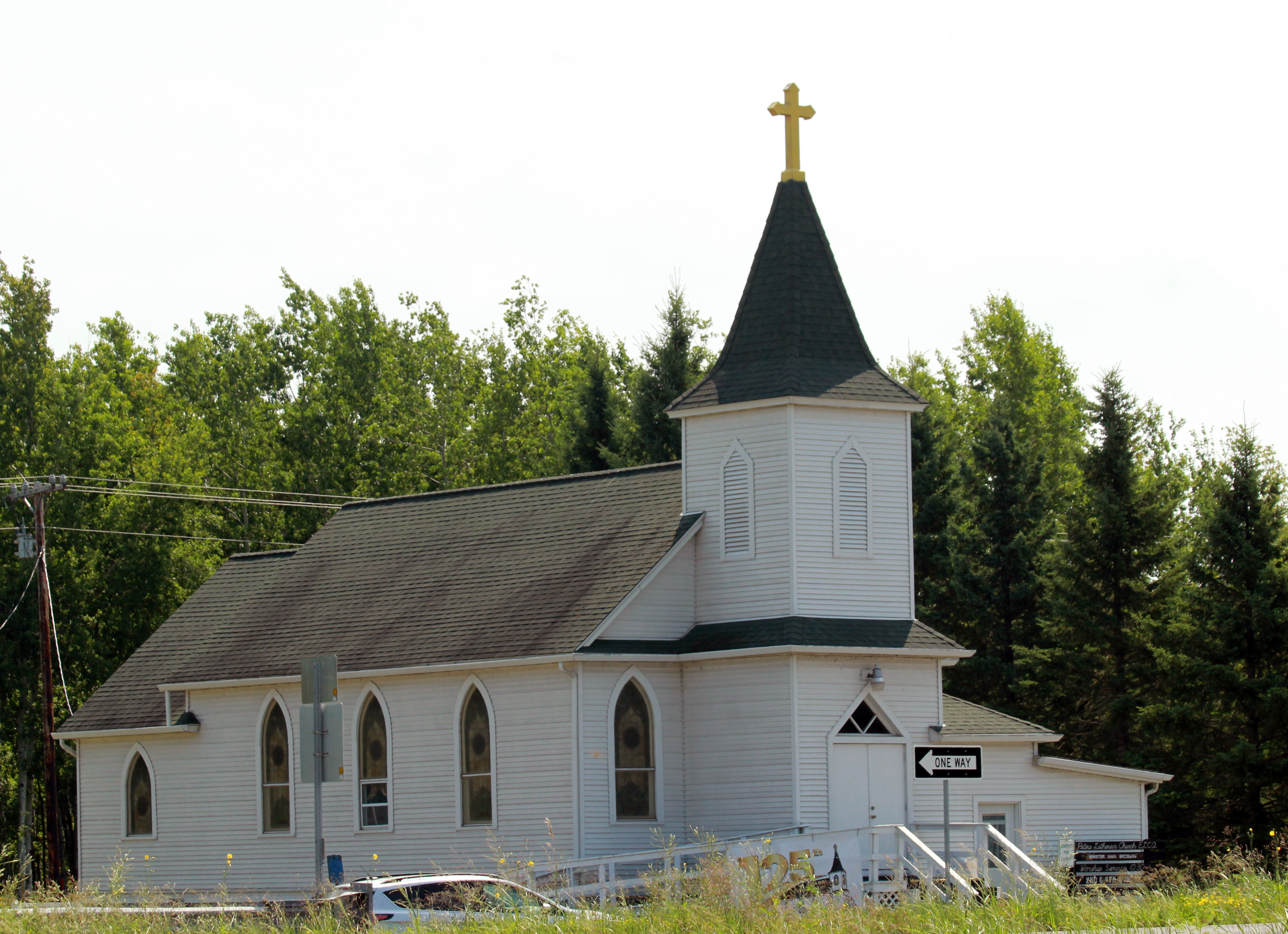
St. Peter's Lutheran Church

Canyon was regarded as a hamlet in the 1920s, with a population of 83.

By the 1940s, Canyon's population was estimated at 100.
