= Four Corners, Minnesota =

Four Corners Pike Lake Business District of Canosia Township
- Unincorporated community
- Location within Minnesota Location within the United States
- Coordinates: 46°51′12″N 92°16′49″W
- Country: United States
- State: Minnesota
- County: Saint Louis
- Township: Canosia Township
- Elevation: 1,460 ft (450 m)

Population
  - Total: 90
- Time zone: UTC-6 (Central (CST))
  - Summer (DST): UTC-5 (CDT)
- ZIP code: 55811
- Area code: 218
- GNIS feature ID: 661309

Four Corners is an unincorporated community in Saint Louis County, Minnesota, United States; located 10 miles northwest of the city of Duluth at the junction of U.S. Highway 53 and Saint Louis County Road 13 (Midway Road).

Four Corners is more commonly known in the present day as the Pike Lake business district of Canosia Township.

Four Corners is located near the survey point boundary line for Canosia Township, the city of Hermantown, Grand Lake Township, and Solway Township. The actual survey point boundary line where the three townships and the city of Hermantown meet is located nearby at the intersection of Seville Road and Solway Road.

State Highway 194 (MN 194) and Martin Road (County Road 9) are also near Four Corners – Pike Lake business district.
