= Pine River (Saint Louis River tributary) =

Pine River White Pine River
- Mouth of Pine River

Location
- Country: United States
- State: Minnesota
- County: St. Louis County, Minnesota

Physical characteristics
- Source
  - location: Adolph
  - coordinates: 46.8621622°N 92.2671343°W
- Mouth
  - location: Saginaw, Minnesota
  - coordinates: 46°47′12″N 92°27′27″W
- Length: 15.0 mi-long (24.1 km)

Basin features
- River system: St. Louis River

The Pine River, also known as the White Pine River, is a 15.0-mile-long (24.1 km) tributary of the Saint Louis River in Minnesota, United States.

The White Pine River flows through Grand Lake Township, Solway Township, and Brevator Township. The river is located west and northwest of Duluth, and north of Cloquet. The river is located entirely within southern Saint Louis County.

== See also ==
- List of rivers of Minnesota
