= Northland Township, St. Louis County, Minnesota =

Northland Township, Minnesota
- Township
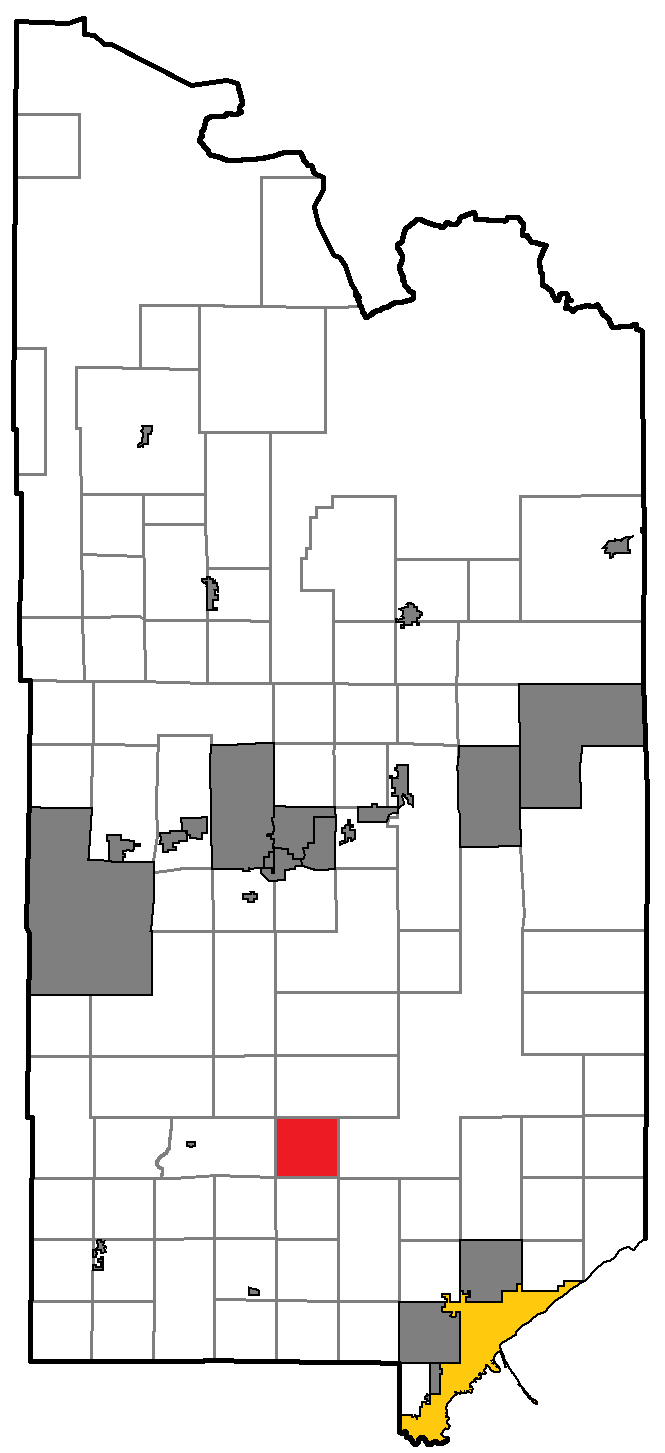
- Location of Northland Township within St. Louis County, Minnesota
- Coordinates: 47°3′9″N 92°28′27″W
- Country: United States
- State: Minnesota
- County: Saint Louis

Area
  - Total: 35.4 sq mi (91.7 km^{2})
  - Land: 34.7 sq mi (89.9 km^{2})
  - Water: 0.66 sq mi (1.7 km^{2})
- Elevation: 1,350 ft (410 m)

Population (2020)
  - Total: 155
  - Density: 4.47/sq mi (1.72/km^{2})
- Time zone: UTC-6 (Central (CST))
  - Summer (DST): UTC-5 (CDT)
- ZIP codes: 55717
- Area code: 218
- FIPS code: 27-47050
- GNIS feature ID: 0665160

Northland Township is a township in Saint Louis County, Minnesota, United States. The population was 155 at the 2020 census.

U.S. Highway 53 serves as a main route in the township.

The community of Canyon is located within Northland Township.

Canyon is located 27 miles north of the city of Duluth at the junction of U.S. Highway 53 and Harris Road (County Road 737).

== Geography ==
According to the United States Census Bureau, the township has a total area of 35.4 square miles (92 km^{2}); 34.7 square miles (90 km^{2}) is land and 0.7 square miles (1.8 km^{2}), or 1.89%, is water.

Hellwig Creek flows through the eastern portion of Northland Township.

=== Adjacent townships ===
The following are adjacent to Northland Township :

- New Independence Township (south)
- Cotton Township (north)
- Meadowlands Township (west)
- Alborn Township (southwest)
- Kelsey Township (northwest)
- Whiteface Reservoir Unorganized Territory (east)

The extreme eastern portion of Northland Township is located within the Cloquet Valley State Forest of Saint Louis County.

U.S. Highway 53 runs north–south through the township.

Saint Louis County Highway 133 (CR 133) runs east–west through the middle of Northland Township; the roadway continues west to Meadowlands.

County Road 232 runs east–west through the northwest portion of the township.

County Road 49 runs east–west through the northeast portion of Northland Township.

County Road 737 (Harris Road) runs east–west through the southeast portion of the township.

County Road 725 (Birch Road) runs east–west along Northland Township's southern boundary line with adjacent New Independence Township.

=== Unincorporated communities ===
- Canyon

== Demographics ==
As of the census of 2000, there were 161 people, 69 households, and 50 families living in the township. The population density was 4.6 people per square mile (1.8/km^{2}). There were 142 housing units at an average density of 4.1/sq mi (1.6/km^{2}). The racial makeup of the township was 100.00% White. Hispanic or Latino of any race were 0.62% of the population.

There were 69 households, out of which 27.5% had children under the age of 18 living with them, 60.9% were married couples living together, 7.2% had a female householder with no husband present, and 27.5% were non-families. 20.3% of all households were made up of individuals, and 4.3% had someone living alone who was 65 years of age or older. The average household size was 2.33 and the average family size was 2.72.

In the township the population was spread out, with 21.1% under the age of 18, 5.6% from 18 to 24, 28.6% from 25 to 44, 33.5% from 45 to 64, and 11.2% who were 65 years of age or older. The median age was 42 years. For every 100 females, there were 114.7 males. For every 100 females age 18 and over, there were 108.2 males.

The median income for a household in the township was $49,375, and the median income for a family was $57,500. Males had a median income of $46,250 versus $25,625 for females. The per capita income for the township was $21,136. About 18.8% of families and 15.6% of the population were below the poverty line, including 16.2% of those under the age of eighteen and none of those 65 or over.
