= Mahnomen, St. Louis County, Minnesota =

Census-designated place in Minnesota, US

Mahnomen
- Census-designated place (CDP) and Unincorporated community
- Location within Minnesota
- Coordinates: 46°46′23″N 92°32′30″W
- Country: United States
- State: Minnesota
- County: Saint Louis
- Township: Brevator Township

Area
  - Total: 1.27 sq mi (3.29 km^{2})
  - Land: 1.27 sq mi (3.29 km^{2})
  - Water: 0 sq mi (0.00 km^{2})
- Elevation: 1,283 ft (391 m)

Population (2020)
  - Total: 231
  - Density: 182/sq mi (70.2/km^{2})
- Time zone: UTC-6 (Central (CST))
  - Summer (DST): UTC-5 (CDT)
- Area code: 218
- FIPS code: 27-39394
- GNIS feature ID: 2583777

Mahnomen is an unincorporated community and census-designated place (CDP) in Brevator Township, Saint Louis County, Minnesota, United States. Its population was 239 as of the 2010 census.

Mahnomen is located in the southern portion of Brevator Township near Cloquet. The community is located between Brookston and Cloquet. The Saint Louis River flows through the community.

The center of Mahnomen is generally considered at the intersection of Mahnomen Road and Brookston Road.

== Demographics ==
Historical population
Census	Pop.	Note	%±
2020	231		—
U.S. Decennial Census
