= Grand Lake Township, St. Louis County, Minnesota =

Grand Lake Township, Minnesota
- Township
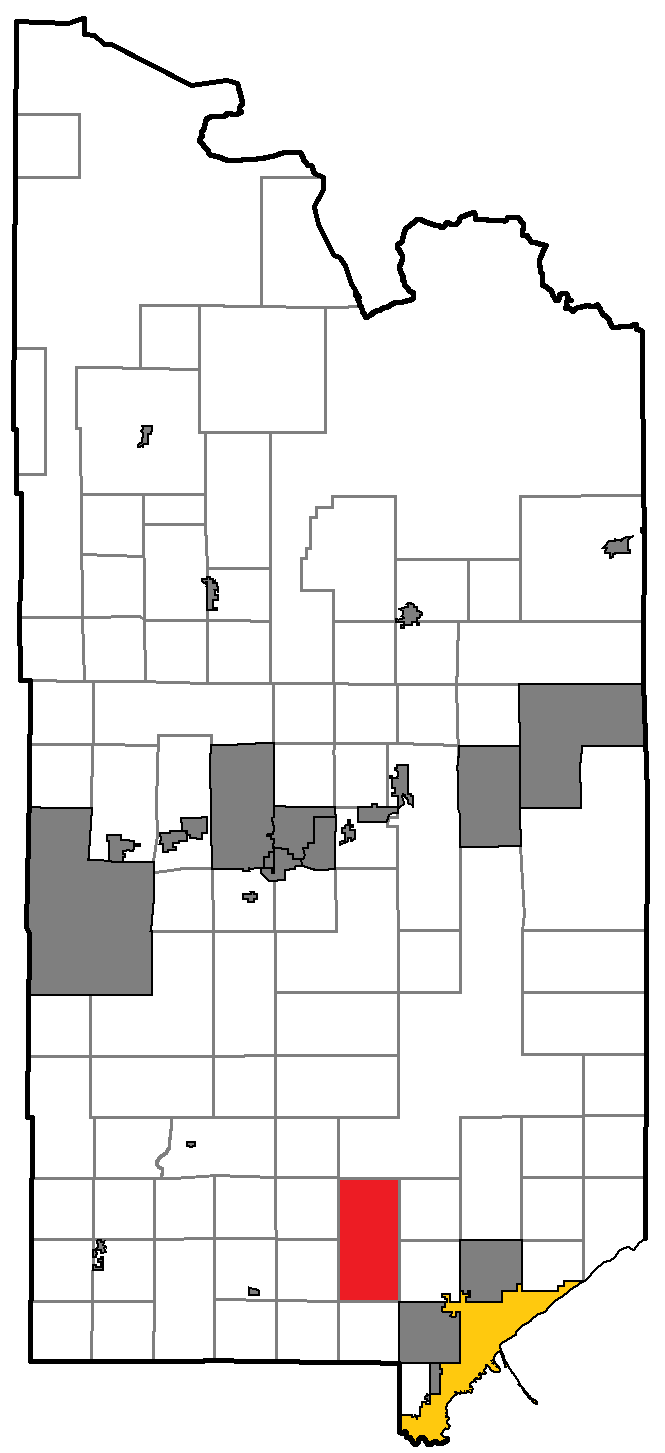
- Location of Grand Lake Township within St. Louis County, Minnesota
- Coordinates: 46°54′34″N 92°21′51″W
- Country: United States
- State: Minnesota
- County: Saint Louis

Area
  - Total: 71.5 sq mi (185.1 km^{2})
  - Land: 65.9 sq mi (170.7 km^{2})
  - Water: 5.6 sq mi (14.4 km^{2})
- Elevation: 1,381 ft (421 m)

Population (2020)
  - Total: 2,720
  - Density: 41.3/sq mi (15.9/km^{2})
- Time zone: UTC-6 (Central (CST))
  - Summer (DST): UTC-5 (CDT)
- ZIP codes: 55779
- Area code: 218
- FIPS code: 27-24956
- GNIS feature ID: 0664312
- Website: https://grandlaketownship.gov/

Grand Lake Township is a township in Saint Louis County, Minnesota, United States. The population was 2,720 at the 2020 census.

The unincorporated community of Twig is in Grand Lake Township.

U.S. Highway 53 serves as a main route. Other routes include Industrial Road, Old Miller Trunk Highway, Munger Shaw Road, Bergstrom Road, Caribou Lake Road, and Canosia Road.

Grand Lake Township is in the unincorporated area of Saginaw.

== Geography ==
According to the United States Census Bureau, the township has a total area of 71.4 square miles (185 km^{2}); 65.9 square miles (171 km^{2}) is land and 5.5 square miles (14 km^{2}), or 7.75%, is water.

The Cloquet River flows through the northern portion of Grand Lake Township. The Ush-kab-wan River flows through the northeast part of the township near Taft. The Beaver River briefly enters the east–central part of the township. The White Pine River briefly enters the south–central part of the township.

Sullivan Creek flows through the central portion of the township. Spring Creek and Chicken Creek flow through the northwest part of the township. Grand Lake, from which the township took its name, is located within the southwest part of the township.

Pike Lake and Caribou Lake are both partially located within Grand Lake Township.

=== Adjacent townships and communities ===
The following are adjacent to Grand Lake Township :

- Canosia Township (east)
- Fredenberg Township (east)
- Solway Township (south)
- Industrial Township (west)
- New Independence Township (northwest)
- Whiteface Reservoir Unorganized Territory (north and northeast)
- The unincorporated community of Four Corners – Pike Lake business district (east-southeast)

=== Unincorporated communities ===
- Bartlett
- Harnell Park
- Taft
- Twig
- Twig Station

The northern portion of Grand Lake Township is in the Cloquet Valley State Forest.

Seville Road runs east–west along Grand Lake Township's southern boundary line with adjacent Solway Township.

Solway Road runs north–south along Grand Lake Township's eastern boundary line with adjacent Canosia Township.

Crosby Road briefly runs north–south along Grand Lake Township's western boundary line with adjacent Industrial Township, near Little Grand Lake and Grand Lake.

County Road 8 briefly enters the west–central part of Grand Lake Township, near its intersection with U.S. Highway 53.

== Demographics ==
As of the census of 2000, there were 2,621 people, 919 households, and 719 families residing in the township. The population density was 39.8 inhabitants per square mile (15.4/km^{2}). There were 1,081 housing units at an average density of 16.4 per square mile (6.3/km^{2}). The racial makeup of the township was 95.61% White, 0.61% African American, 2.02% Native American, 0.19% Asian, 0.04% Pacific Islander, 0.42% from other races, and 1.11% from two or more races. Hispanic or Latino of any race were 0.84% of the population.

There were 919 households, out of which 33.5% had children under the age of 18 living with them, 70.1% were married couples living together, 4.1% had a female householder with no husband present, and 21.7% were non-families. 17.1% of all households were made up of individuals, and 3.9% had someone living alone who was 65 years of age or older. The average household size was 2.66 and the average family size was 2.97.

In the township the population was spread out, with 23.5% under the age of 18, 7.6% from 18 to 24, 30.1% from 25 to 44, 29.5% from 45 to 64, and 9.3% who were 65 years of age or older. The median age was 40 years. For every 100 females, there were 111.7 males. For every 100 females age 18 and over, there were 117.1 males.

The median income for a household in the township was $53,900, and the median income for a family was $58,992. Males had a median income of $40,758 versus $28,421 for females. The per capita income for the township was $22,334. About 2.5% of families and 4.6% of the population were below the poverty line, including 3.5% of those under age 18 and 4.2% of those age 65 or over.
