= New Independence Township, St. Louis County, Minnesota =

New Independence Township, Minnesota
- Township
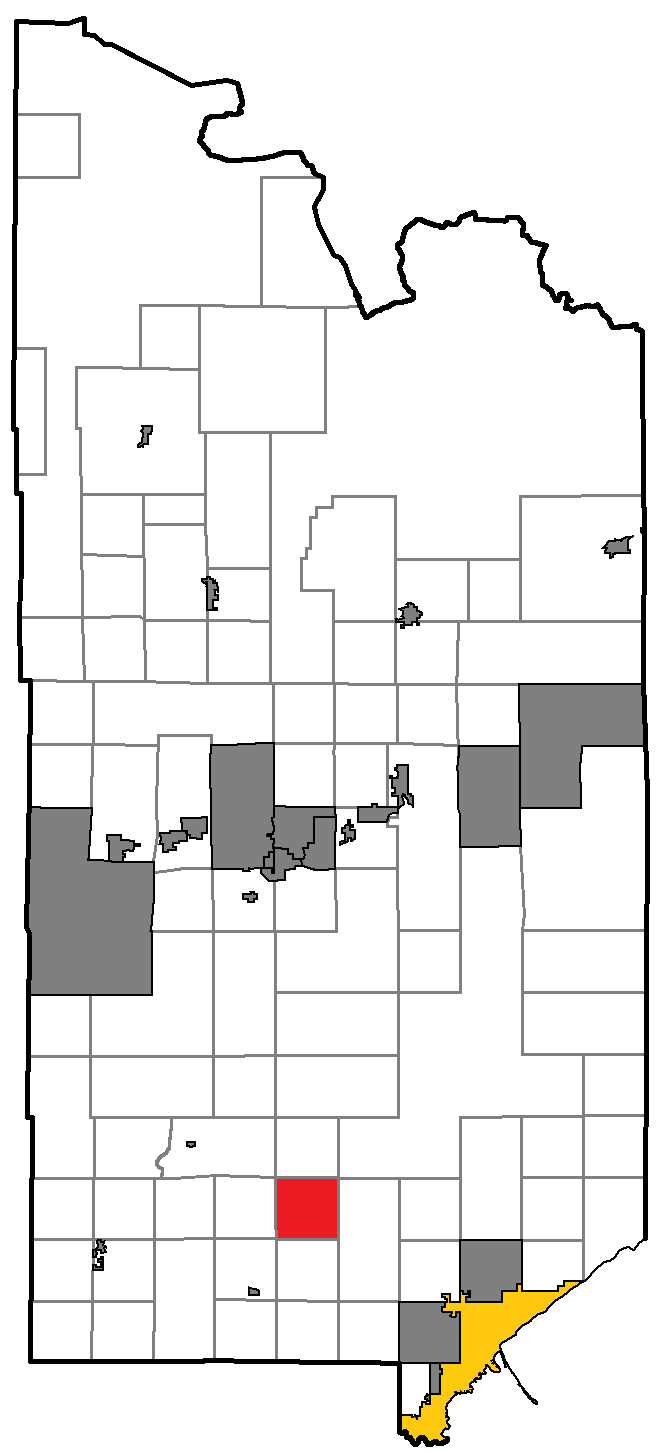
- Location of New Independence Township within St. Louis County, Minnesota
- Coordinates: 46°58′58″N 92°28′20″W
- Country: United States
- State: Minnesota
- County: Saint Louis

Area
  - Total: 35.8 sq mi (92.6 km^{2})
  - Land: 34.8 sq mi (90.2 km^{2})
  - Water: 0.89 sq mi (2.3 km^{2})
- Elevation: 1,339 ft (408 m)

Population (2020)
  - Total: 347
  - Density: 9.96/sq mi (3.85/km^{2})
- Time zone: UTC-6 (Central (CST))
  - Summer (DST): UTC-5 (CDT)
- Area code: 218
- FIPS code: 27-45664
- GNIS feature ID: 0665099
- Website: https://newindtwp.com/

New Independence Township is a township in Saint Louis County, Minnesota, United States. The population was 347 at the 2020 census.

U.S. Highway 53 and State Highway 33 (MN 33) are two of the main routes in the township.

Other routes include Saint Louis County Highway 47 (Swan Lake Road).

The unincorporated communities of Culver and Independence are located within New Independence Township.

Independence is located 22 miles northwest of the city of Duluth; and 17 miles north of the city of Cloquet.

South Ridge School is located within the southwest corner of the township.

== History ==
New Independence Township was named in commemoration of the independence of Norway from Sweden in 1905.

== Geography ==
According to the United States Census Bureau, the township has a total area of 35.7 square miles (92 km^{2}); 34.8 square miles (90 km^{2}) is land and 0.9 square miles (2.3 km^{2}), or 2.55%, is water.

The Cloquet River flows through the southeast corner of the township, and the Artichoke River flows through the northwest corner of the township.

=== Adjacent townships ===
The following are adjacent to New Independence Township :

- Industrial Township (south)
- Culver Township (southwest)
- Alborn Township (west)
- Meadowlands Township (northwest)
- Northland Township (north)
- Grand Lake Township (southeast)

The Cloquet Valley State Forest is to the immediate east of New Independence Township.

Birch Road (Saint Louis County Road 725) runs east–west along New Independence Township's northern boundary line with adjacent Northland Township.

Stoney Brook Road runs north–south along New Independence Township's western boundary line with adjacent Alborn Township; except for the southwest corner of New Independence Township where Saint Louis County Highway 7 serves as the boundary line with adjacent Alborn Township.

=== Unincorporated communities ===
- Culver
- Independence

== Demographics ==
As of the census of 2000, there were 272 people, 106 households, and 80 families residing in the township. The population density was 7.8 people per square mile (3.0/km^{2}). There were 136 housing units at an average density of 3.9/sq mi (1.5/km^{2}). The racial makeup of the township was 97.43% White, 0.74% Native American, 0.37% Asian, and 1.47% from two or more races. Hispanic or Latino of any race were 2.94% of the population.

There were 106 households, out of which 37.7% had children under the age of 18 living with them, 67.0% were married couples living together, 3.8% had a female householder with no husband present, and 24.5% were non-families. 23.6% of all households were made up of individuals, and 5.7% had someone living alone who was 65 years of age or older. The average household size was 2.57 and the average family size was 3.01.

In the township the population was spread out, with 26.1% under the age of 18, 5.9% from 18 to 24, 33.1% from 25 to 44, 25.4% from 45 to 64, and 9.6% who were 65 years of age or older. The median age was 39 years. For every 100 females, there were 119.4 males. For every 100 females age 18 and over, there were 111.6 males.

The median income for a household in the township was $50,625, and the median income for a family was $56,875. Males had a median income of $42,500 versus $21,750 for females. The per capita income for the township was $20,738. About 2.4% of families and 1.8% of the population were below the poverty line, including none of those under the age of eighteen and 13.5% of those 65 or over.
