= Prosit, Minnesota =

Prosit
- Unincorporated community
- Location within Minnesota Location within the United States
- Coordinates: 46°59′53″N 92°37′04″W
- Country: United States
- State: Minnesota
- County: Saint Louis
- Township: Alborn Township
- Elevation: 1,329 ft (405 m)

Population
  - Total: 10
- Time zone: UTC-6 (Central (CST))
  - Summer (DST): UTC-5 (CDT)
- ZIP code: 55702
- Area code: 218
- GNIS feature ID: 662234

Prosit is an unincorporated community in Alborn Township, Saint Louis County, Minnesota, United States.

The community is located nine miles southeast of Meadowlands at the junction of Saint Louis County Highway 47 and West Shipley Road. Prosit is also located nine miles west of Independence. The community of Alborn is nearby.

Aerie Lake, Crooked Lake, Eier Lake, Maple Leaf Lake, and Round Lake are all in the vicinity.
