= Twig, Minnesota =

Twig
- Unincorporated community
- Location within Minnesota Location within the United States
- Coordinates: 46°53′40″N 92°21′53″W
- Country: United States
- State: Minnesota
- County: Saint Louis
- Township: Grand Lake Township
- Elevation: 1,362 ft (415 m)

Population
  - Total: 60
- Time zone: UTC-6 (Central (CST))
  - Summer (DST): UTC-5 (CDT)
- ZIP codes: 55791 and 55779
- Area code: 218
- GNIS feature ID: 662682

Twig is an unincorporated community in Grand Lake Township, St. Louis County, Minnesota, United States.

The community is located 15 miles northwest of the city of Duluth at the junction of U.S. Highway 53 and Saint Louis County Road 7 (Industrial Road).

Twig is located within the Saginaw, MN area ZIP code 55779.

Twig is mentioned in a newspaper in the 2016 film Fantastic Beasts and Where to Find Them.

== Notable people ==
- Garry Bjorklund, long-distance runner
- Dylan Samberg, NHL Player
