= Brevator Township, St. Louis County, Minnesota =

Brevator Township, Minnesota
- Township
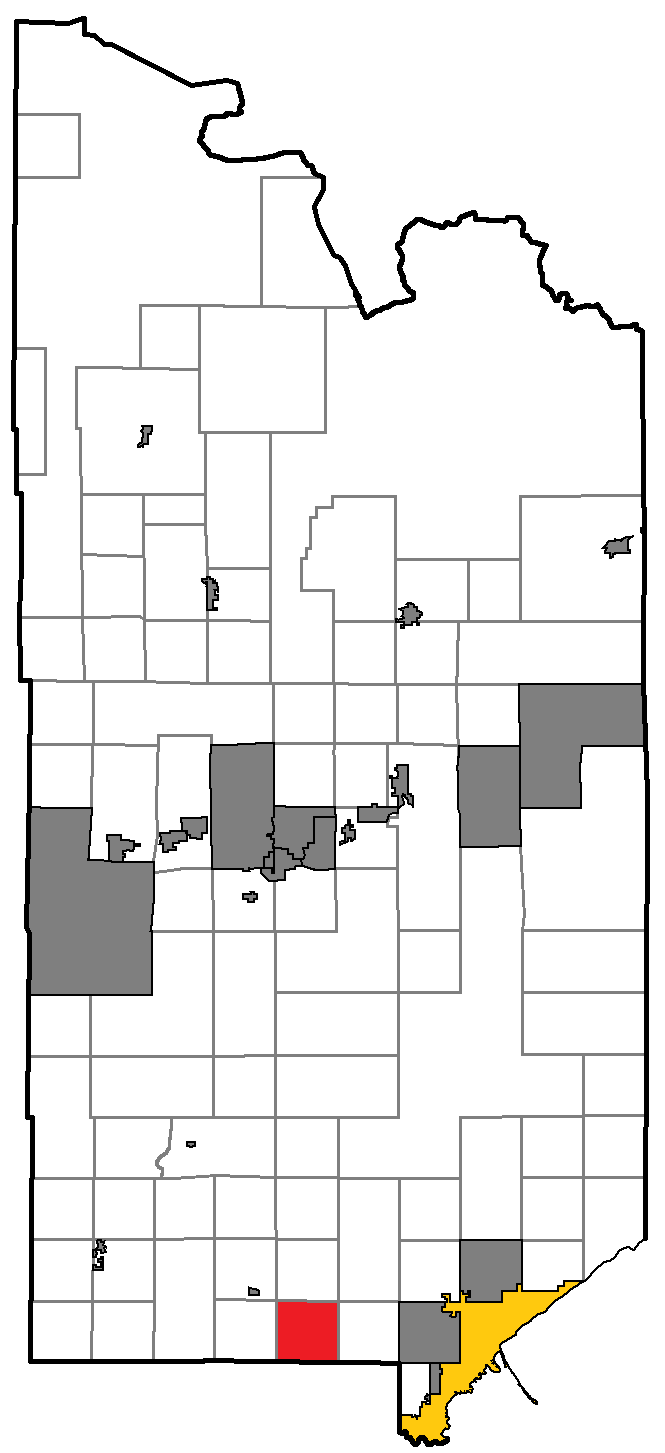
- Location of Brevator Township within St. Louis County, Minnesota
- Coordinates: 46°47′50″N 92°28′52″W
- Country: United States
- State: Minnesota
- County: Saint Louis

Area
  - Total: 35.7 sq mi (92.4 km^{2})
  - Land: 34.6 sq mi (89.5 km^{2})
  - Water: 1.1 sq mi (2.9 km^{2})
- Elevation: 1,224 ft (373 m)

Population (2020)
  - Total: 1,214
  - Density: 35.1/sq mi (13.6/km^{2})
- Time zone: UTC-6 (Central (CST))
  - Summer (DST): UTC-5 (CDT)
- Area code: 218
- FIPS code: 27-07606
- GNIS feature ID: 0663662
- Website: https://brevatortownshipmn.org/

Brevator Township is a township in Saint Louis County, Minnesota, United States. The population was 1,214 at the 2020 census.

U.S. Highway 2 and State Highway 33 (MN 33) are two of the main routes in the township.

Highway 2 runs east–west through the northern portion of the township. Highway 33 runs north–south through the eastern portion of the township.

A portion of Brevator Township is located within the Fond du Lac Indian Reservation.

== Geography ==
According to the United States Census Bureau, the township has a total area of 35.7 square miles (92 km^{2}); 34.6 square miles (90 km^{2}) is land and 1.1 square miles (2.8 km^{2}), or 3.14%, is water.

The Saint Louis River and the White Pine River both flow through Brevator Township.

=== Adjacent townships, cities, and communities ===
The following municipalities and communities are adjacent to Brevator Township :

- Industrial Township (north)
- Grand Lake Township (northeast)
- Culver Township (northwest)
- Stoney Brook Township (west)
- Solway Township (east)
- Thomson Township of Carlton County (southeast)
- The city of Cloquet (south)

Saint Louis River Road runs east–west along Brevator Township's southern boundary line with adjacent city of Cloquet and Carlton County.

Crosby Road runs north–south along Brevator Township's eastern boundary line with adjacent Solway Township.

Seville Road runs east–west along Brevator Township's northern boundary line with adjacent Industrial Township.

Brookston Road runs north–south along Brevator Township's western boundary line with adjacent Stoney Brook Township.

=== Census-designated place (CDP) ===
- Mahnomen – Unincorporated community

== Demographics ==
As of the census of 2000, there were 1,226 people, 403 households, and 326 families residing in the township. The population density was 35.5 inhabitants per square mile (13.7/km^{2}). There were 416 housing units at an average density of 12.0 per square mile (4.6/km^{2}). The racial makeup of the township was 79.04% White, 0.08% African American, 18.84% Native American, 0.41% Asian, 0.08% Pacific Islander, 0.08% from other races, and 1.47% from two or more races. Hispanic or Latino of any race were 0.57% of the population.

There were 403 households, out of which 45.4% had children under the age of 18 living with them, 64.8% were married couples living together, 10.4% had a female householder with no husband present, and 18.9% were non-families. 12.9% of all households were made up of individuals, and 4.0% had someone living alone who was 65 years of age or older. The average household size was 3.04 and the average family size was 3.29.

In the township the population was spread out, with 32.9% under the age of 18, 7.5% from 18 to 24, 30.8% from 25 to 44, 22.4% from 45 to 64, and 6.4% who were 65 years of age or older. The median age was 34 years. For every 100 females, there were 105.7 males. For every 100 females age 18 and over, there were 99.8 males.

The median income for a household in the township was $46,944, and the median income for a family was $50,625. Males had a median income of $38,158 versus $22,656 for females. The per capita income for the township was $16,686. About 6.4% of families and 8.2% of the population were below the poverty line, including 11.1% of those under age 18 and none of those age 65 or over.
