= Culver Township, St. Louis County, Minnesota =

Township in Minnesota, United States

Culver Township, Minnesota
- Township
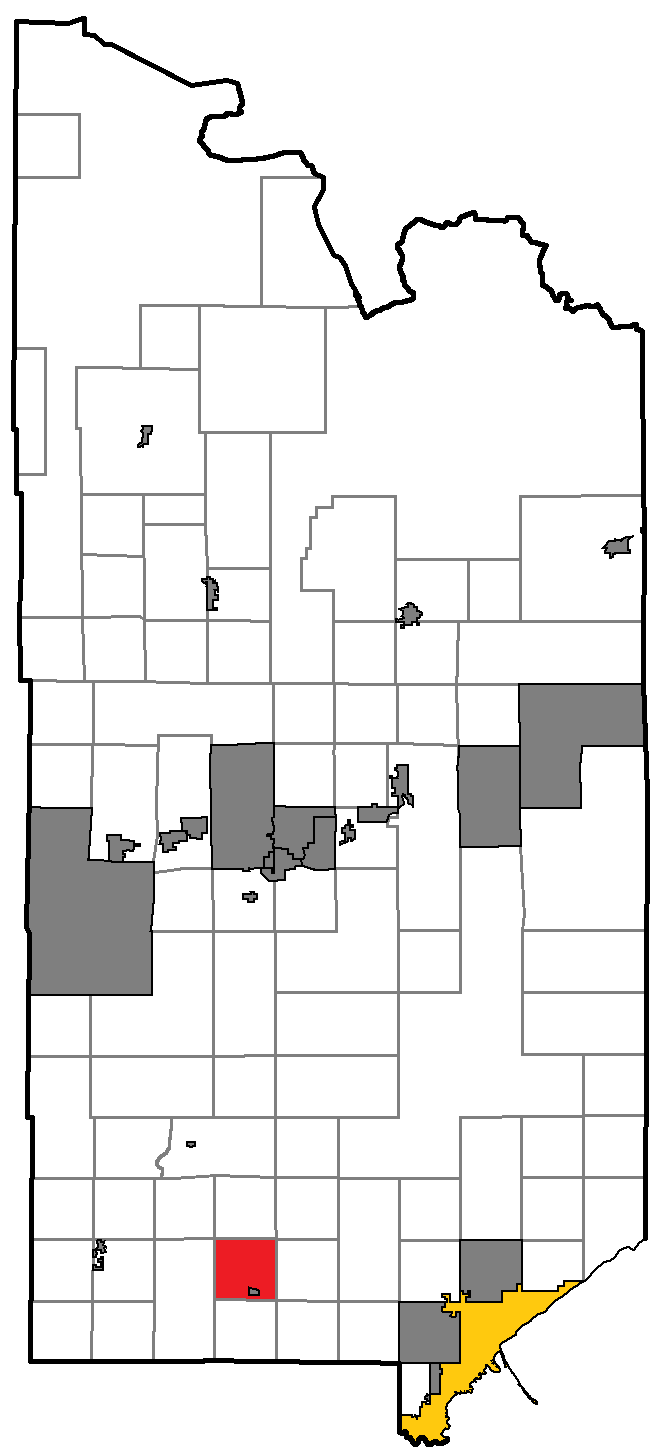
- Location of Culver Township within St. Louis County, Minnesota
- Coordinates: 46°53′42″N 92°35′40″W
- Country: United States
- State: Minnesota
- County: Saint Louis

Area
  - Total: 35.1 sq mi (90.9 km^{2})
  - Land: 34.6 sq mi (89.6 km^{2})
  - Water: 0.50 sq mi (1.3 km^{2})
- Elevation: 1,299 ft (396 m)

Population (2020)
  - Total: 303
  - Density: 8.76/sq mi (3.38/km^{2})
- Time zone: UTC-6 (Central (CST))
  - Summer (DST): UTC-5 (CDT)
- Area code: 218
- FIPS code: 27-14284
- GNIS feature ID: 0663906

Culver Township is a township in Saint Louis County, Minnesota, United States. The population was 303 at the 2020 census.

U.S. Highway 2 serves as a main route for the township. Highway 2 runs east–west along Culver Township's southern boundary line with adjacent Stoney Brook Township.

The unincorporated community of Culver, within Culver Township, is located 27 miles northwest of the city of Duluth at the junction of Saint Louis County Highway 7 (CR 7) and County Road 8 (CR 8).

The city of Brookston is within Culver Township geographically but is a separate entity.

Part of Culver Township is within the Fond du Lac Indian Reservation.

== History ==
Culver Township was named for Joshua B. Culver, first mayor of Duluth, Minnesota.

== Geography ==
According to the United States Census Bureau, the township has a total area of 35.1 square miles (91 km^{2}); 34.6 square miles (90 km^{2}) is land and 0.5 square miles (1.3 km^{2}), or 1.45%, is water.

The Saint Louis River, the Cloquet River, and the Artichoke River all flow through Culver Township.

=== Adjacent townships ===
The following are adjacent to Culver Township :

- Industrial Township (east)
- Arrowhead Township (west)
- Stoney Brook Township (south)
- Brevator Township (southeast)
- Alborn Township (north)
- New Independence Township (northeast)
- Ness Township (northwest)

=== Unincorporated communities ===
- Culver

== Demographics ==
At the 2000 census there were 285 people in 99 households, including 72 families, in the township. The population density was 8.2 people per square mile (3.2/km^{2}). There were 118 housing units at an average density of 3.4/sq mi (1.3/km^{2}). The racial makeup of the township was 92.28% White, 5.96% Native American, and 1.75% from two or more races. Hispanic or Latino of any race were 0.35%.

Of the 99 households 36.4% had children under the age of 18 living with them, 61.6% were married couples living together, 8.1% had a female householder with no husband present, and 26.3% were non-families. 20.2% of households were one person and 10.1% were one person aged 65 or older. The average household size was 2.70 and the average family size was 3.05.

The age distribution was 29.5% under the age of 18, 6.0% from 18 to 24, 27.7% from 25 to 44, 21.4% from 45 to 64, and 15.4% 65 or older. The median age was 35 years. For every 100 females, there were 115.9 males. For every 100 females age 18 and over, there were 101.0 males.

The median household income was $38,333 and the median family income was $41,875. Males had a median income of $35,833 versus $16,705 for females. The per capita income for the township was $15,028. About 9.0% of families and 12.7% of the population were below the poverty line, including 13.4% of those under the age of eighteen and 18.4% of those sixty five or over.
