= Culver, Minnesota =

Culver
- Unincorporated community
- Location within Minnesota Location within the United States
- Coordinates: 46°55′33″N 92°33′31″W
- Country: United States
- State: Minnesota
- County: Saint Louis
- Elevation: 1,289 ft (393 m)

Population
  - Total: 30
- Time zone: UTC-6 (Central (CST))
  - Summer (DST): UTC-5 (CDT)
- ZIP code: 55779
- Area code: 218
- GNIS feature ID: 661078

Culver is an unincorporated community in Saint Louis County, Minnesota, United States.

The community is 27 miles northwest of the city of Duluth.

The center of Culver is generally considered at the junction of Saint Louis County Highway 7 (CR 7) and County Road 8 (CR 8), which is also the boundary line between Culver Township and Industrial Township. The unincorporated community of Culver also extends into the southern portion of New Independence Township.

The Artichoke River flows through the community.

South Ridge School is located in Culver.

A post office called Culver was established in 1894, and remained in operation until 1989. The community was named for Joshua B. Culver, first mayor of Duluth, Minnesota.
