= Payne, Minnesota =

Payne
- Unincorporated community
- Location within Minnesota Location within the United States
- Coordinates: 47°05′46″N 92°35′58″W
- Country: United States
- State: Minnesota
- County: Saint Louis
- Township: Meadowlands Township
- Elevation: 1,312 ft (400 m)

Population
  - Total: 10
- Time zone: UTC-6 (Central (CST))
  - Summer (DST): UTC-5 (CDT)
- ZIP code: 55765
- Area code: 218
- GNIS feature ID: 662146

Payne is an unincorporated community in Meadowlands Township, Saint Louis County, Minnesota, United States.

== Geography ==
Payne is located in the northeast corner of Meadowlands Township. The community is located at the intersection of Saint Louis County Highway 7 (CR 7) and County Road 232 (Lake Nichols Road). Saint Louis County Highway 133 (CR 133) is nearby.

== History ==
A post office called Payne was established in 1904, and remained in operation until 1972. The community was named for a railroad official.
