= Industrial Township, St. Louis County, Minnesota =

Industrial Township, Minnesota
- Township
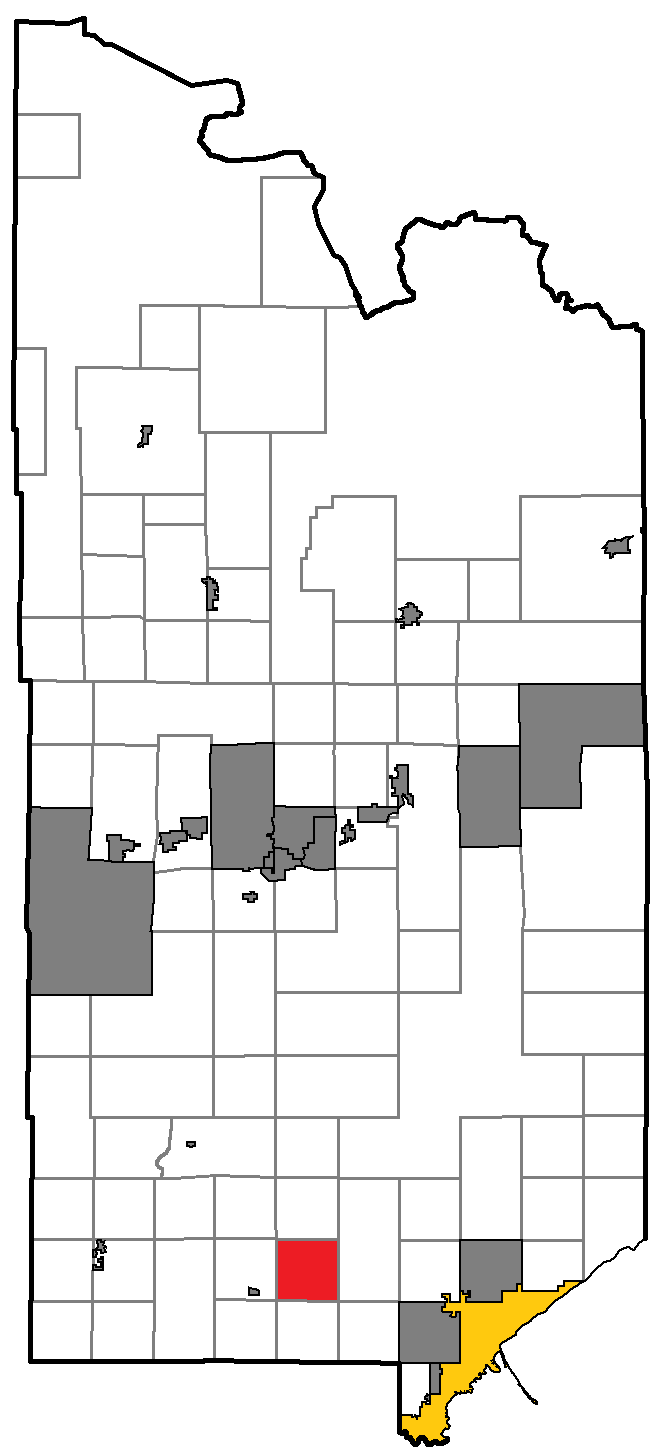
- Location of Industrial Township within St. Louis County, Minnesota
- Coordinates: 46°53′39″N 92°29′17″W
- Country: United States
- State: Minnesota
- County: Saint Louis

Area
  - Total: 36.1 sq mi (93.4 km^{2})
  - Land: 35.6 sq mi (92.3 km^{2})
  - Water: 0.42 sq mi (1.1 km^{2})
- Elevation: 1,309 ft (399 m)

Population (2020)
  - Total: 812
  - Density: 22.8/sq mi (8.80/km^{2})
- Time zone: UTC-6 (Central (CST))
  - Summer (DST): UTC-5 (CDT)
- ZIP codes: 55779
- Area code: 218
- FIPS code: 27-30932
- GNIS feature ID: 0664545
- Website: https://www.industrialtownshipmn.org/

Industrial Township is a township in Saint Louis County, Minnesota, United States. The population was 812 at the 2020 census.

State Highway 33 (MN 33) serves as a main route in the township. Other routes include Industrial Road (County 7), Saginaw Road, Independence Road, and Albert Road.

Highway 33 runs north–south through the township. Industrial Road (County 7) runs east–west through the middle of the township.

County Road 8 runs east–west through the northern portion of the township.

The unincorporated community of Burnett is located within Industrial Township.

Industrial Township is located within the unincorporated area of Saginaw.

== Geography ==
According to the United States Census Bureau, the township has a total area of 36.1 square miles (93 km^{2}); 35.6 square miles (92 km^{2}) is land and 0.4 square miles (1.0 km^{2}), or 1.22%, is water.

The Cloquet River flows through Industrial Township.

=== Adjacent townships ===
The following are adjacent to Industrial Township :

- Grand Lake Township (east)
- Solway Township (southeast)
- Brevator Township (south)
- Stoney Brook Township (southwest)
- Culver Township (west)
- Alborn Township (northwest)
- New Independence Township (north)

Seville Road runs east–west along Industrial Township's southern boundary line with adjacent Brevator Township.

Crosby Road briefly runs north–south along Industrial Township's eastern boundary line with adjacent Grand Lake Township.

=== Unincorporated communities ===
- Burnett

== Demographics ==
As of the census of 2000, there were 628 people, 238 households, and 178 families residing in the township. The population density was 17.6 inhabitants per square mile (6.8/km^{2}). There were 274 housing units at an average density of 7.7 per square mile (3.0/km^{2}). The racial makeup of the township was 93.95% White, 0.16% African American, 2.39% Native American, 0.64% Asian, 0.96% from other races, and 1.91% from two or more races. Hispanic or Latino of any race were 1.75% of the population.

There were 238 households, out of which 35.3% had children under the age of 18 living with them, 59.7% were married couples living together, 8.8% had a female householder with no husband present, and 25.2% were non-families. 19.3% of all households were made up of individuals, and 6.3% had someone living alone who was 65 years of age or older. The average household size was 2.64 and the average family size was 2.98.

In the township the population was spread out, with 26.9% under the age of 18, 7.2% from 18 to 24, 30.9% from 25 to 44, 25.6% from 45 to 64, and 9.4% who were 65 years of age or older. The median age was 38 years. For every 100 females, there were 113.6 males. For every 100 females age 18 and over, there were 111.5 males.

The median income for a household in the township was $43,750, and the median income for a family was $50,909. Males had a median income of $40,000 versus $27,500 for females. The per capita income for the township was $19,355. About 2.2% of families and 5.8% of the population were below the poverty line, including 3.9% of those under age 18 and none of those age 65 or over.
