= Meadowlands Township, St. Louis County, Minnesota =

Meadowlands Township, Minnesota
- Township
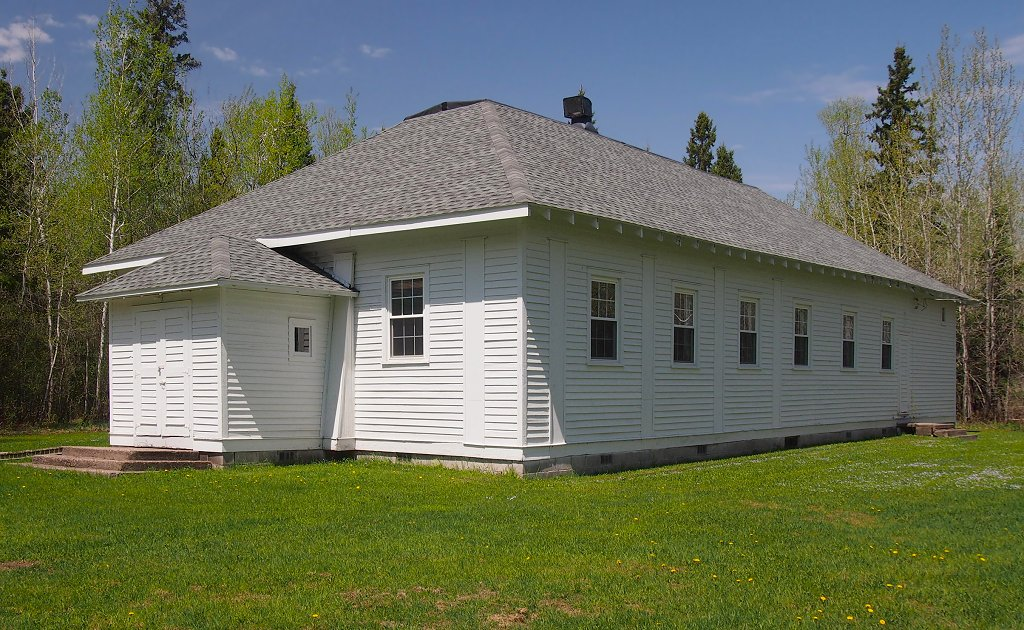
- The Western Bohemian Fraternal Union Hall in Meadowlands Township

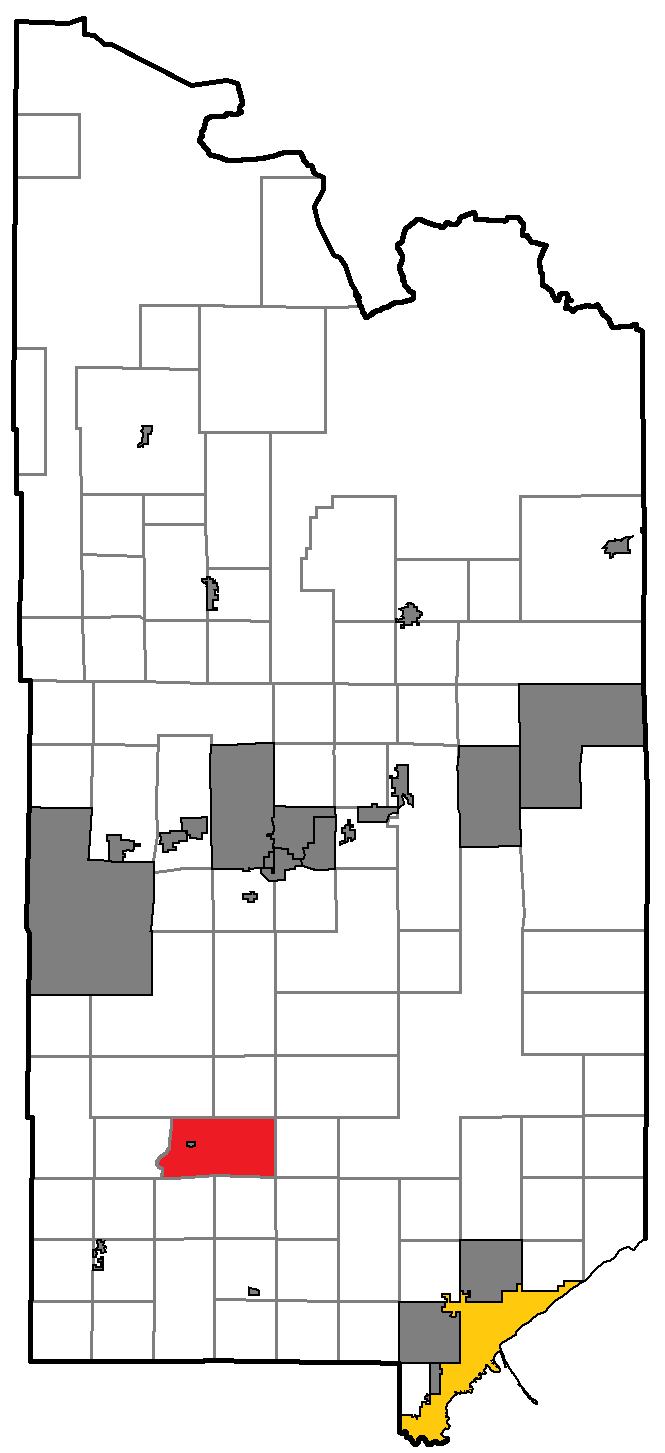
- Location of Meadowlands Township within St. Louis County, Minnesota
- Coordinates: 47°4′22″N 92°41′30″W
- Country: United States
- State: Minnesota
- County: Saint Louis

Area
  - Total: 60.5 sq mi (156.6 km^{2})
  - Land: 59.8 sq mi (155.0 km^{2})
  - Water: 0.58 sq mi (1.5 km^{2})
- Elevation: 1,270 ft (387 m)

Population (2020)
  - Total: 306
  - Density: 5.11/sq mi (1.97/km^{2})
- Time zone: UTC-6 (Central (CST))
  - Summer (DST): UTC-5 (CDT)
- FIPS code: 27-41390
- GNIS feature ID: 0664944

Meadowlands Township is a township in Saint Louis County, Minnesota, United States. The population was 306 at the 2020 census.

Saint Louis County Highway 7 (CR 7) runs north–south through the eastern portion of the township. County Highway 133 (CR 133) runs east–west through the middle of Meadowlands Township.

County 5 (CR 5) and County 29 (CR 29) both pass through the western portion of the township running north–south.

The city of Meadowlands is located within the township geographically but is a separate entity.

The unincorporated community of Payne is located within the northeast corner of Meadowlands Township.

== Geography ==
According to the United States Census Bureau, the township has a total area of 60.5 square miles (157 km^{2}); 59.9 square miles (155 km^{2}) is land and 0.6 square miles (1.6 km^{2}), or 0.98%, is water.

The Whiteface River flows through the western portion of the township.

The Whiteface River State Forest is located within Meadowlands Township.

The Saint Louis River runs north–south along Meadowlands Township's western boundary line with adjacent Elmer Township.

=== Adjacent townships ===
The following are adjacent to Meadowlands Township :

- Northland Township (east)
- Elmer Township (west)
- New Independence Township (southeast)
- Alborn Township (south)
- Ness Township (southwest)
- Toivola Township (northwest)
- Kelsey Township (north)
- Cotton Township (northeast)

=== Unincorporated communities ===
- Payne

== Demographics ==
As of the census of 2000, there were 315 people, 128 households, and 92 families residing in the township. The population density was 5.3 inhabitants per square mile (2.0/km^{2}). There were 165 housing units at an average density of 2.8 per square mile (1.1/km^{2}). The racial makeup of the township was 96.19% White, 1.90% Native American, and 1.90% from two or more races.

There were 128 households, out of which 30.5% had children under the age of 18 living with them, 54.7% were married couples living together, 7.8% had a female householder with no husband present, and 28.1% were non-families. 23.4% of all households were made up of individuals, and 8.6% had someone living alone who was 65 years of age or older. The average household size was 2.46 and the average family size was 2.90.

In the township the population was spread out, with 25.1% under the age of 18, 6.7% from 18 to 24, 29.5% from 25 to 44, 24.4% from 45 to 64, and 14.3% who were 65 years of age or older. The median age was 39 years. For every 100 females, there were 138.6 males. For every 100 females age 18 and over, there were 136.0 males.

The median income for a household in the township was $31,250, and the median income for a family was $35,250. Males had a median income of $34,286 versus $30,000 for females. The per capita income for the township was $16,321. About 9.3% of families and 12.4% of the population were below the poverty line, including 18.4% of those under age 18 and 9.3% of those age 65 or over.
