= Western Bohemian Fraternal Union Hall =

- U.S. National Register of Historic Places
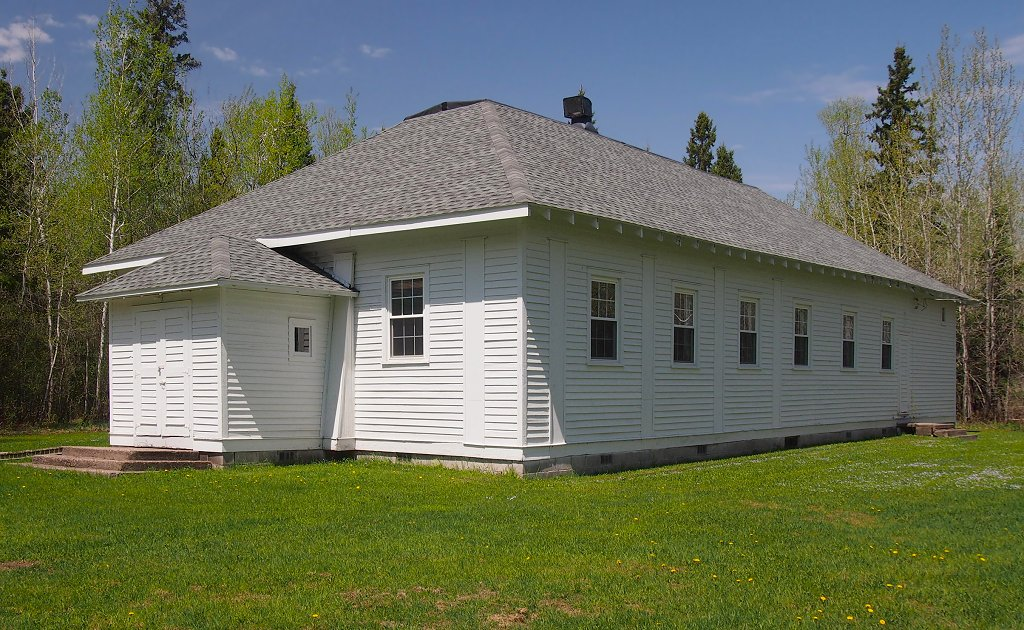
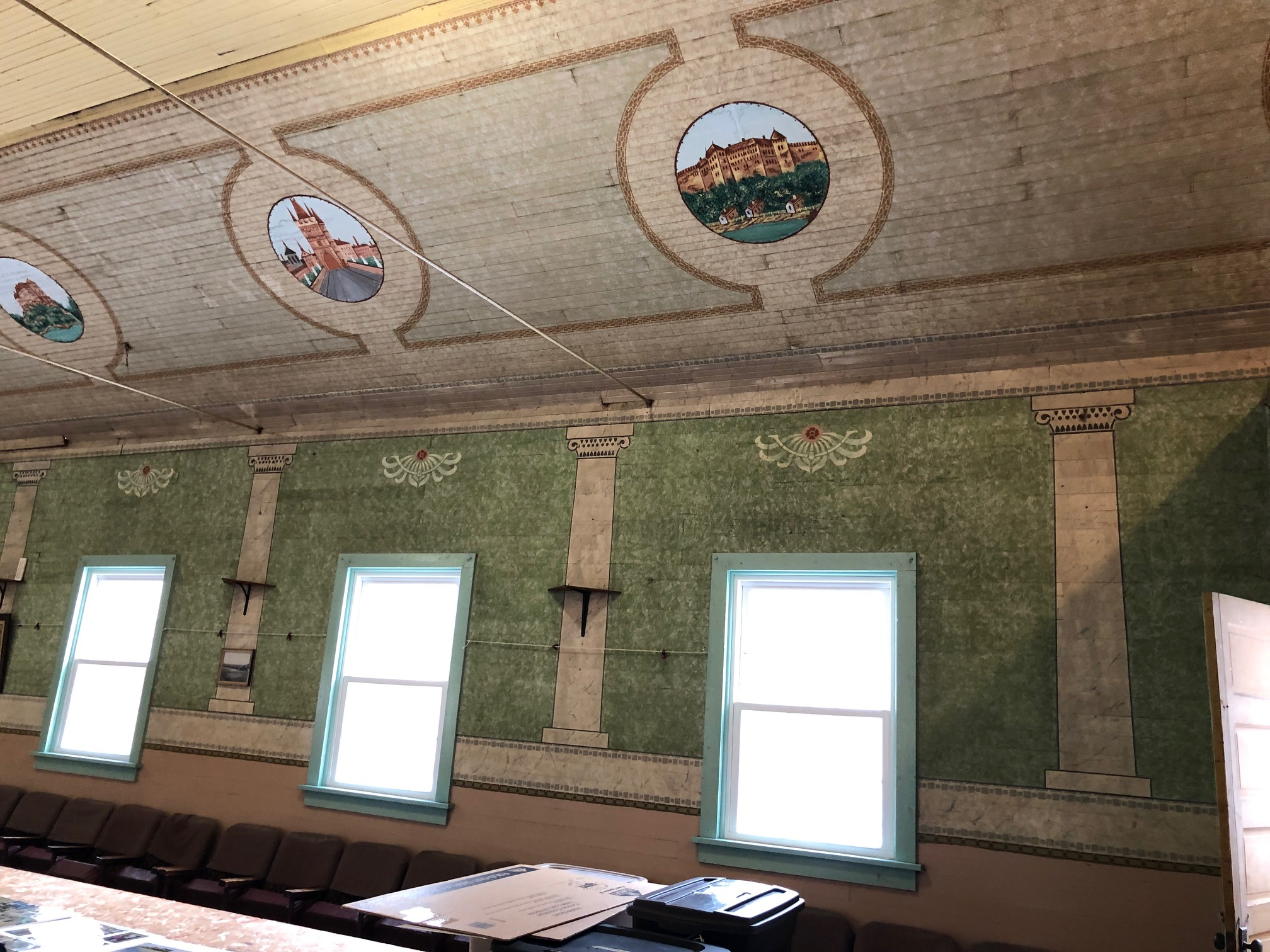
- Exterior and interior of the Western Bohemian Fraternal Union Hall

- Location within Minnesota Location within the United States
- Location: County Road 29, Meadowlands Township, Minnesota
- Coordinates: 47°2′53″N 92°44′46″W
- Area: 2.5 acres (1.0 ha)
- Built: 1925
- NRHP reference No.: 86002123
- Added to NRHP: July 31, 1986

The Western Bohemian Fraternal Union Hall is a historic clubhouse in Meadowlands Township, Minnesota, United States. It was built in 1925 as a meeting hall for a lodge of the Western Bohemian Fraternal Union (Zapadni Ceska Bratrska Jednota), a society of Czech Americans. The hall also served as a host for Sokol gymnastics events. The hall was listed on the National Register of Historic Places in 1986 for its local significance in the themes of European ethnic heritage and social history. It was nominated for being a long-serving rural venue for the preservation of Czech American culture and heritage.

== See also ==
- National Register of Historic Places listings in St. Louis County, Minnesota
