= Us-kab-wan-ka River =

Us-kab-wan-ka River Ush-kab-wan River
- Mouth of the Us-kab-wan-ka River
- Native name: askhibwaakaani-ziibi (Ojibwe)

Location
- Country: United States
- State: Minnesota

Physical characteristics
- Source
  - location: Rush Lake
  - coordinates: 47.1477108°N 92.1887955°W
- Mouth
  - location: Twig, Taft
  - coordinates: 46°58′19″N 92°20′28″W
- Length: 19.7 mi-long (31.7 km)
- Basin size: 40.43 square miles (104.7 km^{2})

Basin features
- River system: Cloquet River

Us-kab-wan-ka River, also known as the Ush-kab-wan River, is a small tributary of the Cloquet River in northeast Minnesota in the United States. It is approximately 19.7 miles (31.7 km) long. Along with its tributaries, the Us-kab-wan-ka drains an area of 40.43 square miles (104.7 km^{2}).

Its name in the Ojibwe language is ashkibwaakaani-ziibi (river full of Jerusalem artichokes), having the identical name in Ojibwe as the nearby Artichoke River.

== Course ==
Via the Cloquet River and the Saint Louis River, it is part of the watershed of Lake Superior. It flows through Whiteface Reservoir Unorganized Territory and Grand Lake Township in southern Saint Louis County.

The river begins at the outlet of Rush Lake in Cloquet Valley State Forest and flows generally southwest, then southward. It flows into the Cloquet River, two miles south of Taft.

== See also ==
- List of Minnesota rivers
