= Independence, St. Louis County, Minnesota =

Independence
- Unincorporated community
- Location within Minnesota Location within the United States
- Coordinates: 46°57′30″N 92°27′38″W
- Country: United States
- State: Minnesota
- County: Saint Louis
- Township: New Independence Township
- Elevation: 1,302 ft (397 m)

Population
  - Total: 10
- Time zone: UTC-6 (Central (CST))
  - Summer (DST): UTC-5 (CDT)
- ZIP code: 55779
- Area code: 218
- GNIS feature ID: 661532

Independence is an unincorporated community in New Independence Township, Saint Louis County, Minnesota, United States.

The community is located 22 miles (35 km) northwest of the city of Duluth at the junction of U.S. Highway 53 and State Highway 33 (MN 33). Saint Louis County Highway 47 (CR 47) is also in the vicinity. Independence is located 17 miles (27 km) north of the city of Cloquet.

The Cloquet River flows through the area. The community of Culver is nearby.
