= Alborn Township, St. Louis County, Minnesota =

Alborn Township, Minnesota
- Township
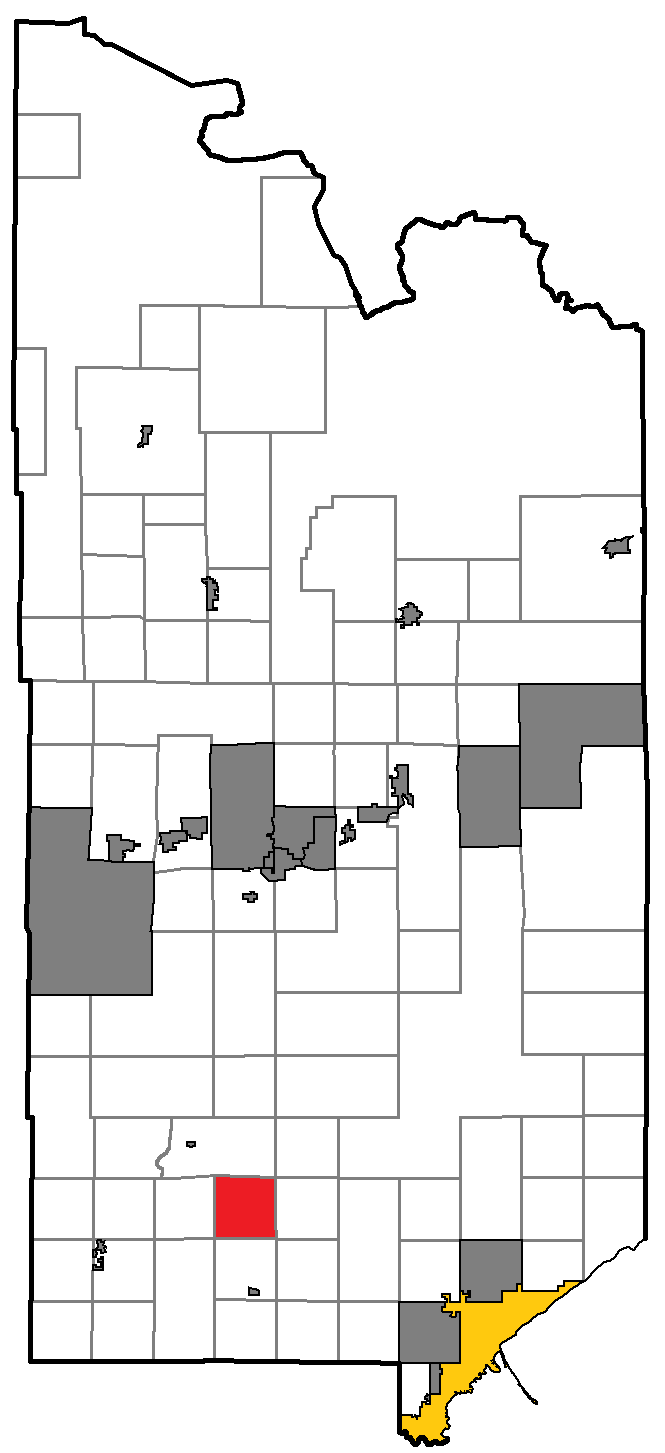
- Location of Alborn Township within St. Louis County, Minnesota
- Coordinates: 46°58′12″N 92°34′58″W
- Country: United States
- State: Minnesota
- County: Saint Louis

Area
  - Total: 35.3 sq mi (91.3 km^{2})
  - Land: 34.6 sq mi (89.5 km^{2})
  - Water: 0.69 sq mi (1.8 km^{2})
- Elevation: 1,350 ft (410 m)

Population (2020)
  - Total: 425
  - Density: 12.3/sq mi (4.75/km^{2})
- Time zone: UTC-6 (Central (CST))
  - Summer (DST): UTC-5 (CDT)
- Area code: 218
- FIPS code: 27-00820
- GNIS feature ID: 0663406
- Website: https://alborntownship.org/

Alborn Township (/ˈælbərn/ AL-bərn) is a township in Saint Louis County, Minnesota, United States. At the 2020 census, the population was 425.

The unincorporated communities of Alborn and Prosit are both located within Alborn Township.

The community of Alborn is located 29 miles northwest of the city of Duluth at the junction of Saint Louis County Highway 7 (CR 7) and County Highway 47 (CR 47).

== Geography ==
According to the United States Census Bureau, the township has a total area of 35.2 square miles (91 km^{2}); 34.5 square miles (89 km^{2}) is land and 0.7 square miles (1.8 km^{2}), or 1.96%, is water.

The Artichoke River flows through the township.

=== Adjacent townships ===
The following are adjacent to Alborn Township :

- New Independence Township (east)
- Ness Township (west)
- Industrial Township (southeast)
- Culver Township (south)
- Arrowhead Township (southwest)
- Meadowlands Township (north and northwest)
- Northland Township (northeast)

=== Unincorporated communities ===
- Alborn
- Prosit

== Demographics ==
At the 2000 census there were 399 people, 153 households, and 115 families living in the township. The population density was 11.6 people per square mile (4.5/km^{2}). There were 260 housing units at an average density of 7.5/sq mi (2.9/km^{2}). The racial makeup of the township was 90.23% White, 5.51% Native American, 0.25% Asian, 0.50% Pacific Islander, and 3.51% from two or more races. Hispanic or Latino of any race were 0.50%.

Of the 153 households 30.1% had children under the age of 18 living with them, 66.7% were married couples living together, 6.5% had a female householder with no husband present, and 24.2% were non-families. 20.3% of households were one person and 8.5% were one person aged 65 or older. The average household size was 2.61 and the average family size was 3.00.

The age distribution was 24.3% under the age of 18, 10.3% from 18 to 24, 25.6% from 25 to 44, 27.1% from 45 to 64, and 12.8% 65 or older. The median age was 41 years. For every 100 females, there were 108.9 males. For every 100 females age 18 and over, there were 101.3 males.

The median household income was $42,500 and the median family income was $51,458. Males had a median income of $31,827 versus $27,292 for females. The per capita income for the township was $18,953. About 1.8% of families and 5.3% of the population were below the poverty line, including 2.6% of those under age 18 and 6.7% of those age 65 or over.
