= Simar, Minnesota =

Simar
- Unincorporated community
- Location within Minnesota Location within the United States
- Coordinates: 46°48′47″N 92°20′38″W
- Country: United States
- State: Minnesota
- County: Saint Louis
- Township: Solway Township
- Elevation: 1,391 ft (424 m)
- Time zone: UTC-6 (Central (CST))
  - Summer (DST): UTC-5 (CDT)
- ZIP code: 55720 and 55810
- Area code: 218
- GNIS feature ID: 662453

Simar is an unincorporated community in Solway Township, Saint Louis County, Minnesota, United States, located near Munger.
