= Saginaw, Minnesota =

Saginaw
- Unincorporated area
- Location within Minnesota Location within the United States
- Coordinates: 46°51′33″N 92°26′40″W
- Country: United States
- State: Minnesota
- County: Saint Louis
- Elevation: 1,352 ft (412 m)
- Time zone: UTC-6 (Central (CST))
  - Summer (DST): UTC-5 (CDT)
- ZIP code: 55779
- Area code: 218
- GNIS feature ID: 662318

Saginaw is an unincorporated area in Saint Louis County, Minnesota, United States. Although unincorporated, Saginaw has a post office with the ZIP code 55779.

== Geography ==
Saginaw is located 18 miles northwest of the city of Duluth. The center of Saginaw is generally considered at the junction of Saginaw Road (Saint Louis County Road 46) and Vibert Road (County Road 875) in the southeast corner of Industrial Township. Nearby is the junction of U.S. Highway 2 and State Highway 33 in the northeast corner of Brevator Township. U.S. 53, U.S. 2, State Highway 33 (MN 33), and State Highway 194 (MN 194) are four of the main routes in the Saginaw area.

Grand Lake Township and Industrial Township are also known as Saginaw.

The unincorporated communities of Taft and Twig are located within the Saginaw area.

== History ==
A post office called Saginaw has been in operation since 1906. Saginaw was probably named after Saginaw, Michigan.
