= Solway Township, St. Louis County, Minnesota =

Solway Township, Minnesota
- Township
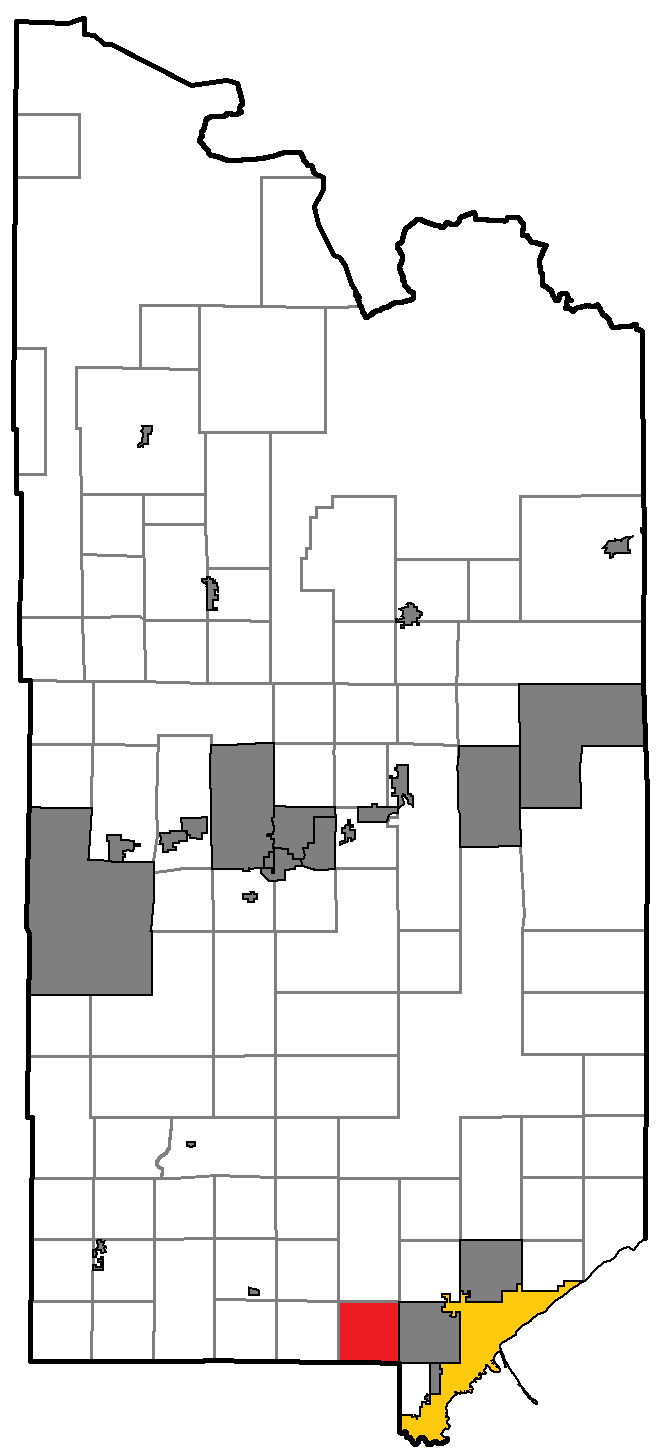
- Location of Solway Township within St. Louis County, Minnesota
- Coordinates: 46°48′55″N 92°21′35″W
- Country: United States
- State: Minnesota
- County: Saint Louis

Area
  - Total: 35.8 sq mi (92.6 km^{2})
  - Land: 35.5 sq mi (92.0 km^{2})
  - Water: 0.19 sq mi (0.5 km^{2})
- Elevation: 1,368 ft (417 m)

Population (2020)
  - Total: 2,016
  - Density: 56.8/sq mi (21.9/km^{2})
- Time zone: UTC-6 (Central (CST))
  - Summer (DST): UTC-5 (CDT)
- ZIP codes: 55720
- Area code: 218
- FIPS code: 27-61132
- GNIS feature ID: 0665642
- Website: solwaytownship-mn.gov

Solway Township is a township in Saint Louis County, Minnesota, United States. The population was 2,016 at the 2020 census. Solway Township was named after Solway Firth.

U.S. Highway 2 and State Highway 194 (MN 194) are two of the main routes in the township.

Other routes include Canosia Road (County Road 98), Maple Grove Road (County 6), and Morris Thomas Road (County 56).

U.S. Highway 2 runs roughly diagonally throughout Solway Township, in a northwest–southeast direction. MN 194 runs east–west through the northern portion of the township. Morris Thomas Road (County 56) runs east–west through the southern portion of the township. Canosia Road (County 98) runs north–south through the middle of Solway Township.

The unincorporated community of Munger is located within Solway Township. Munger is located at the junction of U.S. 2 and County Road 223.

== Geography ==
According to the United States Census Bureau, the township has a total area of 35.7 square miles (92 km^{2}); 35.5 square miles (92 km^{2}) is land and 0.2 square miles (0.52 km^{2}), or 0.56%, is water.

The White Pine River and Hay Creek both flow through Solway Township.

=== Adjacent townships ===
The following are adjacent to Solway Township :

- Grand Lake Township (north)
- Canosia Township (northeast)
- Industrial Township (northwest)
- Brevator Township (west)
- Midway Township (southeast)
- Thomson Township of Carlton County (south)
- The city of Hermantown (east)
- The unincorporated area of Saginaw (north and northwest)

Solway Road runs north–south along Solway Township's eastern boundary line with adjacent city of Hermantown.

Saint Louis River Road runs east–west along Solway Township's southern boundary line with adjacent Thomson Township of Carlton County.

Seville Road runs east–west along Solway Township's northern boundary line with adjacent Grand Lake Township.

Crosby Road runs north–south along Solway Township's western boundary line with adjacent Brevator Township.

=== Unincorporated communities ===
- Munger
- Simar

== Demographics ==
As of the census of 2000, there were 1,842 people, 672 households, and 540 families residing in the township. The population density was 51.8 inhabitants per square mile (20.0/km^{2}). There were 701 housing units at an average density of 19.7/sq mi (7.6/km^{2}). The racial makeup of the township was 97.94% White, 0.05% African American, 0.54% Native American, 0.05% Asian, 0.05% Pacific Islander, 0.38% from other races, and 0.98% from two or more races. Hispanic or Latino of any race were 0.43% of the population.

There were 672 households, out of which 38.1% had children under the age of 18 living with them, 67.1% were married couples living together, 8.3% had a female householder with no husband present, and 19.6% were non-families. 15.2% of all households were made up of individuals, and 5.5% had someone living alone who was 65 years of age or older. The average household size was 2.74 and the average family size was 3.03.

In the township the population was spread out, with 27.6% under the age of 18, 6.6% from 18 to 24, 29.2% from 25 to 44, 26.4% from 45 to 64, and 10.2% who were 65 years of age or older. The median age was 39 years. For every 100 females, there were 107.4 males. For every 100 females age 18 and over, there were 104.3 males.

The median income for a household in the township was $46,360, and the median income for a family was $52,578. Males had a median income of $38,836 versus $25,645 for females. The per capita income for the township was $18,510. About 4.3% of families and 4.9% of the population were below the poverty line, including 4.1% of those under age 18 and 7.7% of those age 65 or over.

== See also ==
- U.S. Highway 2
- Minnesota State Highway 194
- Saint Louis County Road 6 – Maple Grove Road
- Saint Louis County Road 56 – Morris Thomas Road
- Saint Louis County Road 98 – Canosia Road
