= Minnesota State Highway 33 =

State highway in Minnesota, United States

Trunk Highway 33
- MN 33 highlighted in red

Route information
- Maintained by MnDOT
- Length: 19.748 mi (31.781 km)
- Existed: April 22, 1933–present

Major junctions
- South end: I-35 at Cloquet
- US 2 at Saginaw
- North end: US 53 at Independence

Location
- Country: United States
- State: Minnesota
- Counties: Carlton, St. Louis

Highway system
- Minnesota Trunk Highway System; Interstate; US; State; Legislative; Scenic
← MN 32	→ MN 34

Minnesota State Highway 33 (MN 33) is a 19.748-mile (31.781 km) state highway in northeast Minnesota, which runs from its interchange with Interstate 35 (I-35) at Cloquet and continues to its northern terminus at its interchange with U.S. Highway 53 (US 53) at Independence. The highway is constructed as a four-lane expressway with a 65 mph (105 km/h) speed limit, except for a short distance through the city of Cloquet, where the route is located on a four-lane city surface street. MN 33 is a bypass of Duluth for travelers headed to the Iron Range of northern Minnesota and International Falls.

== Route description ==
Highway 33 serves as a north–south route between Cloquet and Independence in northeast Minnesota.

The southern terminus of the route is at an interchange with Interstate 35 at Exit 237 on the south side of Cloquet. All Highway 33 southbound traffic must enter the I-35 freeway at this interchange. Heading northbound, Highway 33 has a signal-controlled intersection with Big Lake Road / Doddridge Avenue (County 7) in Cloquet. Highway 33 then travels through the center of Cloquet's downtown area on a four-lane surface street. In downtown Cloquet, the highway runs past the R.W. Lindholm Service Station, which is the only service station designed by famed architect Frank Lloyd Wright. Highway 33 then has a signal-controlled intersection with Cloquet Avenue at downtown Cloquet. Highway 33 then crosses the Saint Louis River. The route then has a signal-controlled intersection with North Road. As it leaves Cloquet heading due north, a 65 MPH speed limit begins and the roadway widens out into a four-lane expressway. Immediately north of Cloquet, Highway 33 crosses into Saint Louis County after its intersection with Saint Louis River Road.

North of Cloquet, the terrain that Highway 33 crosses is mostly rural. The route has an intersection with Morris Thomas Road (County 56) and then with Maple Grove Road (County 6). Highway 33 then reaches the unincorporated area of Saginaw about midway through its route, at its intersection with Saginaw Road (County Roads 46 and 694) and the Canadian National railway crossing. The highway has a diamond interchange with U.S. Highway 2 at Saginaw, the only major interchange on the mainline route of Highway 33. The route continues north and has an intersection with Industrial Road (County 7) and then with County 8.

Highway 33 maintains its rural characteristics up to its northern terminus at a Y-interchange with U.S. Highway 53 at Independence. There is no access from northbound Highway 33 to southbound U.S. 53, so all traffic is required to merge onto northbound U.S. 53. To access southbound U.S. 53 at this point, traffic must take a U-turn at an at-grade crossover past the Y-interchange.

All of Highway 33 is officially designated the Voyageurs Highway. The Voyageurs Highway is a state designation that is also applied to various other state highways in Minnesota, including a portion of U.S. Highway 53.

The route is legally defined as Route 164 in the Minnesota Statutes. It is not marked with this number.

== History ==
Highway 33 was authorized on April 22, 1933. At this time, the highway ran from U.S. Highway 61 north of Atkinson to U.S. Highway 53 at Independence, and was gravel in its entirety except through downtown Cloquet. The original route ran west and south from Cloquet along present-day County Road 7 and County Road 5.

The roadway was paved from the St. Louis River to a point just south of Industrial Road in 1937, and the remainder north to U.S. 53 in 1939. Paving was completed from Cloquet south to U.S. Highway 210 in 1939 as well and the remaining segment between U.S. 61 and U.S. 210 in 1940, making the route paved in its entirety.

The highway was re-routed in 1948 to travel directly south from Cloquet and intersect U.S. 61 near that highway's junction with U.S. 210, shortening it by 5 1/2 miles.

When the portion of I-35 between Otter Creek and Scanlon was constructed in 1966, Highway 33 was shortened to end at the interstate, and upgraded to a four-lane divided highway from this new terminus into Cloquet. The next section to be upgraded to a divided highway was from a point south of U.S. 2 north to U.S. 53 in 1988; the remainder was done in stages through 2003, when the last portion just north of the St. Louis River was completed.

A roundabout was built at the southern terminus of the highway in 2018.

== Major intersections ==
County	Location	mi	km	Destinations	Notes
Carlton	Cloquet	0.000	0.000	I-35 – Duluth, Saint Paul, Minneapolis	
Carlton	Cloquet	1.242	1.999	CR 16 (Washington Avenue)	
Carlton	Cloquet	1.719	2.766	CR 7 (Big Lake Road)	
Carlton	Cloquet	3.369	5.422	CR 2 (North Road)	
St. Louis	Brevator Township	6.671	10.736	CR 56 (Morris Thomas Road)	
St. Louis	Brevator Township	8.654	13.927	CR 6 (Maple Grove Road)	
St. Louis	Brevator Township	11.258	18.118	US 2 – Duluth, Grand Rapids	Interchange
St. Louis	Industrial Township	12.891	20.746	CR 46 (Saginaw Road)	
St. Louis	Industrial Township	14.892	23.966	CR 7 (Industrial Road)	
St. Louis	Industrial Township	16.894	27.188	CR 8	
St. Louis	New Independence Township	19.499	31.381	US 53 north – Virginia	
1.000 mi = 1.609 km; 1.000 km = 0.621 mi
