= Artichoke River =

River in Minnesota, United States

Coordinates: 46°52′11″N 92°36′03″W

The Artichoke River is a 13.5-mile-long (21.7 km) tributary of the Saint Louis River in northeastern Minnesota in the United States.

Via the Saint Louis River, it is part of the watershed of Lake Superior. It flows for its entire length in southern Saint Louis County. Its name in the Ojibwe language is askibwaanikaa-ziibi (river full of Jerusalem artichokes), having the identical name in Ojibwe as the nearby Us-kab-wan-ka River.

The river flows from Artichoke Lake in New Independence Township and flows generally southwardly through Alborn and Culver Townships. It flows into the Saint Louis River from the north in Culver Township, opposite the town of Brookston.

== See also ==
- List of Minnesota rivers
