= Brookston, Minnesota =

City in Minnesota, United States

Brookston, Minnesota Mishkoosoziibiing (Ojibwe)
- City
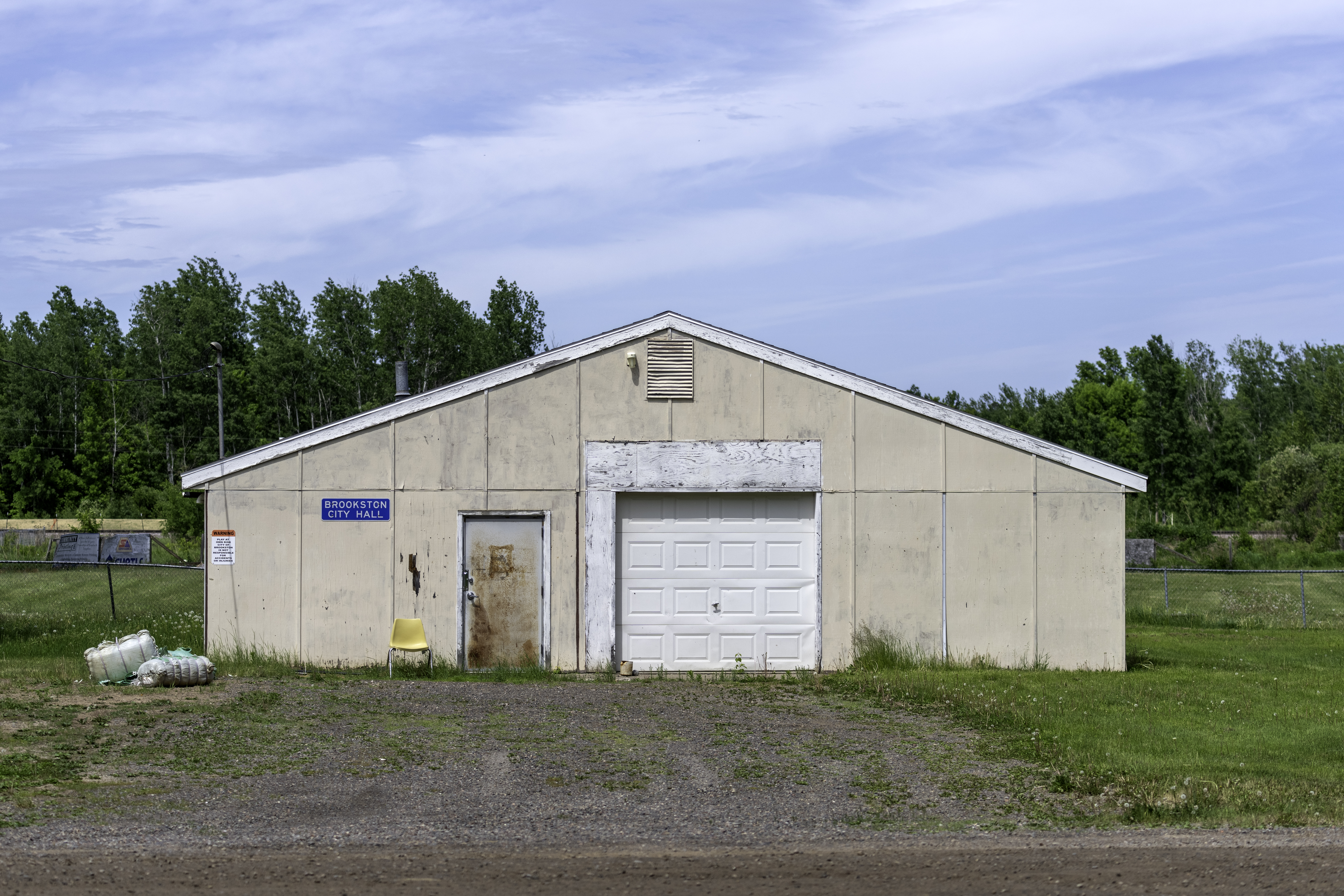
- Brookston City Hall

- Location of the city of Brookston within Saint Louis County, Minnesota
- Coordinates: 46°51′57″N 92°36′12″W
- Country: United States
- State: Minnesota
- County: Saint Louis
- Founded: 1905
- Incorporated: April 13, 1907

Government
  - Mayor: Brenda Hansen

Area
  - Total: 0.55 sq mi (1.42 km^{2})
  - Land: 0.55 sq mi (1.42 km^{2})
  - Water: 0 sq mi (0.00 km^{2})
- Elevation: 1,230 ft (370 m)

Population (2020)
  - Total: 118
  - Estimate (2021): 116
  - Density: 215.6/sq mi (83.25/km^{2})
- Time zone: UTC-6 (CST)
  - Summer (DST): UTC-5 (CDT)
- ZIP code: 55711
- Area code: 218
- FIPS code: 27-08056
- GNIS feature ID: 0660884

Brookston (Ojibwe: Mishkoosoziibiing) is a city in Saint Louis County, Minnesota, United States; located along the Saint Louis River, opposite the mouth of the Artichoke River. The population was 118 at the 2020 census.

Brookston is located 27 miles west of the city of Duluth and 17 miles northwest of the city of Cloquet.

U.S. Highway 2 and Saint Louis County Road 31 (CR 31) are two of the main routes in Brookston.

The city of Brookston is located within Culver Township geographically but is a separate entity. Brookston is politically independent of the township.

Brookston is located on the northern edge of the Fond du Lac Indian Reservation. It is one of three administrative centers of the reservation.

== Geography ==
According to the United States Census Bureau, the city has a total area of 0.55 square miles (1.42 km^{2}), all land.

== History ==
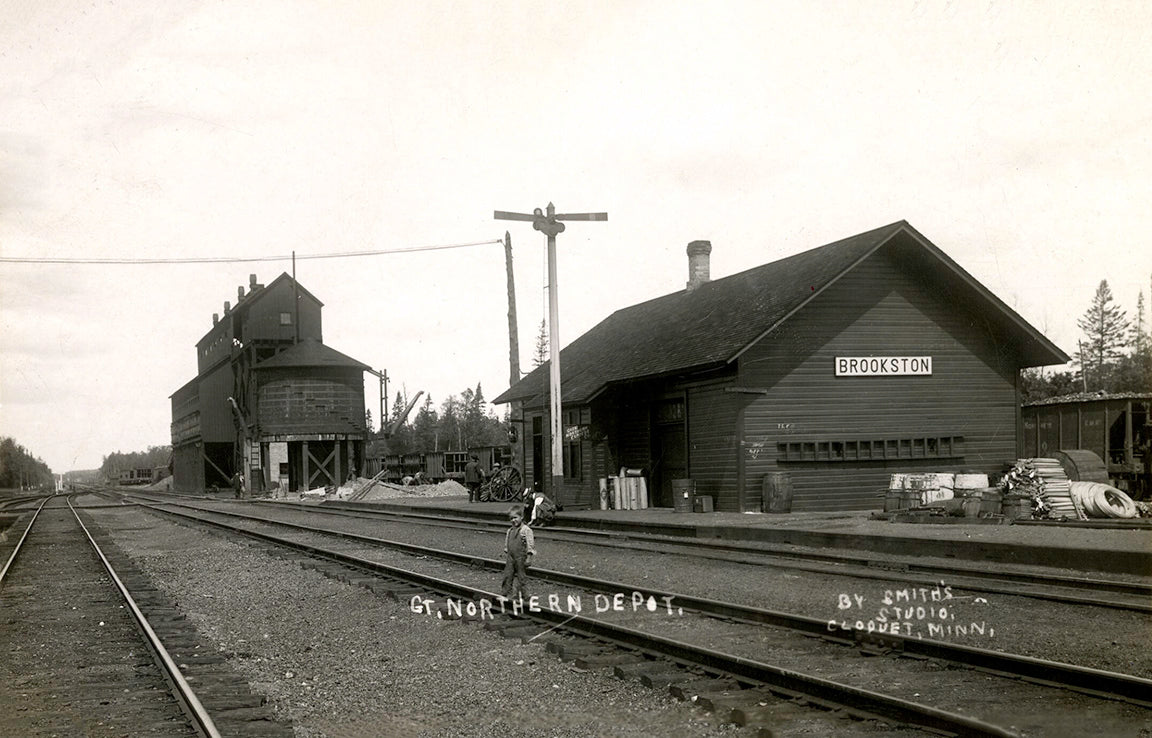
Elevator and Great Northern Depot

Brookston is a city in sections 27 and 34 of Culver Township; it was platted about 1905 and incorporated as a village on April 13, 1907; the post office began in 1899. The city was destroyed by a forest fire in 1918 and rebuilt. It was formerly known as Stoney Brook Junction, the Duluth, Missabe and Iron Range Railroad station located in section 28.

The community's early development was closely connected to the railroad. In 1892, the Duluth, Missabe and Northern Railway completed a 48-mile line between Stoney Brook Junction (present-day Brookston) and the Mountain Iron Mine, providing an important connection between the Mesabi Iron Range and Lake Superior. The line operated in conjunction with the Duluth and Winnipeg Railroad, which carried the ore south and east toward the Lake Superior docks. The railroad helped establish Brookston as an important transportation point during the early development of northeastern Minnesota's iron-mining industry.

== Demographics ==
Historical population
| Census | Pop. | Note | %± |
|---|---|---|---|
| 1910 | 160 | | — |
| 1920 | 135 | | −15.6% |
| 1930 | 144 | | 6.7% |
| 1940 | 135 | | −6.2% |
| 1950 | 180 | | 33.3% |
| 1960 | 144 | | −20.0% |
| 1970 | 137 | | −4.9% |
| 1980 | 124 | | −9.5% |
| 1990 | 107 | | −13.7% |
| 2000 | 98 | | −8.4% |
| 2010 | 141 | | 43.9% |
| 2020 | 118 | | −16.3% |
| 2021 (est.) | 116 | | −1.7% |
U.S. Decennial Census; 2020 Census

=== 2010 census ===
As of the census of 2010, there were 141 people, 38 households and 27 families living in the city. The population density was 256.4 inhabitants per square mile (99.0/km^{2}). There were 39 housing units at an average density of 70.9 per square mile (27.4/km^{2}). The racial makeup of the city was 74.5% White, 7.1% African American, 14.9% Native American and 3.5% from two or more races.

There were 38 households, of which 39.5% had children under the age of 18 living with them, 47.4% were married couples living together, 18.4% had a female householder with no husband present, 5.3% had a male householder with no wife present, and 28.9% were non-families. 28.9% of all households were made up of individuals, and 10.5% had someone living alone who was 65 years of age or older. The average household size was 2.63 and the average family size was 3.19.

The median age was 40.3 years. 21.3% of residents were under the age of 18; 10.7% were between the ages of 18 and 24; 27% were from 25 to 44; 20.7% were from 45 to 64; and 20.6% were 65 years of age or older. The gender makeup was 63.1% male and 36.9% female.

=== 2000 census ===
As of the census of 2000, there were 98 people, 38 households and 28 families living in the city. The population density was 175.9 inhabitants per square mile (67.9/km^{2}). There were 38 housing units at an average density of 68.2 per square mile (26.3/km^{2}). The racial makeup of the city was 82.65% White, 1.02% African American, 8.16% Native American, and 8.16% from two or more races. Hispanic or Latino of any race were 1.02% of the population. 68.2% were of Finnish, 12.1% Danish and 10.6% Swedish ancestry.

There were 38 households, of which 31.6% had children under the age of 18 living with them, 52.6% were married couples living together, 10.5% had a female householder with no husband present, and 23.7% were non-families. 18.4% of all households were made up of individuals, and 7.9% had someone living alone who was 65 years of age or older. The average household size was 2.58 and the average family size was 2.93.

29.6% of the population were under the age of 18, 7.1% from 18 to 24, 32.7% from 25 to 44, 12.2% from 45 to 64, and 18.4% who were 65 years of age or older. The median age was 33 years. For every 100 females, there were 117.8 males. For every 100 females age 18 and over, there were 86.5 males.

The median household income was $32,917 and the median family income was $40,625. Males had a median income of $40,625 compared with $18,750 for females. The per capita income was $14,009. There were no families and 5.3% of the population living below the poverty line, including no under eighteens and 23.5% of those over 64.
