= Cloquet River =

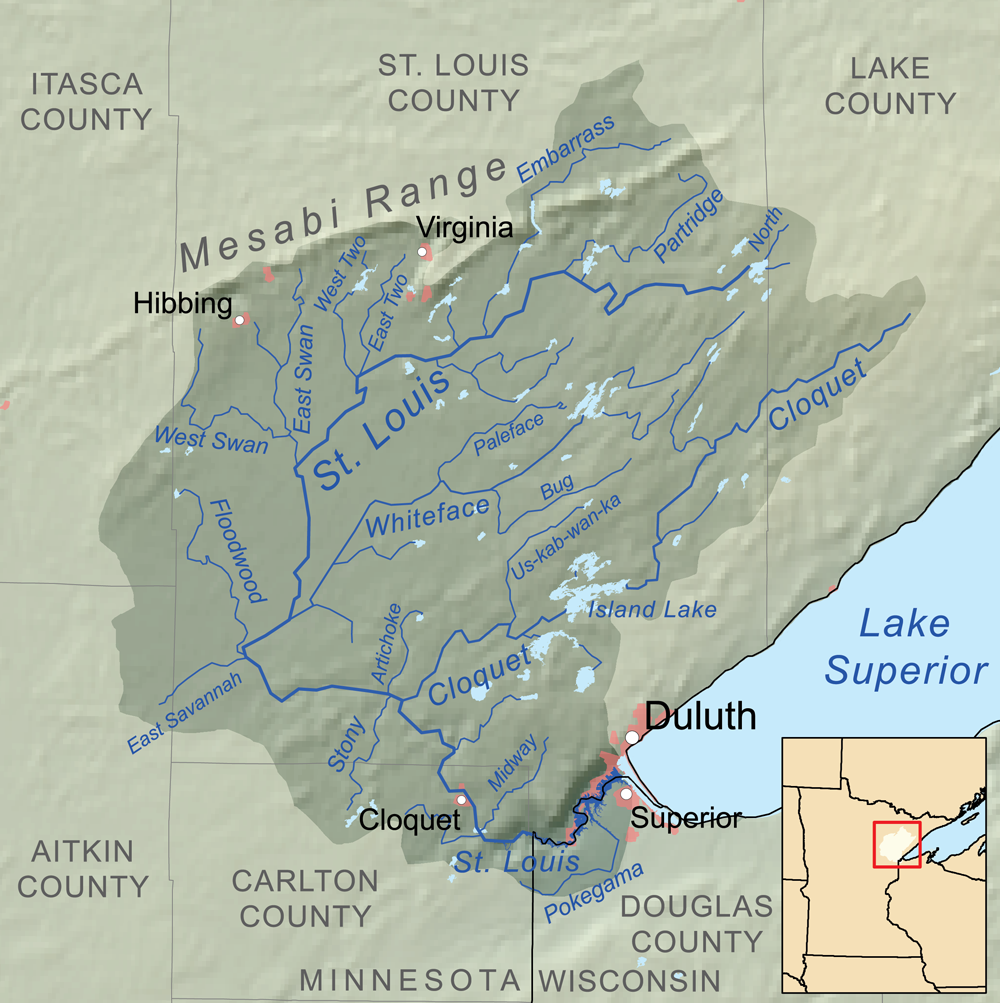
- Map of the Saint Louis River drainage basin showing the Cloquet River

- Mouth of the Cloquet River

Location
- Country: United States
- State: Minnesota
- Counties: Lake, St. Louis

Physical characteristics
- Source
  - location: Cloquet Lake, Silver Creek Township, Lake County, Minnesota
  - coordinates: 47.4313058°N 91.4865513°W
- Mouth
  - location: Saint Louis River at Culver Township, St. Louis County, Minnesota
  - coordinates: 46°51′41″N 92°34′13″W
- Length: 104 miles (167 km)

Basin features
- Progression: Cloquet River→ Saint Louis River→ Lake Superior

The Cloquet River (/kloʊˈkeɪ/ kloh-KAY) is a 104-mile-long (167 km) river in Minnesota, United States. It is the main tributary of the Saint Louis River.

== Name ==
The Cloquet River is known in the Ojibwe language as the Gaa-biitootigweyaag-ziibi ("River that parallels (the Saint Louis River)"). On the map of Stephen H. Long's expedition in 1823, it shows that stream as "Rapid River", and it is unnamed on the map by David Thompson in 1826 for the proposed routes of the international boundary. However, on the 1843 Joseph N. Nicollet map, the river is identified by its present name.

== Geography ==
The Cloquet River generally flows in a southwesterly direction through Indian Lake, Alden Lake, and Island Lake, before emptying into the Saint Louis River.

One can separate the river into two primary stretches, the upper stretch beginning at Cloquet Lake in Lake County as a small stream and ending at Island Lake.

Tributaries of the Cloquet River include the Us-kab-wan-ka River, the Beaver River, and Little Cloquet River.

== See also ==
- List of rivers of Minnesota
- List of longest streams of Minnesota
