= U.S. Route 53 =

U.S. Highway in Minnesota and Wisconsin

U.S. Route 53
- US 53 highlighted in red

Route information
- Length: 404 mi (650 km)
- Existed: 1926–present

Major junctions
- South end: US 14 / US 61 / WIS 16 at La Crosse, WI
- I-90 at La Crosse, WI; I-94 at Eau Claire, WI; US 12 at Altoona, WI; WIS 29 at Lake Hallie, WI; US 63 at Spooner, WI; US 2 at Superior, WI; I-35 / I-535 at Duluth, MN; MN 33 at Independence, MN; US 169 at Virginia, MN; MN 1 at Cook, MN; US 71 / MN 11 at Int'l. Falls, MN
- North end: Highway 71 to Highway 11 at Fort Frances, ON

Location
- Country: United States
- States: Wisconsin, Minnesota
- Counties: WI: La Crosse, Trempealeau, Eau Claire, Chippewa, Barron, Washburn, Douglas; MN: St. Louis, Koochiching

Highway system
- United States Numbered Highway System; List; Special; Divided
- Wisconsin State Trunk Highway System; Interstate; US; State; Scenic; Rustic
- Minnesota Trunk Highway System; Interstate; US; State; Legislative; Scenic
← US 52	US	→ US 54
← WIS 52	WI	→ WIS 53
← US 52	MN	→ MN 54

U.S. Highway 53 (U.S. 53), is a north–south U.S. Highway that runs for 404 miles (650 km) from La Crosse, Wisconsin, to International Falls, Minnesota. It is the primary north–south route in northwestern Wisconsin, serving as a vital link between Interstate 94 (I-94) at Eau Claire, Wisconsin, and the Twin Ports of Superior, Wisconsin, and Duluth, Minnesota. The entire route from Eau Claire to the city limits of Superior is a four-lane divided highway. The highway's northern terminus is at the Fort Frances–International Falls International Bridge in International Falls, at the Canadian border. Its southern terminus is in La Crosse, Wisconsin, at US 14.

== Route description ==
=== Wisconsin ===
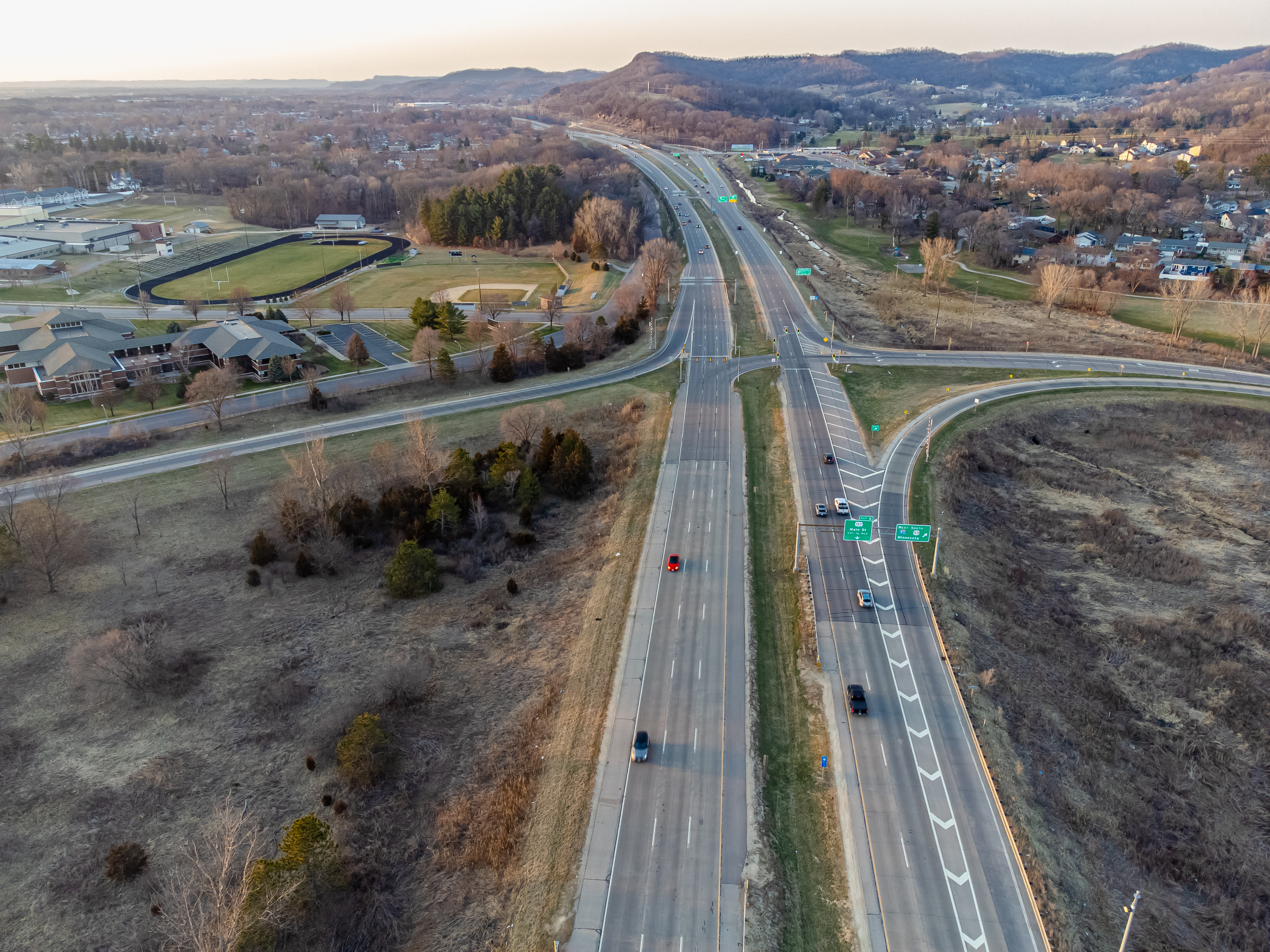
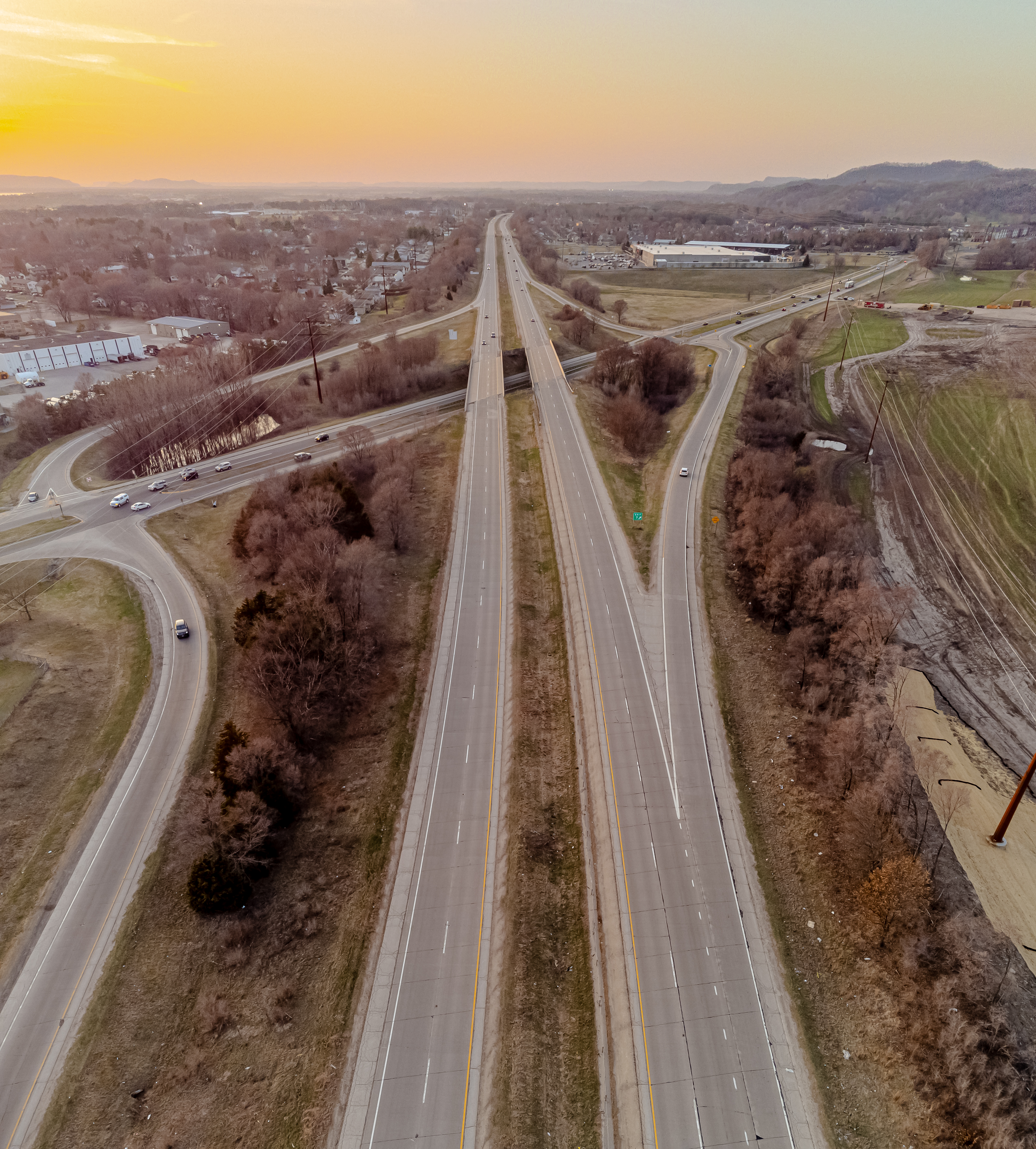
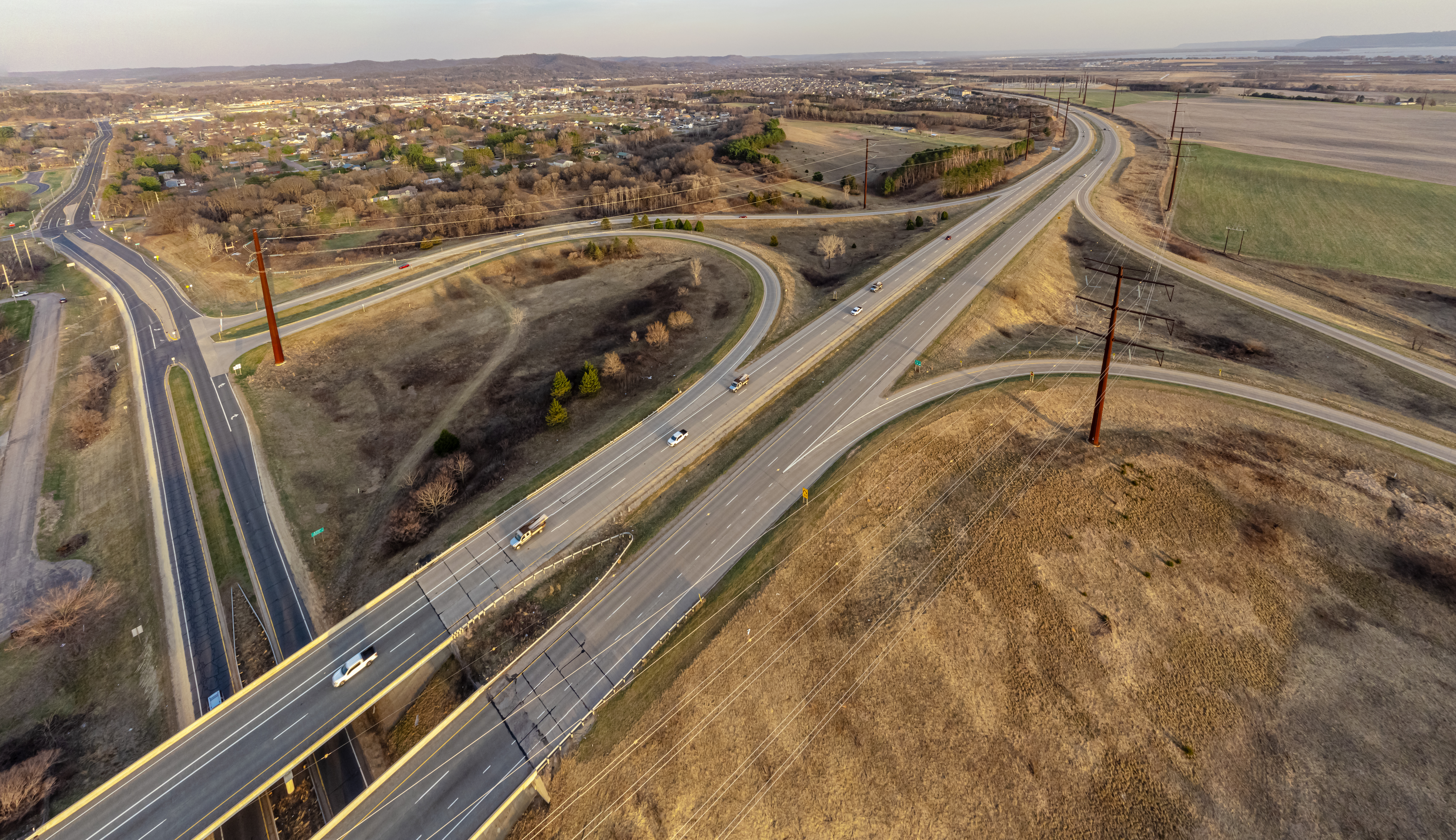
At the start of US 53 in La Crosse, Onalaska, and Holmen

US 53 begins at its southern terminus with a junction at US 14, US 61, and Wisconsin Highway 16 (WIS 16) in downtown La Crosse. From there, US 53 crosses I-90 and becomes a freeway bypass of Onalaska and Holmen before proceeding north to Eau Claire as a two-lane roadway. The interchange with I-94 at Eau Claire begins a freeway/expressway stretch for US 53 north to the city limits of Superior. The c. 2006 freeway in Eau Claire bypasses most of the city, alleviating congestion on the original route (signed now as both Business US 53 and Hastings Way). Business US 53/Hastings Way is a mix of grade-separated interchanges and at-grade intersections, and is routed through Eau Claire, passing within about one mile (1.6 km) of downtown Eau Claire. Other smaller towns between Eau Claire and Superior (Minong and Solon Springs) were bypassed in a similar manner.

Wisconsin's first single-point urban interchange is found along the US 53 bypass of Eau Claire, at its interchange with US 12 in Altoona. This interchange received the 2005 Outstanding Highway Construction award from the Bureau of Project Development.

US 53 continues as a freeway north of Eau Claire past Chippewa Falls to Rice Lake, where it then becomes an expressway with only three grade-separated interchanges (one at 28th Avenue (CTH-V) in Haugen, one at WIS 70 near Spooner and one at WIS 13, immediately southeast of Superior). US 53 has a partial grade-separated interchange with US 2 in the town of Amnicon, but traffic turning from US 2 westbound onto US 53 southbound must take a U-turn at an at-grade crossover past the interchange.

After passing through the city of Superior as a four-lane city surface street (East Second Street) for a five-mile (8.0 km) stretch, US 53 then approaches the Saint Louis Bay. US 53 then runs together with I-535 and crosses the bay via the John Blatnik Bridge into Minnesota.

=== Minnesota ===
US 53 enters the state at the city of Duluth on the John Blatnik Bridge over the Saint Louis Bay. US 53 runs concurrently with I-535 for 2.8 miles (4.5 km) as it enters Minnesota. I-535/US 53 has an interchange with I-35 in Duluth, known locally as the Can of Worms; it features a pair of left exits from I-35, a stoplight and lane drops over the I-35 bridge.

After its junction with I-35, US 53 continues through Duluth on Piedmont Avenue and Trinity Road for 3.5 miles (5.6 km). US 53 then runs concurrently with State Highway 194 (MN 194) for six miles (9.7 km), from Trinity Road in Duluth to Lindahl Road in the city of Hermantown. This four-lane stretch of US 53 and MN 194 are also known as the Miller Trunk Highway in the cities of Duluth and Hermantown.

From Hermantown, the route proceeds north to the city of Virginia. The portion of the route from Duluth to Virginia is a four-lane expressway. US 53 has a junction with MN 33 at the unincorporated community of Independence. Continuing northbound, US 53 has an interchange with US 169 in Virginia. In between the US 169 and MN 135 interchanges is the Thomas Rukavina Memorial Bridge. This bridge is the tallest in the state and spans four lanes of freeway. Immediately north of Virginia, US 53 has an interchange with MN 169 in Wuori Township.

US 53 then proceeds northwest to International Falls, where it has a junction with US 71 and MN 11.

US 53 in Minnesota passes through Saint Louis and Koochiching counties. Legally, the Minnesota section of US 53 is defined as unmarked legislative routes 106, 11, and 315 in Minnesota Statutes §§ 161.115(37), (246), and 161.114(2). US 53 is not marked with these legislative numbers along the actual highway.

==== Designations ====
- A portion of US 53 in Minnesota is officially designated the Voyageur Highway. The Voyageur Highway is a state designation that is also applied to various other state highways in Minnesota.
- The portion of US 53 from the city limits of Virginia to MN 11 in International Falls was designated as Speaker Irvin N. Anderson Memorial Highway in 2009 in honor of former State House Speaker Irv Anderson.
- The 2008 Minnesota Legislature named US 53 between Superior Street and Central Entrance in the city of Duluth as Walter F. Mondale Drive. On June 12, 2008, this section of highway (Piedmont Avenue and Trinity Road) was dedicated as Walter F. Mondale Drive in honor of the former vice president's public service.

== History ==
US 53 was extended into Minnesota in 1934. When marked, it was paved from the Wisconsin border to its junction with US 169 in Virginia, on a short segment between Britt and Idington, and from Cusson to the Canadian border. The segment from Virginia to Britt was paved during that year, and the remainder was paved in 1935.

A bypass around Virginia was completed in 1964 and opened to traffic that November; MN 135 was extended along the previous alignment through the city.

The expressway section between Duluth and Virginia was constructed by 1970, except the portion between Four Corners and Independence.

In 1989, the entirety of US 53 in Wisconsin was designated the Peace Memorial Highway, commemorating citizens of Wisconsin who have worked to promote international peace.

A new four-lane divided highway section of US 53 in Duluth was constructed in 2004. This section of the route is known locally as Piedmont Avenue. Previously, from 1934 to 2004, this same section of US 53 was a narrow two-lane roadway that had proceeded up the hill to a seven-legged intersection that had included Duluth's Skyline Parkway. Locally, this now-defunct famous intersection, had been known for 70 years by the name Seven Corners.

A new US 53 interchange with MN 169 in Wuori Township was built in 2006.

A four-lane expressway from north of the city of Virginia to the south city limits of Cook was constructed beginning in 2009 as part of a long-range goal of providing a four-lane highway to Canada as part of the Falls-to-Falls Corridor. The first stage, from approximately County Road 307 to 0.25 miles (0.40 km)} south of County Road 652 (Goodell Road), was completed in 2009; the second stage was completed in the fall of 2013.

In the 2020s, the US 53 corridor in Wisconsin was designated as an Alternative Fuel Corridor for electric vehicles.

=== Relocation between Eveleth and Virginia ===
On May 5, 2010, Cliffs Natural Resources provided notice to the Minnesota Department of Transportation (MnDOT) that US Highway 53 easement rights across the United Taconite Mine, per a 1960 agreement, would be terminated to allow for expansion of the mine. United Taconite and MnDOT negotiated an agreement to move the roadway by 2017.

There were three rerouting options proposed:

- West – Following MN 37 and County Road 7.
- Center – Through the Auburn Pit; on the south side of the existing route of US 53.
- East – Around and across the Rouchleau Pit; on the north side of the existing route of US 53.

The east route was selected for the project and construction began in November 2015; the realignment reached completion in 2017. On September 15, the new roadway opened, with a dedication of the bridge spanning the Rouchleau Pit. The bridge is the tallest in the state at 204 feet (62 m) in height.

== Falls-to-Falls Corridor ==
The Falls-to-Falls Corridor (officially The Falls-to-Falls Corridor—United States Route 53 from International Falls on the Minnesota/Canada border to Chippewa Falls, Wisconsin) is, by the United States federal government, a recognized trade corridor.

In the 1990s, the federal government listed the corridor as a priority for development. The primary development planned is infrastructure-related, specifically, a highway project hoped to spur economic development in northwestern Wisconsin and northeastern Minnesota by widening US 53 to full expressway standards from Chippewa Falls, Wisconsin to International Falls, Minnesota. I-535 forms the only section of the route that is part of the Interstate Highway System.

=== Wisconsin ===
With the exception of a five-mile (8.0 km) stretch as a four-lane city surface street (East Second Street) in the city of Superior, the entire route within Wisconsin is completed to freeway or expressway standards. On the southern end of the corridor, the connection to I-94 is a 7.5-mile (12.1 km) stretch through the Eau Claire-Chippewa Falls conurbation. After years of legal and political wrangling, the decision was made in the late 1990s to bypass the current route, rather than to convert the present highway to freeway standards. The northern half of this bypass, as far south as WIS 312 was opened to traffic in mid-2005. The southern half of the bypass, which includes a pair of multilane bridges over the Eau Claire River, goes mostly through Altoona and includes interchanges with WIS 312, US 12 and WIS 93. This project won multiple awards in 2005 and 2006. This section of the bypass was opened mid-morning on August 21, 2006.

=== Minnesota ===
Federal funding for the project in northern Minnesota was $940,000 in 2003 and nearly $600,000 in 2004. At present, with the exception of 3.5 miles (5.6 km) stretch within the city of Duluth (Piedmont Avenue and Trinity Road), the route is completed as an expressway as far north as the city of Cook, leaving approximately 73 miles (117 km) of the route to International Falls to be converted to expressway standards.

== Major intersections ==
State	County/Division	Location	mi	km	Exit	Destinations	Notes
Wisconsin	La Crosse	La Crosse	0.00	0.00		WIS 16 east (Cameron Street) / US 14 east / US 61 / Great River Road south / Alt. I-90 west	Cameron St. is a one-way street; southern terminus of southbound US 53; I-90 Alt. follows US 14/WI 16 (Cameron St.); road continues as US 14 east/US 61/GRR south (3rd Street south)
Wisconsin	La Crosse	La Crosse	0.00	0.00		WIS 16 (Cass Street) / US 14 west / US 61 north / Great River Road / Alt. I-90 east – La Crescent	Cass St. is a one-way street; southern terminus of northbound US 53; I-90 Alt. follows US 14/WI 16 west (Cass St.); road continues north from US 14/US 61/GRR (4th Street)
Wisconsin	La Crosse	La Crosse				WIS 35 south (George Street)	Southern end of WIS 35 overlap
Wisconsin	La Crosse	La Crosse	4	6.4		I-90 west / WIS 35 north / Great River Road north – Minnesota, Onalaska	Northern end of WIS 35 overlap; southern end of I-90 overlap; I-90 exit 3
Wisconsin	La Crosse	Onalaska				I-90 east / WIS 157 east – Madison, LaCrosse	South end of expressway; northern end of I-90 overlap; southern end of WIS 157 overlap; I-90 exit 4
Wisconsin	La Crosse	Onalaska			6	WIS 157 west / CTH-OS (Main Street)	Northern end of WIS 157 overlap
Wisconsin	La Crosse	Onalaska			7	CTH-S (Sand Lake Road)	
Wisconsin	La Crosse	Holmen			9	CTH-OT – Midway	
Wisconsin	La Crosse	Holmen			11	WIS 35 south / CTH-HD / Great River Road (Holmen Drive)	Southern end of WIS 35 overlap
Wisconsin	La Crosse	Holmen			13	CTH-MH (McHugh Road)	
Wisconsin	La Crosse	Holmen			15	WIS 35 north / CTH-HD / Great River Road – Holmen, Trempealeau WIS 93 begins	North end of expressway; northern end of WIS 35 overlap; southern end of WIS 93 overlap
Wisconsin	Trempealeau	Town of Gale				WIS 54 east – Melrose	Eastern end of WIS 54 overlap
Wisconsin	Trempealeau	Galesville	23	37		WIS 54 west / WIS 93 north – Centerville	Western end of WIS 54 overlap; northern end of WIS 93 overlap
Wisconsin	Trempealeau	Blair				WIS 95 east – Blair, Hixton	Eastern end of WIS 95 overlap
Wisconsin	Trempealeau	Town of Preston				WIS 95 west – Arcadia	Western end of WIS 95 overlap
Wisconsin	Trempealeau	Whitehall				WIS 121 west – Independence	Southern end of WIS 121 overlap
Wisconsin	Trempealeau	Pigeon Falls				WIS 121 east – Northfield	Northern end of WIS 121 overlap
Wisconsin	Trempealeau	Osseo	69	111		US 10 east / Alt. I-94 east – Fairchild, Neillsville	Eastern end of US 10 and Alternate I-94 overlap
Wisconsin	Trempealeau	Town of Sumner	70	110		US 10 west – Mondovi	Western end of US 10 overlap
Wisconsin	Eau Claire	Eau Claire	86	138	84	I-94 – Madison, St. Paul	Cloverleaf interchange; south end of freeway; southbound exits signed as 84A (east) and 84B (west); no exit numbers northbound
Wisconsin	Eau Claire	Eau Claire			85	CTH-AA / Golf Road	
Wisconsin	Eau Claire	Eau Claire			86	Bus. US 53 (Hastings Way) / WIS 93 south – La Crosse	US 53 Business only signed northbound
Wisconsin	Eau Claire	Altoona	89	143	87	US 12 (Clairemont Avenue) – Fairchild, Eau Claire	Wisconsin's first SPUI
Wisconsin	Eau Claire	Altoona			89	River Prairie Drive	
Wisconsin	Eau Claire	Eau Claire			90	WIS 312 / CTH-Q (North Crossing)	
Wisconsin	Chippewa	Lake Hallie			92	Melby Street	
Wisconsin	Chippewa	Lake Hallie			94	Bus. US 53 / WIS 124 / CTH-OO / Alt. US 53 – Chippewa Falls, Lake Hallie	
Wisconsin	Chippewa	Lake Hallie			95	WIS 29 / Alt. I-94 west – Menomonie, Green Bay	Signed as exits 95A (east) and 95B (west), western end of Alternate I-94 overlap
Wisconsin	Chippewa	Chippewa Falls			96	Bus. WIS 29 / CTH-X / Alt. US 53 – Menomonie, Chippewa Falls	
Wisconsin	Chippewa	Town of Tilden			99	CTH-S – Chippewa Falls, Jim Falls	
Wisconsin	Chippewa	Town of Tilden			102	CTH-B – Tilden	
Wisconsin	Chippewa	Bloomer			110	WIS 40 – Bloomer, Colfax	
Wisconsin	Chippewa	Town of Bloomer			112	WIS 64 – Cornell, New Richmond	
Wisconsin	Chippewa	New Auburn			118	CTH-M – New Auburn	
Wisconsin	Barron	Town of Chetek			126	CTH-I – Chetek	
Wisconsin	Barron	Cameron	137	220	135	US 8 – Barron, Cameron	
Wisconsin	Barron	Rice Lake			140	CTH-O – Rice Lake	
Wisconsin	Barron	Rice Lake			143	WIS 48 – Rice Lake, Cumberland	
Wisconsin	Barron	Oak Grove				26th Avenue	At-grade intersection; north end of freeway
Wisconsin	Barron	Oak Grove			150	CTH-V (28th Avenue) – Haugen	Interchange
Wisconsin	Washburn	Town of Sarona				WIS 253 north – Spooner	
Wisconsin	Washburn	Town of Spooner			165	WIS 70 – Spooner, Stone Lake	Interchange
Wisconsin	Washburn	Town of Spooner	167	269	168	US 63 south – Spooner, Shell Lake	Interchange; southern end of US 63 overlap
Wisconsin	Washburn	Town of Trego			172	US 63 north / CTH-E – Hayward	Northern end of US 63 overlap
Wisconsin	Washburn	Minong				Bus. US 53 north	
Wisconsin	Washburn	Minong				WIS 77 – Minong, Danbury	
Wisconsin	Washburn	Minong				Bus. US 53 south	
Wisconsin	Douglas	Solon Springs				Bus. US 53 north	
Wisconsin	Douglas	Solon Springs				Bus. US 53 south	
Wisconsin	Douglas	Town of Amnicon	226	364	222	US 2 east – Ashland	Interchange; southern end of US 2 overlap; no southbound entrance
Wisconsin	Douglas	Town of Amnicon				CTH-C to US 53 south – Spooner, Eau Claire	Provides U-turn to US 53 south for travelers coming from US 2 west
Wisconsin	Douglas	Town of Parkland			227	WIS 13 south / CTH-Z / LSCT east – Port Wing, Bayfield	Interchange
Wisconsin	Douglas	Superior	237	381		US 2 / LSCT west – Duluth	Northern end of US 2 overlap; southern end of US 2 Truck
Wisconsin	Douglas	Superior				Truck US 2 west	Northern end of US 2 Truck overlap
Wisconsin	Douglas	Superior	239	385		I-535 begins / WIS 35 south – Duluth	South end of freeway; southern end of I-535 overlap
St. Louis Bay			240 0.000	390 0.000	John A. Blatnik Bridge		
Minnesota	St. Louis	Duluth	0.536– 0.705	0.863– 1.135	—	Garfield Avenue	
Minnesota	St. Louis	Duluth	1.421– 1.675	2.287– 2.696	—	I-35 / I-535 ends / LSCT – St. Paul, Minneapolis	Northern end of I-535 overlap
Minnesota	St. Louis	Duluth			—	W. Superior Street / 21st Avenue N.	
Minnesota	St. Louis	Duluth				6th Street	At-grade intersection; north end of freeway
Minnesota	St. Louis	Duluth				MN 194 east (Central Entrance)	Southern end of MN 194 overlap
Minnesota	St. Louis	Hermantown	11.526	18.549		MN 194 west to US 2 – Grand Rapids	Northern end of MN 194 overlap
Minnesota	St. Louis	New Independence Township	24.134	38.840		MN 33 south – Cloquet	
Minnesota	St. Louis	Fayal Township	55.871	89.916		MN 37 west – Hibbing	Interchange; southern end of MN 37 overlap
Minnesota	St. Louis	Eveleth	60.028– 60.530	96.606– 97.414		MN 37 east – Gilbert	Interchange; northern end of MN 37 overlap
Minnesota	St. Louis	Virginia	63.054– 63.506	101.476– 102.203		MN 135 north – Gilbert	Interchange
Minnesota	St. Louis	Virginia	64.144	103.230		2nd Avenue West	Former MN 135 / US 53 Bus.
Minnesota	St. Louis	Virginia	65.716– 66.029	105.760– 106.263		US 169 south – Mountain Iron, Hibbing, Grand Rapids	Interchange
Minnesota	St. Louis	Virginia	66.753	107.429		CSAH 102 (9th Street North)	Former MN 135
Minnesota	St. Louis	Wuori Township	68.648	110.478		CSAH 103 – Virginia	Former US 53 Bus.
Minnesota	St. Louis	Wuori Township	70.387– 71.031	113.277– 114.313		MN 169 north – Tower, Ely	Interchange
Minnesota	St. Louis	Sherman Corner	87.140	140.238		MN 1 east / CSAH 22 – Tower, Ely	Southern end of MN 1 overlap
Minnesota	St. Louis	Field Township	94.168	151.549		MN 1 west / CSAH 115 – Effie, Northome	Northern end of MN 1 overlap
Minnesota	St. Louis	Field Township	101.030	162.592		MN 73 south – Chisholm, Hibbing	
Minnesota	Koochiching	Ray	146.275	235.407		MN 217 west – Littlefork	
Minnesota	Koochiching	Rainy Lake	160.218	257.846		CSAH 332	Formerly MN 332
Minnesota	Koochiching	International Falls	163.968	263.881		MN 11 west (3rd Avenue)	Western end of MN 11 overlap
Minnesota	Koochiching	International Falls	164.040	263.997		MN 11 east (4th Street) – Island View	Eastern end of MN 11 overlap
Minnesota	Koochiching	International Falls	164.105	264.101		US 71 south (3rd Street) – Bemidji	Southern end of US 71 overlap
Canada–United States border	Rainy River		164.361	264.513		Fort Frances–International Falls International Bridge (Note: Canada-bound drivers pay US$7 to cross bridge. No toll for US-bound drivers.)	
Canada–United States border	Rainy River		164.361	264.513		Highway 71 north – Fort Frances	Northern end of US 71 overlap; continuation into Canada
1.000 mi = 1.609 km; 1.000 km = 0.621 mi: Concurrency terminus; Tolled

== See also ==
- List of U.S. Routes
