= Junction (traffic) =

Location where traffic can change

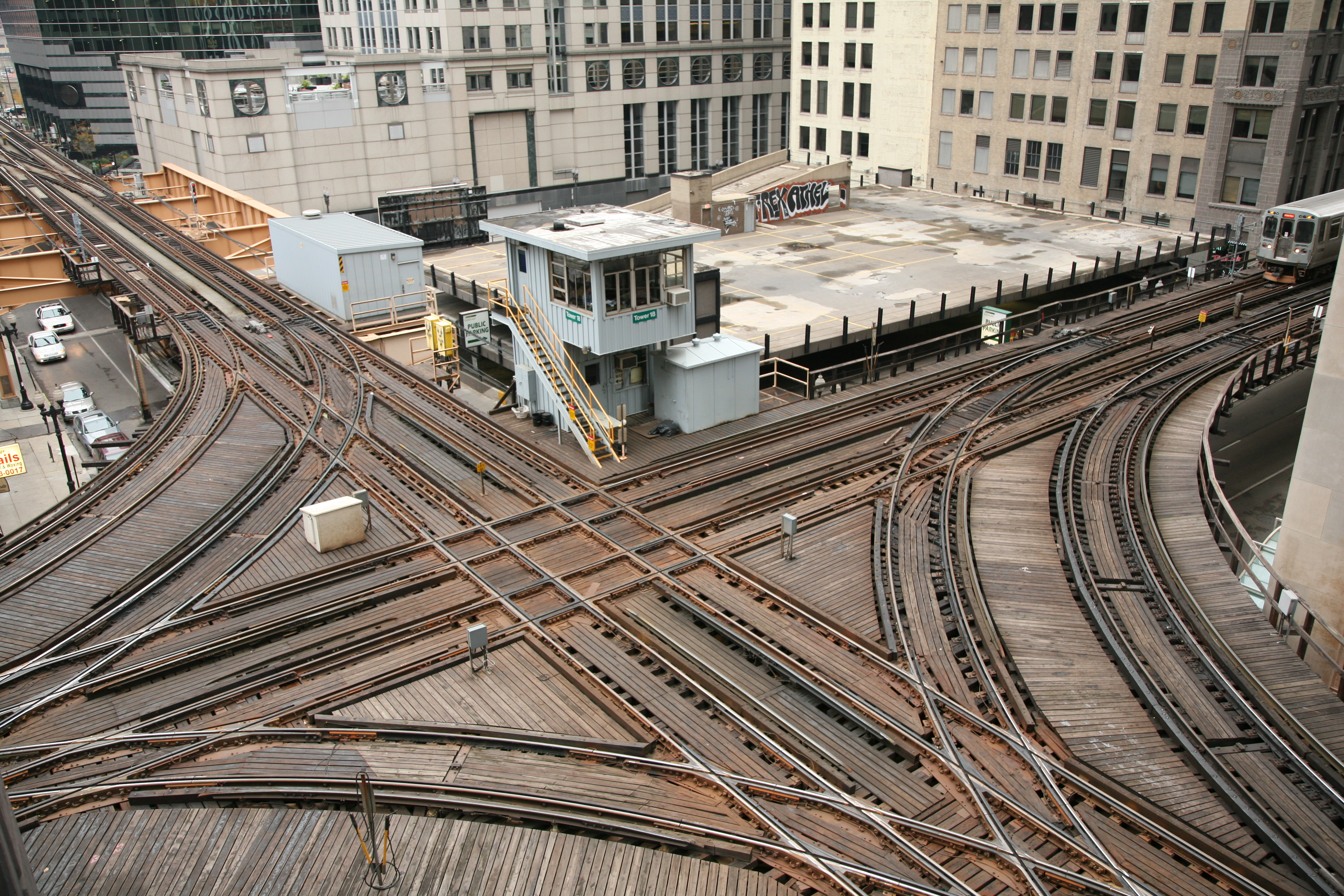
Chicago Transit Authority signal tower 18 guides elevated Chicago 'L' north and southbound Purple and Brown lines intersecting with east and westbound Pink and Green lines and the looping Orange line above the Wells and Lake street intersection in the loop.

A junction, when discussed in the context of transport, is a location where traffic can change between different routes, directions, or sometimes modes, of travel.

== Etymology ==
The word "junction" derives from Latin iunctus, past participle of iungere, to join. The word "junction" in this context may also refer to:

- The general locality of a given interchange
- A specific interchange on a major road, e.g. motorway. This is the common use in the United Kingdom. For example, Milton Keynes is said to be "off junction 13" of the M1.

== History ==
Historically, many cities and market towns developed wherever there was a junction. A road intersection offered opportunities for rest or trade for travellers and merchants. Towns sprang up to accommodate this; the first such in Europe were probably at intersections of the Roman roads.

A similar effect came with the growth of rail transport; so-called railway towns grew up near major railway junctions – originally to accommodate railway workers, but expanding into fully functioning settlements over time.

Junctions also developed where different modes of transport intersected, e.g. canal and rail.

== Junctions for specific transport modes ==
See main articles: Road junction and Junction (rail).

There are many types of different junction for road transport and rail transport (including metro and rapid transit systems). If many of these are contained in a small area, and where passengers can change from one transport mode to the other in them, it is said to be a transport hub.
