= List of crossings of the Saint Louis River =

This is a list of crossings of the Saint Louis River, in the U.S. states of Minnesota and Wisconsin.

== Minnesota ==
Crossing	Carries	Location	Coordinates
Unnamed railroad bridge	Northshore Mining railroad	Bassett Township	47°29′29″N 91°50′46″W
Unnamed railroad bridge		Bassett Township	47°29′29″N 91°50′47″W
Unnamed railroad bridge	CN	Bassett Township	47°28′24″N 91°59′19″W
Bridge No. 69586	CSAH 110; FFH 11 (Superior National Forest Scenic Byway)	Bassett Township	47°28′52″N 92°02′24″W
Unnumbered highway bridge	NF-790	Saint Louis County (near Hoyt Lakes)	47°27′58″N 92°07′06″W
Unnumbered highway bridge	NF-130 (Moose Line Road)	Saint Louis County (near Hoyt Lakes)	47°28′22″N 92°07′17″W
Bridge No. 7183	CSAH 100	White Township	47°29′33″N 92°14′18″W
Bridge No. 69531	Evergreen Road	Biwabik Township	47°27′41″N 92°18′19″W
Bridge No. 69518	CR 4 (Vermillion Trail)	Saint Louis County (near Biwabik Township)	47°26′00″N 92°19′19″W
Bridge No. 69555	CR 100 (Lost Lake Road)	Saint Louis County (near Biwabik Township)	47°25′27″N 92°21′27″W
Bridge No. 69510	CR 95 (Bodas Road)	Saint Louis County (near Fayal Township)	47°24′03″N 92°22′39″W
Bridge No. 69538	Fayal Township Road 9132 (E Town Line Road)	Fayal Township	47°22′18″N 92°28′00″W
US 53 Bridges (Bridge Nos. 6602 and 69020)	US 53	Saint Louis County (near Fayal Township)	47°22′02″N 92°30′20″W
Unnamed bridge	Recreation/pedestrian	Saint Louis County (near Fayal Township)	47°22′02″N 92°30′21″W
Unnamed railroad bridge	CN	Peary	47°22′12″N 92°33′19″W
Forbes Dam	Evtac Road	Forbes	47°22′20″N 92°34′34″W
Bridge No. 69609	CSAH 7	Forbes	47°21′45″N 92°35′55″W
Unnamed railroad bridge	CN	Forbes	47°21′41″N 92°36′13″W
Bridge No. 69634	CR 312 (Norway Ridge Road)	Zim	47°18′50″N 92°39′46″W
Bridge No. 69623	CR 27 (Zim Road)	Zim	47°18′20″N 92°39′35″W
Unnamed railroad bridge	BNSF	Lavell Township	47°16′06″N 92°43′24″W
Bridge No. 69508	CR 230 (Lavell Road)	Lavell Township	47°12′39″N 92°47′23″W
Bridge No. 69541	CR 52 (Arkola Road)	Toivola Township	47°10′01″N 92°46′47″W
Bridge No. 69539	CR 741 (Meadowlands Trunk Road)	Elmer Township	47°06′33″N 92°46′16″W
Unnamed bridge	Alborn-Pengilly Trail	Elmer Township	47°05′58″N 92°46′18″W
Bridge No. 69506	CR 133	Elmer Township	47°04′08″N 92°46′34″W
Bridge No. 69624	CR 29	Van Buren Township	46°59′47″N 92°48′30″W
Bridge No. 69505	CR 8 (E 5th Avenue)	Floodwood	46°55′44″N 92°54′15″W
Unnamed railroad bridge	BNSF	Brookston	46°52′30″N 92°38′09″W
Bridge No. 69580	CSAH 7 (2nd Avenue)	Brookston	46°52′11″N 92°36′12″W
Bridge No. 69121	US 2	Stoney Brook Township	46°50′58″N 92°34′35″W
Unnamed bridge	Recreation/pedestrian	Cloquet	46°43′40″N 92°28′02″W
Bridge No. 9517	Broadway Street	Cloquet	46°43′31″N 92°27′46″W
Bridge Nos. 9008 and 9009	MN 33	Cloquet	46°43′35″N 92°27′47″W
Unnamed railroad bridge	Cloquet Terminal Railroad	Cloquet	46°43′33″N 92°27′32″W
Knife Falls Dam	Pedestrian (private)	Cloquet	46°43′37″N 92°26′56″W
Sappi Dam	Pedestrian (private)	Cloquet	46°43′34″N 92°25′46″W
Unnamed dam	Pedestrian (private)	Scanlon	46°42′31″N 92°25′08″W
Bridge No. 9513	CR 61	Scanlon	46°42′15″N 92°25′03″W
I-35 Bridges	I-35	Scanlon and Esko	46°41′59″N 92°25′13″W
Thomson Dam	Pedestrian (private)	Carlton	46°39′59″N 92°24′26″W
Thompson Dam Bridge	MN 210	Carlton	46°39′53″N 92°24′16″W
Willard Munger State Trail bridge	Pedestrian/bicycle (former railroad)	Twin Lakes Township and Thomson	46°39′47″N 92°24′17″W
Jay Cooke State Park Swinging Bridge #5	Pedestrian	Jay Cooke State Park	46°39′13″N 92°22′14″W
Fond du Lac Dam	Pedestrian (private)	Twin Lakes Township and Duluth	46°39′57″N 92°17′49″W
Biauswah Bridge	MN 23	Duluth and Town of Superior, Wisconsin	46°39′32″N 92°17′01″W
Oliver Bridge	CN; MN 39; WIS 105	Duluth and Oliver, Wisconsin	46°39′24″N 92°12′07″W
Grassy Point Swing Bridge	BNSF	Duluth and Superior, Wisconsin	46°43′42″N 92°8′36″W
Richard I. Bong Memorial Bridge	US 2	Duluth and Superior, Wisconsin	46°43′53″N 92°8′38″W
John A. Blatnik Bridge	I-535 / US 53	Duluth and Superior, Wisconsin	46°44′57″N 92°6′5″W
Aerial Lift Bridge	S Lake Avenue	Duluth and Minnesota Point	46°46′45″N 92°5′34″W

== Wisconsin ==
Crossing	Carries	Location	Coordinates
Biauswah Bridge	MN 23	Duluth, Minnesota and Town of Superior	46°39′32″N 92°17′01″W
Oliver Bridge	CN, MN 39, and WI 105	Duluth, Minnesota and Oliver	46°39′24″N 92°12′07″W
Grassy Point Swing Bridge	BNSF	Duluth, Minnesota and Superior	46°43′42″N 92°8′36″W
Richard I. Bong Memorial Bridge	US 2	Duluth, Minnesota and Superior	46°43′53″N 92°8′38″W
John A. Blatnik Bridge	I-535 and US 53	Duluth, Minnesota and Superior	46°44′57″N 92°6′5″W
