= Toivola =

Toivola is a Finnish language proper name that occurs both as a surname and a place name. It may refer to:

== People ==
- Aleksanteri Toivola (1893–1987), Finnish wrestler
- Hilkka Toivola (1909–2002), Finnish artist
- Jani Toivola (born 1977), Finnish politician
- Jukka Toivola (1949–2011), Finnish long-distance runner
- Miikka Toivola (1949–2017), Finnish footballer

== Places ==
- Toivola, Michigan, an unincorporated community in Michigan
- Toivola, Minnesota, an unincorporated community in Minnesota
- Toivola Township, St. Louis County, Minnesota, a township in Minnesota
