= Pokegama =

Pokegama may refer to:

== Bodies of water in the United States ==
- Pokegama Bay, a bay in Wisconsin
- Pokegama Creek, a stream in Minnesota
- Pokegama Lake (Minnesota), two lakes in Minnesota
- Pokegama Lake, a lake in Minong (town), Wisconsin
- Pokegama Lake, a lake in Vilas County, Wisconsin
- Pokegama River, a river in Wisconsin

== Communities in the United States ==
- Pokegama, Minnesota
- Pokegama Township, Pine County, Minnesota
- Pokegama, Wisconsin

== Native American establishments ==
- Pokegama Lake Indian Reservation, a former reservation established for the Pokegama Lake Band of Mississippi Chippewa
- Pokegama Lake Band, a subtribe of the Mississippi River Band of Chippewa Indians
