= Richard I. Bong Memorial Bridge =

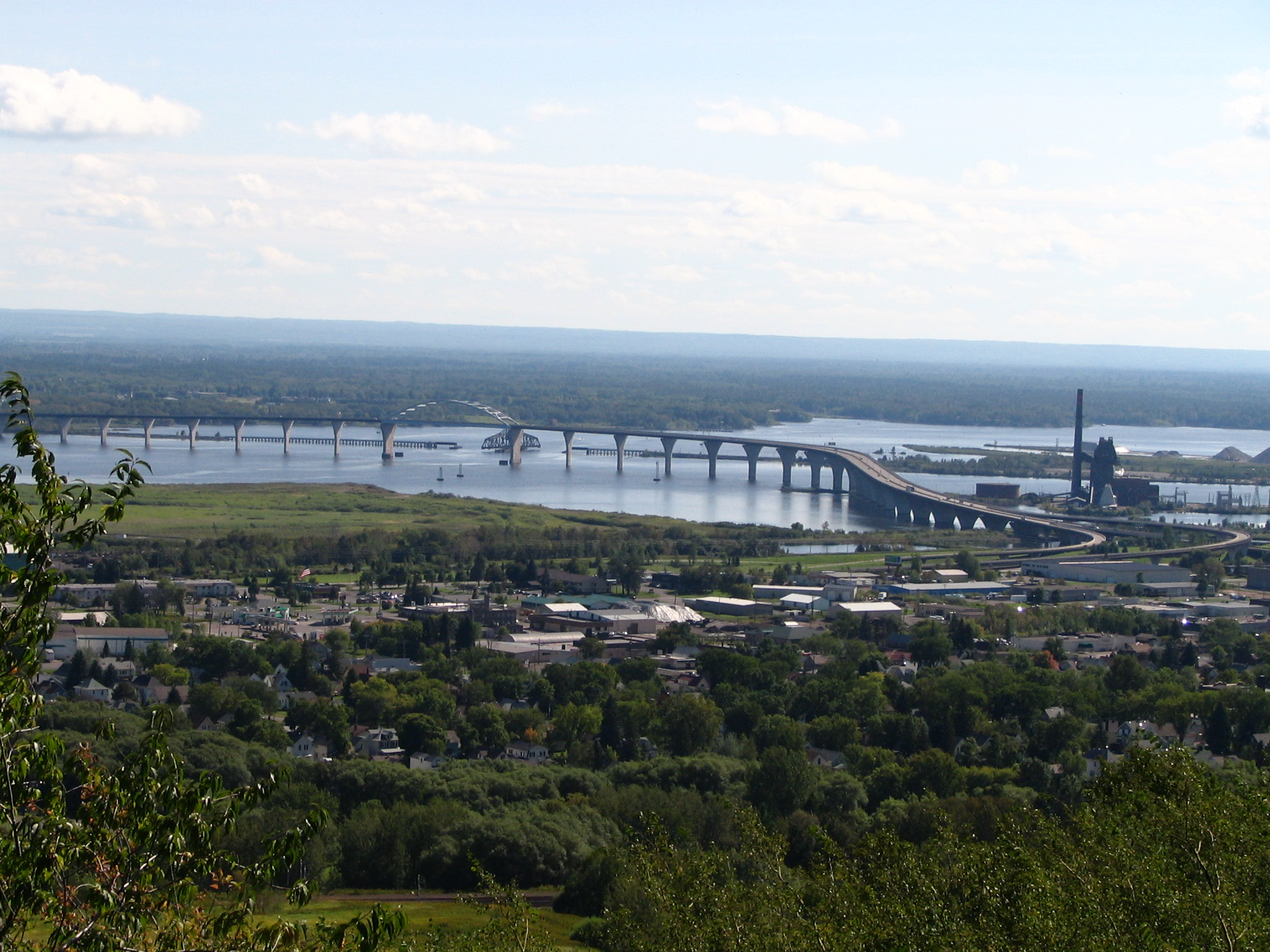
- Richard I. Bong Memorial Bridge from the Duluth, Minnesota hillside looking southwest toward Superior, Wisconsin and Billings Park
- Coordinates: 46.73142°N 92.14376°W
- Carries: Four lanes of US 2
- Crosses: Saint Louis Bay
- Locale: Duluth, MN and Superior, WI
- Named for: Richard Ira Bong
- Maintained by: Wisconsin Department of Transportation

Characteristics
- Design: Tied-arch bridge
- Total length: 11,800 ft (3,600 m)

History
- Designer: Amardo J. Romano
- Opened: October 25, 1984

Location
- Interactive map of Richard I. Bong Memorial Bridge

The Richard I. Bong Memorial Bridge, also known as the Bong Bridge, connects Duluth, Minnesota, and Superior, Wisconsin, via U.S. Highway 2 (US 2). Opened on October 25, 1984, it is roughly 11,800 feet (3,600 m) long, including about 8,300 feet (2,500 m) over water. It crosses the Saint Louis Bay, which drains into Lake Superior. The bridge rises 120 feet above the river to accommodate maritime traffic in a 400-foot-wide navigation channel.

The Bong Bridge is one of three road bridges connecting Duluth and Wisconsin points. Downstream is the through-arch John A. Blatnik Bridge that carries Interstate 535 (I-535); upstream is the Oliver Bridge between the Gary-New Duluth neighborhood and the Wisconsin village of Oliver.

== History ==
The bridge's namesake, Richard Ira Bong, was a pilot in the U.S. Army Air Corps during World War II who was named the United States' all-time "Ace of Aces". The designer of the bridge was fellow World War II veteran Amardo J. "Marty" Romano. The bridge was originally to be named Arrowhead Bridge, after the old wood trestle–bascule bridge it replaced.

Ground was broken in September 1979, with Minnesota Governor Al Quie and Wisconsin Governor Lee Dreyfus in attendance for the ceremony. The project faced funding delays and controversy over the sourcing of foreign steel for the build. The project took five years with the total bill reaching $70 million. The Bong Bridge officially opened on Oct. 25, 1984. The federal government picked up 80 per cent of the cost, with Minnesota and Wisconsin splitting the remaining share of the cost. A ceremony to officially dedicate the bridge in Richard Bong’s honor took place in July of 1985 with members of his family and former military unit in attendance.

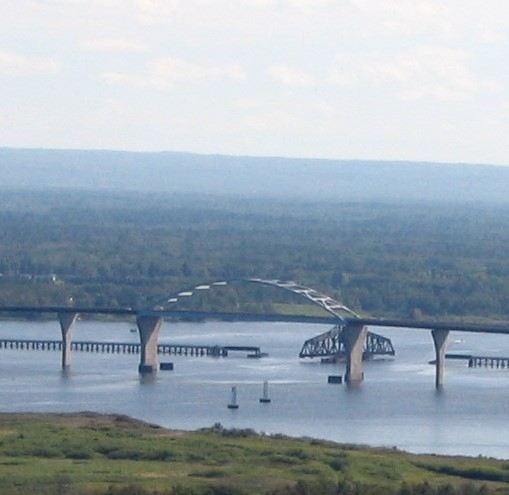
Tied arch spanning the main channel

The bridge was one of the largest public works projects undertaken by the state of Wisconsin. Ayres Associates, an architectural/engineering company based in Eau Claire, Wisconsin, managed the project and designed the 1.5-mile (2.4 km) length of approach bridges. The Wisconsin Department of Transportation designed the channel span (tied arch). Its central suspension section is made of Japanese steel.

In 2007, the Bong Bridge won a Wonders of Wisconsin Engineering Award from the American Council of Engineering Companies, Wisconsin Chapter, which was celebrating its 50th anniversary.

== Accident ==
The bridge was the scene of a 16-vehicle pile-up on January 27, 2005, in which 10 people were hospitalized and a baby was given an emergency delivery but subsequently died.
