= John Blatnik =

American politician (1911–1991)

John Anton Blatnik
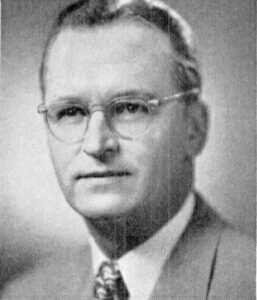
- circa 1950s

Member of the U.S. House of Representatives from Minnesota's 8th district
- In office January 3, 1947 – December 31, 1974
- Preceded by: William Pittenger
- Succeeded by: Jim Oberstar

Member of the Minnesota Senate
- In office 1940–1944

Personal details
- Born: August 17, 1911 Chisholm, Minnesota, U.S.
- Died: December 17, 1991 (aged 80) Forest Heights, Maryland, U.S.
- Party: Democratic-Farmer-Labor Party
- Spouse(s): Gisela Hager; Evelyn Castiglioni

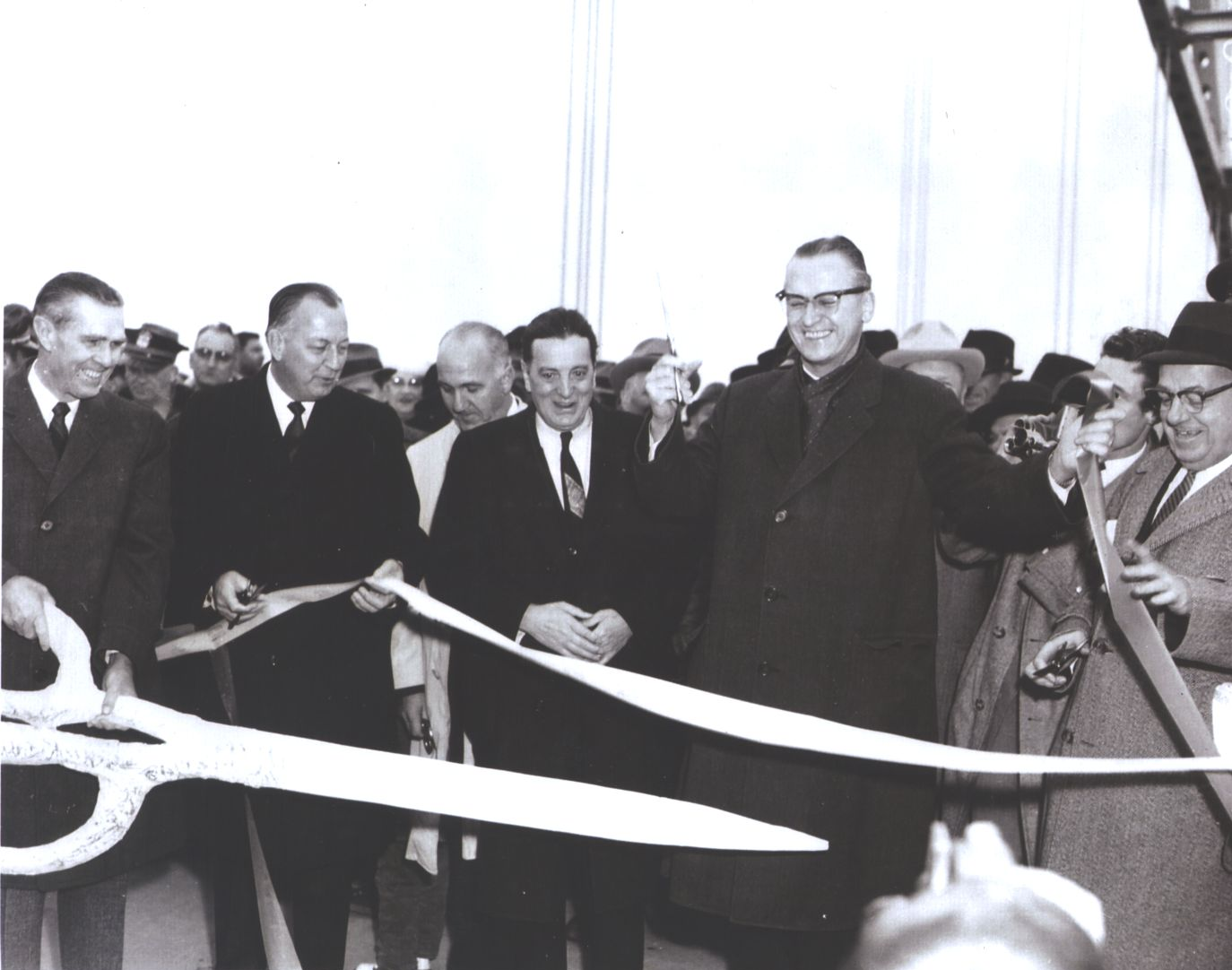
Blatnik at the ribbon cutting of the John A. Blatnik Bridge

John Anton Blatnik (August 17, 1911 – December 17, 1991) was a United States Congressman from Minnesota. He was a member of the Minnesota Democratic-Farmer-Labor Party (DFL), which is affiliated with the Democratic Party.

== Early life ==
Blatnik was born in Chisholm, Minnesota, to Slovene immigrant parents. He graduated from Winona State Teachers College (today Winona State University) and worked as a chemistry teacher in Chisholm.

== Career ==
From 1940 to 1944, he served in the Minnesota State Senate and volunteered to serve in the United States Army Air Corps in 1942. While in the Army Air Corps (the predecessor to the Air Force), he was chief of the Office of Strategic Services's mission with Tito's Yugoslav partisans for almost a year.

In 1946, Blatnik was elected to Congress representing Minnesota's 8th District in the northeastern part of the state, running on the newly unified ticket of the Minnesota Democratic-Farmer-Labor Party. In a Republican year, he defeated that party's four-term incumbent. He was reelected 13 times without much difficulty. He served in the 80th, 81st, 82nd, 83rd, 84th, 85th, 86th, 87th, 88th, 89th, 90th, 91st, 92nd, and 93rd congresses, (January 3, 1947 – December 31, 1974). In the 92nd Congress, Blatnik achieved the chair of the Public Works Committee, just as his health was beginning to fail. In August 1972 it was reported he had suffered two mild heart attacks in the last year.

In 1963, Blatnik, introduced a bill to make Leif Erikson Day a nationwide observance. The following year Congress adopted this unanimously.

Blatnik voted for the Civil Rights Act of 1964. He was an early supporter of the Saint Lawrence Seaway and helped develop the original legislation to build it. He served as chairman of the Public Works Committee (now known as the Transportation and Infrastructure Committee) during his last two terms in Congress. As chairman, he shepherded the Federal Water Pollution Control Act, better known as the Clean Water Act, to passage in 1972. His long-term battle for clean water joined his attention as a legislator to public works as a boost to the economy. He was among the first in Congress to focus on smoking as a health concern, though a smoker himself.

Upon retirement, Blatnik endorsed his long-time administrative assistant, Jim Oberstar, to replace him in Congress; Oberstar won easily in the 1974 election.

In 1980, Blatnik was among the American delegation that attended the state funeral of Josip Tito held in Belgrade.

== Personal life and death ==
Blatnik's first marriage to Sarah Elizabeth Arnold was relatively brief and produced a son, but was largely unknown. In 1955, he married the former Gisela Hager. They had three children. Blatnik died in Forest Heights, Maryland on December 17, 1991. He was survived by his third wife, the former Evelyn Castiglioni.

== Legacy ==
The bridge for Interstate 535 crossing the Superior Bay and the Saint Louis Bay between Wisconsin and Minnesota was renamed the John A. Blatnik Bridge in his honor on September 24, 1971.

== See also ==
- Minnesota's congressional delegations

U.S. House of Representatives
Preceded by William Pittenger	Member of the U.S. House of Representatives from Minnesota's 8th congressional district 1947–1974	Succeeded by Jim Oberstar
Political offices
Preceded by George Hyde Fallon; Maryland	Chairman of House Public Works Committee; 1971–1974	Succeeded by Robert E. Jones Jr. Alabama
