= Gary – New Duluth =

Neighborhood of Duluth, Minnesota

Coordinates: 46°40′13″N 92°13′33″W

Gary – New Duluth is a neighborhood in Duluth, Minnesota, United States. Although called Gary–New Duluth by most people in the area, and even identified by local traffic signs as such, the neighborhoods of Gary and New Duluth are two separate communities.

Commonwealth Avenue (State Highway 23), Becks Road (County Road 3), and Gary Street are three of the main routes in the community.

The neighborhood of Gary begins as one enters under the railroad bridge on Commonwealth Avenue. The neighborhood of New Duluth begins just past where an old railroad line once crossed Commonwealth Avenue and continues to the Boy Scout Landing at the very end of Commonwealth Avenue.

The major tenants of New Duluth are the Minneapolis Electric Company's steel foundry and Stowe Elementary School.

Both neighborhoods are historically linked to the once vast U.S. Steel plant of the Duluth Works which was once located outside of Gary and in between Morgan Park. Gary was named for Elbert Henry Gary, founding chairman of U.S. Steel, who was also the namesake of Gary, Indiana. Both neighborhoods experienced a major decline in business and population when the area's industries folded, although much of the ethnic heritage of the communities still thrives to this day.

Sargent Creek flows through at the western edge of the neighborhood. It serves as a boundary line between Gary–New Duluth and the Fond du Lac neighborhood.

The Oliver Bridge across the Saint Louis River and McCuen Street (MN 39) together connect the neighborhood of Gary–New Duluth with the nearby village of Oliver, Wisconsin.

== Adjacent neighborhoods ==
(Directions following those of Duluth's general street grid system, not actual geographical coordinates)

- Smithville (north)
- Morgan Park (north)
- Fond du Lac (west)
- Midway Township (north, west)
- Village of Oliver, Wisc. (east)

== External links and references ==
- City of Duluth website
- City map of neighborhoods (PDF)
