= Morgan Park, Duluth, Minnesota =

Neighborhood in Duluth, Minnesota, USA

Morgan Park
- Neighborhood
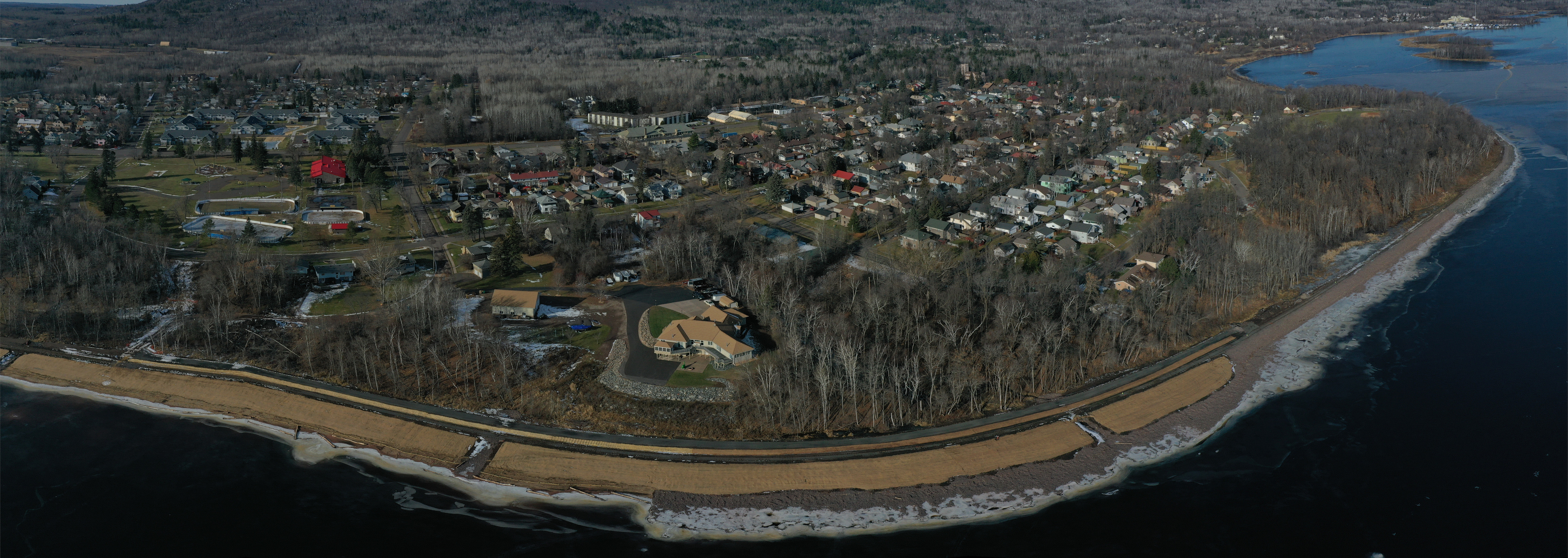
- Morgan Park in 2022
- Interactive map of Morgan Park
- Coordinates: 46°41′18″N 92°12′37″W
- Country: United States
- State: Minnesota
- County: St. Louis
- City: Duluth
- Established: 1913
- Time zone: UTC-6 (CST)
  - Summer (DST): UTC-5 (CDT)

Morgan Park is a neighborhood in Duluth, Minnesota, United States. The site of a coking and mill operation that closed in 1981, it was closed to the public for decades after being placed on the Superfund list by the Environmental Protection Agency.

Arbor Street/88th Avenue West serves as a main route in the community. Grand Avenue is nearby. The area was first developed for worker housing to support the U.S. Steel plant known as the Duluth Works. It was developed along the Saint Louis River.

== Background ==
The Morgan Park neighborhood is also known as a planned community built by U.S. Steel to serve its Duluth Works steel plant in the early 1900s. Originally named "Model City" during its designing phase in 1913 and renamed in honor of U.S. Steel's founder J. P. Morgan in June 1914, the town of Morgan Park was built and run by the U.S. Steel Corporation until 1933, when it was all deeded to the City of Duluth.

The community thrived with recreational facilities, community clubs, the Lake View Store, billed as America's first indoor mall, a K-12 school, and its own police and fire department. Eventually, the steel plant declined and was shut down in phases, the last facilities closing in 1981. The historic nature of the community is still present.

== History ==
At the time of its completion, Morgan Park stood as one of the crowning achievements of company town conception. Connected to the city of Duluth by an East and West road link, the town was somewhat isolated from the rest of the city, and until the 1930s, only employees of the U.S. Steel Corporation and its subsidiaries could live there. After the properties had been transferred to the city, residential housing was opened to any qualified candidate.

Minnesota Steel Company operated the steel plant. The town proprietor, known as the Morgan Park Company, was set up as its direct subsidiary. The Morgan Park Company served as a kind of private community government, responsible for trash pickup, lawn and house care, police and fire protection, health care (until the hospital closed in the 1920s), and snow removal. Residents of the town were expected to keep their homes up in a generally conservative suburban manner. If they failed to do so, the Morgan Park Company would do the work and deduct the costs from the employee's paycheck.

=== Duluth Works ===
At the start of the 20th century, an industrial empire was developing and expanding along the Great Lakes, based on the great natural resources that supported iron and steel manufacturing. During the early 1900s, the Minnesota Legislature gave thought of imposing a hefty ore tax on every ton of ore that was shipped from the vast deposits on the Iron Range. No other company would be hurt more by this than the newly incorporated U.S. Steel. To persuade the legislature to give up the ore tax, US Steel agreed to build a manufacturing complex in Duluth, and produce some finished materials and products within the state that supplied the most iron ore to the company. US Steel carried coal and other raw materials in their ships up the Great Lakes to Duluth in their otherwise empty cargo holds; they filled the freighters with iron ore to return to the mills on the lower lakes, especially in Illinois and Ohio. Many speculators thought that Duluth would become a massive manufacturing center, second only to Pittsburgh or Chicago, but these ambitions never came close to being realized.

The Minnesota Steel Company, which was incorporated by U.S. Steel in 1907, was the subsidiary operating unit of U.S. Steel in Duluth. The steel plant was under construction in 1908 and poured its first ingot of steel on December 11, 1916. It was the largest integrated steel works west of Chicago until Geneva Steel was constructed in 1943. Minnesota Steel Company was the largest employer in the city of Duluth from its inception to its closing, to include the steel and cement plants, and was the fourth-largest industrial manufacturing facility in the State of Minnesota. Minnesota Steel was the holding company for the steel plant (and for Morgan Park itself) until it was leased to the American Steel and Wire Division (AS&W) of U.S. Steel in June 1932. This was part of a restructuring effort by the parent company to deal with the Great Depression and associated market problems.

AS&W would remain the plant's main operating parent under the U.S. Steel imperial umbrella until 1964, when more restructuring move by U.S. Steel placed several of its smaller operations under one division. (At this point forward, the steel plant was known simply within the Corporation and the market as USS Duluth Works.)

The Duluth Works was primarily a wire product manufacturer, taking raw materials such as iron ore and coke, and converting them into iron and, later, steel for the production of blooms, bars, billets and rods. The Duluth Works shipped many of its semi-finished products to other U.S. Steel mills for finishing. The merchant and wire mills used its own steel to furnish various types of nails, wire, barbed wire, fencing and fence posts, highway mesh, and sign posts and other various products. As an act of pride, the Duluth Works nail department left out the fourth barb, used in holding the wire and then striking the top of it to make a head, leaving an obvious omission on the side of the nail to signify that this nail was made in Duluth. It was used in promotions in the Twin Ports area to entice consumers to "Look for the missing fourth barb" on the nail to see if it was made at Duluth Works.

In the late 1930s until its closing, Duluth Works fence posts, steel wool and barbed wire, were produced within the U.S. Steel empire only at the Duluth Works. The wire mesh product, created in 1954, and the US Steel's Universal Atlas Cement plant were instrumental to building the ICBM missile silos of the Midwest for the Strategic Air Command of the United States Air Force.

==== Closing and fate ====
Duluth Works was caught up in industrial restructuring during the early 1970s to the mid-1980s, as was other heavy industry in the Midwest. The story was the same as at other plants all over the country; Youngstown. Homestead. Duquesne. Fairless. McKeesport. Many plants that were once powerhouses within U.S. Steel and the industry as a whole, were demolished by cutting torches. The dumping of artificially low-priced foreign steel in the United States was partly to blame, but the Duluth Works and many other plants had not been modernized with the Basic Oxygen Furnaces (BOF) to replace its outdated open hearth technology. This had been introduced when the plant was first built. Duluth Works was located in a market where other plants could meet its own output and demand.

The Duluth Works, despite being an integrated steel maker, used only 20% of its own steel for products that it made for its own market area, an area that was sparsely populated and small in demand. The rest of its semi-finished steel material was sent to Joliet Works, Chicago, and Gary. In the 1960s and 1970s, there were rising demands for industry to clean up its effect on the environment. In June 1970 the Minnesota Pollution Control Agency gave U.S. Steel three years to conduct a study of its harmful emissions at the Duluth Works and a two-year follow-up window to implement corrective actions. Instead, U.S. Steel decided in September 1971 to close the "hot side" of the Duluth Works. It ended all iron and steel-making productions of the blast furnaces, pig iron casters and open hearths would cease. 1,600 steel workers were out of their jobs.

The cold side operations were to continue, using steel brought in from Gary or other U.S Steel plants, to make rod and wire products. In October 1973, the company also shut down the cold side, leaving only the coke plant, the cement plant and several other smaller operations going in Morgan Park. The cement plant (operated by Universal Atlas Cement Company - another subsidiary of U.S. Steel) closed in 1976, leaving only the coke plant still operating. Only 200 employees remained as residents of Morgan Park. Finally in 1979, the MPCA clamped down on the emissions of the coke plant as well, and in 1981 US Steel closed the coke plant and ended its association with Duluth.

The government held U.S. Steel to its responsibilities as a land tenant. The land occupied by the former plant and the surrounding area was so polluted after almost 70 years of heavy industry that the Pollution Control Agency placed the site on the Environmental Protection Agency's Superfund list in 1984, requiring a plan and actions for hazard containment and environmental remediation. That year, buildings were inspected and harmful materials removed. In 1988, US Steel contracted for the razing and demolition of the once massive complex; the last of the buildings was brought down in 1997. Today the land of the former steel and cement plants sit primarily vacant, a brownfield available for development. The cement plant has been deemed as "cleaned" by U.S. Steel and the city of Duluth. The former steel plant site still has areas affected with pollution, which are areas of concern for area residents and prospective new tenants of the property. The MPCA, EPA and U.S. Steel continue to monitor and treat the 640-acre (2.6 km^{2}) site and surrounding areas.

The Duluth company Ikonics Corporation, in April 2008, has expressed intent to build a warehouse facility on the former cement plant site. With the City of Duluth's Duluth Economic and Development Authority, or DEDA, it has begun land preparation to use up to 40 acres (160,000 m^{2}) of the former industrial plant. After almost 30 years, some activity will return to Morgan Parks industrial plain.

== Adjacent neighborhoods ==
(Directions following those of Duluth's general street grid system, not actual geographical coordinates)

- Smithville (west, north)
- Gary – New Duluth (south)

== See also ==
- Duluth Works
- U.S. Steel – United States Steel Corporation
- Company towns
- Gary, Indiana
- Grand Avenue – State Highway 23 (MN 23)
