= Elmer, Minnesota =

Elmer
- Unincorporated community
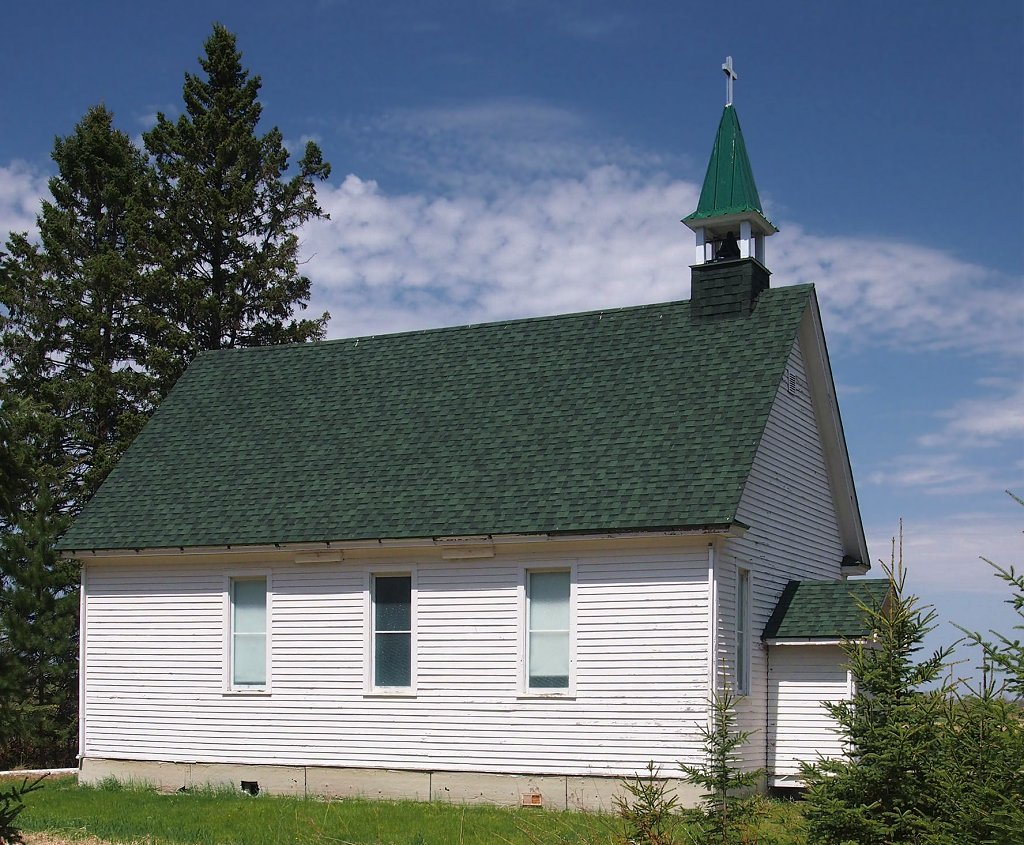
- The 1913 Church of St. Joseph in Elmer

- Location within Minnesota Location within the United States
- Coordinates: 47°06′13″N 92°46′38″W
- Country: United States
- State: Minnesota
- County: Saint Louis
- Township: Elmer Township
- Elevation: 1,280 ft (390 m)

Population
  - Total: 10
- Time zone: UTC-6 (Central (CST))
  - Summer (DST): UTC-5 (CDT)
- ZIP code: 55765
- Area code: 218
- GNIS feature ID: 661204

Elmer is an unincorporated community in Elmer Township, Saint Louis County, Minnesota, United States. The community is located near Meadowlands at the intersection of County Road 199 (Elmer Road) and County Road 193 (Bailey Road).

Saint Louis County Highway 5, County Highway 133, and Meadowlands Trunk Road are all in the vicinity. The Saint Louis River is nearby.
