= Duluth Works =

Coordinates: 46°41′13″N 92°12′25″W

The Duluth Works was an industrial steel and cement manufacturing complex located in Duluth, Minnesota, United States, in operation from 1916 to 1981. The complex was operated by U.S. Steel. Officially, the plant's purpose was to supply the growing Midwest with steel finished products. Unofficially, they were built as part of a "gentleman's agreement" between U.S. Steel and the State of Minnesota to not impose hefty iron ore taxes on U.S. Steel in exchange for a fully integrated steel plant within Minnesota, whose mines furnished 80% of the ore to U.S. Steel. The combined works of the steel and cement plant were the largest employers in Duluth and the fourth largest industrial complex in Minnesota.

== Minnesota Steel Company ==
In 1907, U.S. Steel agreed to build an integrated steel plant in the vicinity of Duluth, which was 70 miles (110 km) from the largest iron ore source in the United States, the Iron Range. U.S. Steel theorized that by using the Great Lakes, it could haul limestone and coal to Duluth from the lower lakes and return with a load of iron ore from Minnesota. It was thought that by using this process, Duluth would become a great center of manufacturing in the United States.

In June 1907, U.S. Steel incorporated the Minnesota Steel Company, a wholly owned subsidiary, to manage and care for all plans of the future developments of the steel plant. This included building houses for its new employees. The houses were built adjacent U.S. Steel's new plant and the community eventually became known as Morgan Park, named for J.P. Morgan, chairman of the board of U.S. Steel. This innovative planned company town was only open to employees of the Minnesota Steel Company and the companies that followed.

Although a subsidiary of U.S. Steel, which at the time was headquartered in New York City, the Minnesota Steel Company's general offices were located in Morgan Park in a building adjacent to the gate of the plant. The officers of the Minnesota Steel Company all held positions within the U.S. Steel Corporation, much as did Minnesota Steel's sister companies of Carnegie-Illinois Steel and the Tennessee Coal, Iron and Railroad Company.

== Steel for the west ==
The Duluth Works primary purpose was to make steel for the expanding Midwest prairies and far west plains. It was originally intended to build rails for the expanding railroads, but by the time the mill was completed in 1915, the railroads had reached their peak of construction and it was felt that those needs could best be handled from the Chicago area. After the rail mill was completed, it was converted into billet finishing facilities. In 1922, after going over what products would best serve the plant's existence, U.S. Steel decided to expand its Morgan Park operation and build a new wire, rod, nail, and fence post fabrication facility. These products, it was felt, best suited Duluth's capabilities for integrated steel production. After the expansion of these facilities, the Duluth Works only consumed 20% of its own steel production for its finished products. The rest of its semi-finished steel was shipped to other facilities for finishing. Its proposed 12-state market area and areas of Canada were sparsely populated and able to be supplied with products from other mills. Some of Minnesota Steel's products were only produced by U.S. Steel at the Duluth Works facility. These included steel wool, certain nails, fences and fence posts, and a new product introduced in 1954, welded wire fabric, primarily for use with concrete to produce more sturdy road construction. Some of this material was used to in construction of missile silos for the Air Force's Strategic Air Command.

== Facilities ==
The Duluth Works steel facilities were, upon construction in 1915, briefly among the most modern steelworks in the world. Although massive in scale to many people, the plant was among more modest facilities within the U.S. Steel empire. At a steelmaking capacity of 973,000 tons per year, it was nowhere near the massive steel plants of Homestead or Gary. U.S. Steel bought more land when it built the facilities with the ultimately futile belief that more subsidiaries and other steel-related industries would move to the unoccupied site to consume the plant's products. The only other major tenant on the site was the cement plant of the Universal Atlas Cement Company, a subsidiary of U.S. Steel. A smaller company, Priola and Johnson, took open hearth and blast furnace slag and granulated it for other uses on the plant property.

The Duluth Works featured a ten-furnace open hearth steel production facility, two blast furnaces, 110 oven byproduct coke plant, a benzole and toluol plant, a byproducts refinery, coal and coke conveyors and crushing and sizing towers, a pig iron casting facility, a blowing house powerhouse, a Heine boiler house, fresh water pumping inlet station, a hot gas-soaking pit and stripping building, a massive rolling facility consisting of a blooming mill, 28" rolling mill, billet finishing department, hot gas re-heating beds, bar finishing department, fence post fabrication unit, merchant mill, wire, nail, fence and welded fabric mesh building, machine repair shop, three massive materials yard crane bridges and loading/unloading docks, locomotive engine repair and servicing building, its own railyard, a lab, an ore thawhouse, a coal thawhouse and various warehouses and other structures. When initially completed in 1916, the steel plant site had 48 buildings.

== Operations ==
The Duluth Works was an integrated steel plant which took several raw materials and combined them in furnaces to make a product. Of those raw materials, iron ore, which was mined 70 miles (110 km) away from the Duluth Works on the Iron Range, was in plentiful and nearby supply, but coal, limestone and other materials were also needed to make steel. These materials had to travel vast distances to get to Duluth, which made Duluth "undesirable" as a manufacturing metropolis in the eyes of many industry leaders. In the U.S. Steel empire, these materials and their transportation were all handled within branches of the U.S. Steel subsidiaries, all of them mentioned below, having had headquarters in Duluth. Iron ore was mined by U.S. Steel's Oliver Mining Company and hauled by rail on the Duluth, Missabe and Iron Range Railway (DM&IR) directly to the Duluth Works. Coal, which was mined on the East coast, was hauled by rail to Great Lakes ports and to Duluth by lake carriers of U.S. Steel's Pittsburgh Steamship Company. The limestone from Michigan, needed to purify iron ore in blast furnaces and used for cement making, was hauled by lake carrier to Duluth by the Bradley Transportation Company.

Scrap material and other bulk freight was moved at the Duluth Works by several rail carriers other than the Duluth, Missabe and Iron Range Railway. The most notable were the Soo Line, the Northern Pacific Railroad, the Duluth, Winnipeg and Pacific Railway, the Great Northern Railway, the Milwaukee Road and the Canadian National Railway. Minnesota Steel, American Steel and Wire, DM&IR and U.S. Steel all had locomotives within the plant for moving its material, and several were serviced and repaired in-house in locomotive machine and repair shops.

The steel and cement plants of the Duluth Works were both serviced by rail via a long rail trunk that intersected several other major rail lines in the area. The rail yard was known as the Steelton Yard and exists today in the same location between the former steel mill materials yard and the Duluth neighborhoods of Gary and New Duluth. This yard, once owned and operated by the DM&IR, is now operated by the Canadian National Railway.

Finished and semi-finished products from the Duluth steel works were taken by rail through the Steelton Yard over the Oliver Bridge through the south end of Superior, Wisconsin and brought to loading docks at Allouez Bay just south of the Superior entry for loading by ship to other markets or further finishing.

== End of a company, start of another ==
Following World War I and the 1920s, when Minnesota Steel enjoyed great success and profit, the Great Depression hit the country. The Duluth Works was affected just as much as the rest of the country. The blast furnaces, coke ovens and open hearths were idled at times, leaving only the finishing mills operating. In 1935, one of two blast furnaces was dismantled. The benzole plant closed in 1939. U.S. Steel realized that it had to reorganize some of its less profitable divisions to try to maintain its profit within the industry. With the newfound focus of the Duluth Works on wire products, in 1932 it was decided to move the Minnesota Steel Company's holdings under the umbrella of the American Steel and Wire company (AS & W), another division within the vast U.S. Steel empire. The Minnesota Steel Company now existed only on paper. For the next 24 years, the American Steel and Wire Company ran the operations at the Morgan Park plant. In 1964, the American Steel and Wire division was absorbed once again into the U.S. Steel umbrella under its Operations Division. The Morgan Park operations were known thereafter simply as "the Duluth Works".

== Beginning of the end ==
The late 1960s brought many issues affecting the Duluth Works. U.S. Steel had not heavily invested in modern improvements at the plant. This included basic oxygen furnace (BOF) technology that was already being installed at other U.S. Steel plants to replace the outdated open hearth furnace technology. Foreign steel producers were selling massive amounts of steel to U.S. customers at a far lower price than domestic steel producers could match, a process known in the industry as "dumping". The plant also was a major source of pollution, another key issue brought to light in the late 1960s. The main problem was still the lack of a regional market big enough to justify U.S. Steel making multimillion-dollar improvements to a facility that was never really needed.

== Closure ==
In June 1970, the Minnesota Pollution Control Agency (MPCA) asked U.S. Steel to provide documentation on pollution output at its Duluth facilities and a two-year window to implement a follow-up plan. In the fall of 1971, the United Steelworkers of America threatened to strike. Rather than deal with the issue of spending millions of dollars to improve the Duluth Works, U.S. Steel announced in September 1971 that it would shut down the "hot side" of operations, including the blast and open hearth furnaces and the pig iron shop, which affected 1,600 steelworkers. In January 1972, U.S. Steel's chairman of the board, Edwin H. Gott, announced that the hot side of the Duluth Works would not reopen, but that operations would still continue at its steel finishing, coke and cement facilities. In October 1973, U.S. Steel announced it was closing the "cold side", or finishing mills, leaving another 800 employees out of work. (Several smaller companies would make the former "cold side" facilities their home following the closures, such as Hallett Wire, Priola and Johnson, the Duluth Missabe and Iron Range Railway and Zalk Josephs, making steel related products. When Hallett Wire, the last remaining manufacturing tenant, left the Duluth Works Industrial Park in 1987, only the Realty and Development Division of U.S. Steel and some operations of the DM&IR railroad were left.) In 1976, the Universal Atlas Cement Company, a subsidiary of U.S. Steel at the Duluth Works operating since 1916, announced it would close, despite previous assurances to the contrary. Another 200 employees would lose their jobs. In 1979, U.S. Steel announced it was closing its coke plant, the last of its operating operations at the Duluth Works. By 1981, the last vestige of U.S. Steel's steelmaking operations in Duluth, once the city's largest employer, had come to an end.

== Redevelopment ==
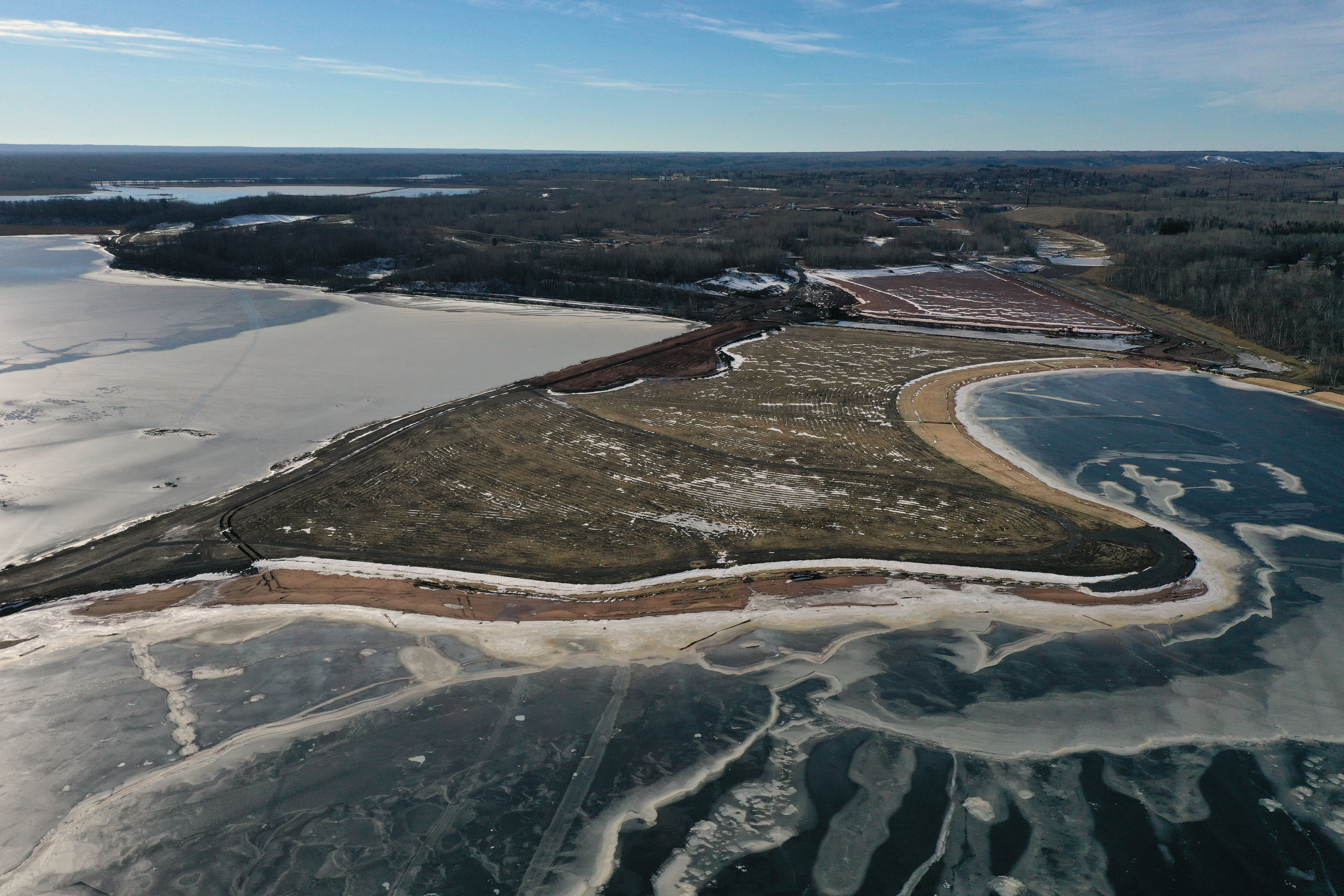
The former site of the Duluth Works in 2022

In 1975, beginning with the open hearth building, U.S. Steel began to demolish many of the massive structures that dotted the 1,600-acre (6.5 km^{2}) site and began preparing the industrial park for future development. The City of Duluth purchased the 65-acre (260,000 m^{2}) cement plant site for development through the Duluth Economic and Development Authority (DEDA). In April 2008, the Duluth-based photographic enhancement company, Ikonics, announced it would develop 40 acres (160,000 m^{2}) on the property to build a warehouse and move its West Duluth headquarters operations to Morgan Park at the former Atlas Cement site. On February 5, 2009, the State of Minnesota awarded the Duluth Port Authority a $50,000 investigative grant to determine the feasibility of redeveloping 123 acres (0.50 km^{2}) of the former steel plant site as a 35,000-square-foot (3,300 m^{2}) warehouse and light industrial park for storage of energy creating windmills.

== Cleanup ==
In 1984, following an inspection by the Pollution Control Agency, the former Duluth Works steel plant site was put on the National Priorities List for the federally funded "Superfund" program. Areas of heavy pollution were found on the site and were required to be cleaned up by U.S. Steel. Under the Great Lakes Legacy Act, it was agreed that the United States Environmental Protection Agency would pay 49% of the $165 million cleanup cost and U.S. Steel 51%. By 2023, the cleanup was nearly completed.
