= John A. Blatnik Bridge =

Highway bridge connecting Duluth, MN and Superior, WI

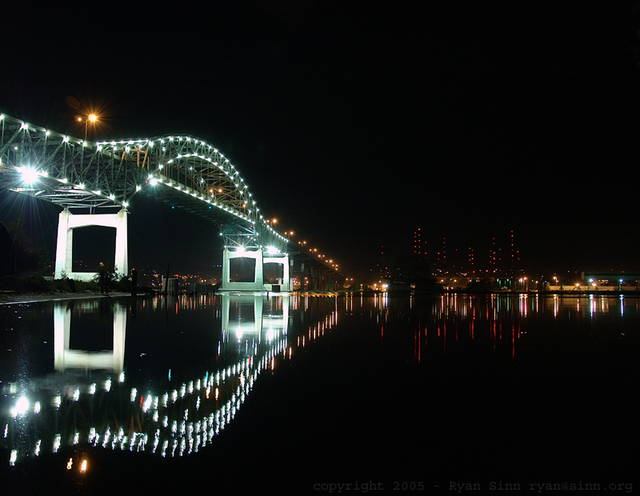
- Looking towards Duluth, Minnesota from Superior, Wisconsin near the Blatnik Bridge at night
- Coordinates: 46.749133°N 92.101286°W
- Carries: 4 lanes of I-535 / US 53
- Crosses: Saint Louis Bay
- Locale: Duluth, MN, and Superior, WI
- Maintained by: Minnesota Department of Transportation
- ID number: 9030

Characteristics
- Design: Through-arch
- Total length: 7,975 feet (2,431 m)
- Longest span: 600 feet (180 m)

History
- Opened: 1961

Location
- Interactive map of John A. Blatnik Bridge

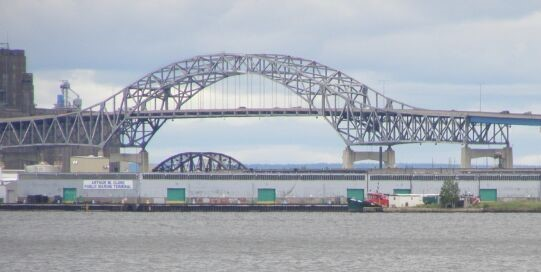
Central arch of the Blatnik Bridge

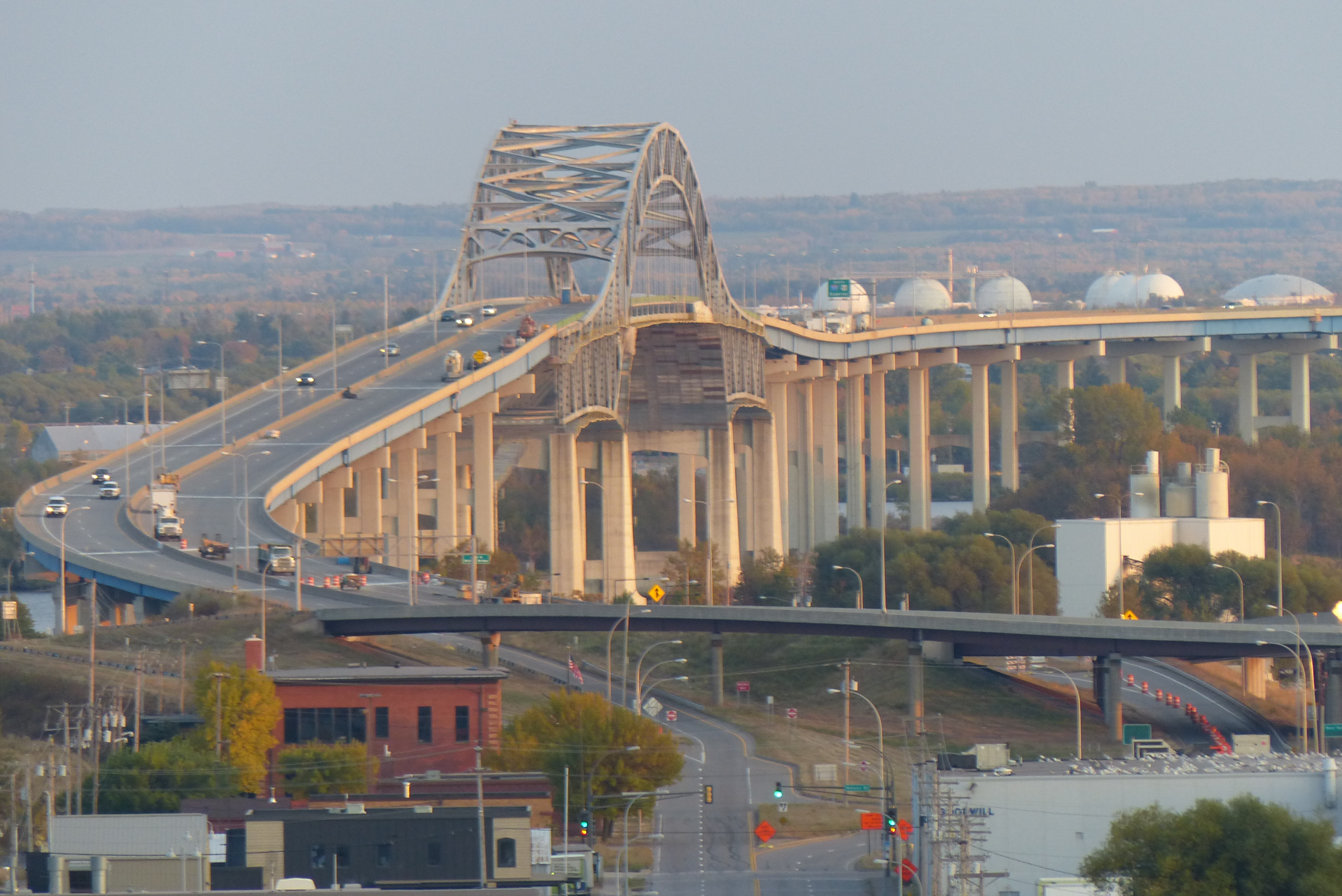
Blatnik Bridge, looking towards Superior

The John A. Blatnik Bridge is the bridge that carries Interstate 535 (I-535) and U.S. Highway 53 (US 53) over the Saint Louis River, a tributary of Lake Superior, between Duluth, Minnesota, and Superior, Wisconsin. The bridge is 7,975 feet (2,431 m) long and rises up nearly 120 feet (37 m) above the water to accommodate the seaway shipping channel. It was dedicated on December 2, 1961, but was renamed for Congressman John Blatnik on September 24, 1971, to commemorate Blatnik's role in making the bridge a reality. The Blatnik Bridge replaced a swinging toll bridge around the same location that carried both automobile and rail traffic.

The bridge was widened and the substructure was strengthened between 1992 and 1993 to accommodate hard shoulders. The Blatnik Bridge was reduced to two lanes temporarily in 2008, after it was discovered in a bridge inspection that the 1990s upgrades to the Blatnik Bridge had added weight beyond the load limit for gusset plates in eight different locations. This was similar to the gusset plates that caused the I-35W Bridge in Minneapolis to collapse on August 1, 2007. The Blatnik Bridge was reduced to two lanes temporarily until the gusset plates could be strengthened.

In November 2011, both the Minnesota and Wisconsin departments of transportation installed signs to remind drivers that trucks over 40 short tons (36 t) gross vehicle weight cannot use the Blatnik Bridge; these vehicles were rerouted to the nearby Bong Bridge. According to the press release, permitted, overweight vehicles have been restricted from using the Blatnik Bridge since early 2008 when inspections showed that corrosion and time were starting to affect the structure. Transportation officials say that the bridge is aging and restriction of overweight vehicles will help to extend the life of the bridge. Drivers who disregard the posted weight limits will be ticketed.

Almost 34,000 vehicles crossed the structure daily in 2017. Further deterioration of the bridge resulted in yearly inspections, rather than every two years by 2021. Major repair work was required every four years to keep the bridge open. President Joe Biden visited the bridge in 2022 as part of a tour to boost the infrastructure bill signed the previous year. The cost to replace the bridge is roughly estimated to cost $1.815 billion with construction beginning as soon as 2026. Construction would last 5–7 years. The bridge currently empties to Hammond Ave in Superior but proposals for replacement would connect the bridge directly to US 53. The Blatnik Bridge would be completely closed during construction as the existing bridge will be demolished prior to construction of the replacement.

The Blatnik Bridge is one of three bridges connecting Duluth and Superior, the second being the Richard I. Bong Memorial Bridge, a tied-arch bridge upriver from the Blatnik Bridge. The Bong Bridge carries U.S. Highway 2 (US 2) over the St. Louis Bay. The third is the Oliver Bridge connecting the Gary – New Duluth neighborhood in Duluth, Minnesota with the village of Oliver, Wisconsin. The bridge is 1,889-foot (576 m) long and is principally of steel truss construction. The upper deck carries a single track rail line and a lower deck carries the road connecting Wisconsin Highway 105 to Minnesota State Highway 39.

President Joe Biden cited the bridge several times during his visit to Superior in March 2022 to tout his infrastructure plan, describing it as a "critical benefit" of the infrastructure law. On January 22, 2024, the United States Department of Transportation announced that it was awarding nearly $1.06 billion in federal funds under the Infrastructure Investment and Jobs Act to replace the bridge.

== Accidents ==
On July 22, 2022, a 55-year-old man died after striking construction equipment on the Duluth-bound section of the bridge with his SUV at around 7:50 PM.

On January 9, 2017, Duluth native Mark Anderson lost control of his Ford Ranger and plunged over the side of the eastbound approach to the main span, falling 30–40 feet to the Port Terminal below. Anderson was injured but survived, and praised his Ranger, saying, "...look how they hold up."
