= Minnesota State Highway 39 =

Highway in Minnesota

Trunk Highway 39
- MN 39 highlighted in red

Route information
- Maintained by MnDOT
- Length: 1.080 mi (1.738 km)
- Existed: April 12, 1943–present

Major junctions
- West end: MN 23 at Duluth
- East end: WIS 105 at the Saint Louis River, the Minnesota — Wisconsin state line

Location
- Country: United States
- State: Minnesota
- Counties: St. Louis

Highway system
- Minnesota Trunk Highway System; Interstate; US; State; Legislative; Scenic
| ← MN 38 | → MN 40 |

Minnesota State Highway 39 (MN 39) is a short 1.080-mile-long (1.738 km) highway in northeast Minnesota, which runs from its intersection with State Highway 23 (Commonwealth Avenue) in Duluth and continues east to its eastern terminus at the Wisconsin state line (at the Oliver Bridge), where it becomes Wisconsin Highway 105 upon entering the village of Oliver, Wisconsin.

The east end of Highway 39 crosses the Saint Louis River to Wisconsin, over the double-deck Oliver Bridge with a railroad track on the upper deck.

Highway 39 is also known as McCuen Street in the Gary–New Duluth neighborhood of Duluth.

== Route description ==
State Highway 39 serves as a short route between Duluth and the village of Oliver, Wisconsin.

Highway 39, together with Wisconsin Highway 105, are part of a 6-mile (9.7 km) east–west connector between the city of Superior, WI, Oliver, and the Gary–New Duluth neighborhood of Duluth.

The route is legally defined as Legislative Route 213 in the Minnesota Statutes. It is not marked with this number.

== History ==
Highway 39 was authorized on April 12, 1943.

From 1958 to 1973, Highway 39 had continued farther west, extending over present-day State Highway 210 through Jay Cooke State Park to then-U.S. Highway 61 (now State Highway 45) at Carlton.

The road deck on the Highway 39 / Highway 105 Oliver Bridge was originally a wooden deck. Modernization came in the year 2000 when both states' DOT (WisDOT and MnDOT) cooperated with the Duluth, Missabe and Iron Range Railway to jointly fund a reconstruction of the roadway surface, which now features a stronger steel and reinforced concrete deck.

== Major intersections ==
The entire route is in St. Louis County.

| Location | mi | km | Destinations | Notes |
|---|---|---|---|---|
| Duluth | 0.000 | 0.000 | MN 23 | Western terminus |
| Saint Louis River | 0.901 | 1.450 | Oliver Bridge; Minnesota–Wisconsin state line | |
| Oliver | 1.080 | 1.738 | WIS 105 east | Eastern terminus |
1.000 mi = 1.609 km; 1.000 km = 0.621 mi
