= Elmer Township, St. Louis County, Minnesota =

Elmer Township, Minnesota
- Township
- Welcome to Elmer Township sign

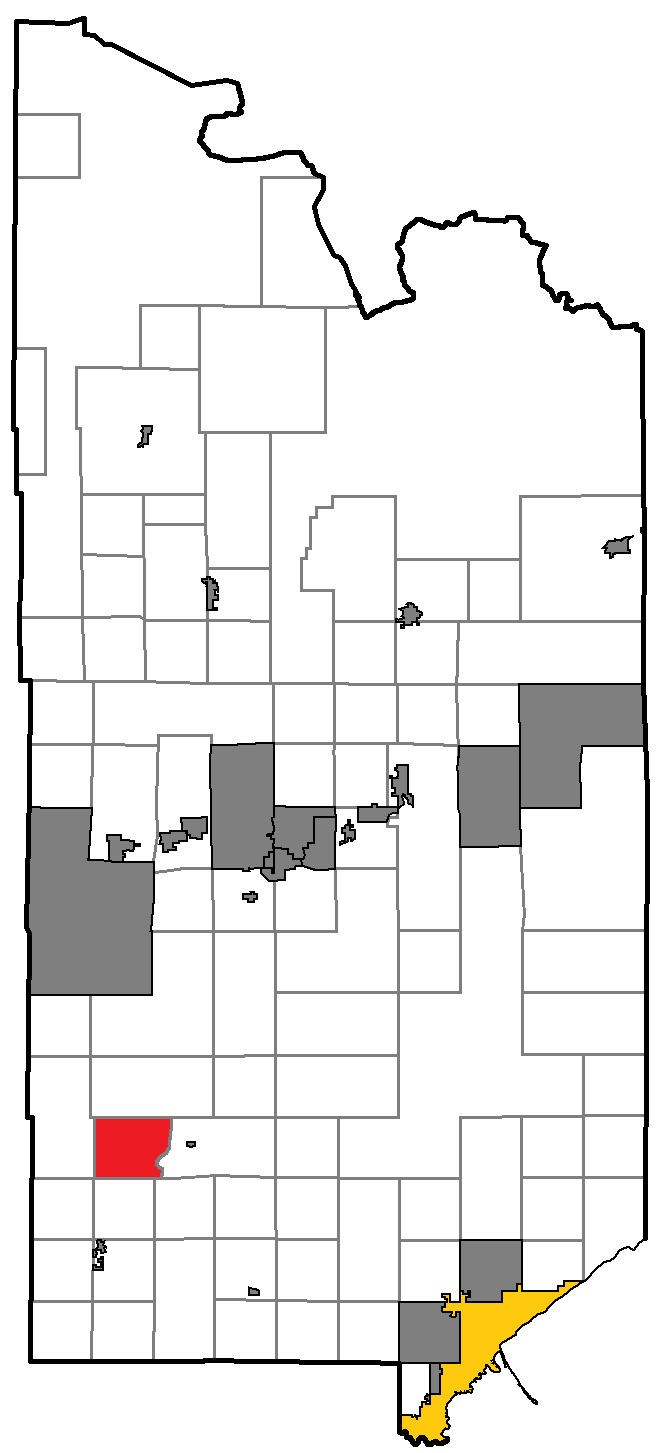
- Location of Elmer Township within St. Louis County, Minnesota
- Coordinates: 47°4′35″N 92°49′0″W
- Country: United States
- State: Minnesota
- County: Saint Louis

Area
  - Total: 40.7 sq mi (105.4 km^{2})
  - Land: 40.6 sq mi (105.1 km^{2})
  - Water: 0.12 sq mi (0.3 km^{2})
- Elevation: 1,280 ft (390 m)

Population (2020)
  - Total: 132
  - Density: 3.25/sq mi (1.26/km^{2})
- Time zone: UTC-6 (Central (CST))
  - Summer (DST): UTC-5 (CDT)
- FIPS code: 27-18944
- GNIS feature ID: 0664083

Elmer Township is a township in Saint Louis County, Minnesota, United States. The population was 132 at the 2020 census.

Saint Louis County Highway 5 (CR 5) and County Highway 133 (CR 133) are two of the main routes in the township.

CR 5 runs north–south through the northeast portion of the township. CR 133 runs east–west through the middle of Elmer Township.

The unincorporated community of Elmer is located within the northeast corner of Elmer Township.

== Geography ==
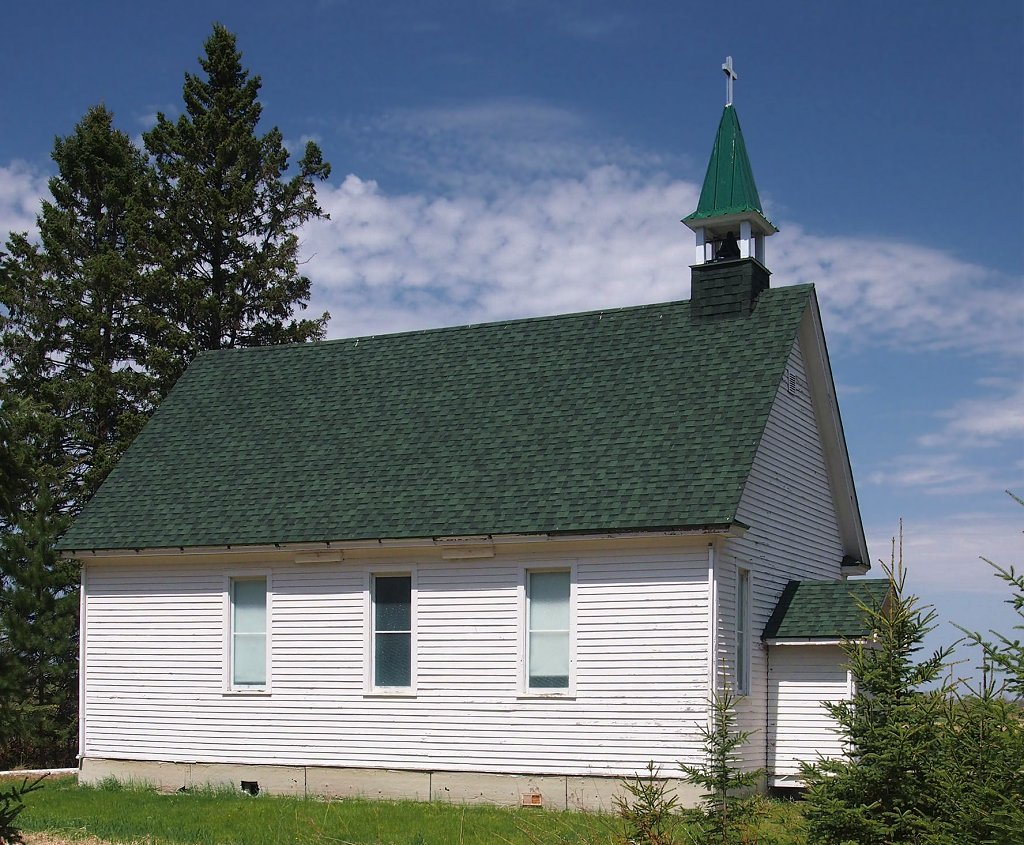
Church of St. Joseph

According to the United States Census Bureau, the township has a total area of 40.7 square miles (105 km^{2}); 40.6 square miles (105 km^{2}) is land and 0.1 square miles (0.26 km^{2}), or 0.32%, is water.

Joula Creek flows through the western portion of the township.

The Saint Louis River runs north–south along Elmer Township's eastern boundary line with adjacent Meadowlands Township.

=== Adjacent townships, cities, and communities ===
The following are adjacent to Elmer Township :

- Toivola Township (north)
- Meadowlands Township (east)
- The city of Meadowlands (east)
- Ness Township (southeast)
- Van Buren Township (south)
- The city of Floodwood (south)
- Potshot Lake Unorganized Territory (southwest)
- Cedar Valley Township (west and northwest)

=== Unincorporated communities ===
- Elmer

== Demographics ==
At the 2000 census there were 165 people, 59 households, and 47 families living in the township. The population density was 4.1 people per square mile (1.6/km^{2}). There were 66 housing units at an average density of 1.6/sq mi (0.6/km^{2}). The racial makeup of the township was 100.00% White. Of the 59 households 28.8% had children under the age of 18 living with them, 69.5% were married couples living together, 5.1% had a female householder with no husband present, and 20.3% were non-families. 20.3% of households were one person and 13.6% were one person aged 65 or older. The average household size was 2.80 and the average family size was 3.23.

The age distribution was 25.5% under the age of 18, 5.5% from 18 to 24, 24.2% from 25 to 44, 29.1% from 45 to 64, and 15.8% 65 or older. The median age was 42 years. For every 100 females, there were 106.3 males. For every 100 females age 18 and over, there were 115.8 males.

The median household income was $42,344 and the median family income was $43,250. Males had a median income of $32,917 versus $10,417 for females. The per capita income for the township was $17,418. About 20.8% of families and 19.9% of the population were below the poverty line, including 29.8% of those under the age of eighteen and 23.8% of those sixty five or over.
