= Mission Creek (Saint Louis River tributary) =

Stream in Minnesota, U.S.

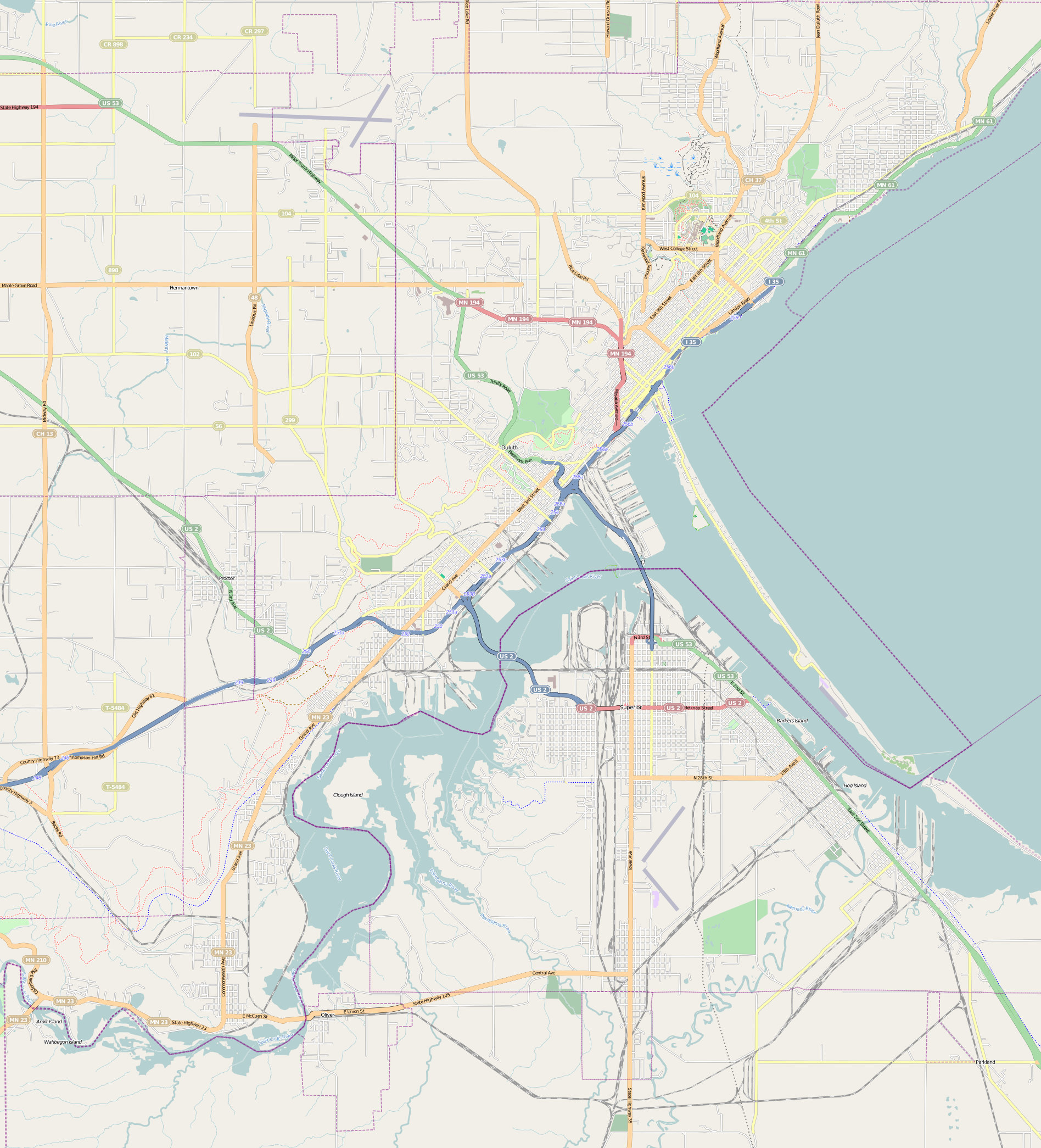
- Mouth of Mission Creek

Location
- Country: United States
- State: Minnesota
- County: Saint Louis
- City: Duluth

Physical characteristics
- Source
  - location: Midway Township
  - coordinates: 46.7198°N 92.2824°W
- Mouth
  - location: Saint Louis River
  - coordinates: 46.6585°N 92.2761°W
- Length: 30.4 mi-long (48.9 km)
- Basin size: 10.6 square miles (27 km^{2})

Mission Creek is a stream in the U.S. state of Minnesota. It is a tributary of the Saint Louis River.

Mission Creek took its name from an Ojibwe Indian mission founded near the creek.

== See also ==
- List of rivers of Minnesota
