= Wisconsin Highway 105 =

State highway in Wisconsin, United States

State Trunk Highway 105
- WIS 105 highlighted in red

Route information
- Maintained by WisDOT
- Length: 4.7 mi (7.6 km)

Major junctions
- West end: MN 39 in Oliver
- East end: WIS 35 in Superior

Location
- Country: United States
- State: Wisconsin
- Counties: Douglas

Highway system
- Wisconsin State Trunk Highway System; Interstate; US; State; Scenic; Rustic
← WIS 104	→ WIS 106

State Trunk Highway 105 (often called Highway 105, STH-105 or WIS 105) is a 4.7-mile (7.6 km) east–west state highway in Douglas County, Wisconsin, that connects Oliver (at the Minnesota border at Duluth) with Tower Avenue in Superior.

WIS 105 serves as an east–west arterial route between the city of Superior, the village of Oliver, and the Gary-New Duluth neighborhood of Duluth that passes through the Town of Superior.

== Route description ==
The western terminus of WIS 105 is at the state line with Minnesota at the Oliver Bridge. The bridge crosses the Saint Louis River to the Gary-New Duluth neighborhood in the city of Duluth. The highway follows Union Street through Oliver and 61st street into Superior. After crossing the river, WIS 105 becomes Minnesota State Highway 39 (MN 39, East McCuen Street). From its western terminus, WIS 105 runs east-west through Oliver, intersecting with County Trunk Highway W (CTH-W) in western Oliver. After exiting Oliver, it curves northeast through the town of Superior before entering the city of Superior. It then runs east-west through southern Superior before ending at an intersection with WIS 135. The highway is undivided for its entire length.

== History ==
WIS 105 was designated along a route resembling its current one between 1923 and 1926. Sometime between 1944 and 1956, middle of the route as smoothed between Oliver and Superior.

== Major intersections ==
The entire highway is in Douglas County.

Location	mi	km	Destinations	Notes
Saint Louis River	0.0	0.0	MN 39 west	Continuation into Minnesota
Saint Louis River	0.0	0.0	Oliver Bridge; Minnesota–Wisconsin state line	
Oliver	0.2	0.32	CTH-W south	
Superior	4.7	7.6	WIS 35 (Tower Avenue) – Superior, Siren	
1.000 mi = 1.609 km; 1.000 km = 0.621 mi
