= Toivola, Minnesota =

Toivola
- Unincorporated community
- Location within Minnesota Location within the United States
- Coordinates: 47°10′01″N 92°48′40″W
- Country: United States
- State: Minnesota
- County: Saint Louis
- Township: Toivola Township
- Elevation: 1,270 ft (390 m)

Population
  - Total: 20
- Time zone: UTC-6 (Central (CST))
  - Summer (DST): UTC-5 (CDT)
- ZIP codes: 55765
- Area code: 218
- GNIS feature ID: 662654

Toivola is an unincorporated community in Toivola Township, Saint Louis County, Minnesota, United States.

The community is located near Meadowlands at the junction of Saint Louis County Highway 5 and County Road 52 (Arkola Road).

Sand Creek flows through the community. The Saint Louis River is nearby.
