= Fond du Lac (Duluth) =

Neighborhood of Duluth, Minnesota

Coordinates: 46°39′35″N 92°16′24″W

Fond du Lac is a neighborhood in Duluth, Minnesota, United States.

Evergreen Memorial Highway (State Highway 23) serves as a main route in the community. The eastern terminus of State Highway 210 is in the Fond du Lac neighborhood near the Saint Louis River bridge.

== History ==
Fond du Lac (French: 'bottom of the lake') was the site of an Ojibwe settlement in the 16th through 19th centuries. The American Fur Company established a trading post in the community in 1817 and operated it for 25 years. Mission Creek was named for an Ojibwe mission located here in the 1830s. The American Fur Company post was purchased by the Missouri Fur Company in 1842 and continued operating until 1848. The 1826 and 1847 Treaties of Fond du Lac were signed at Fond du Lac.

A village was platted in 1856 and incorporated in 1857. In 1895, the city of Duluth annexed Fond du Lac.

== Adjacent neighborhoods ==
(Directions following those of Duluth's general street grid system, not actual geographical coordinates)

- Gary – New Duluth (east)
- Midway Township (north)

Historical population
Census	Pop.	Note	%±
1880	200		—
U.S. Decennial Census
