= Lake View Store =

Coordinates: 46°41′24.5″N 92°12′37.5″W

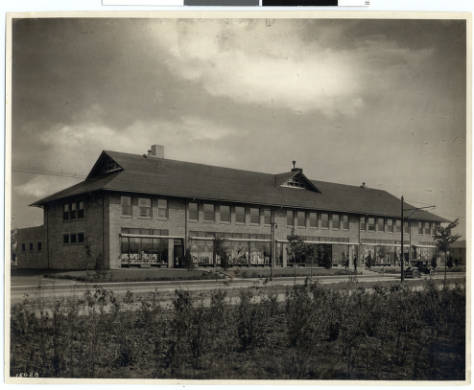
An exterior view of the Lake View Store building in Morgan Park, Duluth, Minnesota. (c. 1916)

The Lake View Store was the first modern indoor mall built in the United States . It was built in 1915, and held its grand opening on July 20, 1916. The architect was Dean & Dean from Chicago and the building contractor was George H. Lounsberry from Duluth. The mall building cost $75,000 to construct, a large sum of money in 1915.

The mall is located in the U.S. Steel former company town of Morgan Park, now the present day neighborhood of Morgan Park in the city of Duluth, Minnesota, on the northeast corner of Edward Street and 88th Avenue. The building is two stories with a full basement and shops were originally located on all three levels. All of the stores were located within the interior of the mall with some shops being accessible from both inside and out.

The Duluth News Tribune once reported that the "Lake View Store is the most modern store in Duluth" and "Every business concern in Morgan Park will be housed in a commodious building about 200 feet (61 m) long and 100 feet (30 m) wide".

This mall appeared in the November 1916 issue of The Minnesotan and the June 1918 issue of American Architect.

The mall's original business hours were Monday through Saturday from 9:00 AM to 6:00 PM. It was estimated that 10,000 people toured the mall on its opening day.

The first floor had a pharmacy and a department store with groceries, a butcher shop, clothing, hardware, furniture, and a general store. The second floor had a bank, dentist office, barber shop, hair salon, hat shop, billiard room, and auditorium.

The basement had a shoe store and an ice making plant which made eight tons of ice per day for the mall and for Morgan Park residents. The mall building and the department store were owned and operated by U.S. Steel, however the pharmacy, bank, barber shop, hair salon, and dentist were among the privately run businesses.

In September 1929, the mall's hardware store took first prize in the United States and third prize in the world, in a window display competition. This was out of 11,672 total entries. The window display featured a camping scene with a cabin. It was created by hardware store manager Walter B. Neipp.

The 1935 Duluth city directory lists the following businesses in the Lake View Store: Lake View Lodge, Morgan Park Company Real Estate, Lake View Department Store, Morgan Park Market, Dahl Barber Shop, Doctors Ryan & Elias, Schaefer Dentistry, Gjessing Tailor Shop, Tahtinen Shoe Rebuilder, and Park Pharmacy.

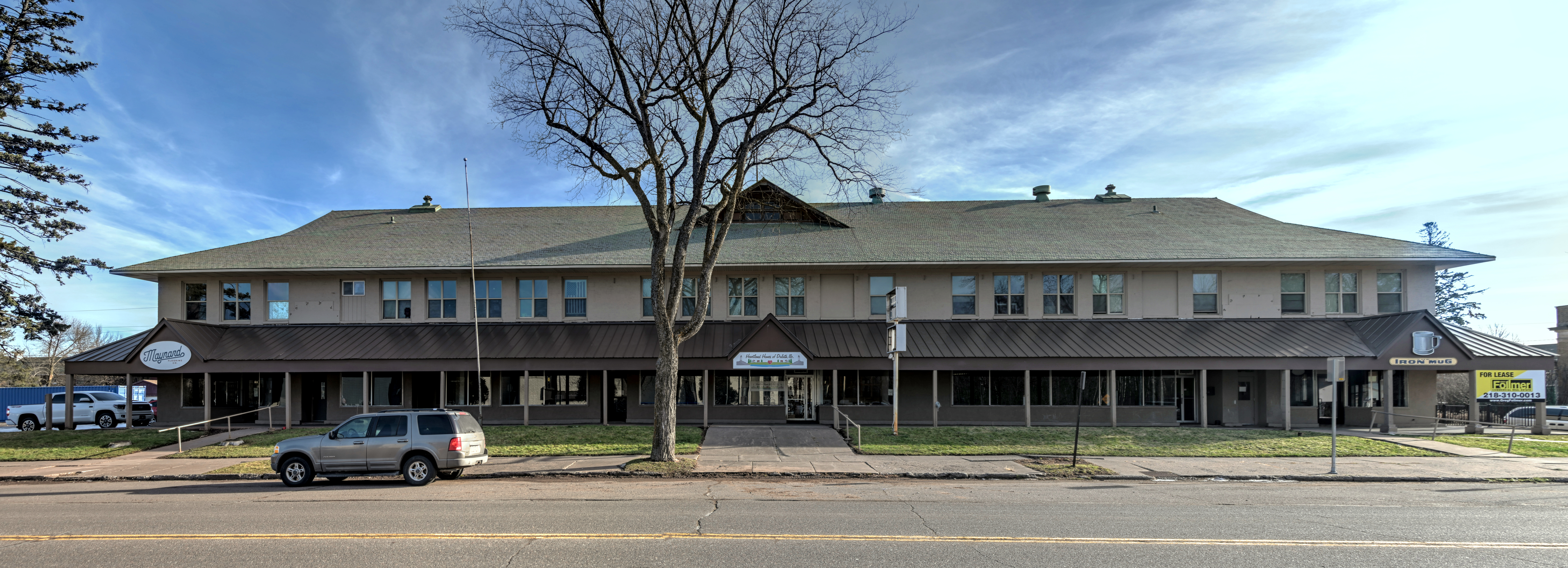
The Lake View Store in 2022

The interior of the mall was later remodeled so that each store was only accessible from the outside. This allowed for more room on the second floor which originally had a balcony and walkway that ran most of the length of the building. The mall still exists today and houses a hair salon, offices, retail space, and apartments.
