= Pokegama Creek =

Stream in Minnesota, U.S.

Coordinates: 45°52′02″N 93°02′31″W

Pokegama Creek in Pine County with its headwaters in Kanabec County is a stream in the U.S. state of Minnesota.

Pokegama is a name derived from the Ojibwe language Bakegamaa (/pɒʔˈkeɪkʌˌmɑː/) meaning "the water which juts off from another water", which describes Pokegama Lake that the Creek flows into in relation to the Snake River.

== See also ==
- List of rivers of Minnesota
