= Pokegama Bay =

- Location within Wisconsin Location within the United States
- Location: Douglas County, Wisconsin
- Coordinates: 46°41′26″N 92°10′02″W
- Type: Bay
- River sources: St. Louis River
- Surface elevation: 604 feet (184 m)
- Settlements: Superior

Pokegama Bay is a small bay in northwestern Douglas County, Wisconsin, United States, which the St Louis River flows. It makes up part of the border between Minnesota and Wisconsin. Pokegama River, named after the bay, flows into this bay.

Artist Eastman Johnson built a small cabin at Pokegama Bay while living in Wisconsin.
