= Interstate 535 =

Interstate Highway in Wisconsin and Minnesota

Interstate 535
- I-535 highlighted in red

Route information
- Auxiliary route of I-35
- Length: 2.78 mi (4.47 km)
- Existed: 1971–present
- NHS: Entire route

Major junctions
- South end: 5th Street in Superior, WI
- US 53 / WIS 35 in Superior, WI
- North end: I-35 / US 53 in Duluth, MN

Location
- Country: United States
- States: Wisconsin, Minnesota
- Counties: WI: Douglas; MN: St. Louis

Highway system
- Interstate Highway System; Main; Auxiliary; Suffixed; Business; Future
- Minnesota Trunk Highway System; Interstate; US; State; Legislative; Scenic
- Wisconsin State Trunk Highway System; Interstate; US; State; Scenic; Rustic
← I-494	MN	→ MN 610
← WIS 441	WI	→ I-794

Interstate 535 (I-535) is a 2.78-mile-long (4.47 km) auxiliary Interstate Highway spur route of I-35 in the US states of Minnesota and Wisconsin. It is paired with U.S. Highway 53 (US 53) along its entire route. The Interstate was part of the original 1956 Interstate Highway System and was completed in 1971. Since then, weight limits have been added to the Blatnik Bridge that carries the highway over Saint Louis Bay between Superior, Wisconsin, and Duluth, Minnesota.

== Route description ==
I-535 begins in the city of Superior, Wisconsin, at the junction of US 53 and State Trunk Highway 35 (WIS 35) and continues northwest across the Blatnik Bridge over the Saint Louis Bay of Lake Superior. The freeway crosses from Wisconsin into Minnesota on the bridge and then meets an interchange for Garfield Avenue and the Port Terminal in the city of Duluth. I-535 ends at the junction of US 53 and I-35, known locally as the "Can of Worms" interchange, which features a pair of left exits from I-35, a stoplight, and lane drops over the I-35 bridge.

In 2007, the Wisconsin Department of Transportation (WisDOT) surveys measured a traffic along their segment of I-535 at 21,800–29,500 vehicles daily, on average. The Minnesota Department of Transportation (MnDOT) measured 29,500 vehicles daily in their 2009 survey. As an Interstate Highway, I-535 is a part of the National Highway System, a network of roads important to the country's economy, defense, and mobility. I-535 is part of the Falls-to-Falls Corridor, a federally recognized trade corridor spanning from Eau Claire–Chippewa Falls, Wisconsin, to International Falls, Minnesota–Fort Frances, Ontario.

== History ==
I-535 was authorized in 1957 as part of the original Interstate Highway System. The Blatnik Bridge was opened in 1961, and the ramps to I-35 were completed in 1971. I-535 and the Blatnik Bridge replaced a swinging toll bridge at generally the same location. That bridge existed from 1897 to 1962 and carried US 53 from Connor's Point in Superior to Garfield Avenue in Duluth.

In November 2011, both MnDOT and WisDOT installed new signs to remind drivers that trucks over 40 short tons (36 t) gross vehicle weight cannot use the Blatnik Bridge; these vehicles will be rerouted to the nearby Bong Bridge. According to the press release, permitted, overweight vehicles have been restricted from using the Blatnik Bridge since early 2008 when inspections showed that corrosion and time were starting to affect the structure. Transportation officials say that the bridge is aging, and restriction of overweight vehicles will help to extend the life of the bridge. Drivers who disregard the posted weight limits will be ticketed.

== Exit list ==
All exits are unnumbered.

State	County	Location	mi (Note: Distance measurements reset at the state line.)	km	Destinations	Notes
Wisconsin	Douglas	Superior	0.00	0.00	Fifth Street, Hammond Avenue	Roadway continues to the south as Hammond Avenue; southern end of freeway
Wisconsin	Douglas	Superior	0.12	0.19	US 53 south to US 2 east WIS 35 south to US 2 west	Southern end of US 53 concurrency; southbound exit and northbound entrance
Saint Louis Bay			1.21 0.000	1.95 0.000	Blatnik Bridge; Minnesota–Wisconsin state line	
Minnesota	St. Louis	Duluth	0.536– 0.705	0.863– 1.135	Garfield Avenue – Port Terminal	
Minnesota	St. Louis	Duluth	1.429– 1.457	2.300– 2.345	I-35 north / LSCT to MN 61	Northbound exit and southbound entrance, I-35 exit 255
Minnesota	St. Louis	Duluth	1.571	2.528	I-35 south / LSCT – Minneapolis, Saint Paul	Southbound exit and northbound entrance; I-35 exit 255
Minnesota	St. Louis	Duluth	1.571	2.528	US 53 north (21st Avenue West) – Virginia	Northern end of US 53 concurrency; Can of Worms interchange
1.000 mi = 1.609 km; 1.000 km = 0.621 mi: Concurrency terminus; Incomplete access
