= Church of St. Joseph (Elmer, Minnesota) =

Historic church building in Elmer, Minnesota

- Church of St. Joseph (Catholic)
- U.S. National Register of Historic Places
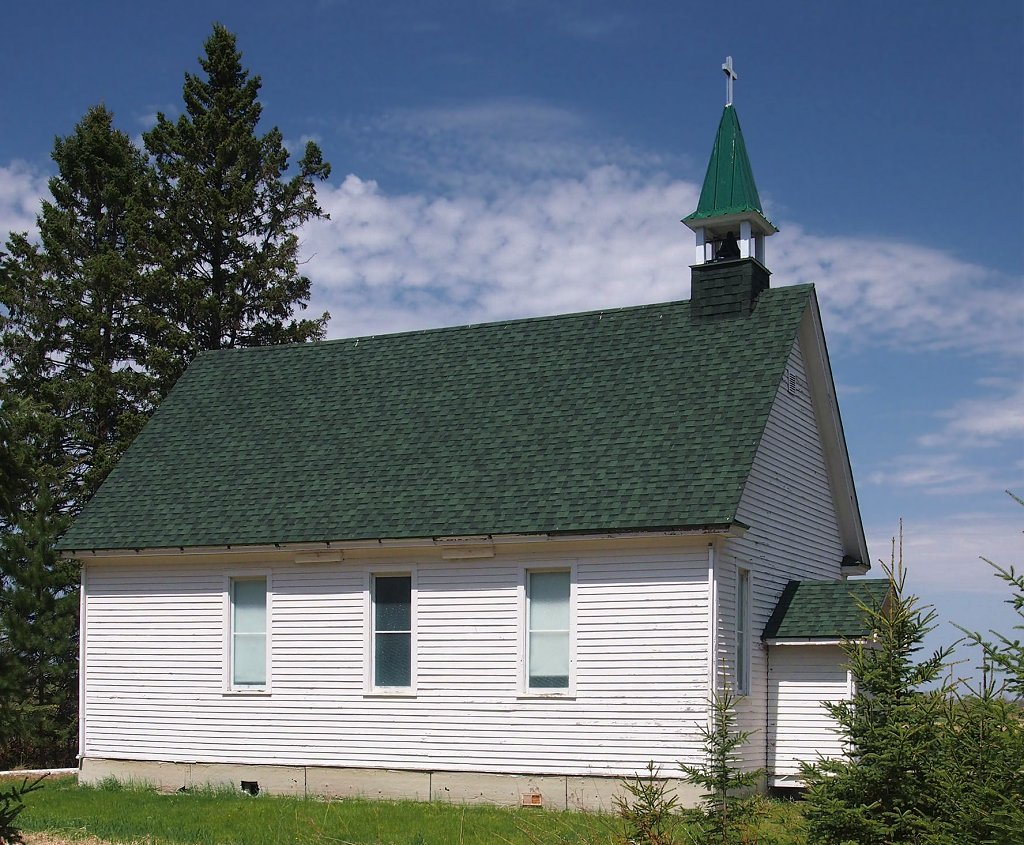
- The Church of St. Joseph from the southeast

- Location within Minnesota Location within the United States
- Location: 7897 Elmer Road, Elmer, Minnesota
- Coordinates: 47°5′1.2″N 92°46′37″W
- Area: 5 acres (2.0 ha)
- Built: 1913
- NRHP reference No.: 02000940
- Added to NRHP: September 6, 2002

The Church of St. Joseph is a former Roman Catholic church building in the unincorporated community of Elmer, Minnesota, United States. It was built in 1913 by the Duluth and Iron Range Railroad as a bonus to settlers the company had recruited to buy its surplus land. The Church of St. Joseph was listed on the National Register of Historic Places in 2002 for its local significance in the theme of exploration/settlement. The nomination includes the associated cemetery, located across the road to the east. The property was nominated for illustrating the corporate efforts to settle northern Minnesota once it had been cleared of valuable timber.

== History ==
To encourage development of northern Minnesota's transportation infrastructure, the state legislature granted the Duluth and Iron Range Railroad 10 sections of land for every mile of track laid. The railroad profited by leasing the land for logging, but sought to dispose of it once it was cut over by enticing settlers to buy and farm it. One of the railroad's land agents recruited 25 Roman Catholic Austro-Hungarian immigrants from Chicago to settle what the company marketed as "St. Joseph's Colony", with this church as its nucleus.

The Roman Catholic Diocese of Duluth dissolved St. Joseph's Parish in 1962 due to a shortage of priests. The church still hosted a monthly mass and occasional weddings, funerals, and baptisms. In 1990 several descendants of the original settlers formed an organization to maintain the building, which was ultimately deconsecrated in 2001.

== See also ==
- List of Catholic churches in the United States
- National Register of Historic Places listings in St. Louis County, Minnesota
