= Toivola Township, St. Louis County, Minnesota =

Toivola Township, Minnesota
- Township
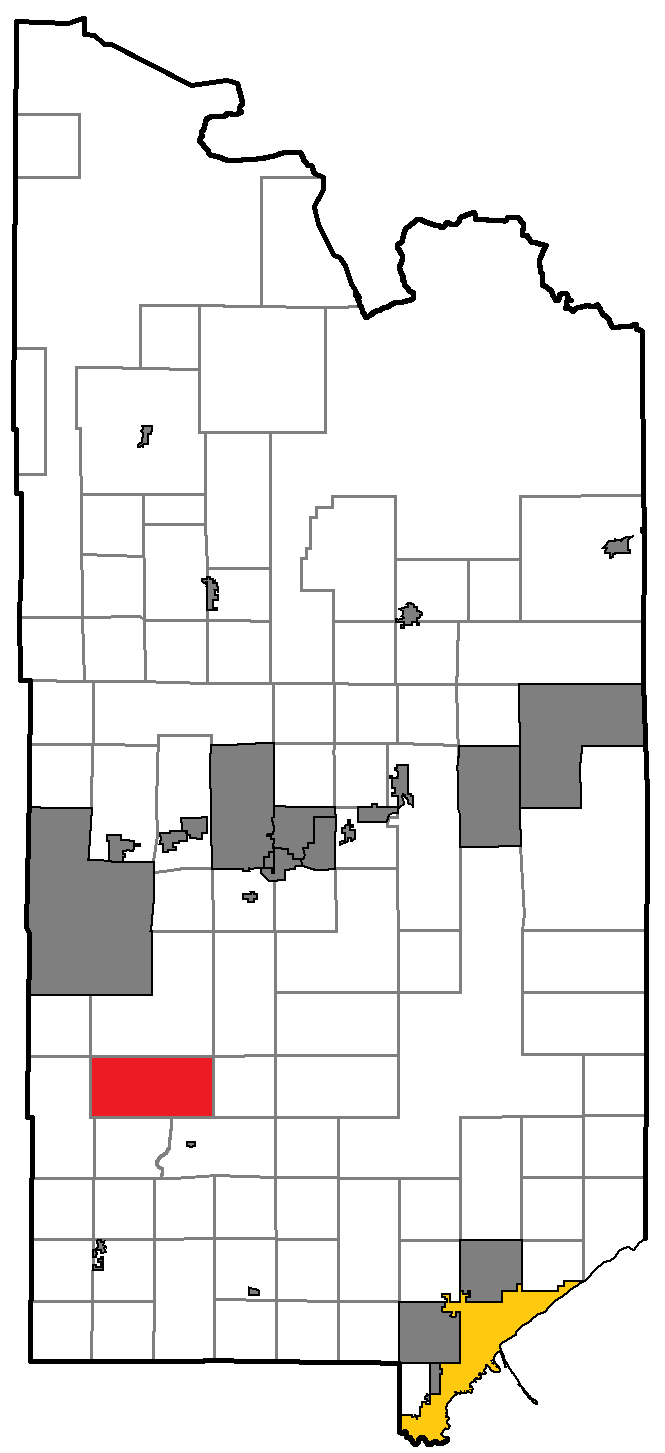
- Location of Toivola Township within St. Louis County, Minnesota

- Location within the state of Minnesota Toivola Township, Minnesota (the United States)
- Coordinates: 47°9′4″N 92°47′5″W
- Country: United States
- State: Minnesota
- County: Saint Louis

Area
  - Total: 71.9 sq mi (186.3 km^{2})
  - Land: 71.7 sq mi (185.6 km^{2})
  - Water: 0.27 sq mi (0.7 km^{2})
- Elevation: 1,280 ft (390 m)

Population (2020)
  - Total: 179
  - Density: 2.50/sq mi (0.964/km^{2})
- Time zone: UTC-6 (Central (CST))
  - Summer (DST): UTC-5 (CDT)
- FIPS code: 27-65146
- GNIS feature ID: 0665795

Toivola Township is a township in St. Louis County, Minnesota, United States. At the 2020 census, the population was 179. Toivola is a name Finnish in origin.

Saint Louis County Highway 5 (CR 5) serves as a main route in Toivola Township.

CR 5 runs north–south through the middle of the township.

County Road 52 (Arkola Road) also passes through the eastern portion of the township.

The unincorporated community of Toivola is located within Toivola Township.

== Geography ==
According to the United States Census Bureau, the township has a total area of 71.9 square miles (186 km^{2}); 71.7 square miles (186 km^{2}) is land and 0.3 square miles (0.78 km^{2}), or 0.38%, is water.

The Saint Louis River runs north–south through the middle of the township.

Sand Creek flows through the northwest portion of Toivola Township.

=== Adjacent townships, cities, and communities ===
The following are adjacent to Toivola Township :

- Kelsey Township (east)
- Meadowlands Township (southeast)
- The city of Meadowlands (southeast)
- Elmer Township (south)
- Cedar Valley Township (west and southwest)
- Janette Lake Unorganized Territory (northwest)
- The unincorporated community of Silica (northwest)
- Lavell Township (north)
- McDavitt Township (northeast)

=== Unincorporated communities ===
- Toivola

== Demographics ==
As of the census of 2000, there were 196 people, 75 households, and 54 families living in the township. The population density was 2.7 people per square mile (1.1/km^{2}). There were 95 housing units at an average density of 1.3/sq mi (0.5/km^{2}). The racial makeup of the township was 95.92% White, 1.02% Asian, 0.51% from other races, and 2.55% from two or more races. Hispanic or Latino of any race were 2.04% of the population.

There were 75 households, out of which 18.7% had children under 18 living with them, 64.0% were married couples living together, 5.3% had a female householder with no husband present, and 28.0% were non-families. 22.7% of all households were made up of individuals, and 6.7% had someone living alone who was 65 years of age or older. The average household size was 2.32 and the average family size was 2.67.

In the township the population was spread out, with 19.9% under the age of 18, 5.1% from 18 to 24, 28.6% from 25 to 44, 30.1% from 45 to 64, and 16.3% who were 65 years of age or older. The median age was 42 years. For every 100 females, there were 96.0 males. For every 100 females age 18 and over, there were 98.7 males.

The median income for a household in the township was $27,321, and the median income for a family was $40,417. Males had a median income of $24,167 versus $18,750 for females. The per capita income for the township was $12,252. About 5.8% of families and 9.2% of the population were below the poverty line, including none of those under the age of eighteen and 10.3% of those 65 or over.
