= Oliver, Wisconsin =

- Village
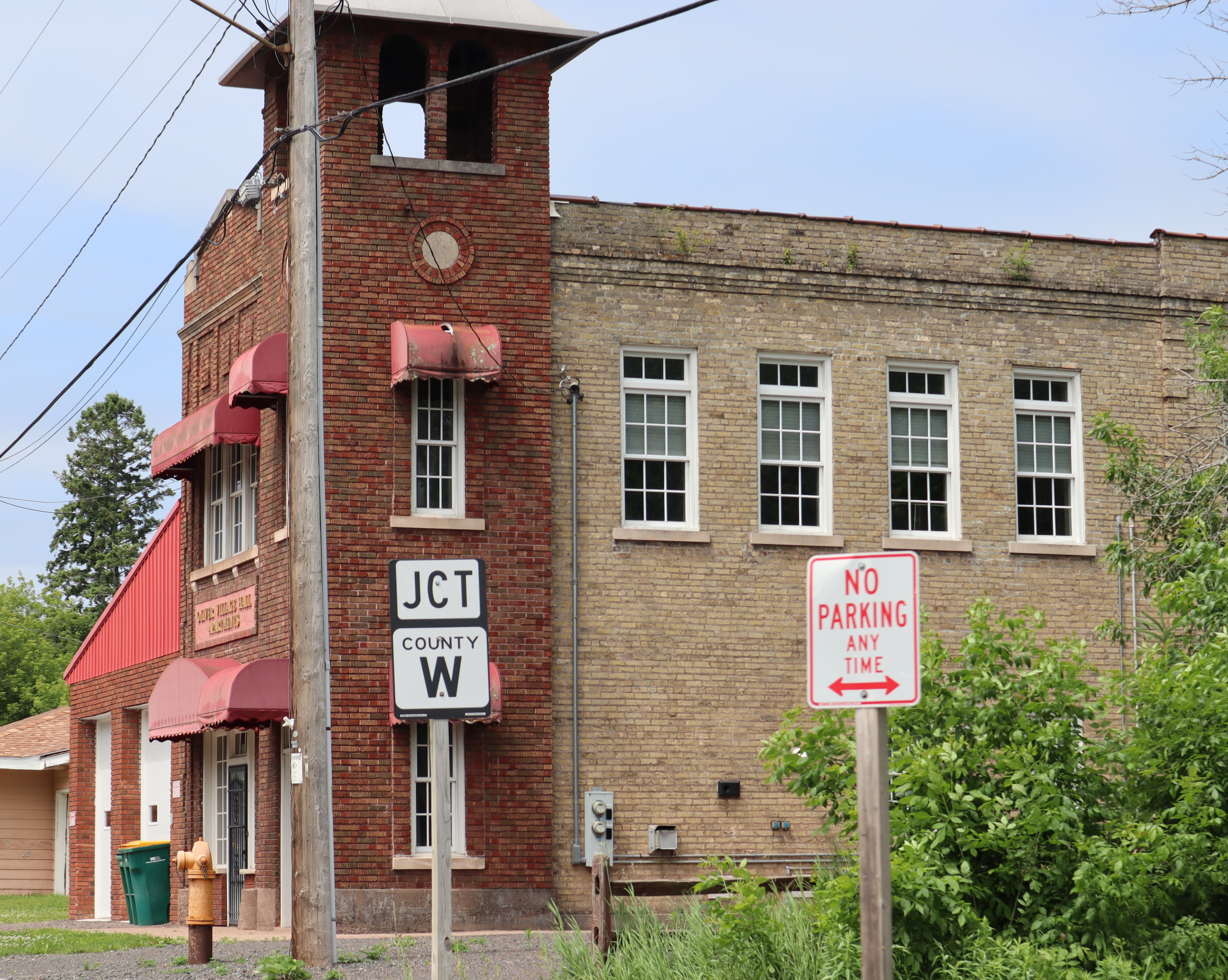
- Oliver Village Hall Apartments

- Location of Oliver in Douglas County, Wisconsin.
- Coordinates: 46°39′26″N 92°11′32″W
- Country: United States
- State: Wisconsin
- County: Douglas

Area
  - Total: 2.10 sq mi (5.43 km^{2})
  - Land: 2.07 sq mi (5.37 km^{2})
  - Water: 0.023 sq mi (0.06 km^{2})
- Elevation: 646 ft (197 m)

Population (2020)
  - Total: 423
  - Estimate (2022): 423
  - Density: 202/sq mi (77.9/km^{2})
- Time zone: UTC-6 (Central (CST))
  - Summer (DST): UTC-5 (CDT)
- Area codes: 715 and 534
- FIPS code: 55-59800
- GNIS feature ID: 1570799
- Website: www.villageofoliver.org

Oliver is a village in Douglas County, Wisconsin, United States. The population was 423 at the 2020 census.

Oliver is located 5 miles (8.0 km) west of the city of Superior and 0.3 miles (0.48 km) east of Gary – New Duluth, Duluth, Minnesota.

== Transportation ==
Union Street (Wisconsin Highway 105) serves as a main route in the community. The Oliver Bridge across the Saint Louis River connects the village of Oliver with the city of Duluth, Minnesota and the nearby neighborhood of Gary – New Duluth.

== Geography ==
Oliver is located at 46°39′26″N 92°11′32″W (46.657291, -92.192319).

According to the United States Census Bureau, the village has a total area of 2.08 square miles (5.39 km^{2}), of which 2.06 square miles (5.34 km^{2}) is land and 0.02 square miles (0.05 km^{2}) is water.

== Demographics ==
Historical population
Census	Pop.	Note	%±
1920	153		—
1930	167		9.2%
1940	201		20.4%
1950	210		4.5%
1960	222		5.7%
1970	210		−5.4%
1980	253		20.5%
1990	265		4.7%
2000	358		35.1%
2010	399		11.5%
2020	423		6.0%
2022 (est.)	423	Steady	0.0%
U.S. Decennial Census

=== 2010 census ===
As of the census of 2010, there were 399 people, 159 households, and 116 families living in the village. The population density was 193.7 inhabitants per square mile (74.8/km^{2}). There were 167 housing units at an average density of 81.1 per square mile (31.3/km^{2}). The racial makeup of the village was 96.5% White, 1.3% Native American, 0.5% Asian, and 1.8% from two or more races. Hispanic or Latino of any race were 0.3% of the population.

There were 159 households, of which 35.8% had children under the age of 18 living with them, 57.9% were married couples living together, 9.4% had a female householder with no husband present, 5.7% had a male householder with no wife present, and 27.0% were non-families. 22.0% of all households were made up of individuals, and 6.3% had someone living alone who was 65 years of age or older. The average household size was 2.51 and the average family size was 2.92.

The median age in the village was 41.9 years. 25.6% of residents were under the age of 18; 4.6% were between the ages of 18 and 24; 24.6% were from 25 to 44; 37.1% were from 45 to 64; and 8.3% were 65 years of age or older. The gender makeup of the village was 51.4% male and 48.6% female.

=== 2000 census ===
As of the census of 2000, there were 358 people, 127 households, and 105 families living in the village. The population density was 174.9 people per square mile (67.4/km^{2}). There were 128 housing units at an average density of 62.5 per square mile (24.1/km^{2}). The racial makeup of the village was 97.21% White, 1.68% Native American, and 1.12% from two or more races.

There were 127 households, out of which 44.1% had children under the age of 18 living with them, 66.9% were married couples living together, 12.6% had a female householder with no husband present, and 17.3% were non-families. 12.6% of all households were made up of individuals, and 3.1% had someone living alone who was 65 years of age or older. The average household size was 2.82 and the average family size was 3.04.

In the village, the population was spread out, with 30.2% under the age of 18, 6.1% from 18 to 24, 31.6% from 25 to 44, 23.2% from 45 to 64, and 8.9% who were 65 years of age or older. The median age was 37 years. For every 100 females, there were 105.7 males. For every 100 females age 18 and over, there were 101.6 males.

The median income for a household in the village was $41,750, and the median income for a family was $45,250. Males had a median income of $35,625 versus $20,357 for females. The per capita income for the village was $19,527. About 4.9% of families and 8.3% of the population were below the poverty line, including 14.1% of those under age 18 and 10.0% of those age 65 or over.

== See also ==
- List of villages in Wisconsin
