= Oliver Bridge =

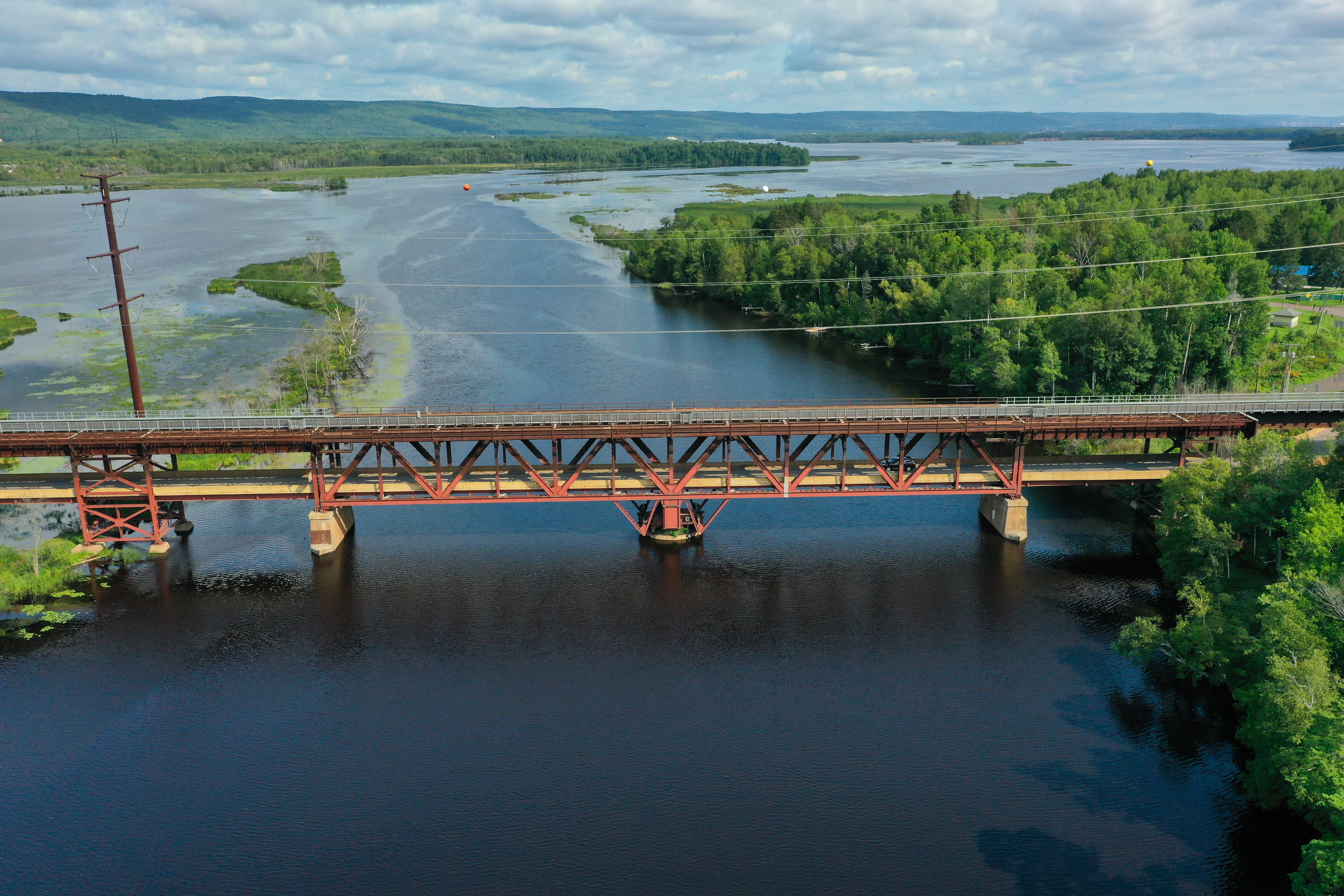
- The eastern spans of the Oliver Bridge
- Coordinates: 46°39′24″N 92°12′07″W
- Carries: Single track rail line, Roadway
- Crosses: Saint Louis River
- Locale: Gary – New Duluth
- Owner: Canadian National Railway

Characteristics
- Material: Steel truss
- Total length: 1,900 feet

History
- Constructed by: Interstate Transfer Railway Company
- Opened: 1916

The Oliver Bridge is a bridge across the Saint Louis River. It was constructed in 1910 as a railway bridge by the Interstate Transfer Railway Company, a Wisconsin corporation, under special federal authorization from the 60th United States Congress. A lower deck carrying road traffic was constructed in 1917 It connects the Gary – New Duluth neighborhood in Duluth, Minnesota with the village of Oliver, Wisconsin. The bridge is 1,889 feet (576 m) long and is principally of steel truss construction.

The upper deck carries a single track rail line and a lower deck carries the road connecting Wisconsin Highway 105 to Minnesota State Highway 39.

The upper deck was built to allow a streetcar line to be constructed from Gary–New Duluth to south Superior connecting the Duluth and Superior streetcar systems. The line was never built and the systems were connected across the Twin Ports Harbor.

On the Oliver side, a section of the bridge was built to swing, allowing passage of large vessels despite the river only being navigable for a few miles upstream of the bridge. Only one vessel is ever thought to have used this facility, a ferry excursion boat operating between the Duluth harbor and the Fond du Lac neighborhood of Duluth. The ferry service ceased in the 1930s and the swing section has not operated since.

The road deck was originally a wooden deck. Modernization came in 2000 when both states' transportation departments (WisDOT and Mn/DOT) cooperated with the Duluth, Missabe and Iron Range Railway to jointly fund a reconstruction of the roadway surface, which is constructed of a stronger steel with a reinforced concrete deck. A weight restriction, which was lowered to one ton as the road deck deteriorated, was then lifted.

A pedestrian walkway atop the railway deck fell into disrepair and is no longer usable.

The Oliver Bridge is owned by the Canadian National Railway.
