= Saint Louis River (Lake Superior tributary) =

River in Minnesota and Wisconsin

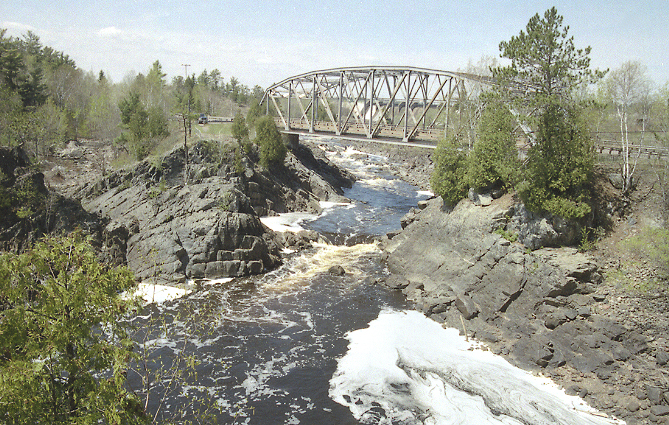
- The Saint Louis River at Thomson, Minnesota

- Mouth of the St. Louis River
- Native name: Gichigami-ziibi (Ojibwe)

Location
- Country: United States
- State: Minnesota, Wisconsin
- County: St. Louis and Carlton Counties, Minnesota; Douglas County, Wisconsin

Physical characteristics
- Source
  - location: Babbitt SE
  - coordinates: 47.5010312°N 91.8307225°W
- Mouth: Lake Superior
  - location: West Duluth
  - coordinates: 46.75°N 92.1°W
- Length: 192 miles (309 km)
- Basin size: 3,634 sq mi (9,410 sq km)

The Saint Louis River (abbreviated St. Louis River) is a river in the U.S. states of Minnesota and Wisconsin that flows into Lake Superior. The largest U.S. river to flow into the lake, it is 192 miles (309 km) in length and starts 13 miles (21 km) east of Hoyt Lakes, Minnesota. The river's watershed covers 3,634 square miles (9,410 km^{2}). Near the Twin Ports of Duluth, Minnesota and Superior, Wisconsin, the river becomes a freshwater estuary.

== History ==
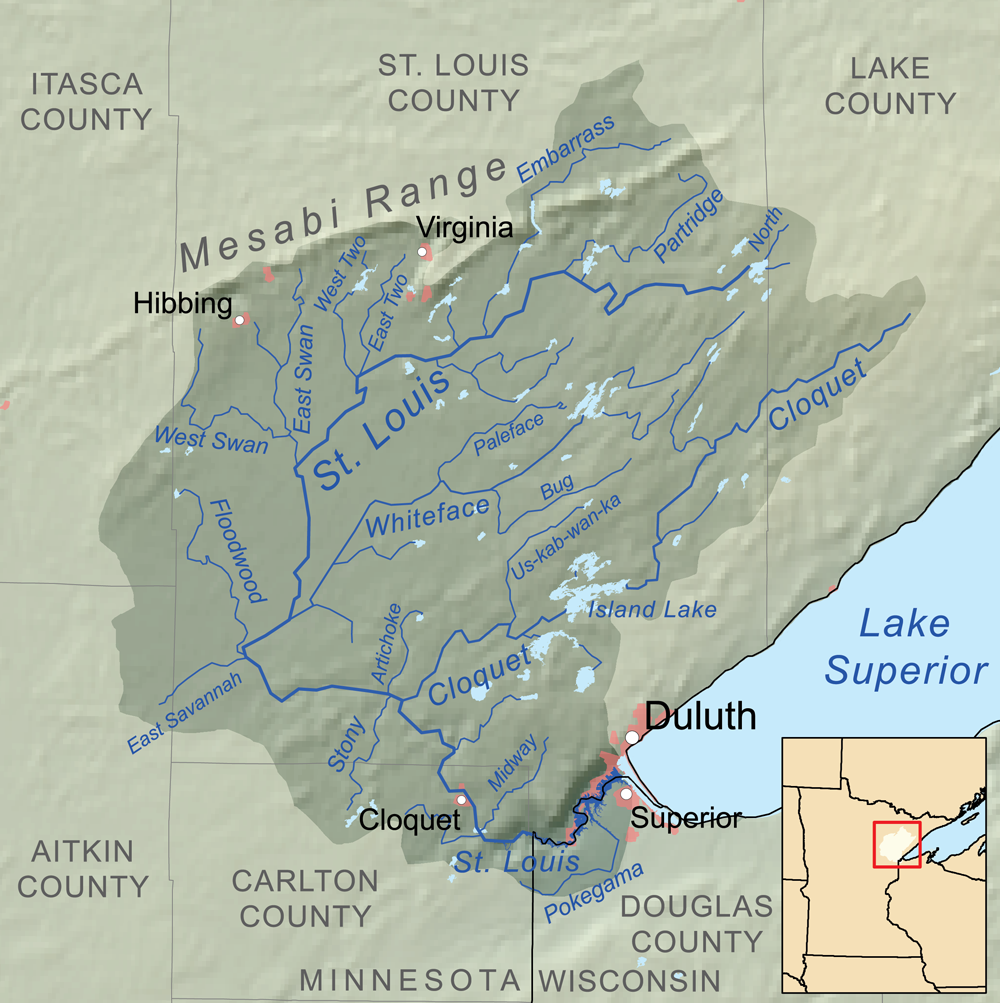
Saint Louis River drainage basin

According to Warren Upham:

The river was probably so named by Verendrye (born 1685, died 1749), who was a very active explorer, in the years 1731 and onward, of the vast country from Pigeon river and Rainy lake to the Saskatchewan and Missouri rivers, establishing trading posts and missions. The king of France, in 1749, shortly before the death of Verendrye, conferred on him the cross of St. Louis as a recognition of the importance of his discoveries, and thence the name of the St. Louis river appears to have come. On Franquelin's map (1688) and Buache's map (1754), it is called the Riviére du Fond du Lac; and the map by Vaugondy (1755) and Carver's map (1778) are the earliest to give the present name. St. Louis county has the distinction of being the largest county in this state, having an area of 6,611.75 square miles.

The river was a vital link connecting the Mississippi River waterways to the west with the Great Lakes to the east. In the late 1800s and early 1900s, the St. Louis River competed with the St. Croix River as a candidate for a canal linking the Mississippi River with the Great Lakes. The US Army Corps of Engineers ultimately concluded in 1913 that such a canal would be "inadvisable, infeasible, and impractical".

Jay Cooke State Park is located near the mouth of the river and is the site of a canoe portage used by Native Americans, European explorers, fur traders, Voyageurs, coureurs des bois, and missionaries of the 18th and 19th centuries. It was a rough trail of steep hills and swamps that began at the foot of the rapids above the neighborhood of Fond du Lac ("bottom of the lake") and climbed some 450 feet (140 m) to the present-day city of Carlton. Above Carlton, travelers proceeded upstream and continued on to Lake Vermillion and the Rainy River. Or they may have traveled southwest up the East Savanna River, portaged the grueling 6-mile long Savanna Portage (now a state park), and then paddled on to the Mississippi River.

== Pollution ==
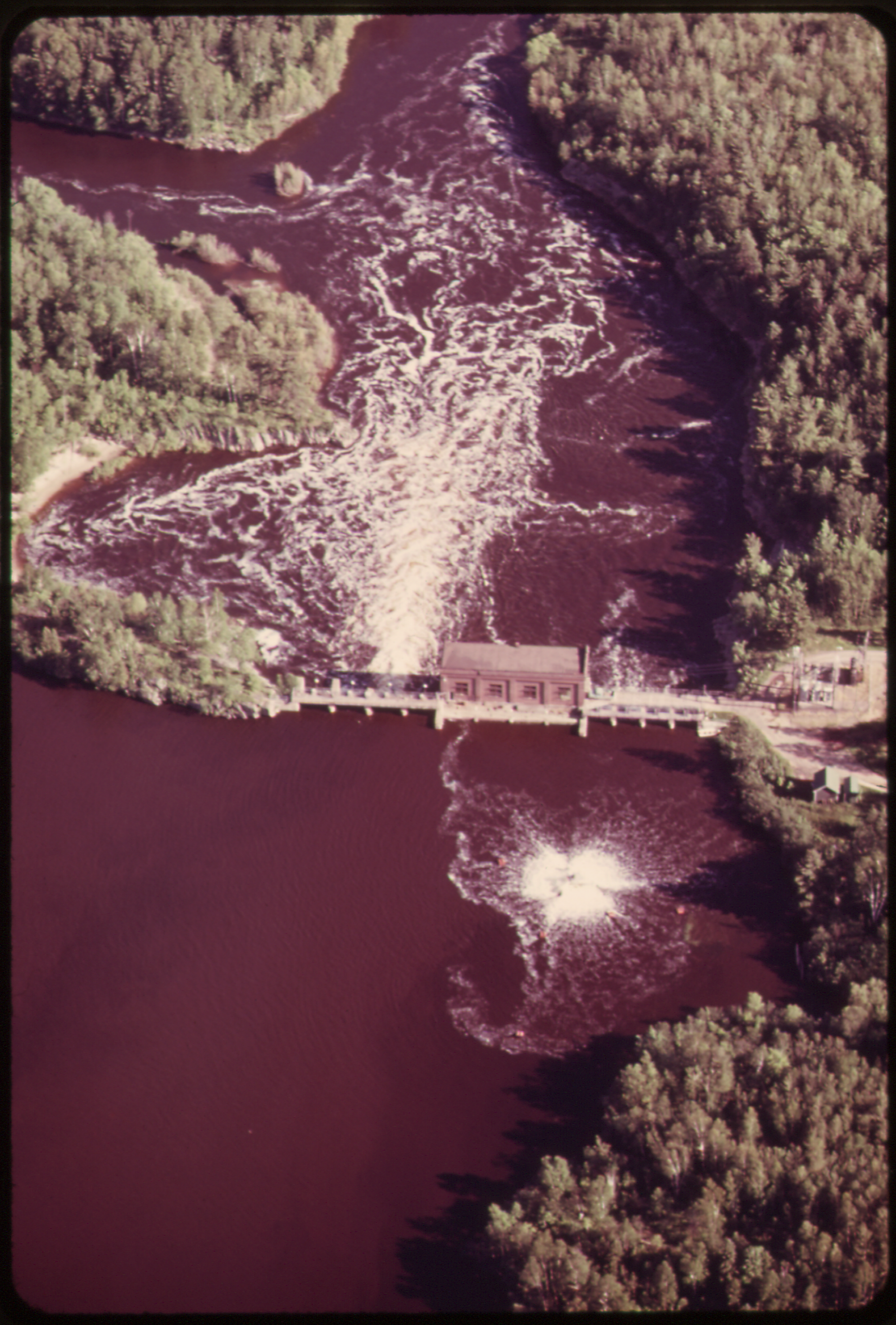
Northwest Paper Company discharges sulfite into the river at Cloquet, 1973

By the mid 20th century, the lower Saint Louis River became one of the most heavily polluted waterways in the state. Holling Clancy Holling, in his 1941 book Paddle-to-the-Sea, illustrated the polluted state of the Saint Louis River. In 1987, the river became a designated Area of Concern, administered by the Environmental Protection Agency as a result of significant sediment contamination and habitat loss (see next section).

The Western Lake Superior Sanitary District (WLSSD) was established in 1971 to address serious pollution problems in the lower Saint Louis River Basin. WLSSD's regional wastewater treatment plant began operating in 1978. Within two years, fish populations rebounded and anglers began returning to the river.

In 2013 the State of Minnesota ended a project intended to research the mercury problem in the river. The cooperating agencies, including Wisconsin DNR and the Fond du Lac Band of Lake Superior Chippewa, did not agree to end the study. In 2024, the Minnesota Pollution Control Agency began the process to develop a St. Louis River Watershed Mercury Total Maximum Daily Load, with a goal of obtaining EPA approval in 2027. High levels of mercury in fish tissue have resulted in the issuance of fish consumption guidance by the Minnesota Department of Health.

=== Saint Louis River AOC ===
The St. Louis River Area of Concern (AOC) is one of 43 AOCs across the Great Lakes designated under the Great Lakes Water Quality Agreement in 1987. It is a bi-state (Minnesota and Wisconsin) AOC. The AOC boundary includes the lower 39 miles (63 km) of the St. Louis River, from upstream of Cloquet, Minnesota, to its mouth at the Duluth/Superior Harbor and Lake Superior, and the Nemadji River watershed. Draining 3,634 square miles (9,410 km^{2}) of watershed and encompassing a 1,020-square-mile (2,600 km^{2}) area, the St. Louis River is the second largest U.S.-based AOC. As the largest tributary to Lake Superior, the St. Louis River is vital to the regional economy and encompasses the Port of Duluth-Superior, an essential port for Great Lakes shipping.

Historical industrial use of the river, before the onset of modern environmental laws, has resulted in the degradation of habitat and sediments contaminated with: mercury, dioxins, polychlorinated biphenyls (PCBs), polycyclic aromatic hydrocarbons (PAHs), and other toxins. Pollutants in the AOC are also due to: historical discharges, Superfund sites, discharges from wastewater and from landfills, and other point-source discharges within the AOC.

An impairment of beneficial uses means a change in the chemical, physical or biological integrity of the Great Lakes system sufficient to cause significant environmental degradation. A 1992 Remedial Action Plan determined that nine "beneficial use impairments" existed in the AOC including:

- Fish Consumption Advisories
- Degraded Fish and Wildlife Populations (removed in 2023)
- Fish Tumors and Other Deformities (removed in 2019)
- Degradation of Benthos
- Restrictions on Dredging
- Excessive Loading of Sediment and Nutrients (removed in 2020)
- Beach Closings and Body Contact Restrictions
- Degradation of Aesthetics (removed in 2014)
- Loss of Fish and Wildlife Habitat

As shown above, some of these impairments have already been removed. Once all nine Beneficial Use Impairments have been removed, application can be made for delisting, which means the ecological benefits of the St. Louis River have been restored to an acceptable level.

== Recreation ==
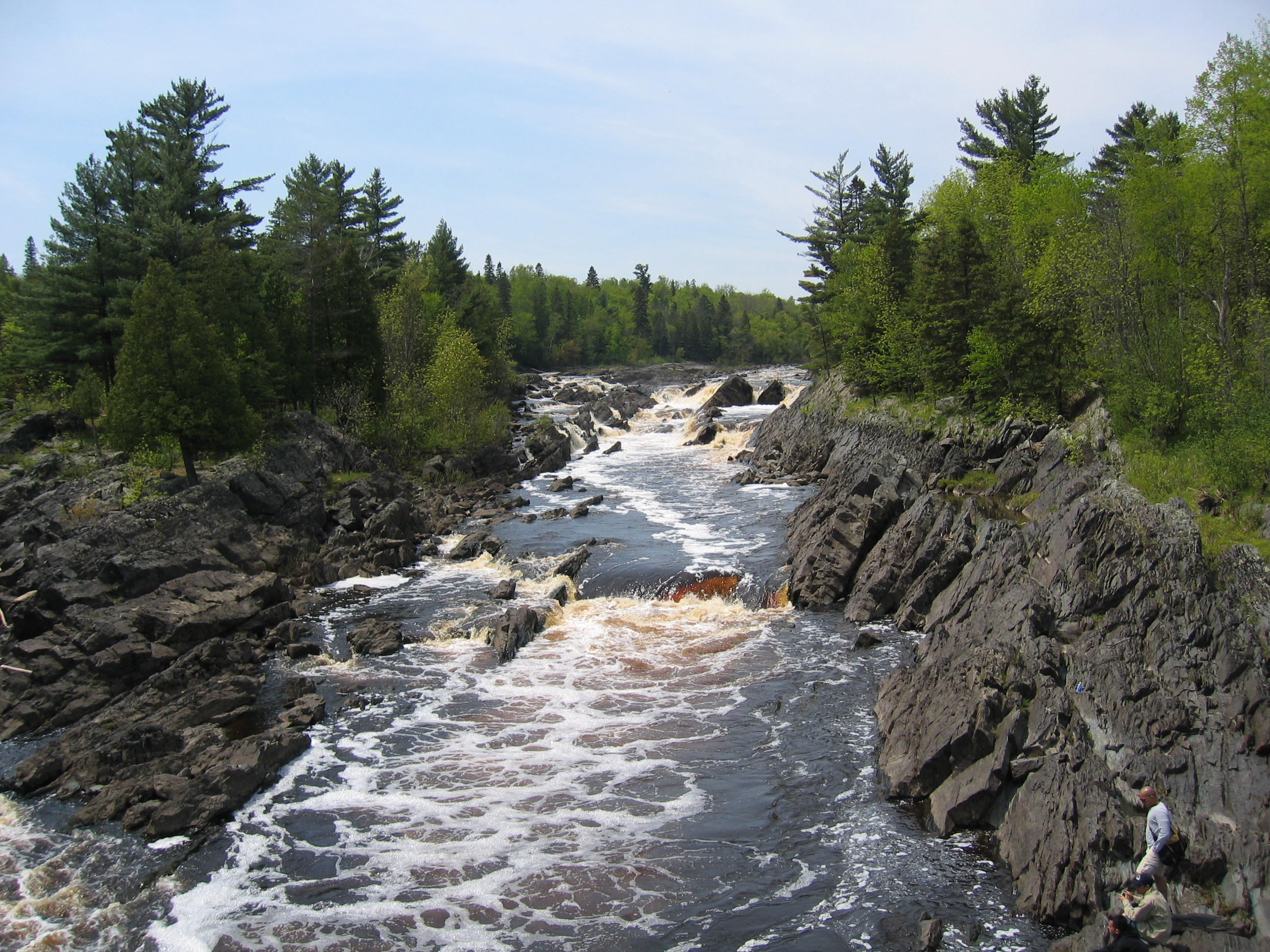
Saint Louis River Rapids seen from the hanging bridge in Jay Cooke State Park

The river is fished for walleye, northern pike, smallmouth bass, largemouth bass, bluegill, black crappie, and channel catfish populations. Other species of rough fish include Shorthead Redhorse and White Sucker. The river is frequented by those traveling the Minnesota DNR Saint Louis River Water Trail, which has campsites and angling.

Attempts to introduce sturgeon are underway by restoring habitat, stocking the fish, and monitoring their movements. While native to the river at one time, overfishing and pollution nearly wiped them out many years ago. In 1983 the DNR, the Fond du Lac Band of Lake Superior Chippewa, and others began rebuilding spawning habitat and introducing baby sturgeon into the river. In 2016 MPR reported, "Slowly, steadily, numbers increased as the stocked fish took hold in the river. Five years ago, tribal biologists found their first fry from naturally reproducing sturgeon, a sign that a healthy fish population could grow on its own. Minnesota even began allowing catch-and-release fishing last year."

The Saint Louis River Trail Association is planning the construction of a long-distance hiking trail along more than half the length of the river. Construction of the first 36-mile segment began in early 2012, with cooperation from the Minnesota DNR; the trail association hopes to have this section completed in 2015.

== See also ==
- List of crossings of the Saint Louis River
- List of rivers of Minnesota
- List of longest streams of Minnesota
- List of rivers of Wisconsin
- Pokegama Bay

== Gallery ==
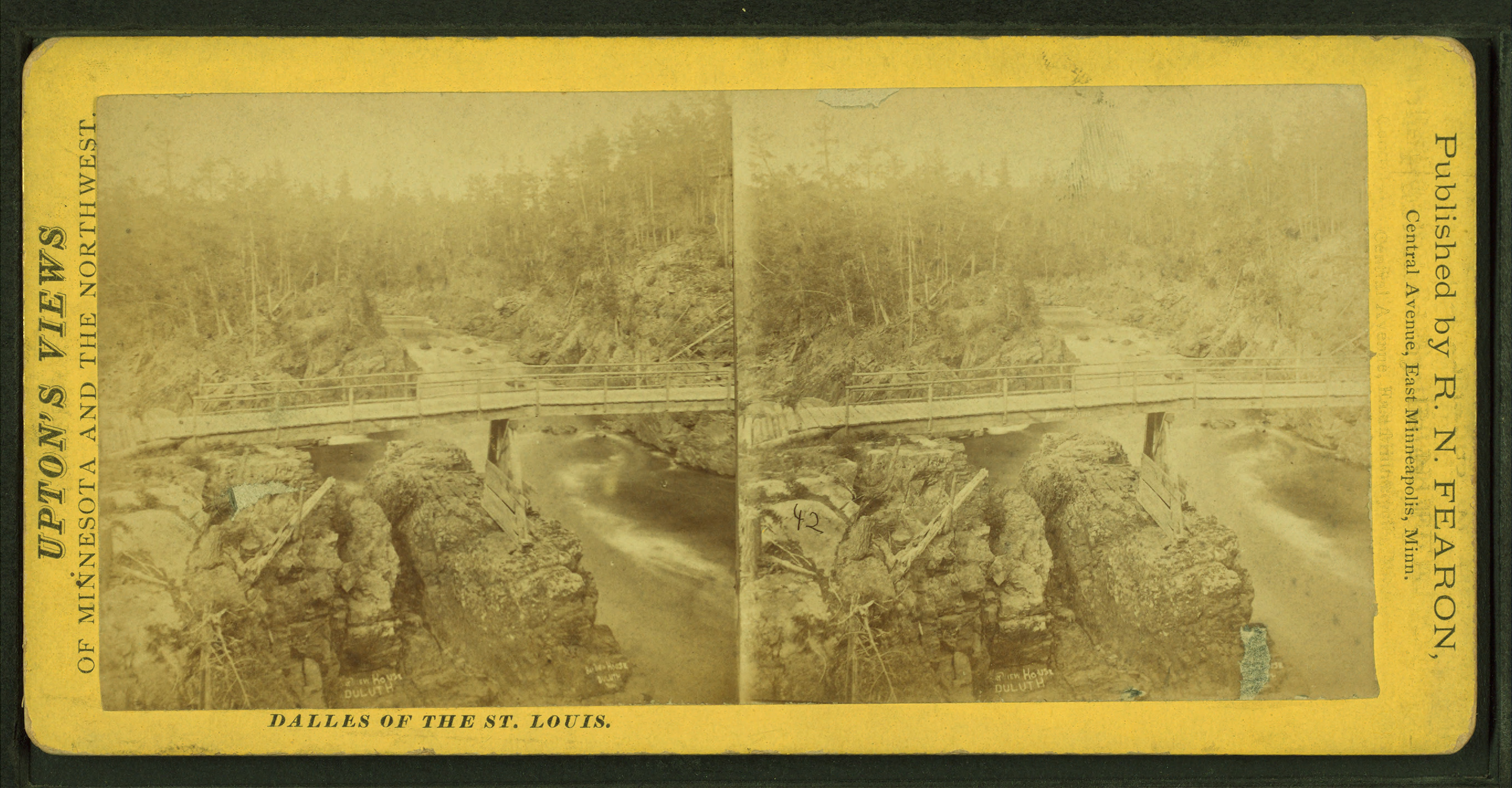
Dalles of the St. Louis, by R. N. Fearon

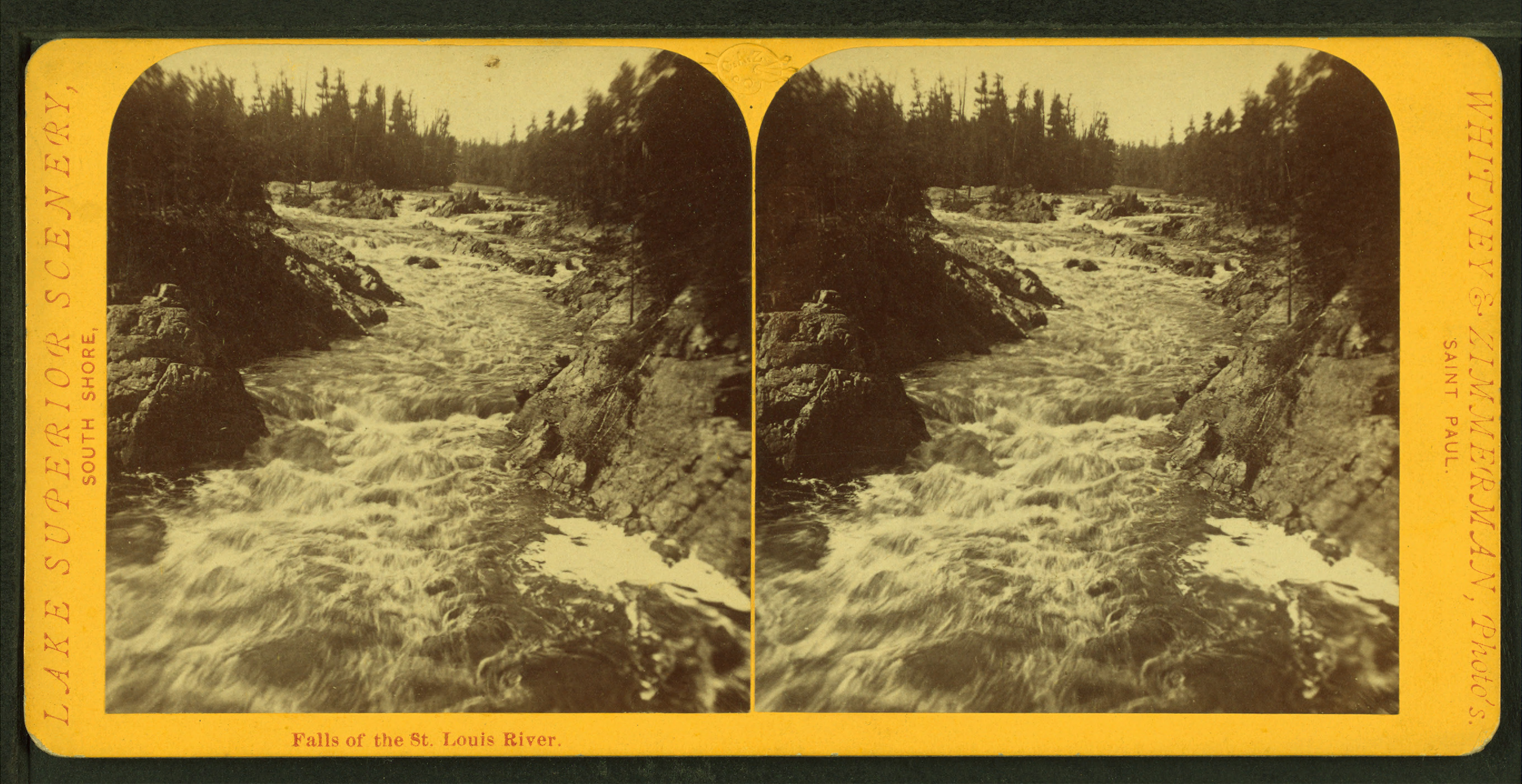
Falls of the St. Louis River, by Whitney & Zimmerman

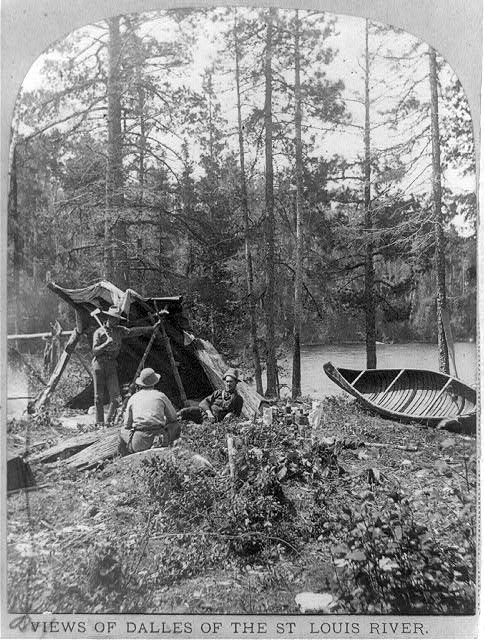
Loggers at Dalles of the Saint Louis River

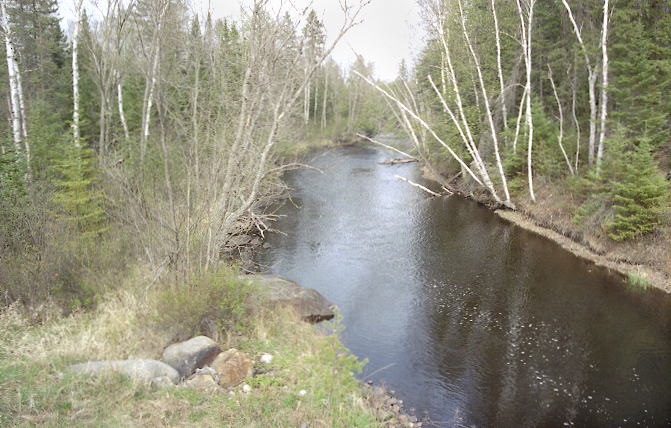
The Saint Louis River in its upper course in the Superior National Forest, near Hoyt Lakes, Minnesota
