= Sandy Township, St. Louis County, Minnesota =

Sandy Township, Minnesota
- Township
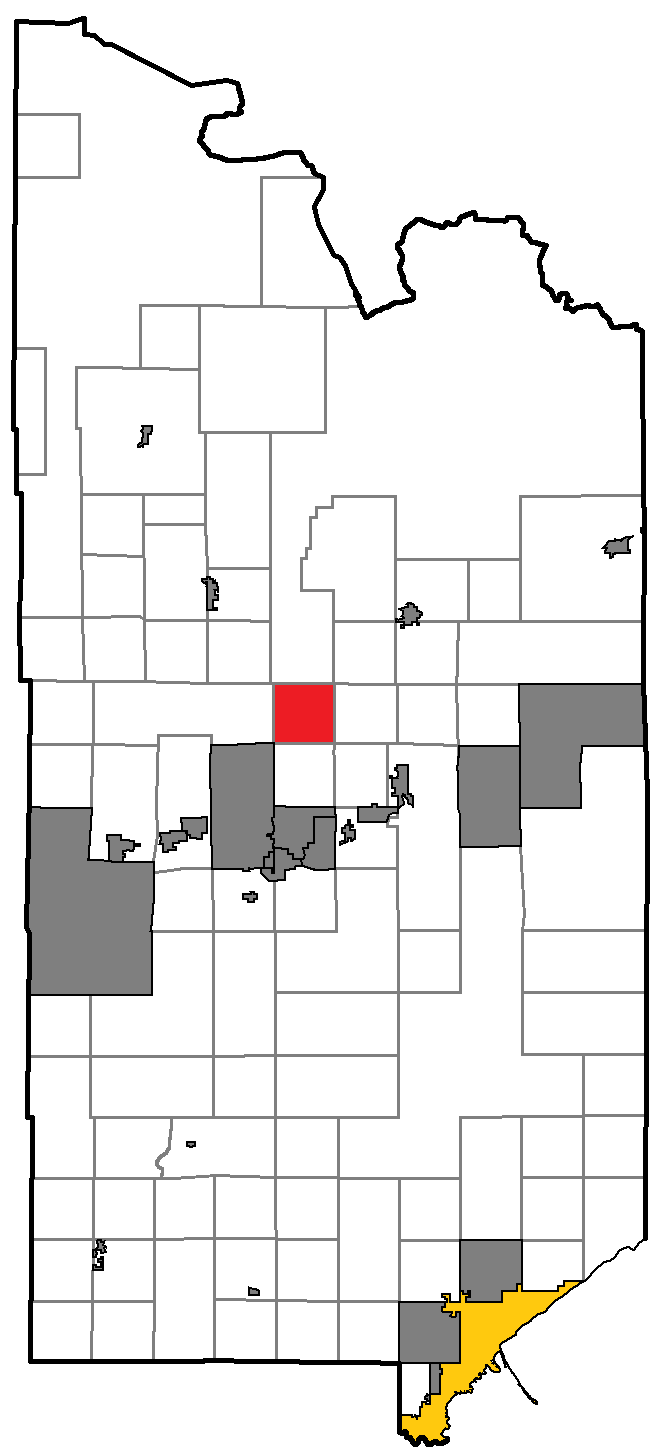
- Location of Sandy Township within St. Louis County, Minnesota
- Coordinates: 47°39′57″N 92°30′24″W
- Country: United States
- State: Minnesota
- County: Saint Louis

Area
  - Total: 33.6 sq mi (86.9 km^{2})
  - Land: 30.2 sq mi (78.3 km^{2})
  - Water: 3.3 sq mi (8.6 km^{2})
- Elevation: 1,496 ft (456 m)

Population (2020)
  - Total: 338
  - Density: 11.2/sq mi (4.32/km^{2})
- Time zone: UTC-6 (Central (CST))
  - Summer (DST): UTC-5 (CDT)
- FIPS code: 27-58450
- GNIS feature ID: 0665549
- Website: https://www.sandytownshipmn.com/

Sandy Township is a township in Saint Louis County, Minnesota, United States. The population was 338 at the 2020 census.

Saint Louis County Road 68, Rice River Road, and Hill Road are three of the main routes in the township.

County 68 and Hill Road both run east–west through the township. Rice River Road runs north–south through the south–central portion of the township. Hulm Road passes through the northwest part of the township.

Sandy Township is located within the unincorporated area of Britt.

== Geography ==
According to the United States Census Bureau, the township has a total area of 33.6 square miles (87 km^{2}); 30.2 square miles (78 km^{2}) is land and 3.3 square miles (8.5 km^{2}), or 9.89%, is water.

Sandy Township is located within the Superior National Forest.

The Rice River, a tributary of the Little Fork River, flows through the northern portion of the township.

Big Rice Lake and Little Rice Lake are both located within the northern portion of Sandy Township.

Britt Creek flows through the southwest part of the township. The Sandy River flows through the southeast part of the township, and the Sandy River also flows near the southwest boundary line of the township.

U.S. Highway 53 and State Highway 169 (MN 169) both run near Sandy Township, north of Virginia.

=== Adjacent townships, cities, and communities ===
The following are adjacent to Sandy Township :

- Wuori Township (south)
- The unincorporated community of Florenton (south)
- Hay Lake Unorganized Territory (southeast)
- Pike Township (east)
- Vermilion Lake Township (northeast)
- Pfeiffer Lake Unorganized Territory (north)
- Angora Township (northwest)
- The unincorporated area of Britt (west)
- Sand Lake Unorganized Territory (west)
- Sandy Lake (southwest)
- The city of Mountain Iron (southwest)

== Demographics ==
As of the census of 2000, there were 382 people, 162 households, and 115 families residing in the township. The population density was 12.6 people per square mile (4.9/km^{2}). There were 170 housing units at an average density of 5.6/sq mi (2.2/km^{2}). The racial makeup of the township was 98.95% White, 0.52% African American, and 0.52% from two or more races. Hispanic or Latino of any race were 0.52% of the population.

There were 162 households, out of which 27.8% had children under the age of 18 living with them, 61.7% were married couples living together, 3.7% had a female householder with no husband present, and 28.4% were non-families. 22.8% of all households were made up of individuals, and 8.0% had someone living alone who was 65 years of age or older. The average household size was 2.36 and the average family size was 2.78.

In the township the population was spread out, with 21.2% under the age of 18, 5.5% from 18 to 24, 28.0% from 25 to 44, 31.7% from 45 to 64, and 13.6% who were 65 years of age or older. The median age was 43 years. For every 100 females, there were 113.4 males. For every 100 females age 18 and over, there were 107.6 males.

The median income for a household in the township was $44,048, and the median income for a family was $46,806. Males had a median income of $44,167 versus $26,563 for females. The per capita income for the township was $20,422. About 1.6% of families and 4.1% of the population were below the poverty line, including none of those under age 18 and 13.7% of those age 65 or over.
