= Kugler Township, St. Louis County, Minnesota =

Kugler Township, Minnesota
- Township
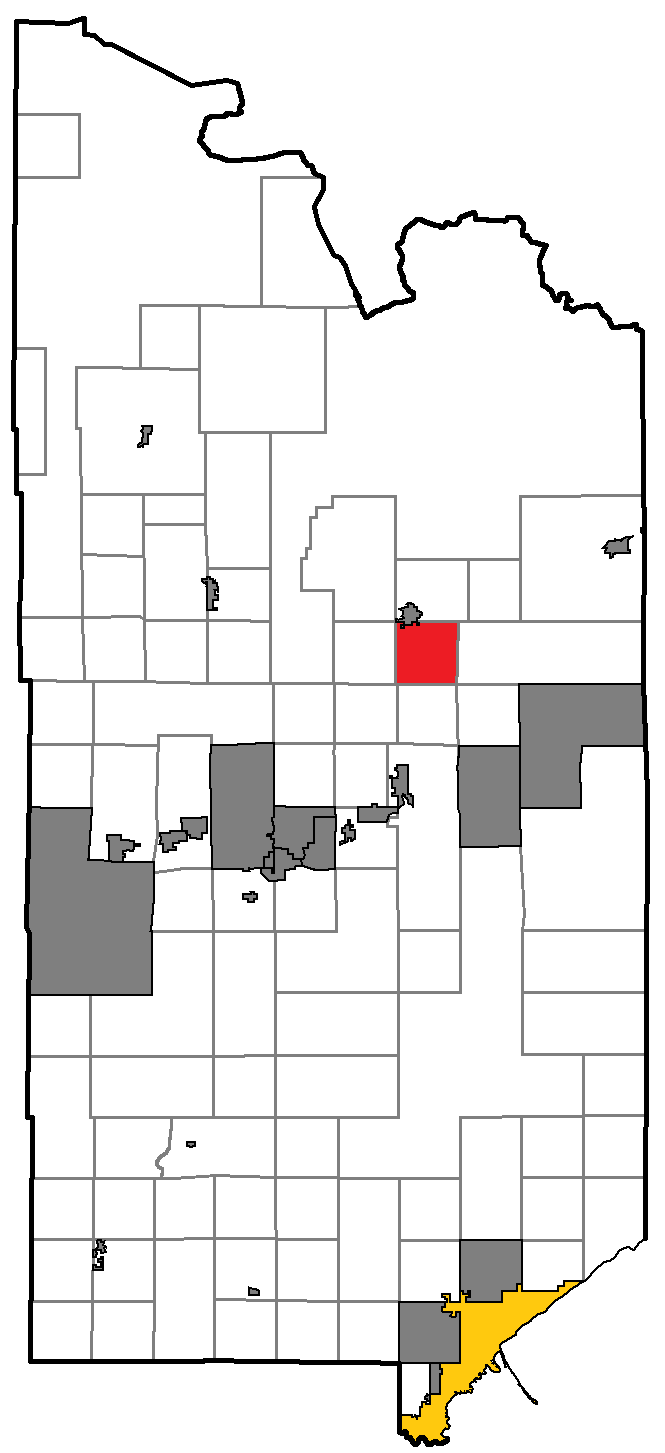
- Location of Kugler Township within St. Louis County, Minnesota
- Coordinates: 47°46′8″N 92°16′12″W
- Country: United States
- State: Minnesota
- County: Saint Louis

Area
  - Total: 35.6 sq mi (92.3 km^{2})
  - Land: 35.4 sq mi (91.6 km^{2})
  - Water: 0.27 sq mi (0.7 km^{2})
- Elevation: 1,483 ft (452 m)

Population (2020)
  - Total: 145
  - Density: 4.10/sq mi (1.58/km^{2})
- Time zone: UTC-6 (Central (CST))
  - Summer (DST): UTC-5 (CDT)
- FIPS code: 27-33794
- GNIS feature ID: 0664648

Kugler Township is a township in Saint Louis County, Minnesota, United States. The population was 145 at the 2020 census.

State Highway 135 (MN 135) serves as a main route in the township. MN 135 runs north–south through the township.

Wahlsten Road (Saint Louis County Road 26) runs east–west through the southern portion of the township.

The unincorporated community of Wahlsten is located within Kugler Township.

== History ==
Kugler Township was named for Fred Kugler, a county official.

== Geography ==
According to the United States Census Bureau, the township has a total area of 35.6 square miles (92 km^{2}); 35.4 square miles (92 km^{2}) is land and 0.3 square miles (0.78 km^{2}), or 0.73%, is water.

Fullers Creek flows through the western portion of Kugler Township. Owens Creek flows through the northeast corner of the township.

The Pike River Recreation Area is located in the southwest corner of the township near the junction of MN 135 and Wahlsten Road.

The Taconite Snowmobile Trail runs north–south through Kugler Township.

=== Adjacent townships, cities, and communities ===
The following are adjacent to Kugler Township :

- The city of Tower (north)
- The unincorporated community of Soudan (north)
- Breitung Township (north)
- Eagles Nest Township (northeast)
- Bear Head Lake State Park (east)
- Bear Island State Forest (east)
- Waasa Township (southeast)
- Embarrass Township (south)
- The unincorporated community of Embarrass (south)
- Pike Township (southwest)
- Vermilion Lake Township (west)
- The unincorporated community of Peyla (west)
- Greenwood Township (northwest)

== Demographics ==
As of the census of 2000, there were 200 people, 71 households, and 51 families residing in the township. The population density was 5.7 inhabitants per square mile (2.2/km^{2}). There were 93 housing units at an average density of 2.6 per square mile (1.0/km^{2}). The racial makeup of the township was 96.50% White, 0.50% Asian, 1.00% Pacific Islander, 1.00% from other races, and 1.00% from two or more races. Hispanic or Latino of any race were 3.50% of the population.

There were 71 households, out of which 40.8% had children under the age of 18 living with them, 63.4% were married couples living together, 2.8% had a female householder with no husband present, and 26.8% were non-families. 21.1% of all households were made up of individuals, and 9.9% had someone living alone who was 65 years of age or older. The average household size was 2.82 and the average family size was 3.25.

In the township the population was spread out, with 26.5% under the age of 18, 10.0% from 18 to 24, 31.0% from 25 to 44, 25.5% from 45 to 64, and 7.0% who were 65 years of age or older. The median age was 39 years. For every 100 females, there were 115.1 males. For every 100 females age 18 and over, there were 122.7 males.

The median income for a household in the township was $44,167, and the median income for a family was $49,063. Males had a median income of $47,750 versus $30,625 for females. The per capita income for the township was $16,601. About 14.0% of families and 12.8% of the population were below the poverty line, including 13.7% of those under the age of eighteen and none of those 65 or over.

== Media ==
The official newspaper of Kugler Township is the Timberjay. The Timberjay is published weekly, with a circulation of over 1000.
