= Breitung Township, St. Louis County, Minnesota =

Breitung Township, Minnesota
- Township
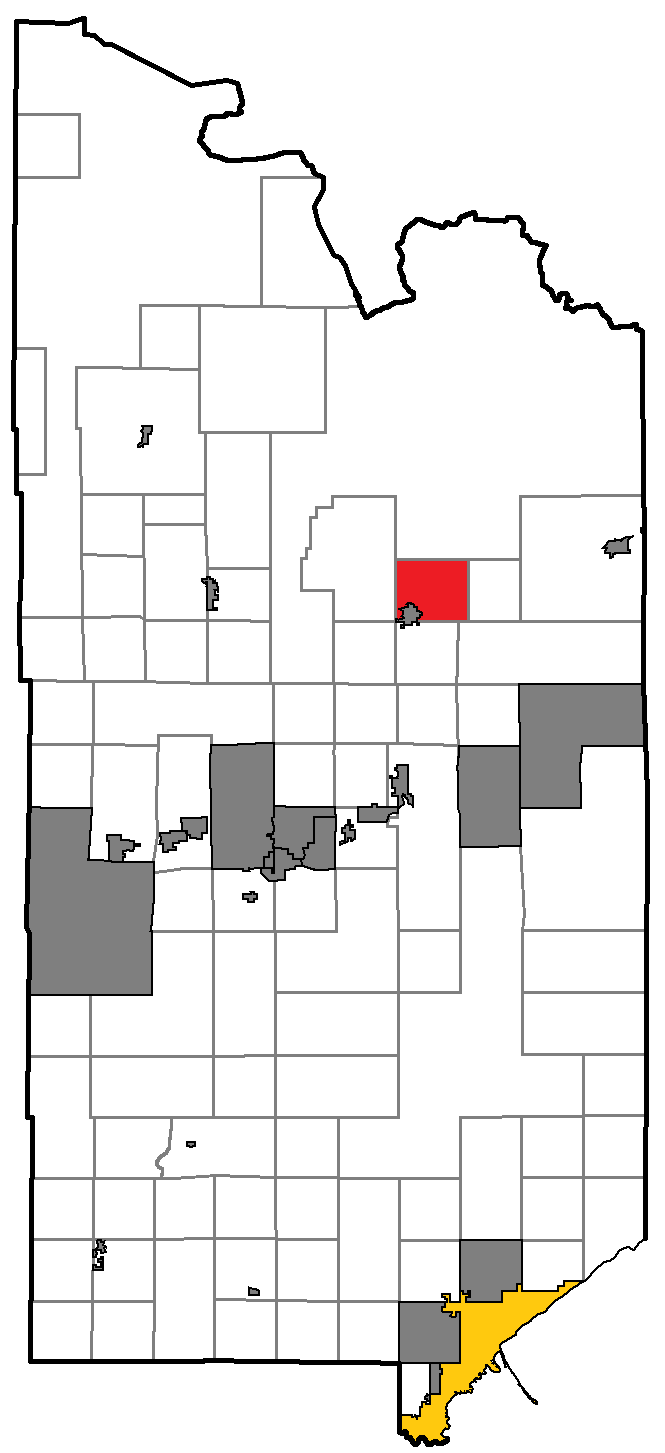
- Location of Breitung Township within St. Louis County
- Coordinates: 47°49′32″N 92°14′16″W
- Country: United States
- State: Minnesota
- County: Saint Louis

Area
  - Total: 38.8 sq mi (100.6 km^{2})
  - Land: 23.0 sq mi (59.6 km^{2})
  - Water: 15.9 sq mi (41.1 km^{2})
- Elevation: 1,358 ft (414 m)

Population (2020)
  - Total: 530
  - Density: 23/sq mi (8.9/km^{2})
- Time zone: UTC-6 (Central (CST))
  - Summer (DST): UTC-5 (CDT)
- FIPS code: 27-07534
- GNIS feature ID: 0663660
- Website: https://breitungtownshipmn.gov/

Breitung Township is a township in Saint Louis County, Minnesota, United States. The population was 530 at the 2020 census.

State Highway 1 (MN 1) and State Highway 169 (MN 169) serve as the main route in the township. The unincorporated community of Soudan is located within Breitung Township. Breitung Township is located along part of Lake Vermilion. The city of Tower is nearby.

== History ==
The township is named after Edward Breitung, who was a miner from Michigan and a former U.S. Representative from that state; in the 1880s, he helped to develop the Soudan Mine in the township. Soudan Underground Mine State Park is located within Breitung Township.

== Geography ==
According to the United States Census Bureau, the township has a total area of 38.8 square miles (100 km^{2}); 23.0 square miles (60 km^{2}) is land and 15.9 square miles (41 km^{2}), or 40.80%, is water.

Stuntz Bay, Armstrong Bay, Bass Bay, and Canfield Portage Bay of Lake Vermilion are located within Breitung Township.

=== Adjacent townships, cities, and communities ===
The following are adjacent to Breitung Township :

- The city of Tower (west)
- Greenwood Township (west)
- Fortune Bay (west)
- Eagles Nest Township (east)
- Bear Head Lake State Park (east-southeast)
- Bear Island State Forest (southeast)
- Kugler Township (south)
- Vermilion Lake Township (southwest)
- The unincorporated community of Peyla (southwest)

=== Census-designated place (CDP) ===
- Soudan – Unincorporated community

== Demographics ==
As of the census of 2000, there were 662 people, 292 households, and 190 families residing in the township. The population density was 28.8 inhabitants per square mile (11.1/km^{2}). There were 523 housing units at an average density of 22.7 per square mile (8.8/km^{2}). The racial makeup of the township was 97.89% White, 0.45% African American, 0.76% Native American, 0.30% Asian, 0.15% from other races, and 0.45% from two or more races. Hispanic or Latino of any race were 0.45% of the population.

There were 292 households, out of which 21.9% had children under the age of 18 living with them, 54.8% were married couples living together, 5.8% had a female householder with no husband present, and 34.6% were non-families. 29.1% of all households were made up of individuals, and 15.4% had someone living alone who was 65 years of age or older. The average household size was 2.22 and the average family size was 2.75.

In the township the population was spread out, with 20.1% under the age of 18, 4.7% from 18 to 24, 24.3% from 25 to 44, 28.9% from 45 to 64, and 22.1% who were 65 years of age or older. The median age was 46 years. For every 100 females, there were 110.8 males. For every 100 females age 18 and over, there were 110.8 males.

The median income for a household in the township was $40,750, and the median income for a family was $51,250. Males had a median income of $40,000 versus $29,107 for females. The per capita income for the township was $20,134. About 10.9% of families and 17.3% of the population were below the poverty line, including 31.5% of those under age 18 and 7.6% of those age 65 or over.
