= Eagles Nest Township, St. Louis County, Minnesota =

Eagles Nest Township, Minnesota
- Township
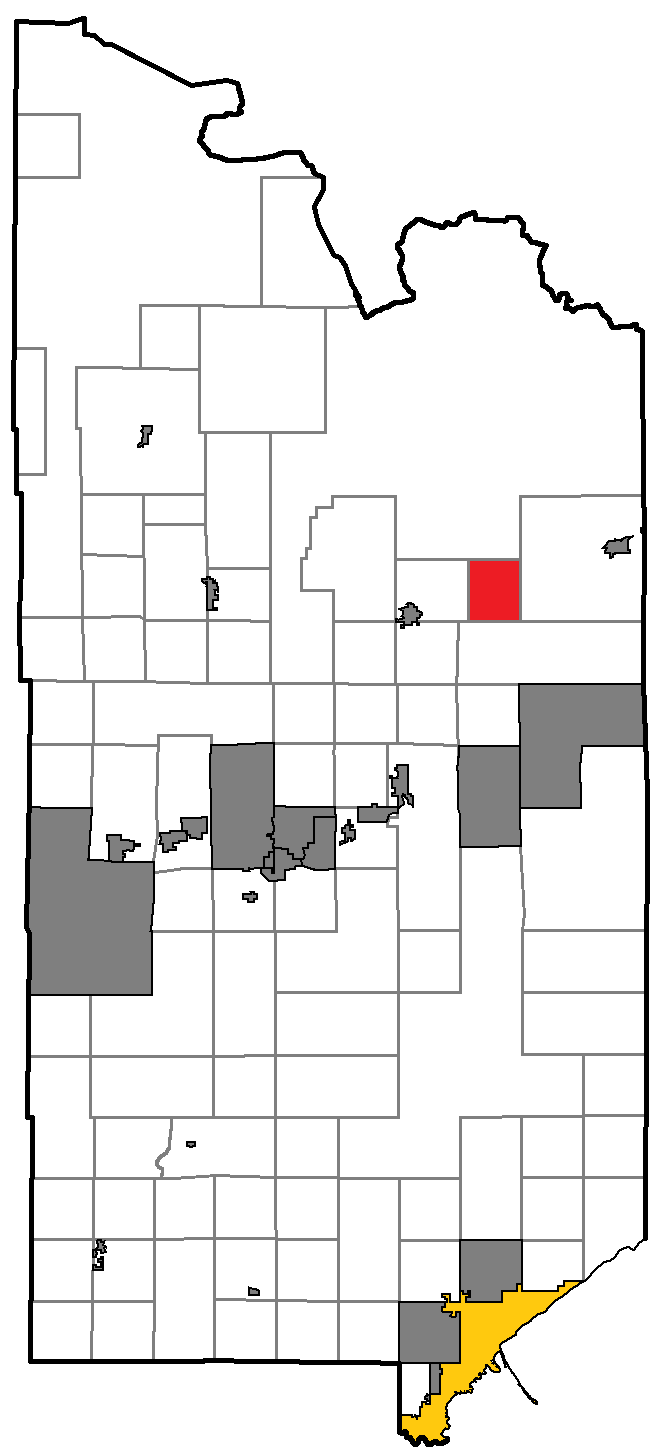
- Location of Eagles Nest Township within St. Louis County, Minnesota
- Coordinates: 47°50′29″N 92°6′10″W
- Country: United States
- State: Minnesota
- County: Saint Louis

Area
  - Total: 29.9 sq mi (77.5 km^{2})
  - Land: 25.2 sq mi (65.2 km^{2})
  - Water: 4.7 sq mi (12.3 km^{2})
- Elevation: 1,467 ft (447 m)

Population (2020)
  - Total: 226
  - Density: 8.98/sq mi (3.47/km^{2})
- Time zone: UTC-6 (Central (CST))
  - Summer (DST): UTC-5 (CDT)
- FIPS code: 27-17440
- GNIS feature ID: 1729739
- Website: https://www.eaglesnestmn.gov/

Eagles Nest Township is a township in Saint Louis County, Minnesota, United States. The population was 226 at the 2020 census.

State Highway 1 (MN 1) and State Highway 169 (MN 169) serve as the main route in the township.

The unincorporated community of McComber is located within Eagles Nest Township.

Bear Head Lake State Park is located in the southeast portion of the township.

== Geography ==
According to the United States Census Bureau, the township has a total area of 29.9 square miles (77 km^{2}); 25.2 square miles (65 km^{2}) is land and 4.7 square miles (12 km^{2}), or 15.85%, is water.

The Armstrong River flows through the central portion of Eagles Nest Township.

Mud Creek flows through the northern portion of the township.

=== Adjacent townships and communities ===
The following are adjacent to Eagles Nest Township :

- Breitung Township (west)
- The unincorporated community of Soudan (west)
- Morse Township (east and northeast)
- Bear Island State Forest (east and south)
- Kugler Township (southwest)

The city of Tower is nearby to the west-southwest, but does not border the township.

The city of Ely is nearby to the east-northeast, but does not border the township.

=== Unincorporated communities ===
- McComber

== Demographics ==
At the 2000 census there were 169 people, 88 households, and 57 families living in the township. The population density was 6.7 people per square mile (2.6/km^{2}). There were 350 housing units at an average density of 13.9/sq mi (5.4/km^{2}). The racial makeup of the township was 100.00% White. Of the 88 households 9.1% had children under the age of 18 living with them, 62.5% were married couples living together, 1.1% had a female householder with no husband present, and 35.2% were non-families. 30.7% of households were one person and 17.0% were one person aged 65 or older. The average household size was 1.92 and the average family size was 2.33.

The age distribution was 8.9% under the age of 18, 2.4% from 18 to 24, 9.5% from 25 to 44, 51.5% from 45 to 64, and 27.8% 65 or older. The median age was 57 years. For every 100 females, there were 87.8 males. For every 100 females age 18 and over, there were 87.8 males.

The median household income was $36,250 and the median family income was $39,167. Males had a median income of $31,750 versus $26,250 for females. The per capita income for the township was $19,568. About 8.1% of families and 8.6% of the population were below the poverty line, including 8.0% of those under the age of eighteen and 4.2% of those sixty-five or over.

== Media ==
The official newspaper of Eagles Nest Township is The Timberjay. The Timberjay is published weekly, with a circulation of over 1000.
