= Pike Township, Minnesota =

- Township
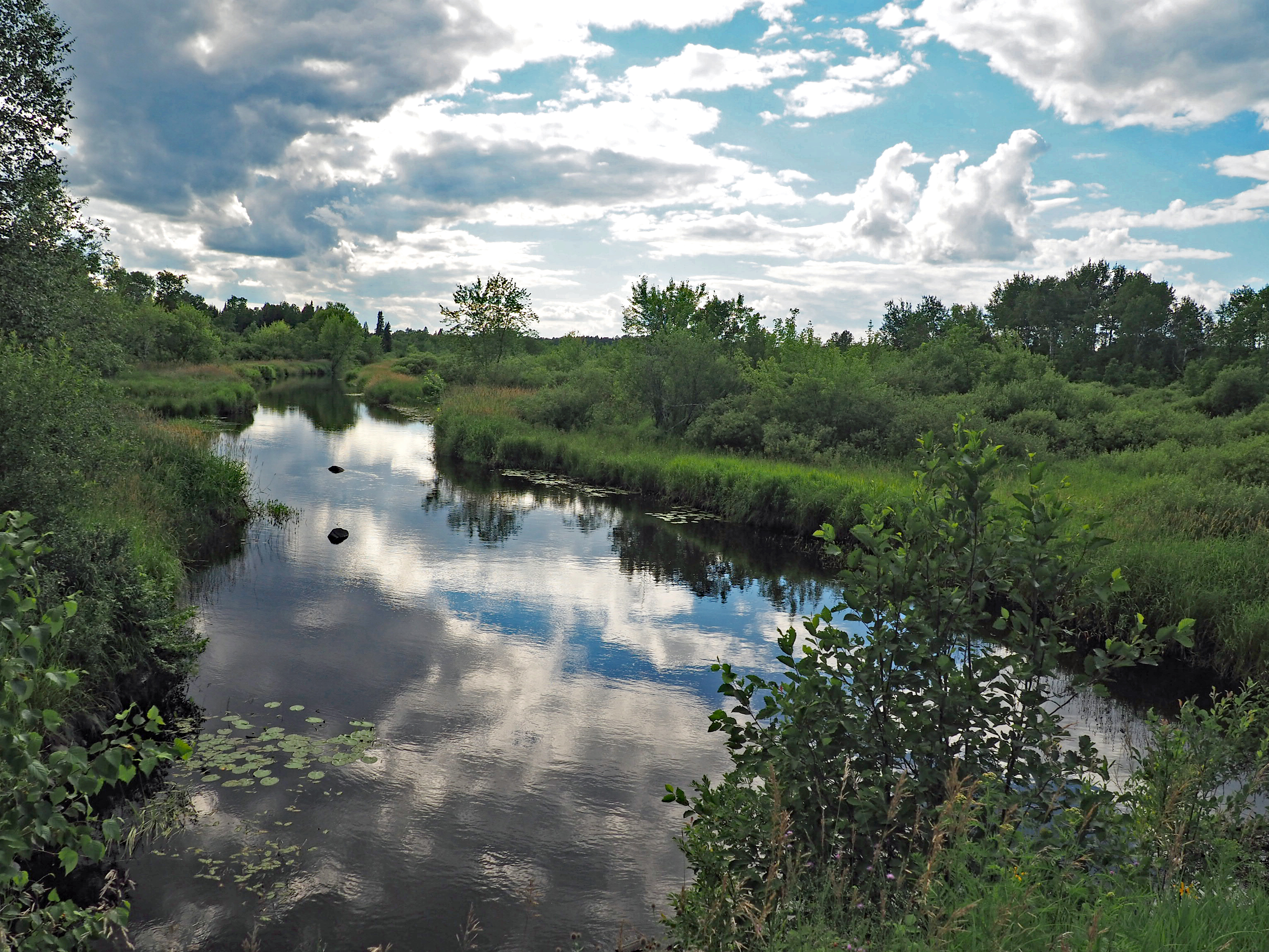
- The Pike River in Pike River Township

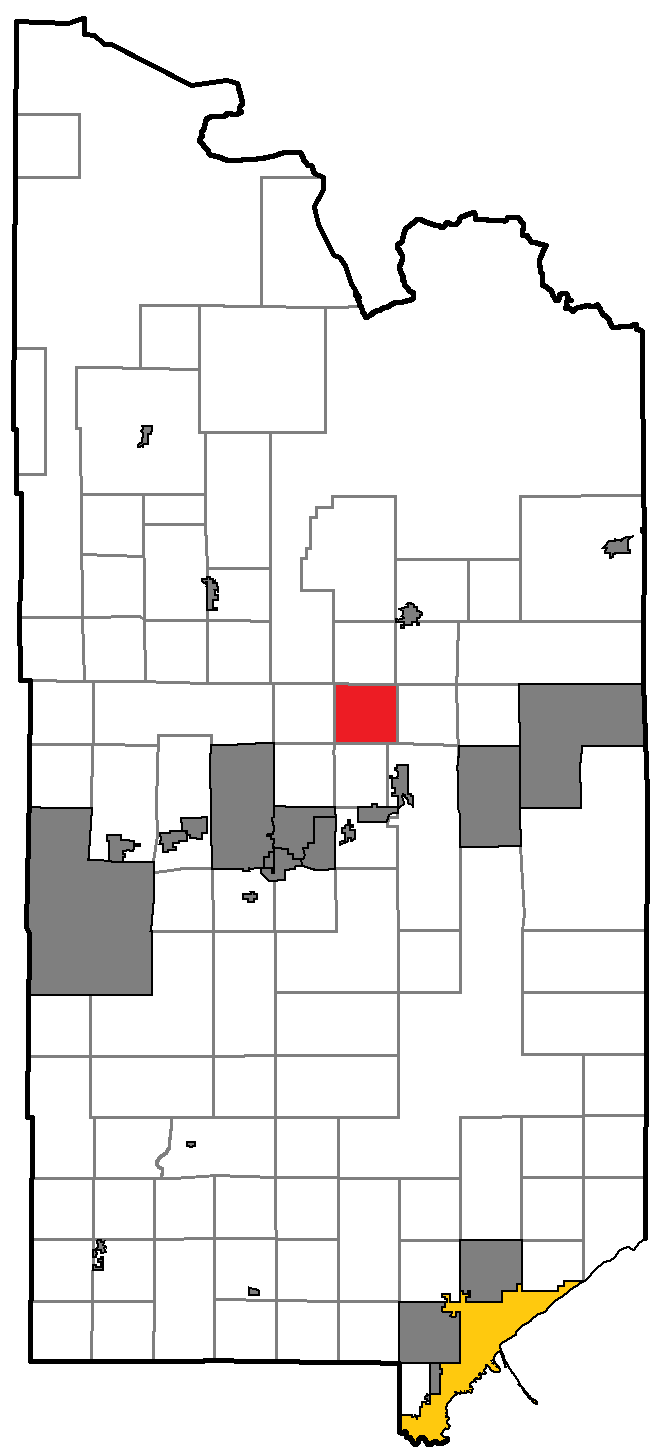
- Location of Pike Township within St. Louis County, Minnesota
- Coordinates: 47°39′27″N 92°22′46″W
- Country: United States
- State: Minnesota
- County: Saint Louis

Area
  - Total: 33.6 sq mi (87.1 km^{2})
  - Land: 33.6 sq mi (87.0 km^{2})
  - Water: 0.039 sq mi (0.1 km^{2})
- Elevation: 1,470 ft (448 m)

Population (2020)
  - Total: 386
  - Density: 11.5/sq mi (4.44/km^{2})
- Time zone: UTC-6 (Central (CST))
  - Summer (DST): UTC-5 (CDT)
- FIPS code: 27-50830
- GNIS feature ID: 0665294

Pike Township is a township in Saint Louis County, Minnesota, United States. The population was 386 at the 2020 census.

State Highway 169 (MN 169) and Saint Louis County Highway 21 (CR 21) are two of the main routes in the township. MN 169 runs north–south, and CR 21 runs east–west. Other routes include Taylor Road.

The town is named for the Pike River, which is in turn named for the fish.

== Geography ==
According to the United States Census Bureau, the township has a total area of 33.6 square miles (87 km^{2}); 0.04 square miles (0.10 km^{2}), or 0.09%, is water.

The Pike River flows through the northeast portion of Pike Township, and the Pike River also flows through the southern portion of the township.

=== Adjacent townships, cities, and communities ===
The following are adjacent to Pike Township :

- Sandy Township (west)
- The unincorporated community of Angora (northwest)
- Pfeiffer Lake Unorganized Territory (northwest)
- Vermilion Lake Township (north)
- Kugler Township (northeast)
- Embarrass Township (east)
- The unincorporated community of Embarrass (east)
- White Township (southeast)
- Hay Lake Unorganized Territory (south)
- The city of Biwabik (south)
- Wuori Township (southwest)
- The unincorporated community of Florenton (southwest)

== Demographics ==
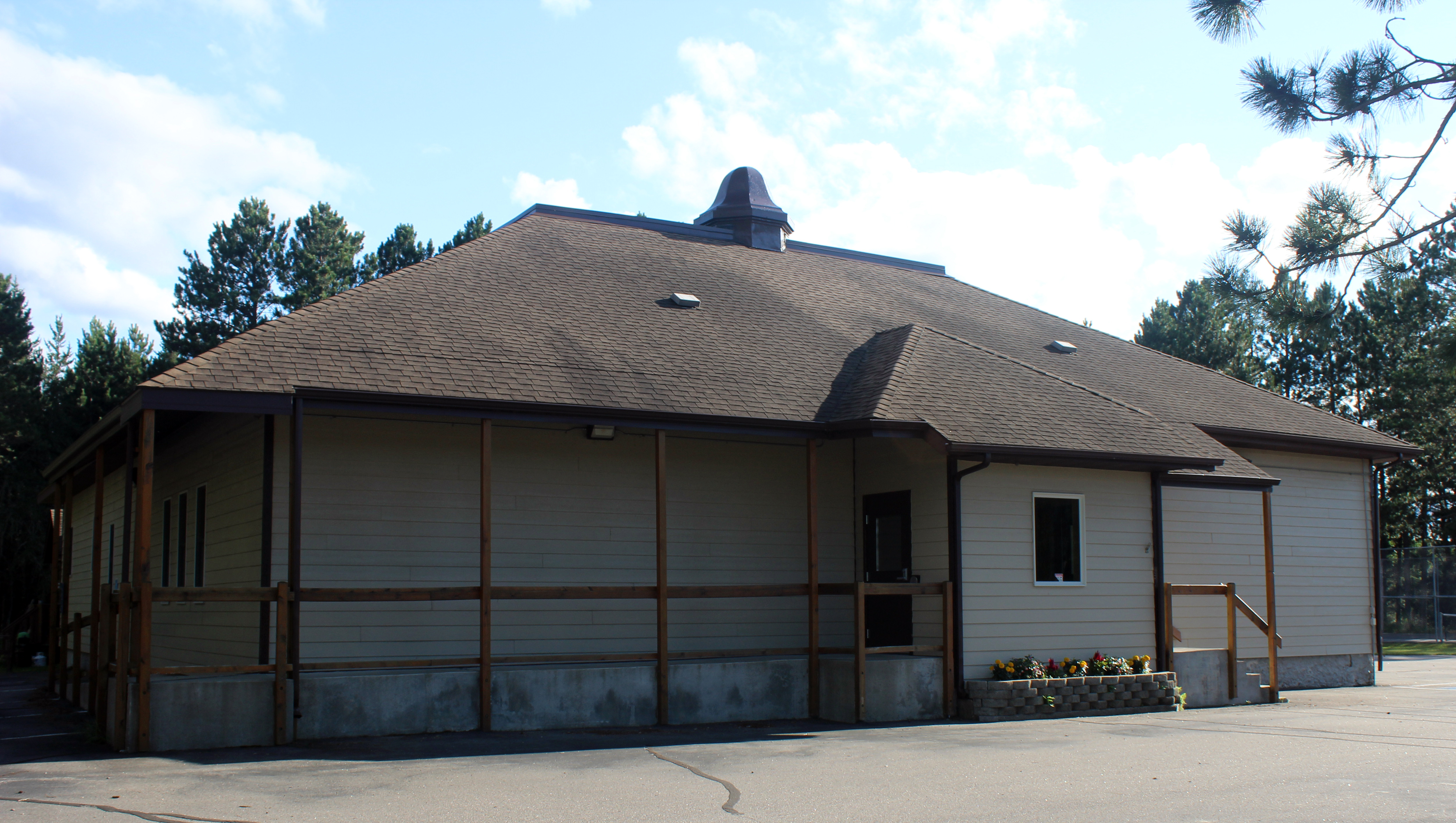
Pike Town Hall

At the 2000 census there were 492 people, 194 households, and 142 families living in the township. The population density was 14.6 people per square mile (5.7/km^{2}). There were 217 housing units at an average density of 6.5/sq mi (2.5/km^{2}). The racial makeup of the township was 98.37% White, 0.81% Native American, 0.41% Asian, 0.41% from other races. Hispanic or Latino of any race were 0.41%.

Of the 194 households 29.9% had children under the age of 18 living with them, 65.5% were married couples living together, 4.1% had a female householder with no husband present, and 26.3% were non-families. 22.7% of households were one person and 4.6% were one person aged 65 or older. The average household size was 2.54 and the average family size was 2.97.

The age distribution was 25.4% under the age of 18, 6.1% from 18 to 24, 25.4% from 25 to 44, 34.6% from 45 to 64, and 8.5% 65 or older. The median age was 42 years. For every 100 females, there were 111.2 males. For every 100 females age 18 and over, there were 118.5 males.

The median household income was $41,346 and the median family income was $44,500. Males had a median income of $38,333 versus $22,375 for females. The per capita income for the township was $19,701. About 5.6% of families and 8.1% of the population were below the poverty line, including 13.7% of those under age 18 and 5.4% of those age 65 or over.
