= McComber, Minnesota =

Unincorporated community in Minnesota, United States

McComber
- Unincorporated community
- Location within Minnesota Location within the United States
- Coordinates: 47°50′56″N 92°03′56″W
- Country: United States
- State: Minnesota
- County: Saint Louis
- Township: Eagles Nest Township
- Elevation: 1,470 ft (450 m)

Population
  - Total: 30
- Time zone: UTC-6 (Central (CST))
  - Summer (DST): UTC-5 (CDT)
- ZIP code: 55731
- Area code: 218
- GNIS feature ID: 661886

McComber is an unincorporated community in Eagles Nest Township, Saint Louis County, Minnesota, United States.

The community is located between Tower and Ely on State Highway 1 (MN 1) and State Highway 169 (MN 169).

The unincorporated community was first founded in 1968 by J.T. Farland.

Bear Head Lake State Park is nearby.

McComber is location of the former McComber iron mine which was located on the north side of Armstrong Lake.

The boundary line between Eagles Nest Township and Morse Township is also in the vicinity.
