= Vermilion Lake Township, St. Louis County, Minnesota =

Vermilion Lake Township, Minnesota
- Township
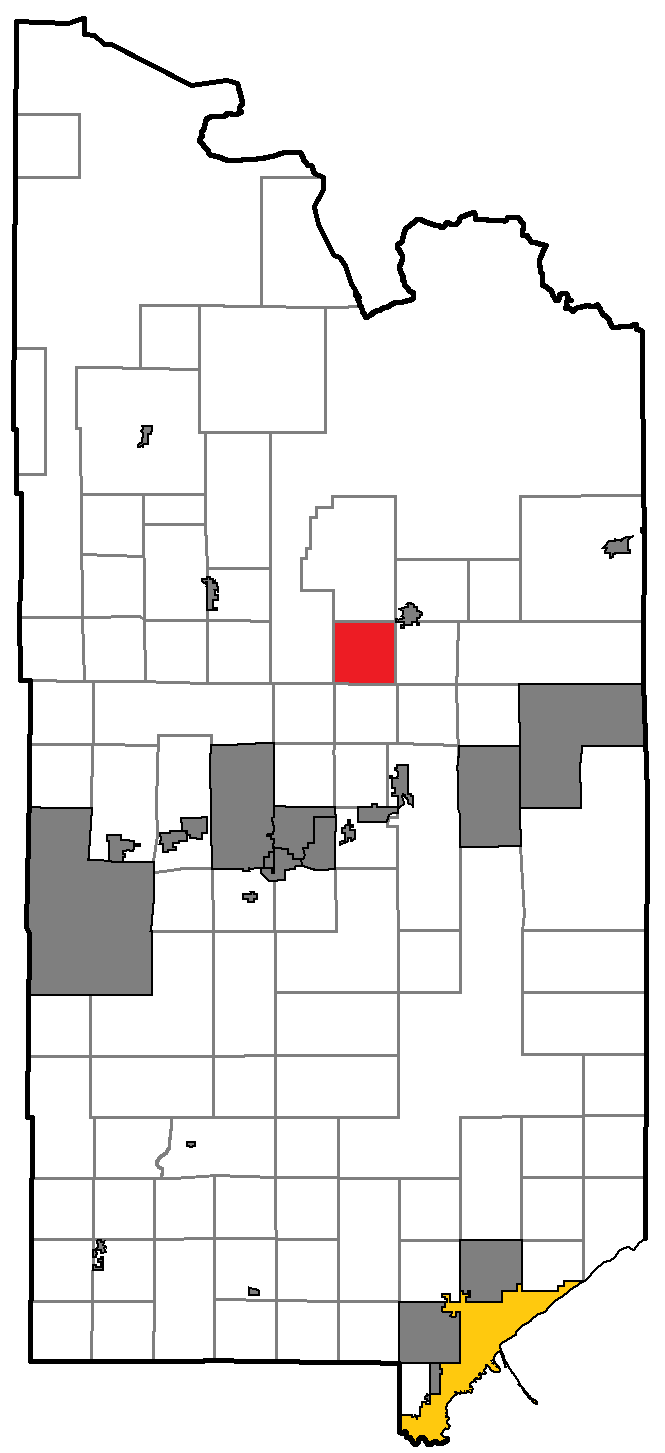
- Location of Vermilion Lake Township within St. Louis County, Minnesota
- Coordinates: 47°46′52″N 92°22′22″W
- Country: United States
- State: Minnesota
- County: Saint Louis

Area
  - Total: 36.6 sq mi (94.8 km^{2})
  - Land: 35.8 sq mi (92.6 km^{2})
  - Water: 0.85 sq mi (2.2 km^{2})
- Elevation: 1,388 ft (423 m)

Population (2020)
  - Total: 265
  - Density: 7.41/sq mi (2.86/km^{2})
- Time zone: UTC-6 (Central (CST))
  - Summer (DST): UTC-5 (CDT)
- FIPS code: 27-66784
- GNIS feature ID: 0665858
- Website: https://vermilionlaketwp.org/

Vermilion Lake Township is a township in Saint Louis County, Minnesota, United States. The population was 265 at the 2020 census.

State Highways 1 (MN 1) and 169 (MN 169) are two of the main routes in the township.

The unincorporated community of Peyla is located within Vermilion Lake Township.

The town's name is a translation of the Ojibwe name for Lake Vermilion, Onamuni.

== Geography ==
According to the United States Census Bureau, the township has a total area of 36.6 square miles (95 km^{2}); 35.8 square miles (93 km^{2}) is land and 0.8 square miles (2.1 km^{2}), or 2.27%, is water.

The Pike Bay of Lake Vermilion is located along the northeast corner of Vermilion Lake Township.

Lake Vermilion is located north of Vermilion Lake Township; the lake is located partially within adjacent Greenwood Township to the north.

The Pike River flows through Vermilion Lake Township. Lehtinen Creek flows through the northwest part of the township.

=== Adjacent townships, cities, and communities ===
The following are adjacent to Vermilion Lake Township :

- Greenwood Township (north)
- The city of Tower (northeast)
- The unincorporated community of Soudan (northeast)
- Breitung Township (northeast)
- Kugler Township (east)
- Embarrass Township (southeast)
- The unincorporated community of Embarrass (southeast)
- Pike Township (south)
- Sandy Township (southwest)
- Pfeiffer Lake Unorganized Territory (west)
- The unincorporated community of Angora (west)

State Highway 1 (MN 1) runs east–west through the northern portion of the township.

State Highway 169 (MN 169) runs north–south through the middle of the township. Highway 169 changes direction to east–west at its junction with Highway 1 and Angus Road. Highway 169 continues concurrently with Highway 1 to nearby Tower.

Angus Road (Saint Louis County Road 77) briefly enters the north–central part of the township, near its intersection with Highways 1 and 169 at Peyla, near Fortune Bay.

Wahlsten Road (Saint Louis County Road 26) runs east–west through the southern portion of the township.

=== Unincorporated communities ===
- Peyla

== Demographics ==
As of the census of 2000, there were 326 people, 133 households, and 100 families residing in the township. The population density was 9.1 people per square mile (3.5/km^{2}). There were 219 housing units at an average density of 6.1/sq mi (2.4/km^{2}). The racial makeup of the township was 99.08% White, 0.31% Native American, and 0.61% from two or more races. 42.6% were of Finnish, 11.5% German, 7.4% Norwegian, 6.4% English, 6.1% Irish and 5.4% Swedish ancestry according to Census 2000.

There were 133 households, out of which 24.8% had children under the age of 18 living with them, 70.7% were married couples living together, 4.5% had a female householder with no husband present, and 24.1% were non-families. 20.3% of all households were made up of individuals, and 6.8% had someone living alone who was 65 years of age or older. The average household size was 2.45 and the average family size was 2.80.

In the township the population was spread out, with 21.2% under the age of 18, 5.2% from 18 to 24, 20.2% from 25 to 44, 44.2% from 45 to 64, and 9.2% who were 65 years of age or older. The median age was 46 years. For every 100 females, there were 103.8 males. For every 100 females age 18 and over, there were 112.4 males.

The median income for a household in the township was $51,875, and the median income for a family was $55,625. Males had a median income of $45,069 versus $23,750 for females. The per capita income for the township was $19,855. None of the families and 2.4% of the population were living below the poverty line, including no under eighteens and 2.9% of those over 64.

== Media ==
The official newspaper of Vermilion Lake is the Timberjay. The Timberjay is published weekly, with a circulation of over 1000.
