= Bear Island Lake =

Lake in the state of Minnesota, United States

- Location within Minnesota
- Location: Birch Lake, St. Louis County, Minnesota, U.S.
- Coordinates: 47°46′24″N 91°58′46″W
- Primary inflows: Beaver River
- Primary outflows: Bear Island River
- Basin countries: United States
- Max. length: 4 mi (6.4 km)
- Max. width: 2 mi (3.2 km)
- Surface area: 2,351 acres (9.51 km^{2})
- Islands: 23
- Settlements: Rothman, Babbitt

Bear Island Lake is a lake which is about 15 miles (24 km) southwest of Ely in the U.S. state of Minnesota. The lake measures 2,351 acres (9.51 km^{2}), or about 2 miles (3.2 km) by 4 miles (6.4 km). There are at least 20 other islands in the lake. The shoreline of the natural glacial lake is about two-thirds state and national forest, including Bear Island State Forest. While deep in parts, several shallow bays and natural sand beaches make it a popular swimming spot.

== Fishing ==
The lake is a naturally self-sustaining lake and includes a large variety of fish, such as walleye, northern pike, smallmouth bass, largemouth bass, crappie, bluegill, sunfish, pumpkinseed and perch. The major inlet for Bear Island Lake is the Beaver River, which has rapids and beaver dams that limit fish movement. The lake's major outlet is Bear Island River, which has an old dam that also limits fish movement at low water. Aquatic plants grow to a depth of 7 feet (2.1 m) and are sparse along most of the shoreline of Bear Island Lake.

== Skiing ==
The Bear Island Ski Trail contains 10 miles (16 km) of groomed cross country trails. This two-section trail system winds through Superior National Forest, with a picnic rock along the trail to Perch Lake, and another section that follows the shoreline of Bear Island Lake.

== Other places ==
Another nearby lake is called Bear Head Lake and is part of Bear Head Lake State Park, along with Big Island, which is in nearby Eagles Nest Lake, which is actually three separate lakes named No. 1, No. 2 and No. 3. Farther north, along the Canada–US border, is Round Bear Island, which is in Kabetogama Lake and is part of Voyageurs National Park.

== See also ==
- List of lakes in Minnesota
- List of islands in the United States
