= Greenwood Township, St. Louis County, Minnesota =

Greenwood Township, Minnesota
- Township
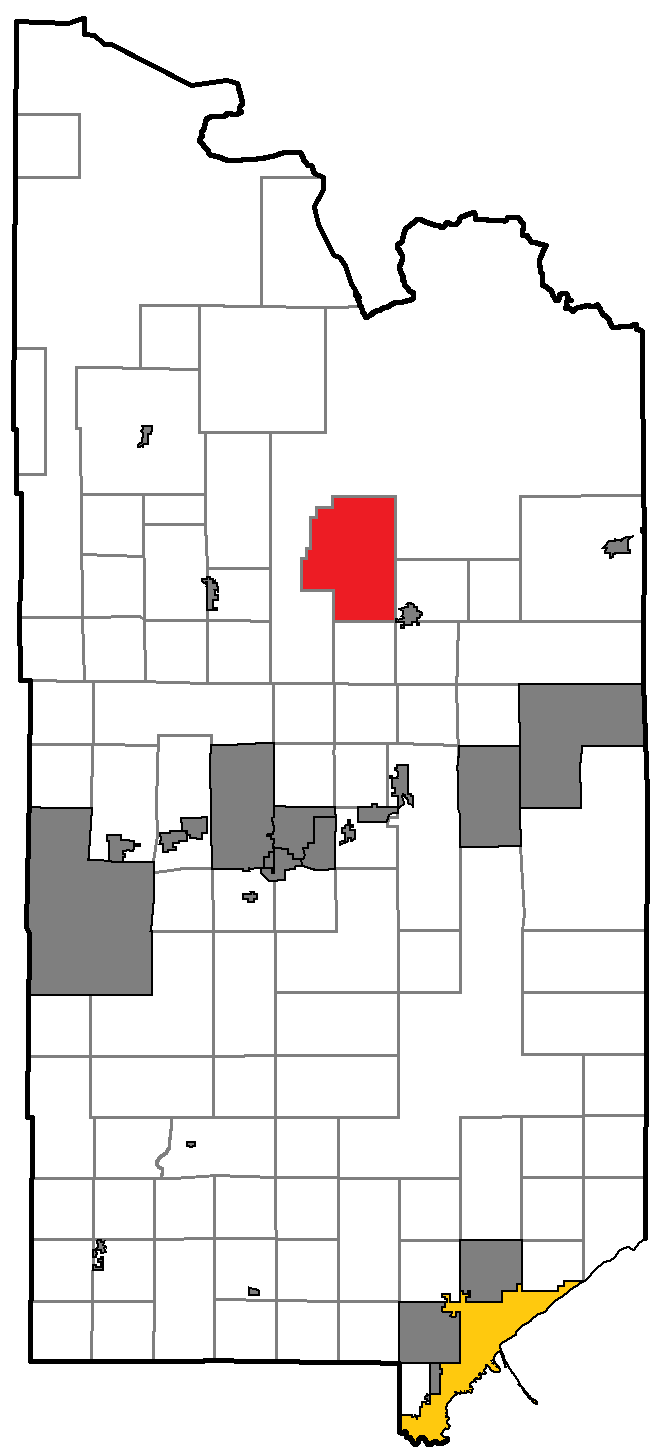
- Location of Greenwood Township within St. Louis County, Minnesota
- Coordinates: 47°52′14″N 92°22′58″W
- Country: United States
- State: Minnesota
- County: Saint Louis

Area
  - Total: 92.2 sq mi (238.9 km^{2})
  - Land: 58.2 sq mi (150.7 km^{2})
  - Water: 34.1 sq mi (88.3 km^{2})
- Elevation: 1,371 ft (418 m)

Population (2020)
  - Total: 1,041
  - Density: 17.89/sq mi (6.908/km^{2})
- Time zone: UTC-6 (Central (CST))
  - Summer (DST): UTC-5 (CDT)
- FIPS code: 27-25928
- GNIS feature ID: 0664351
- Website: greenwoodtownshipmn.com

Greenwood Township is a township in Saint Louis County, Minnesota, United States. The population was 1,041 at the 2020 census.

Saint Louis County Roads 77 and 115 are two of the main routes in the township.

Greenwood Township is located along part of Lake Vermilion. The city of Tower is located immediately east-southeast of the township.

== Geography ==
According to the United States Census Bureau, the township has a total area of 92.3 square miles (239 km^{2}); 58.2 square miles (151 km^{2}) is land and 34.1 square miles (88 km^{2}), or 36.94%, is water.

The Lake Vermilion Indian Reservation is located in the southeast part of Greenwood Township. Fortune Bay Resort Casino is located within the township.

The Pike Bay of Lake Vermilion is located along the southeast corner of Greenwood Township.

Everett Bay, Big Bay, Daisy Bay, Greenwood Bay, and Frazer Bay of Lake Vermilion are located within the township.

Little East Creek flows through the northern part of the township. Wolf Creek flows between Wolf Lake and Smart Bay.

Trout Lake is partially located within the township at the northeast edge of the township. The northeast corner of Greenwood Township is located within the Boundary Waters Canoe Area Wilderness. Part of the township is located within the Kabetogama State Forest.

=== Adjacent townships, cities, and communities ===
The following are adjacent to Greenwood Township:

- Breitung Township (east)
- The city of Tower (east-southeast)
- Kugler Township (southeast)
- Vermilion Lake Township (south)
- The unincorporated community of Peyla (south)
- Pfeiffer Lake Unorganized Territory (southwest)
- The unincorporated community of Angora (southwest)
- Northeast Saint Louis Unorganized Territory (west, northwest, north, and northeast)

The city of Cook is also nearby to the west, but does not border the township.

== Demographics ==
As of the census of 2000, there were 905 people, 423 households, and 301 families residing in the township. The population density was 15.6 inhabitants per square mile (6.0/km^{2}). There were 1,611 housing units at an average density of 27.7 per square mile (10.7/km^{2}). The racial makeup of the township was 82.43% White, 0.11% African American, 15.91% Native American, 0.11% Asian, 0.11% Pacific Islander, 0.22% from other races, and 1.10% from two or more races. Hispanic or Latino of any race were 0.22% of the population.

There were 423 households, out of which 11.8% had children under the age of 18 living with them, 65.5% were married couples living together, 3.1% had a female householder with no husband present, and 28.8% were non-families. 24.8% of all households were made up of individuals, and 8.7% had someone living alone who was 65 years of age or older. The average household size was 2.14 and the average family size was 2.48.

In the township the population was spread out, with 14.9% under the age of 18, 3.1% from 18 to 24, 15.0% from 25 to 44, 46.5% from 45 to 64, and 20.4% who were 65 years of age or older. The median age was 53 years. For every 100 females, there were 113.4 males. For every 100 females age 18 and over, there were 108.7 males.

The median income for a household in the township was $47,917, and the median income for a family was $51,944. Males had a median income of $42,500 versus $21,838 for females. The per capita income for the township was $26,433. About 5.1% of families and 9.1% of the population were below the poverty line, including 19.4% of those under age 18 and 1.0% of those age 65 or over.

== Media ==
The official newspaper of Greenwood Township is The Timberjay. The Timberjay is published weekly, with a circulation of over 1000.
