= Crab Lake =

Crab Lake may refer to:

- Crab Lake, Minnesota, an unorganized territory
- Crab Lake (St. Louis County, Minnesota), a lake
