= Hay Lake =

Hay Lake, Hay Lakes or Hays Lake may refer to:

- Hay Lake, Minnesota, an unorganized territory in Minnesota, United States
- Hay Lake 209, an Indian reserve in Alberta, Canada
- Hay Lakes, a village in Alberta, Canada
- Hays Lake, a lake in Minnesota, United States
