= Illgen City, Minnesota =

Unincorporated community in Minnesota, United States

- Unincorporated community
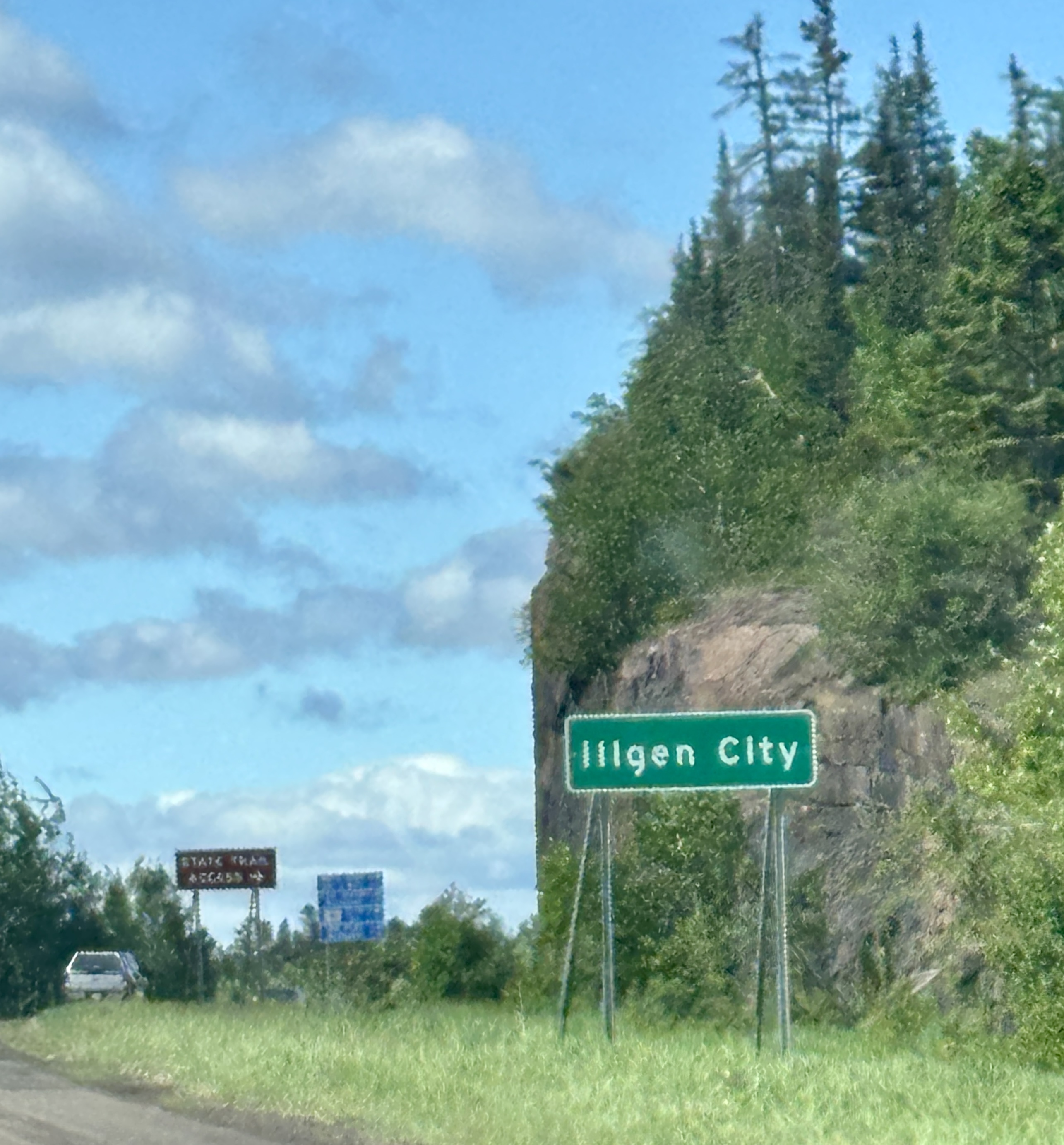
- Road sign on Hwy 61

- Location within Minnesota Location within the United States
- Coordinates: 47°20′49″N 91°11′23″W
- Country: United States
- State: Minnesota
- County: Lake
- Township: Beaver Bay
- Elevation: 738 ft (225 m)

Population
  - Total: 10
- Time zone: UTC-6 (Central (CST))
  - Summer (DST): UTC-5 (CDT)
- Area code: 218
- GNIS feature ID: 654765

Illgen City is an unincorporated community in Beaver Bay Township, Lake County, Minnesota, United States.

The community is located northeast of the city of Silver Bay at the junction of Minnesota Highway 61 and Minnesota Highway 1, on the North Shore of Lake Superior. Illgen City is also located 33 miles northeast of the city of Two Harbors.

Tettegouche State Park, the Baptism River, and the Palisade Head rock formation are all nearby, as is the community of Finland, Minnesota.
