= Breitung Township =

Breitung Township may refer to:

- Breitung Township, Michigan
- Breitung Township, St. Louis County, Minnesota
