= North Dakota Highway 54 =

State highway in North Dakota, U.S.

North Dakota Highway 54

Route information
- Maintained by NDDOT
- Length: 2.263 mi (3.642 km)

Major junctions
- West end: I-29 / CR 19 west of Oslo, MN
- East end: MN 1 at the Minnesota border in Oslo, MN

Location
- Country: United States
- State: North Dakota
- Counties: Walsh

Highway system
- North Dakota State Highway System; Interstate; US; State
← ND 53	→ ND 56

North Dakota Highway 54 (ND 54) is a 2.263-mile-long (3.642 km) east–west state highway in the U.S. state of North Dakota. ND 54's western terminus is at Interstate 29 (I-29) west of Oslo, Minnesota, and the eastern terminus is a continuation as Minnesota Highway 1 (MN 1) at the Minnesota border.

== Route description ==
Highway 54 serves as a short east–west route in northeast North Dakota, connecting Interstate 29 to Minnesota Highway 1. Highway 1 continues east to the cities of Oslo, Minnesota and Warren, Minnesota.

== Major intersections ==
The entire route is in Walsh County.

Location	mi	km	Destinations	Notes
	0.000	0.000	I-29 – Winnipeg, Grand Forks	Western terminus, I-29 Exit 161
	2.263	3.642	MN 1 – Oslo	Continuation into Minnesota
1.000 mi = 1.609 km; 1.000 km = 0.621 mi
