= Wuori =

Wuori may refer to:

== People ==
- Eero A. Wuori, Finnish journalist
- Matti Wuori, Finnish politician

== Places ==
- Wuori Township, St. Louis County, Minnesota, United States
