= Britt, Minnesota =

Britt
- Unincorporated area
- Location within Minnesota Location within the United States
- Coordinates: 47°38′25″N 92°31′32″W
- Country: United States
- State: Minnesota
- County: Saint Louis
- Township: Sandy Township
- Elevation: 1,476 ft (450 m)

Population (2010)
  - Total: 1,069
- Time zone: UTC-6 (Central (CST))
  - Summer (DST): UTC-5 (CDT)
- ZIP code: 55710
- Area code: 218
- GNIS feature ID: 660881

Britt is an unincorporated area in Saint Louis County, Minnesota, 11 miles north of the city of Virginia.

== Geography ==
The area Britt covers begins at Highway 169 near Florenton, extending south towards Wouri Township. It also extends west past U.S. Highway 53 toward Sand Lake.

Saint Louis County Roads 65, 68, and 106 (Britt Bypass) are within the Britt area.

Britt is within the Superior National Forest.

Natural lakes in the area include Lake Fourteen, Lake Leander, Lake Little Fourteen, Dark Lake, Arrowhead Lake, Sand Lake, Little Sand Lake, Sandy Lake, Little Sandy Lake, Moose Lake, Clear Lake, and several smaller lakes.

Britt Creek flows through the area.

== History and culture ==
The original center of Britt was generally considered the intersection of Saint Louis County Road 68 and Jarvinen Road (County 662) in the southwest corner of Sandy Township.

Since the 1950s, a camp site has operated on Arrowhead Lake. This site is now known as Laurentian Environmental Center and is operated by Mounds View Public Schools, a school district in the Twin Cities.

In 1976, Jim Mulligan made a documentary in which he interviewed citizens of Britt about their actions to make the United States Forestry Service stop using the controversial herbicide 2-4-5T, a chemical that created health problems for local animals, people, and vegetation.

Minntac Tailings Basin Cell One in Mountain Iron, Minnesota, also lies partially in southern Britt.
