= Wuori Township, St. Louis County, Minnesota =

Wuori Township, Minnesota
- Township
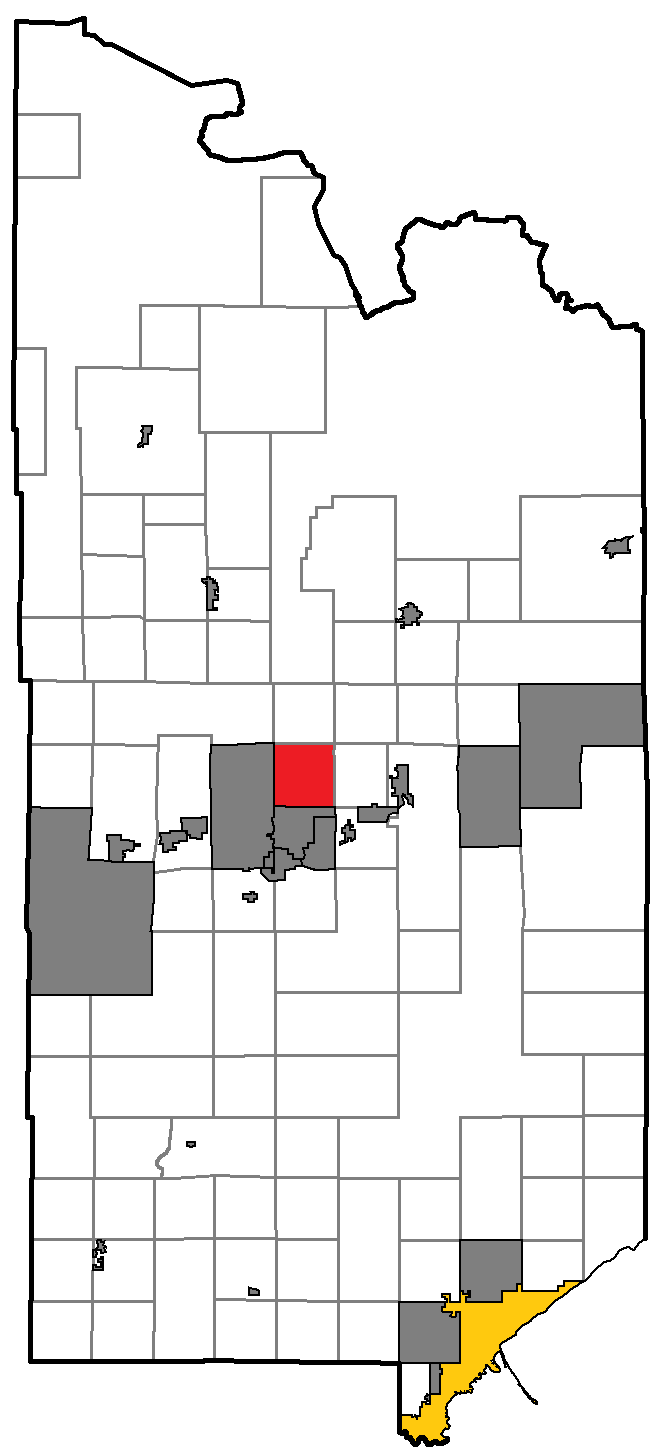
- Location of Wuori Township within St. Louis County, Minnesota
- Coordinates: 47°36′48″N 92°31′28″W
- Country: United States
- State: Minnesota
- County: Saint Louis

Area
  - Total: 34.9 sq mi (90.4 km^{2})
  - Land: 34.7 sq mi (90.0 km^{2})
  - Water: 0.15 sq mi (0.4 km^{2})
- Elevation: 1,539 ft (469 m)

Population (2020)
  - Total: 569
  - Density: 16.4/sq mi (6.32/km^{2})
- Time zone: UTC-6 (Central (CST))
  - Summer (DST): UTC-5 (CDT)
- FIPS code: 27-71869
- GNIS feature ID: 0666058

Wuori Township is a township in Saint Louis County, Minnesota, United States. The population was 569 at the 2020 census.

U.S. Highway 53 and State Highway 169 (MN 169) are two of the main routes in the township.

Wuori Township is immediately north of the city of Virginia.

The unincorporated community of Florenton is in Wuori Township. Britt is nearby.

A majority of Wuori Township is in the Superior National Forest. The Laurentian Continental Divide Recreation Area is in Wuori Township, on Highway 53. The recreation area functions as the trailhead for the Lookout Mountain Trail system.

== Etymology ==
Wuori is from a Finnish word meaning 'mountain'.

== Geography ==
According to the United States Census Bureau, the township has a total area of 34.9 square miles (90 km^{2}), of which 34.8 square miles (90 km^{2}) is land and 0.2 square miles (0.52 km^{2}), or 0.43%, is water.

Wuori Creek flows through the northeast corner of the township.

The Sandy River flows through the north–central part of Wuori Township, and also near the northwest boundary line of the township.

=== Adjacent townships, cities, and communities ===
The following are adjacent to Wuori Township:

- The city of Virginia (south)
- The city of Mountain Iron (west and southwest)
- Sandy Township (north)
- The unincorporated area of Britt (north and northwest)
- Sand Lake Unorganized Territory (northwest)
- Hay Lake Unorganized Territory (east)
- Pike Township (northeast)

=== Unincorporated communities ===
- Florenton

== Demographics ==
As of the census of 2000, there were 563 people, 219 households, and 173 families residing in the township. The population density was 16.2 people per square mile (6.3/km^{2}). There were 231 housing units at an average density of 6.6/sq mi (2.6/km^{2}). The racial makeup of the township was 98.22% White, 0.89% Native American, 0.36% Asian, and 0.53% from two or more races. Hispanic or Latino of any race were 0.71% of the population.

There were 219 households, out of which 33.3% had children under the age of 18 living with them, 68.9% were married couples living together, 7.8% had a female householder with no husband present, and 21.0% were non-families. 16.0% of all households were made up of individuals, and 4.6% had someone living alone who was 65 years of age or older. The average household size was 2.57 and the average family size was 2.91.

The township's population included 22.6% under the age of 18, 9.1% from 18 to 24, 25.0% from 25 to 44, 34.3% from 45 to 64, and 9.1% who were 65 years of age or older. The median age was 42 years. For every 100 females age 18 and over, there were 108.6 males.

The median income for a household in the township was $45,694, and the median income for a family was $50,469. Males had a median income of $41,667 versus $21,528 for females. The per capita income for the township was $19,070. About 3.1% of families and 3.9% of the population were below the poverty line, including 6.7% of those under age 18 and 5.7% of those age 65 or over.
