= Darby Nelson =

American ecologist and author (1940–2022)

Darby Miles Nelson (June 29, 1941 – January 13, 2022) was an American environmentalist, ecologist, politician, author, and educator.

== Personal life ==
Nelson was born in the Iron Range town of Soudan, Minnesota, on June 29, 1941, to F. Miles Nelson and Margaret Gennes Nelson.

He was a competitive cross country skier, and the only person to have skied every Mora, Minnesota version of the Vasaloppet races since its inception in 1973.

Nelson was married for 53 years to Geri, whom he met at the University of Minnesota's Lake Itasca Field Station while both were doing research. He had a son Per, a daughter Robin, and 5 grandchildren. Nelson lived in Champlin, Minnesota with his wife and family. He died from Alzheimer's disease on January 13, 2022, at the age of 81.

== Education, research, and teaching ==
Growing up on the Minnesota River town of Morton, Nelson developed a love of the environment, including ecology, geology and history. In 1962, he canoed with three friends from Lake of the Woods in northern Minnesota to Hudson Bay. He attended the University of Minnesota and received a B.A. in zoology, in 1964, an M.S. in zoology in 1966, and his Ph.D. in zoology in 1970. His Ph.D. research focused on aquatic ecology.

For 35 years Nelson was a teacher of biology and environmental sciences at Anoka Ramsey Community College, where he was selected by students to receive the Golden Chalk Award recognizing faculty excellence. His teaching skill was also recognized with the Minnesota Post-Secondary Science teacher of the year from the Minnesota Academy of Science/Minnesota Science Teachers Association.

== Public service ==
As a three term Democratic elected representative to the Minnesota state legislature from 1983 to 1988, Nelson wrote "bills that created the state's Board of Water and Soils Resources, protected public lands, and even created a funding mechanism for cross-country ski trails."

An early advocate for the wilderness designation of the BWCA, Nelson served with many non-profit organizations, including Friends of the Boundary Waters, Conservation Minnesota, the Nature Conservancy, on the board of the Freshwater Society, and the Lessard-Sams Outdoor Heritage Council, which was created by Minnesota voters in 2008 by the Clean Water, Land and Legacy Amendment.

== Awards and honors ==
In 2021, Nelson received the Alumni Achievement Award from the College of Biological Sciences at the University of Minnesota.

Together with his wife Geri Nelson, Darby Nelson were named "Distinguished Minnesotans" by Bemidji State University in 2016, recognizing "the contributions of current or former residents of the state who have performed exemplary service to the people of Minnesota or the United States. ".

== Publications ==
In addition to a number of publications in Minnesota Conservation Volunteer, Silent Sports, Biocycle, and The Naturalist, Nelson wrote two critically acclaimed natural history books.

His first book, For Love of Lakes. was published in 2011, and describes Nelson's direct observations of the ecological status of a variety of lakes across the US and Canada. It was a finalist for the Minnesota Book Awards in the category of Creative Non-fiction/Memoir in 2012. In the acknowledgements he credits his mother, Margaret Nelson, with inspiring his love of lakes at an early age, and his wife, Geri Nelson for unflagging support, encouragement and assistance in writing the book. Described as "an ode to the beauty of lakes and the high stakes of what we have to lose; it's also an eyes-wide-open cautionary tale of how things are changing for the worse, and what has already been lost." The book tries to explain the paradox of our love of lakes with our destruction of these ecosystems.

His second book, published in 2019, For Love of a River: The Minnesota chronicles travels by canoe with his wife Geri, from the start of the Minnesota River near the South Dakota-Minnesota border to its confluence with the Mississippi river in St. Paul, MN. It covers a wide range of " topics as diverse as geology, early and modern agriculture, citizen advocacy, water-quality challenges and solutions, river-based recreation, dams and dam removal, prairie pothole lakes, the river’s rich diversity of plant and animal life, and the Dakota–US War. Never before has a book undertaken such a holistic exploration of the state’s namesake river and its basin". Writer and filmmaker John Hickman was enlisted by Nelson and his wife to help complete this book as Nelson's cognitive impairment, diagnosed in 2011, progressed to Alzheimer's disease.
