= Shooks, Minnesota =

Unincorporated community in Minnesota, United States

Shooks
- Unincorporated community
- Location within Minnesota Location within the United States
- Coordinates: 47°52′27″N 94°26′18″W
- Country: United States
- State: Minnesota
- County: Beltrami
- Elevation: 1,355 ft (413 m)
- Time zone: UTC-6 (Central (CST))
  - Summer (DST): UTC-5 (CDT)
- Area code: 218
- GNIS feature ID: 658248

Shooks is an unincorporated community in Shooks Township, Beltrami County, Minnesota, United States.

The community is located northeast of Bemidji at the junction of Minnesota State Highways 1 and 72.
