= Beaver River (Bear Island River tributary) =

Coordinates: 47.7960247°N 91.9676534°W

Location
- Country: United States

Physical characteristics
- Source
  - location: Minnesota

The Beaver River is a river of Minnesota. The river flows through the southwest part of Morse Township in northern Saint Louis County. It is a tributary of the Bear Island River.

== See also ==
- List of rivers of Minnesota
