= Florenton, Minnesota =

Florenton
- Unincorporated community
- Location within Minnesota Location within the United States
- Coordinates: 47°39′16″N 92°25′20″W
- Country: United States
- State: Minnesota
- County: Saint Louis
- Township: Wuori Township
- Elevation: 1,440 ft (440 m)

Population
  - Total: 60
- Time zone: UTC-6 (Central (CST))
  - Summer (DST): UTC-5 (CDT)
- ZIP code: 55792
- Area code: 218
- GNIS feature ID: 661293

Florenton is an unincorporated community in Wuori Township, Saint Louis County, Minnesota, United States; located near Britt.

The community is located eight miles northeast of the city of Virginia at the intersection of State Highway 169 (MN 169) and Saint Louis County Road 303 (Trillium Road). U.S. Highway 53 is nearby.

Florenton is located within the Superior National Forest.
