= Soudan, Minnesota =

Census-designated place in Minnesota, US

Soudan
- Census-designated place (CDP) and Unincorporated community
- Location within Minnesota
- Coordinates: 47°48′57″N 92°14′16″W
- Country: United States
- State: Minnesota
- County: Saint Louis
- Township: Breitung Township

Area
  - Total: 0.68 sq mi (1.76 km^{2})
  - Land: 0.68 sq mi (1.76 km^{2})
  - Water: 0 sq mi (0.00 km^{2})
- Elevation: 1,437 ft (438 m)

Population (2020)
  - Total: 385
  - Density: 566.2/sq mi (218.61/km^{2})
- Time zone: UTC-6 (Central (CST))
  - Summer (DST): UTC-5 (CDT)
- ZIP codes: 55782
- Area code: 218
- GNIS feature ID: 662492

Soudan is an unincorporated community and census-designated place (CDP) in Breitung Township, Saint Louis County, Minnesota, United States. As of the 2020 census, its population was 385.

The community is located immediately east of the city of Tower on Minnesota State Highway 1 and Minnesota State Highway 169.

It is the home of McKinley Park, a park and campground operated by Breitung Township, named in honor of former President of the United States, William McKinley, who was in office from 1897 to 1901.

The Soudan Underground Mine State Park is located nearby. Surface tours are available.

It has a post office with the ZIP code 55782.

== History ==
The village of Soudan was established March 3, 1885. Soudan obtained its name from D. H. Bacon, general manager of the Soudan Underground mine. Bacon named the area – with its severe winter cold – Soudan, in strong contrast to the tropical heat of the Soudan (or Sudan) region of Africa. The village had a post office, established as Tower Mines in 1887 and changed to Soudan in 1888; associated with Tower Junction. Soudan has since returned to being an unincorporated community.

The first mining exploration of the area took place in 1865.

According to the 1905 Legislative Manual of the State of Minnesota, the first mining done in northern Minnesota took place at Soudan in 1882. The Duluth & Iron Range Railroad had been built to the area. In 1886 the road was sold to the Minnesota Iron Company, which was absorbed into the Federal Steel Company and then into the United States Steel Corporation (operated by the Oliver Mining Company).

In 1903, the town was described as being located on the property of the mining company and no stores or saloons were allowed. The number of mine workers varied between 500 and 700 men.

Darby Nelson (1940–2022), writer and politician, was born in Soudan.

== See also ==
- Soudan Underground Mine State Park
