= Taconite State Trail =

Coordinates: 47°45′07″N 92°30′00″W

The Taconite State Trail extends 165 miles from Grand Rapids, Minnesota to Ely, Minnesota and intersects the Arrowhead State Trail west of Lake Vermilion. On the Grand Rapids end, the trail is paved for the first 6 miles for in-line skating and biking. The rest of the trail is natural surface used primarily in the winter months for snowmobiling. In the summer, several areas contain standing water, but some areas are suitable for horseback riding, hiking, and mountain biking

Taconite State Trail is a scenic experience twisting through aspen, birch, and pine forest leading to many isolated lakes and streams. Exploring the trail from Grand Rapids and heading north depicts the previous impact of the iron ore mining industry. As the trail goes north, the terrain becomes rolling and winding through thick forests. The Taconite Trail leads through State and National Forest land as well.

Along the Taconite Trail there are eight trail waysides and picnic areas which provide views of scenic vistas, rivers, and lakes. The trail links three state parks: McCarthy Beach, Soudan Underground Mine, and Bear Head Lake.

== Recreation ==
Nearby Minnesota Department of Natural Resources recreational areas include:

- Arrowhead State Trail
- George Washington State Forest
- Sturgeon River State Forest
- Bear Island State Forest
- McCarthy Beach State Park
- Soudan Underground Mine State Park
- Bear Head Lake State Park
- Saint Louis River Water Trail
- Vermilion River Water Trail
- Big Fork River Water Trail
- Mississippi River Water Trail

The Taconite Trail is most popular as a snowmobile route in the winter. Regularly groomed, the trail provides snowmobile riders with a scenic view of pristine lakes and forests across Minnesota's arrowhead region.

Snowmobile season lasts from December 1 through March 31. Winter conditions vary each year, however best conditions are between late December and mid March.
