= Hays Lake =

Lake in the state of Minnesota, United States

- Location within Minnesota
- Location: Clearwater County, Minnesota
- Coordinates: 47°11′10″N 95°14′43″W
- Type: lake

Hays Lake is a lake in Clearwater County, Minnesota, in the United States.

Hays Lake was named for an assistant to Jacob V. Brower.

== See also ==
- List of lakes in Minnesota
