= Oslo, Minnesota =

City in Minnesota, United States

Oslo
- City
- Location of Oslo within Marshall County, Minnesota
- Coordinates: 48°11′45″N 97°7′53″W
- Country: United States
- State: Minnesota
- County: Marshall

Area
  - Total: 0.39 sq mi (1.01 km^{2})
  - Land: 0.37 sq mi (0.96 km^{2})
  - Water: 0.019 sq mi (0.05 km^{2})
- Elevation: 807 ft (246 m)

Population (2020)
  - Total: 239
  - Estimate (2021): 243
  - Density: 644.6/sq mi (248.87/km^{2})
- Time zone: UTC-6 (CST)
  - Summer (DST): UTC-5 (CDT)
- ZIP code: 56744
- Area code: 218
- FIPS code: 27-48976
- GNIS feature ID: 0649021
- Website: wiktel.com/city/oslo/

Oslo (/ˈɒsloʊ/ OSS-loh) is a city in Marshall County, Minnesota, United States. The population was 239 at the 2020 census.

Minnesota Highway 1 and Minnesota Highway 220 are two of the main routes in the community. Oslo is three miles east of Interstate 29 in nearby North Dakota.

== History ==
A post office called Oslo has been in operation since 1905. The city was named after Oslo, the capital of Norway.

== Geography ==
According to the United States Census Bureau, the city has a total area of 0.38 square miles (0.98 km^{2}), of which 0.36 square miles (0.93 km^{2}) is land and 0.02 square miles (0.05 km^{2}) is water.

Oslo is located along Minnesota Highway 1, adjacent to the state line of North Dakota (Walsh County).

The Red River of the North flows through at the western edge of Oslo.

== Demographics ==
Historical population
| Census | Pop. | Note | %± |
|---|---|---|---|
| 1910 | 344 | | — |
| 1920 | 365 | | 6.1% |
| 1930 | 328 | | −10.1% |
| 1940 | 392 | | 19.5% |
| 1950 | 440 | | 12.2% |
| 1960 | 372 | | −15.5% |
| 1970 | 417 | | 12.1% |
| 1980 | 379 | | −9.1% |
| 1990 | 362 | | −4.5% |
| 2000 | 347 | | −4.1% |
| 2010 | 330 | | −4.9% |
| 2020 | 239 | | −27.6% |
| 2021 (est.) | 243 | | 1.7% |
U.S. Decennial Census; 2020 Census

=== 2010 census ===
As of the census of 2010, there were 330 people, 134 households, and 82 families living in the city. The population density was 916.7 inhabitants per square mile (353.9/km^{2}). There were 158 housing units at an average density of 438.9 per square mile (169.5/km^{2}). The racial makeup of the city was 83.3% White, 1.8% Native American, 0.3% Asian, 13.0% from other races, and 1.5% from two or more races. Hispanic or Latino of any race were 20.3% of the population.

There were 134 households, of which 33.6% had children under the age of 18 living with them, 48.5% were married couples living together, 4.5% had a female householder with no husband present, 8.2% had a male householder with no wife present, and 38.8% were non-families. 34.3% of all households were made up of individuals, and 20.1% had someone living alone who was 65 years of age or older. The average household size was 2.46 and the average family size was 3.21.

The median age in the city was 35.5 years. 26.7% of residents were under the age of 18; 9.8% were between the ages of 18 and 24; 22.5% were from 25 to 44; 21.8% were from 45 to 64; and 19.4% were 65 years of age or older. The gender makeup of the city was 47.3% male and 52.7% female.

=== 2000 census ===
As of the census of 2000, there were 347 people, 148 households, and 83 families living in the city. The population density was 973.0 inhabitants per square mile (375.7/km^{2}). There were 162 housing units at an average density of 454.3 per square mile (175.4/km^{2}). The racial makeup of the city was 88.47% White, 10.09% from other races, and 1.44% from two or more races. Hispanic or Latino of any race were 19.31% of the population.

There were 148 households, out of which 27.7% had children under the age of 18 living with them, 49.3% were married couples living together, 4.1% had a female householder with no husband present, and 43.9% were non-families. 41.2% of all households were made up of individuals, and 25.0% had someone living alone who was 65 years of age or older. The average household size was 2.34 and the average family size was 3.18.

In the city, the population was spread out, with 26.2% under the age of 18, 8.1% from 18 to 24, 27.1% from 25 to 44, 17.9% from 45 to 64, and 20.7% who were 65 years of age or older. The median age was 38 years. For every 100 females, there were 102.9 males. For every 100 females age 18 and over, there were 96.9 males.

The median income for a household in the city was $34,375, and the median income for a family was $47,857. Males had a median income of $33,750 versus $18,571 for females. The per capita income for the city was $15,290. About 6.0% of families and 14.8% of the population were below the poverty line, including 24.0% of those under age 18 and 8.1% of those age 65 or over.
