= Beaver Bay Township, Lake County, Minnesota =

Beaver Bay Township, Minnesota
- Township
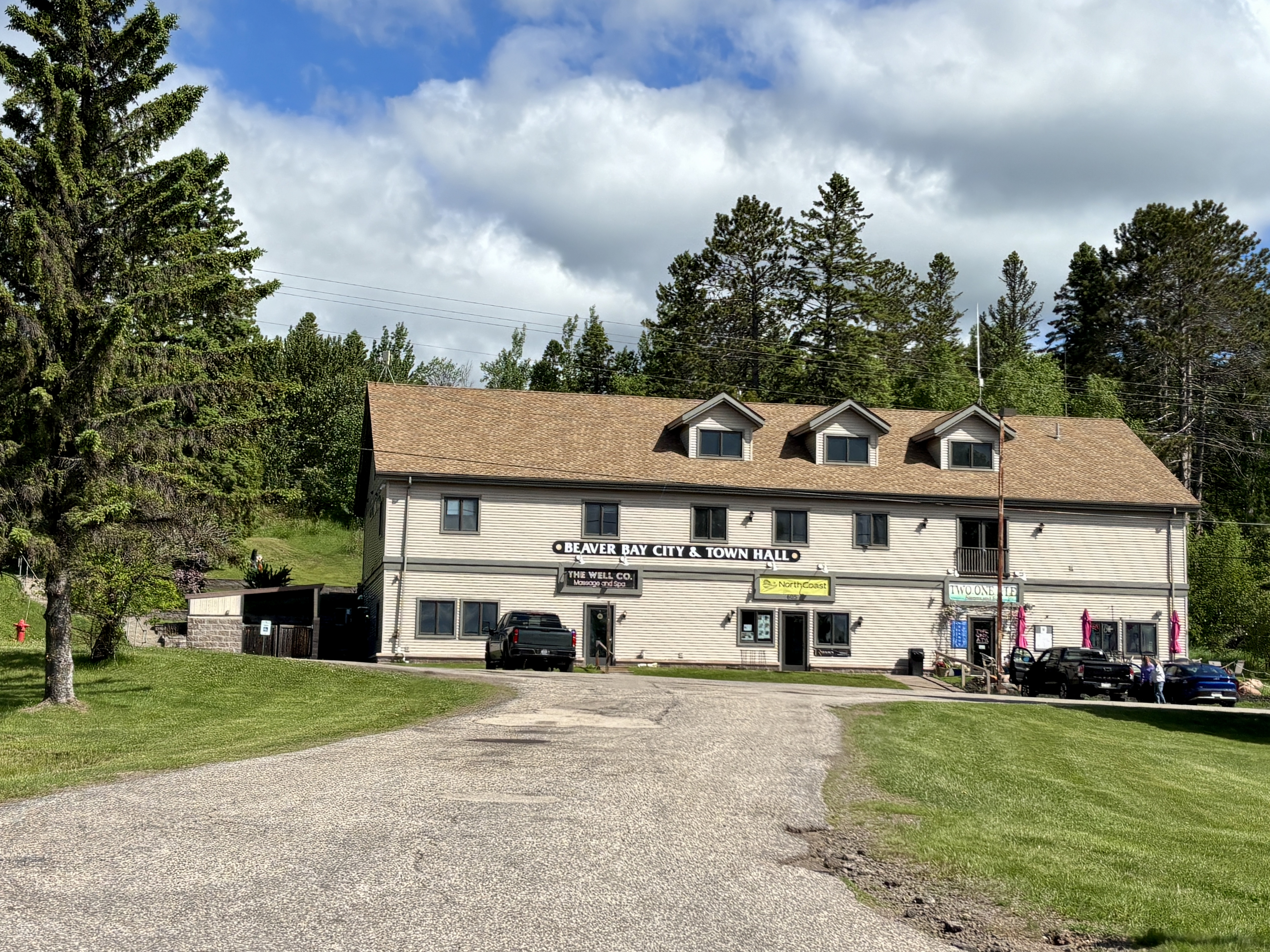
- City & Town Hall

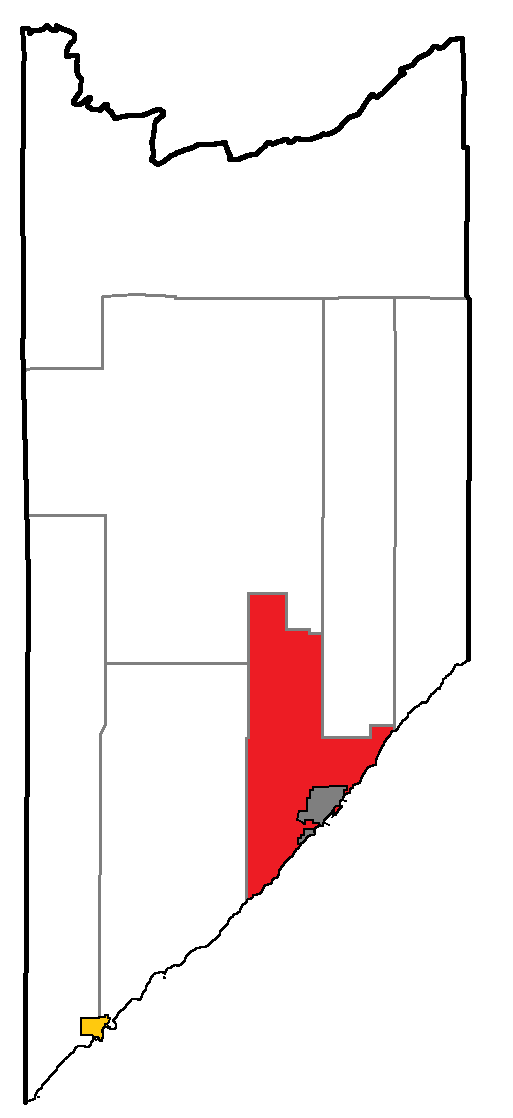
- Location of Beaver Bay Township in Lake County, Minnesota
- Coordinates: 47°19′45″N 91°18′45″W
- Country: United States
- State: Minnesota
- County: Lake
- Organized: 1885

Area
  - Total: 140.2 sq mi (363.1 km^{2})
  - Land: 138.6 sq mi (358.9 km^{2})
  - Water: 1.6 sq mi (4.2 km^{2})
- Elevation: 1,588 ft (484 m)

Population (2020)
  - Total: 517
  - Estimate (2021): 523
  - Density: 3.73/sq mi (1.44/km^{2})
- Time zone: UTC-6 (CST)
  - Summer (DST): UTC-5 (CDT)
- ZIP code: 55601
- Area code: 218
- FIPS code: 27-04474
- GNIS feature ID: 0663540
- Website: https://www.bbtownship.com/

Beaver Bay Township is a township in Lake County, Minnesota, United States. The population was 517 at the 2020 census. It contains part of the census-designated place of Finland.

State Highways 1 and 61 are two of the main routes in the township.

Beaver Bay Township was organized in 1885, and named after Beaver Bay, Minnesota.

== Geography ==
According to the United States Census Bureau, the township has a total area of 140.2 square miles (363 km^{2}), of which 138.6 square miles (359 km^{2}) is land and 1.6 square miles (4.1 km^{2}) (1.16%) is water.

== Demographics ==
Historical population
Census	Pop.	Note	%±
1880	106		—
1890	75		−29.2%
1900	399		432.0%
1910	284		−28.8%
1920	263		−7.4%
1930	335		27.4%
1940	381		13.7%
1950	580		52.2%
1960	942		62.4%
1970	905		−3.9%
1980	1,066		17.8%
1990	511		−52.1%
2000	582		13.9%
2010	473		−18.7%
2020	517		9.3%
2021 (est.)	523		1.2%
U.S. Decennial Census; 2020 Census

As of the census of 2020, the population was 517 people, 400 households residing in the township. The population density was 2.5 people per square mile. There were 456 housing units at an average density with 95% owner occupied and 58% vacant. The racial makeup of the township was 94% White, 5% Hispanic and 1% from two or more races.

Of the 193 households, 76% of were married couples living together, 8% had a female householder and 15% were non-families. The average household size was 1.8 persons per household.

The median age was 63.7 years and 51% of the population was age18-64. 1% of the population were under 18 years of age, 51% from 18 40n 64 years of age and 48% were 65 years of age or older. For every 100 females, there were 104.9 males. The population was 56% female and 44% male.

The median household income was $84,861 and the median per capita income was $51,144. About 5.5% of people were below the poverty line, including 5.3% 8% of those age 65 or over.
