= Crab Lake (St. Louis County, Minnesota) =

Lake in the state of Minnesota, United States

- Location within Minnesota
- Location: St. Louis County, Minnesota
- Coordinates: 47°56′39″N 92°3′46″W
- Type: Lake
- Surface elevation: 1,460 feet (450 m)

Crab Lake is a lake in St. Louis County, in the U.S. state of Minnesota.

Crab Lake was so named on account of its outline being shaped like a crab.

== See also ==
- List of lakes in Minnesota
