= Sand Lake, Minnesota =

Unorganized territory in St. Louis County, Minnesota, United States

Coordinates: 47°40′19″N 92°43′40″W

- Unorganized territory
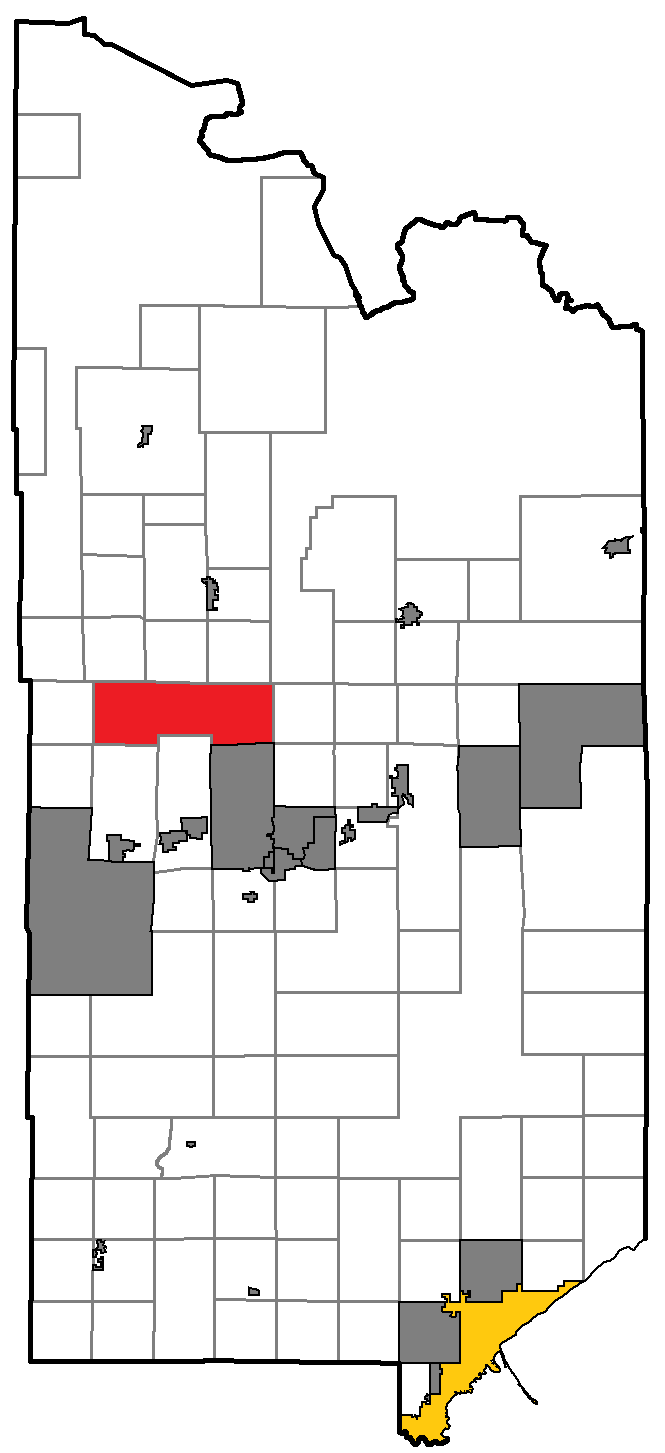
- Location of Sand Lake within St. Louis County, Minnesota
- Country: United States
- State: Minnesota
- County: St. Louis

Area
  - Total: 97.51 sq mi (252.5 km^{2})
  - Land: 94.47 sq mi (244.7 km^{2})
  - Water: 3.05 sq mi (7.9 km^{2})

Population (2020)
  - Total: 1,130
  - Density: 12.0/sq mi (4.62/km^{2})
- Time zone: UTC-6 (Central (CST))
  - Summer (DST): UTC-5 (CDT)
- Area code: 218

Sand Lake is an unorganized territory in Saint Louis County, Minnesota, United States, located within the unincorporated area of Britt. The population was 1,130 at the 2020 census.

== Geography ==
According to the United States Census Bureau, the unorganized territory has a total area of 34.4 square miles (89.1 km^{2}); 32.7 square miles (84.8 km^{2}) is land and 1.6 square miles (4.3 km^{2}) (4.80%) is water.

== Demographics ==
At the 2000 United States census, there were 1,060 people, 401 households, and 326 families living in the unorganized territory. The population density was 32.4 inhabitants per square mile (12.5/km^{2}). There were 468 housing units at an average density of 14.3 per square mile (5.5/km^{2}). The racial makeup of the unorganized territory was 97.55% White, 0.85% Native American, 0.75% Asian, and 0.85% from two or more races. Hispanic or Latino of any race were 0.75%.

Of the 401 households, 31.2% had children under the age of 18 living with them, 74.8% were married couples living together, 3.0% had a female householder with no husband present, and 18.7% were non-families. 14.5% of households were one person and 3.0% were one person aged 65 or older. The average household size was 2.64 and the average family size was 2.91.

The age distribution was 24.2% under the age of 18, 5.0% from 18 to 24, 25.1% from 25 to 44, 35.2% from 45 to 64, and 10.5% 65 or older. The median age was 43 years. For every 100 females, there were 108.3 males. For every 100 females age 18 and over, there were 108.6 males.

The median household income was $52,760 and the median family income was $56,458. Males had a median income of $46,371 versus $23,906 for females. The per capita income for the unorganized territory was $21,169. About 5.8% of families and 5.4% of the population were below the poverty line, including 3.9% of those under age 18 and 22.4% of those age 65 or over.
