= Pike River (Minnesota) =

Coordinates: 47°47′47″N 92°22′06″W

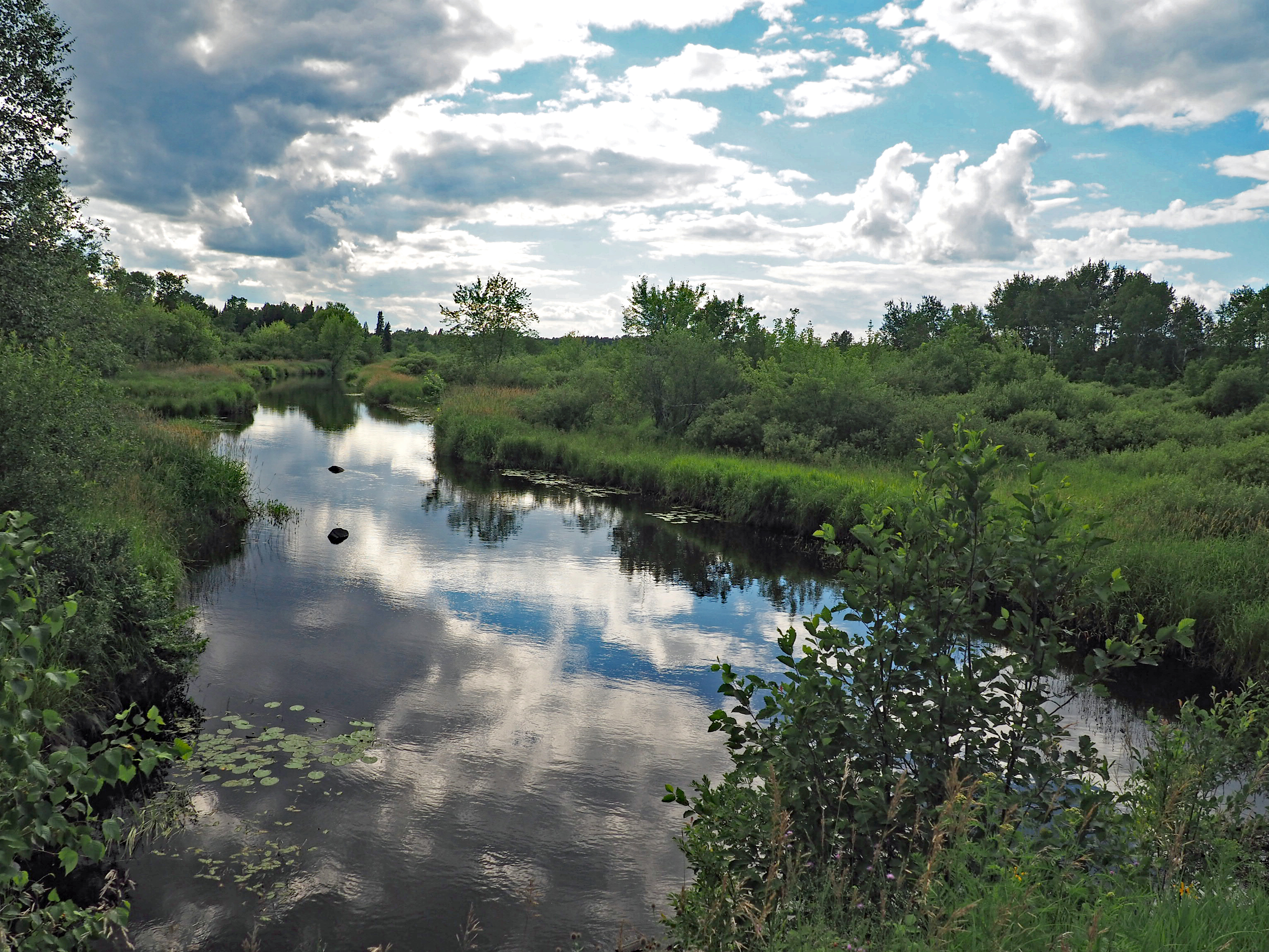
- The Pike River in Pike River Township

Location
- Country: United States

Physical characteristics
- Source
  - location: Minnesota

The Pike River is a river of Minnesota, United States. The river was named on account of its stock of pike fish.

== See also ==
- List of rivers of Minnesota
