= Hay Lake, Minnesota =

Unorganized territory in St. Louis County, Minnesota, United States

Coordinates: 47°35′22″N 92°22′23″W

- Unorganized territory
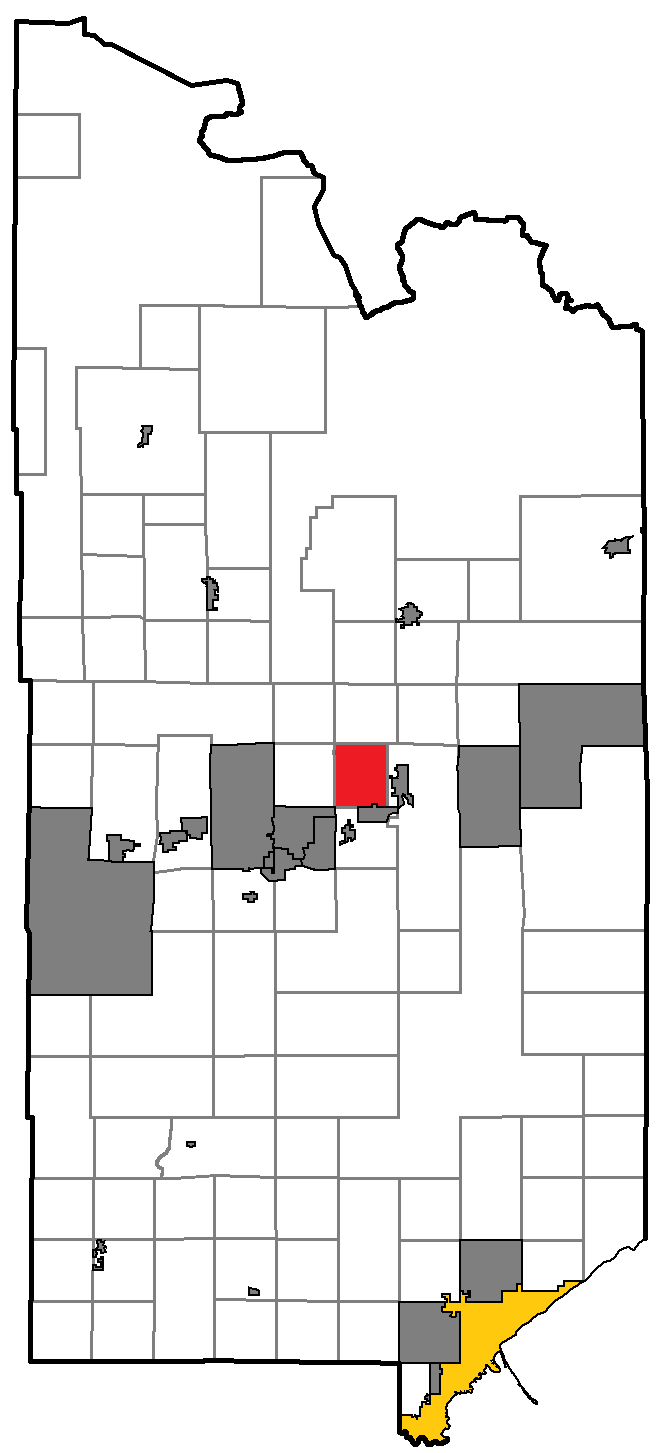
- Location of Hay Lake within St. Louis County, Minnesota
- Country: United States
- State: Minnesota
- County: St. Louis

Area
  - Total: 30.68 sq mi (79.5 km^{2})
  - Land: 30.45 sq mi (78.9 km^{2})
  - Water: 0.23 sq mi (0.60 km^{2})

Population (2020)
  - Total: 97
  - Density: 3.2/sq mi (1.2/km^{2})
- Time zone: UTC-6 (Central (CST))
  - Summer (DST): UTC-5 (CDT)
- Area code: 218

Hay Lake is an unorganized territory in Saint Louis County, Minnesota, United States. The population was 97 at the 2020 census.

Nearby places include Biwabik Township, the city of Biwabik, White Township, and Pike Township.

== Geography ==
According to the United States Census Bureau, the unorganized territory has a total area of 30.0 square miles (77.8 km^{2}), of which 29.8 square miles (77.2 km^{2}) is land and 0.2 square mile (0.6 km^{2}) (0.77%) is water.

== Demographics ==
At the 2010 census, 83 people lived in the territory (down from the figure of 98 recorded in 2000) in 38 households and 29 families. The racial makeup of the unorganized territory was 100.00% White.
