= Peyla, Minnesota =

Peyla
- Unincorporated community
- Location within Minnesota Location within the United States
- Coordinates: 47°47′07″N 92°21′48″W
- Country: United States
- State: Minnesota
- County: Saint Louis
- Township: Vermilion Lake Township
- Elevation: 1,467 ft (447 m)

Population
  - Total: 10
- Time zone: UTC-6 (Central (CST))
  - Summer (DST): UTC-5 (CDT)
- ZIP code: 55790
- Area code: 218
- GNIS feature ID: 662166

Peyla is an unincorporated community in Vermilion Lake Township, Saint Louis County, Minnesota, United States.

== Geography ==
The community is located four miles west of Tower at the junction of State Highway 169 (MN 169), State Highway 1 (MN 1), and Saint Louis County Road 77 (Angus Road).

== History ==
A post office called Peyla was established in 1907, and remained in operation until 1924. Peter Peyla, an early postmaster, gave the community its name.
