= Bear Island State Forest =

State forest in Minnesota, United States

- Location within Minnesota
- Interactive map of Bear Island State Forest

Geography
- Location: Lake and Saint Louis counties, Minnesota, United States
- Coordinates: 47°47′24″N 91°47′38″W
- Area: 157,814 acres (63,865 ha)

Administration
- Established: 1963
- Authority: Minnesota Department of Natural Resources, Counties
- Website: www.dnr.state.mn.us/state_forests/sft00004/index.html

Ecology
- WWF Classification: Western Great Lakes forests
- EPA Classification: Northern Lakes and Forests
- Disturbance: Wildfire
- Dominant tree species: Betula papyrifera, Populus tremuloides, Populus grandidentata, Pinus banksiana

The Bear Island State Forest is a state forest in Minnesota bordered by the towns of Ely, Babbitt, and Tower in Lake and Saint Louis counties. It is adjacent to the Burntside State Forest and the federally managed Superior National Forest and Boundary Waters Canoe Area Wilderness. It is managed primarily by the Minnesota Department of Natural Resources and the counties.

Prior to European settlement, the area was dominated by the old-growth Eastern White Pine which was completely harvested around the beginning of the twentieth century. Subsequent wildfires in the area have caused the dominance of primary successional species such as birch, aspen, and Jack pine. Approximately 250 acres (100 ha) of land are harvested each year, of which 170 acres (69 ha) are artificially regenerated through planting and seeding.

Outdoor recreation opportunities include cross-country skiing and hiking trails, 27.4 miles (44.1 km) of snowmobiling trails, and 10 miles (16 km) of mountain biking trails. There is boat access to the 2,362-acre (956 ha) Bear Island Lake, 5,628-acre (2,278 ha) Birch Lake, as well as canoe and boat access to multiple smaller lakes within the forest. The Taconite State Trail runs through the forest, although it can only be accessed through the nearby Bear Head Lake State Park and Soudan Underground Mine State Park.

== See also ==
- List of Minnesota state forests
