= Minnesota State Highway 1 =

State highway in Minnesota, United States

Trunk Highway 1
- MN 1 highlighted in red

Route information
- Maintained by MnDOT
- Length: 345.954 mi (556.759 km)
- Existed: 1933–present

Major junctions
- West end: ND 54 at the Red River in Oslo
- US 75 at Warren; US 59 / MN 32 at Thief River Falls; MN 219 near Goodridge; MN 89 at Red Lake; US 71 / MN 46 at Northome; MN 38 at Effie; MN 65 at Togo; US 53 at Cook; MN 169 at Ely
- East end: MN 61 at Illgen City

Location
- Country: United States
- State: Minnesota
- Counties: Marshall, Pennington, Clearwater, Beltrami, Koochiching, Itasca, St. Louis, Lake

Highway system
- Minnesota Trunk Highway System; Interstate; US; State; Legislative; Scenic
← I-694	→ US 2

Minnesota State Highway 1 (MN 1) is a state highway across northern Minnesota, United States, which runs from North Dakota Highway 54 (ND 54) at the North Dakota state line (at the Red River in Oslo) and continues east to its eastern terminus at MN 61 at the unincorporated community of Illgen City in Beaver Bay Township on the North Shore of Lake Superior. At 346 miles (557 km) in length, MN 1 is the longest state route in Minnesota.

== Route description ==
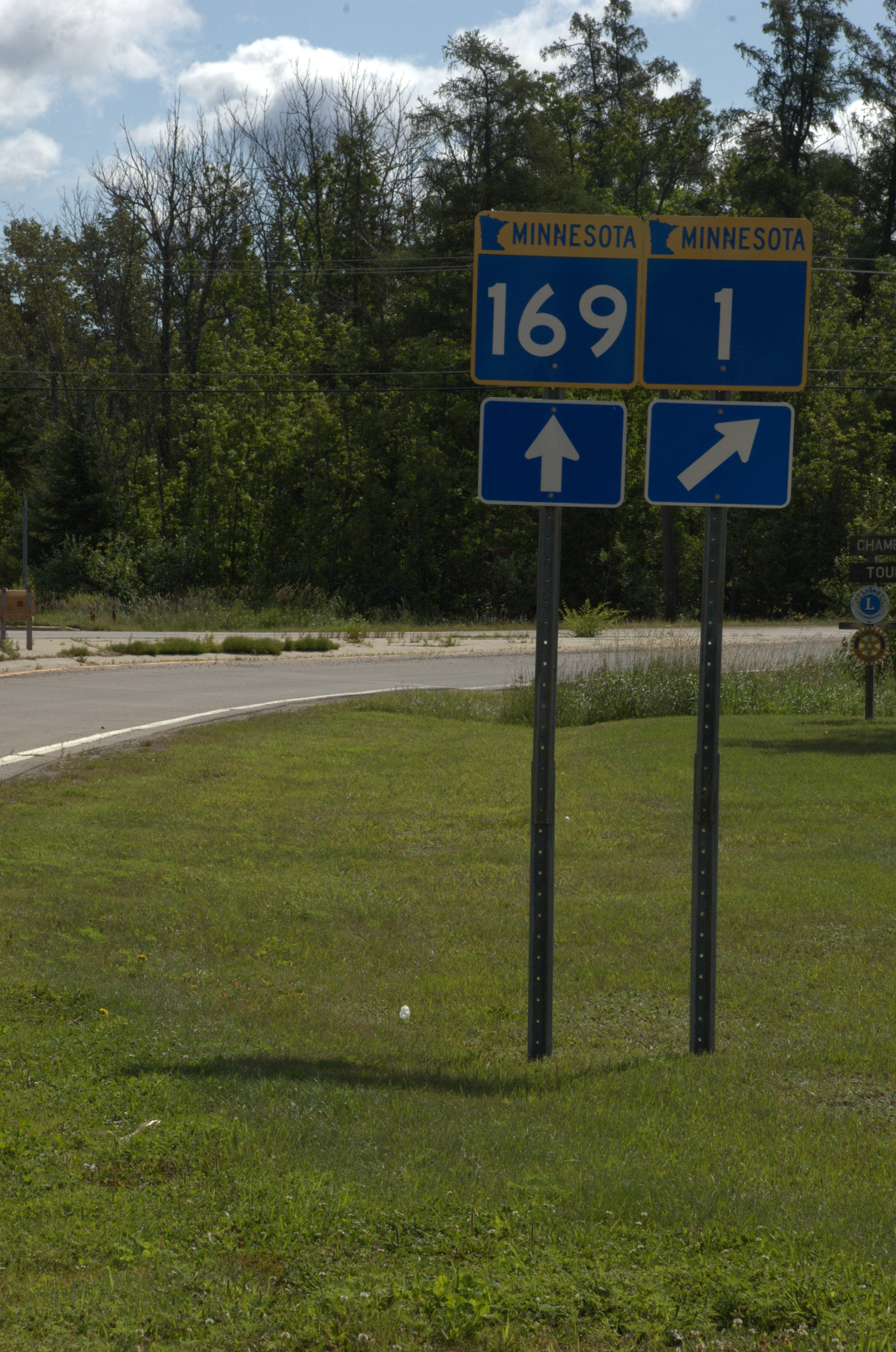
Intersection of MN 1 and MN 169 in Ely, August 2008

MN 1 serves as an east–west route between Oslo, Warren, Thief River Falls, Red Lake, Northome, Cook, Tower, Ely, and Beaver Bay Township.

The roadway passes through the following forests:

- Finland State Forest in Lake County
- Superior National Forest in Lake and Saint Louis counties
- Bear Island State Forest in Lake and Saint Louis counties
- Kabetogama State Forest in Saint Louis County
- George Washington State Forest in Itasca County
- Koochiching State Forest in Koochiching County

The route runs concurrently with MN 169 for 26 miles (42 km) from Vermilion Lake Township (west of Tower) to Ely.

MN 1 also runs concurrently with MN 89 for 28 miles (45 km) on the southwest side of Red Lake. This is the longest concurrency with another state highway within Minnesota.

== History ==
Most of MN 1 was authorized in 1933, except for a section between U.S. Highway 75 (US 75) and MN 32 at Thief River Falls, which was part of Minnesota Constitutional Route 33 authorized in 1920.

The route was given the MN 1 designation because it was one of the longest trunk highways, and would allow re-use of the MN 1 markers removed from along US 61 and US 65 in 1934.

When it was marked in 1934, it was only paved from US 75 to MN 32 and from MN 169 to Ely.

As recently as 1963, significant portions of MN 1 were unpaved.

MN 1 still had an unpaved segment in 1996, between US 53 and MN 169 in northern Saint Louis County. At that point it was swapped with paved County Road 22.

== Major intersections ==
County	Location	mi	km	Destinations	Notes
Red River of the North		0.000	0.000	ND 54 west	Continuation in North Dakota
Marshall	Oak Park Township	1.554	2.501	MN 220 north / CSAH 3 – MN 11	Western end of MN 220 concurrency
Marshall	Alvarado	6.555	10.549	MN 220 south (Boundary Street) / CSAH 10 – East Grand Forks	Eastern end of MN 220 concurrency
Marshall	Warren	17.050	27.439	US 75 (S Main Street) – Crookston, Hallock	
Pennington	Thief River Falls	44.457	71.547	US 59 north / CSAH 16 – Karlstad	Western end of US 59 concurrency
Pennington	Thief River Falls	45.771	73.661	MN 32 south (Main Avenue) / US 59 south (3rd Street East) – Red Lake Falls	Southern end of MN 32 concurrency; eastern end of US 59 concurrency
Pennington	Thief River Falls	46.118	74.220	MN 32 north (Main Avenue) – Greenbush	Northern end of MN 32 concurrency
Pennington	Goodridge Township	63.367	101.979	MN 219 north / CSAH 24 – Goodridge	Southern terminus of MN 219
Beltrami	Red Lake Indian Reservation	89.331	143.764	MN 89 north – Grygla, Roseau	Northern end of MN 89 concurrency
Clearwater	No major junctions				
Beltrami	Red Lake Indian Reservation	116.960	188.229	MN 89 south – Bemidji	Southern end of MN 89 concurrency
Beltrami	Cormant Township	141.331	227.450	MN 72 south / CSAH 36 – Blackduck, Bemidji	Western end of MN 72 concurrency
Beltrami	Shooks	146.400	235.608	MN 72 north – Kelliher, Baudette	Eastern end of MN 72 concurrency
Koochiching	Unorganized Territory of Northome	151.288	243.474	US 71 south – Blackduck, Bemidji	Southern end of US 71 concurrency
Koochiching	Northome	154.276	248.283	US 71 north / CSAH 15 – International Falls	Northern end of US 71 concurrency
Koochiching	Northome	154.564	248.747	MN 46 south / CSAH 40 – Deer River	
Koochiching	Unorganized Territory of Northome	178.128	286.669	MN 6 north – Big Falls	Northern end of MN 6 concurrency
Itasca	Unorganized Territory of Effie	180.452	290.409	MN 6 south – Deer River	Southern end of MN 6 concurrency
Itasca	Effie	186.656	300.394	MN 38 south – Bigfork	
Itasca	Carpenter Township	211.369	340.165	MN 65 south – Nashwauk	Western end of MN 65 concurrency
Itasca	Carpenter Township	215.424	346.691	MN 65 north – Littlefork	Eastern end of MN 65 concurrency
St. Louis	Linden Grove	229.223	368.899	MN 73 – Chisholm, US 53	
St. Louis	Field Township	236.245	380.199	US 53 north / CSAH 115 – International Falls	Northern end of US 53 concurrency
St. Louis	Sherman Corner	244.377	393.287	US 53 south / CSAH 22 – Virginia	Southern end of US 53 concurrency
St. Louis	Peyla	258.848	416.575	MN 169 south – Virginia	Western end of MN 169 concurrency
St. Louis	Tower	263.159	423.513	MN 135 south – Embarrass, Babbitt, Aurora	
St. Louis	Ely	286.208	460.607	MN 169 north – Winton	Eastern end of MN 169 concurrency
Lake	Illgen City	347.340	558.990	MN 61 / LSCT – Two Harbors, Grand Marais	
1.000 mi = 1.609 km; 1.000 km = 0.621 mi: Concurrency terminus
