= Bear Head Lake State Park =

State park of Minnesota, United States

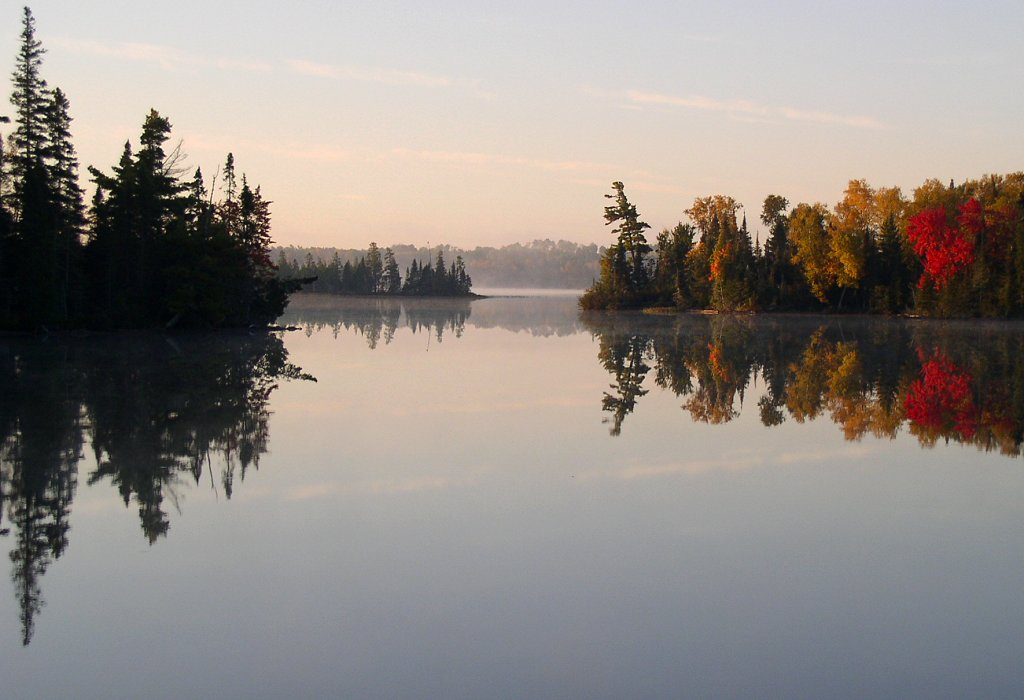
- Bear Head Lake from a trail in the campground

- Location within Minnesota Location within the United States
- Location: Saint Louis County, Minnesota, United States
- Coordinates: 47°47′43″N 92°4′12″W
- Area: 4,373 acres (17.70 km^{2})
- Elevation: 1,506 ft (459 m)
- Established: 1961
- Governing body: Minnesota Department of Natural Resources

Bear Head Lake State Park

Bear Head Lake State Park is a state park of Minnesota, United States, providing ready access to outdoor recreation in the Boundary Waters region. It boasts scenery similar to the nearby Boundary Waters Canoe Area Wilderness, with the added conveniences of road access, modern facilities, and motorboating. The most popular visitor activities are boating, fishing, swimming, and hiking. The park entirely surrounds 670-acre (270 ha) Bear Head Lake and three other fishing lakes. It was established in 1961 in Saint Louis County near Ely, Minnesota. The park also contains the woodlands surrounding the lakes, which gives an entire total of about 5,540 acres. The park also shares a large border with Bear Island State Forest.

In September 2010, Bear Head Lake State Park was voted "America's Favorite Park" in a major online poll. The little-known park, not even among Minnesota's most popular, won in a surprise landslide, capturing 28% of the more than 5.7 million votes. The strong showing was credited to the online fan community of mother and cub black bears, featured on a popular webcam, whose territory included the park.

== Geography ==
Bear Head Lake State Park is located in Saint Louis County, 19 miles (31 km) southwest of Ely; and 18 miles (29 km) east of Tower. The park is located 6 miles south of the junction of State Highway 169 (MN 169) and County Road 128 in Eagles Nest Township. The park entrance is located on County Road 128. Elevation ranges from 1,450 to 1,590 feet (440 to 480 m). The Laurentian Divide crosses the southern end of the park.

The park completely surrounds Bear Head and four smaller lakes and includes partial shoreline of three others. 670-acre (270 ha) Bear Head Lake has 11.7 miles (18.8 km) of shoreline, an average depth of 12 feet (3.7 m), and a maximum depth of 46 feet (14 m). The northwest corner of the park includes 5.4 miles (8.7 km) of shore on Eagles Nest Lake No. 3, almost half of the 966-acre (391 ha) lake's shoreline. Blueberry Lake and Square Lake near the southeast corner are 53 acres (21 ha) and 17 acres (6.9 ha) respectively. Near the park road, Cub Lake covers 10 acres (4 ha) with a maximum depth of 38 feet (12 m) while 8-acre (3.2 ha) Norberg Lake reaches 29 feet (8.8 m) deep. 213-acre (86 ha) Grassy Lake straddles the eastern boundary, with 1.2 miles (1.9 km) of shoreline within the park; a quarter of its total. Numerous other ponds and bogs dot Bear Head Lake State Park. Although its statutory boundary covers 4,373 acres (1,770 ha), this figure omits lake surfaces, which would bring the total to 5,540 acres (2,240 ha).

Bear Head Lake State Park is largely bordered by Bear Island State Forest. Parts of Superior National Forest are within 3 miles (5 km), and the Boundary Waters Canoe Area Wilderness lies 20 miles (30 km) away.

== Natural history ==
=== Geology ===
Bear Head Lake State Park's topography ranges from rolling to very steep, with rocky ridges and hills interspersed with lakes and bogs. Bedrock crops out in many places through the thin glacial soil. Two Archean formations comprise the bedrock. The eastern half of the park is underlain by Giants Range Granite; elsewhere by the Ely greenstone belt. The iron-rich greenstone is metamorphosed pillow lava erupted from underwater volcanoes.

A succession of ice ages scoured the region down to the 2,700-million-year-old bedrock. The last glacial period from 12,000 to 10,000 years ago deposited stony till only about 4 feet (1.2 m) thick, as well as the Walston and Vermillion moraines. These two terminal moraines were formed at different periods of the glacier's retreat, leaving thick ridges of sandy debris across the landscape.

=== Flora ===
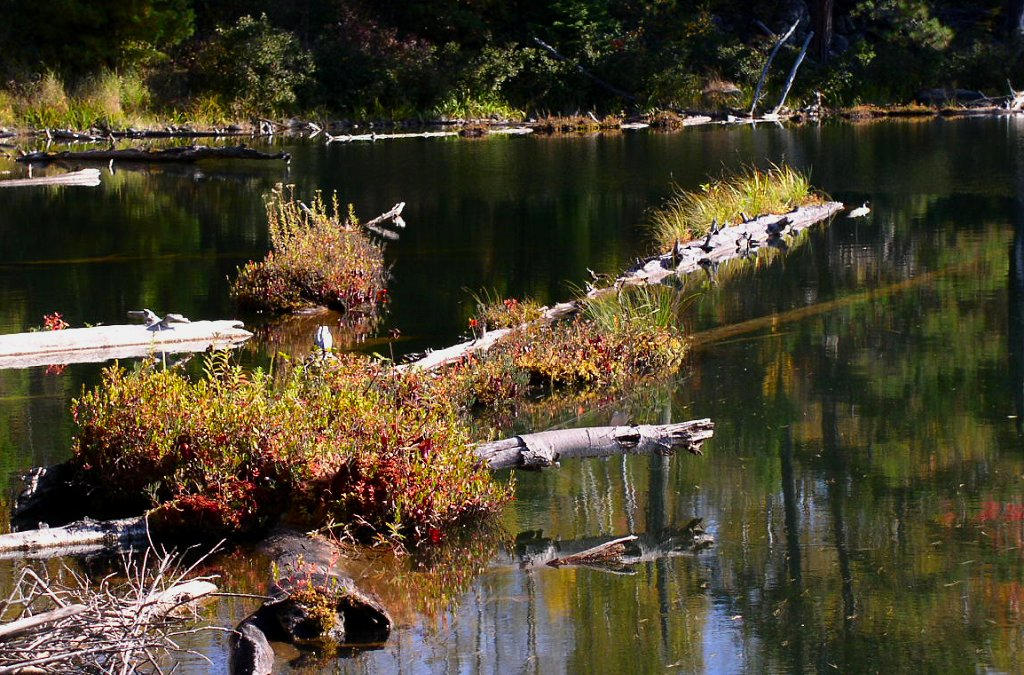
Floating logs on Cub Lake support bog plants

Bear Head Lake State Park is mostly forested, with several different plant communities based on soil and location. Human activity has altered the forest composition significantly since European settlement.

The park's pre-contact vegetation would have been dominated by eastern white pine and red pine, with jack pine barrens and openings. The tall pines in the picnic area are remnants of this old growth forest. However extensive logging around 1900 and subsequent wildfires, followed by years of strict wildfire suppression, have produced a much-altered secondary forest throughout much of the park.

Three coniferous swamp communities intermix in areas of peaty soil in the park. Black spruce bogs have a dense canopy of black spruce, a shrub layer of black spruce and speckled alder, an understory of bog Labrador tea or leatherleaf depending on shadiness, and a ground cover of sphagnum. Tamarack bogs have an open canopy of tamarack with plenty of black spruce, a shrub layer of speckled alder and dwarf birch, and a very dense understory of leatherleaf with bog-laurel and bog-rosemary over sphagnum. White cedar swamps are characterized by northern white cedar with black spruce and balsam fir, dense speckled alder shrubs, and less understory and sphagnum than the other communities.

Less-wooded shrub swamps are composed of speckled alder, red osier dogwood, and willow, with an understory of meadowsweet, leatherleaf, and heath. The ground cover is a mix of grasses, mosses, and soil litter.

The park bears three distinct upland forest types. Pine forest grows on level areas, ridgetops, and lakeshores. Its canopy is a mix of red and white pine with balsam fir, quaking aspen, and paper birch with occasional jack pine. The shrub layer varies inversely with the density of the canopy, and comprises beaked hazel, juneberry, blueberry, and bush honeysuckle. Aspen–birch forest occurs as an early-succession cover type on the moraines, the last areas of the park to be logged. Its canopy is dominated by trembling aspen and paper birch, with balsam fir and red and white pine. Beaked hazel dominates the dense shrub layer, while ground cover is characterized by bracken fern and forbs such as largeleaf aster and sarsaparilla. Lastly the shallow upland till soils support aspen–birch–fir forest. Trembling aspen, paper birch, and balsam fir are of course dominant, with some black and white spruce, red and white pine, and white cedar. Beaked hazel and mountain maple comprise the modest shrub layer, while the ground cover is more litter and grasses than forbs.

=== Fauna ===
Surrounded by lightly populated forestland, Bear Head Lake State Park supports a fuller range of species than many parks ringed by human development. Large mammals such as moose, black bears, and timber wolves are present. More commonly seen, though, are white-tailed deer, red foxes, snowshoe hares, red squirrels, and eastern chipmunks. Other species include beavers, river otters, masked shrews, least chipmunks, southern red-backed voles, and meadow voles.

The park provides summer breeding habitat for numerous birds, but only a few species remain over winter. Classic Boundary Waters birds like the common loon, bald eagle, osprey, common raven, and Canada jay are all present. Other notable residents include the red-breasted nuthatch, pine grosbeak, red crossbill, and boreal chickadee.

Each forest type attracts its own subset of summer birds. The aspen–birch community supports ovenbirds, red-eyed vireos, veeries, ruffed grouse, black-capped chickadees, least flycatchers, and black-throated green warblers. The same species appear in the aspen–birch–fir forest with the addition of white-throated sparrows, magnolia warblers, yellow-rumped warblers, and winter wrens. The most common overwinterers are black-capped chickadees, gray jays, pine grosbeaks, and hairy and downy woodpeckers. Specific to the pine forests are Blackburnian warblers, hermit thrushes, eastern wood pewees, golden-crowned kinglets, brown creepers, and red-breasted nuthatches.

The most common birds of prey are broad-winged hawks and American kestrels, followed by red-tailed hawks, great horned owls, and barred owls. Water birds include the loon, great blue heron, common merganser, spotted sandpiper, and herring gull.

== Cultural history ==
=== Prehistory and settlement ===
The past of the Bear Head Lake area is only poorly known. Native American archaeological sites have been found outside the park dating back to 4000 BCE. European fur traders entered the region in the late 18th century, building economic ties with the local Native Americans. The 1854 Treaty of La Pointe enabled Euro-American settlement and industry in the Arrowhead Region.

A gold mine was established in the north-central part of the future park in 1885, but found nothing. Logging began around Bear Head Lake in 1895, and a sawmill operated on the south shore. The mill was built by the Allen and Whittenburg Company in 1907, sold to the Tower Lumber Company after two seasons, and dismantled in 1911. A logging railroad served the sawmill while another skirted the north end of the lake. Portions of both railbeds are still discernible in the park. Also visible are charred stumps from numerous slash fires between 1911 and 1913. After being logged over, the area saw little activity beyond a few private lake cabins.

=== Park creation ===
Created largely on property already owned by the state, Bear Head Lake State Park was established quickly and smoothly. In 1959 two officials from the Division of Forestry were inspecting a new road to Bear Head Lake and were impressed with its potential as a state park. They shared their recommendation with the Division of Parks and Trails and started building local support. Iron Range congressmen introduced a bill in February 1961, the Minnesota Legislature passed it unanimously, and Governor Elmer L. Andersen signed it into law in April.

3,386 acres (1,370 ha) of the 4,373-acre (1,770 ha) park were already Minnesota public land. Private owners of the remaining acreage willingly sold to the state, and development began immediately. The campground, picnic area, and roads were in place by October 1961. Conrad L. Wirth, director of the National Park Service, gave the keynote address at Bear Head Lake State Park's dedication on June 26, 1962. Some property at the south end of Bear Head Lake was added in 1963. The Parks & Trails Council of Minnesota secured an additional 116 acres (47 ha) in the early 2000s.

=== "America's Favorite Park" ===
In September 2010 Bear Head Lake State Park was the unlikely winner of the inaugural "America Is Your Park" internet poll. More than 5.7 million votes were tallied in the contest sponsored by the Coca-Cola Company's Live Positively charitable campaign and the National Park Foundation. Users were invited to vote as many times as they liked for any U.S. national, state, or municipal park to receive $100,000 and the title "America's Favorite Park." Over 1.6 million votes were cast for Bear Head Lake, easily besting runner-up Great Smoky Mountains National Park by more than half a million. This was an impressive showing for a park with an annual attendance of about 100,000, not even ranking in Minnesota's top ten state parks for overnight visits.

The win was credited in part to support from online fans of Lily and Hope, mother and cub black bears featured in a popular webcam by biologist Lynn Rogers of the North American Bear Center in Ely. Some of his research bears dwell in the park. Tipped off by Rogers, many of the bears' 200,000 Facebook and webcam fans promoted the contest as a viral phenomenon. Internet activism by Lily followers had won other online grants and contests benefiting the Ely community.

An oversize check was presented to the Minnesota Department of Natural Resources in a ceremony at their headquarters in St. Paul. DNR officials said the money would go toward a trail center at Bear Head Lake State Park. This long-desired amenity will provide an all-season gathering place for visitors. Lily fans made another strong showing for the second "America's Favorite Park" poll, boosting nearby Soudan Underground Mine State Park to a second-place win and $50,000 prize in 2011.

== Recreation ==
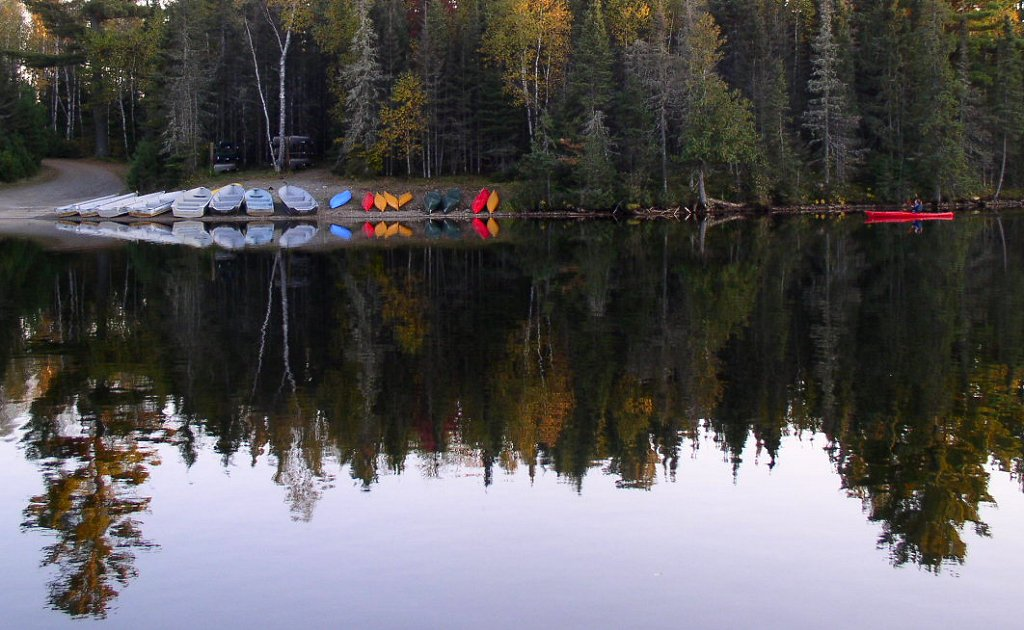
Rental watercraft near the Bear Head Lake boat ramp

Bear Head Lake State Park mixes the North Woods scenery of the Boundary Waters Canoe Area Wilderness (BWCAW) with modern access and amenities. As such it has been described as an "entry-level taste" of the BWCAW. It is especially known for its fishing and canoeing opportunities.

Bear Head and Eagles Nest Lake No. 3 have boat ramps. Bear Head is also developed with a sandy swimming beach, canoe launch, and handicapped-accessible fishing pier. Both large lakes support northern pike, walleye, black basses, black crappie, and panfish, while Norberg and Cub Lakes are stocked with brook trout.

The park's various overnight options are all convenient to a lakeshore. The drive-in campground has 73 sites—45 of which have electrical hookups—and five camper cabins, plus showers, flush toilets, and a dump station. A rental guesthouse offers a full kitchen and heating/air conditioning for up to 10. A secluded group camp accommodates up to 50 tenters. Scattered elsewhere in the park are six backcountry campsites catering to backpackers or boaters.

The park's modest trail system totals 17 miles (27 km). Much of Bear Head Lake State Park is inaccessible by trail. In winter 9 miles (14 km) are groomed for cross-country skiing, while the rest of the park is open to snowshoeing. The 165-mile (266 km) Taconite State Trail and a 1-mile (1.6 km) spur to the picnic area provide a snowmobile route through the park.
