= Northeast St. Louis, Minnesota =

Unorganized territory in St. Louis County, Minnesota, United States

Coordinates: 48°05′04″N 92°08′13″W

- Unorganized territory
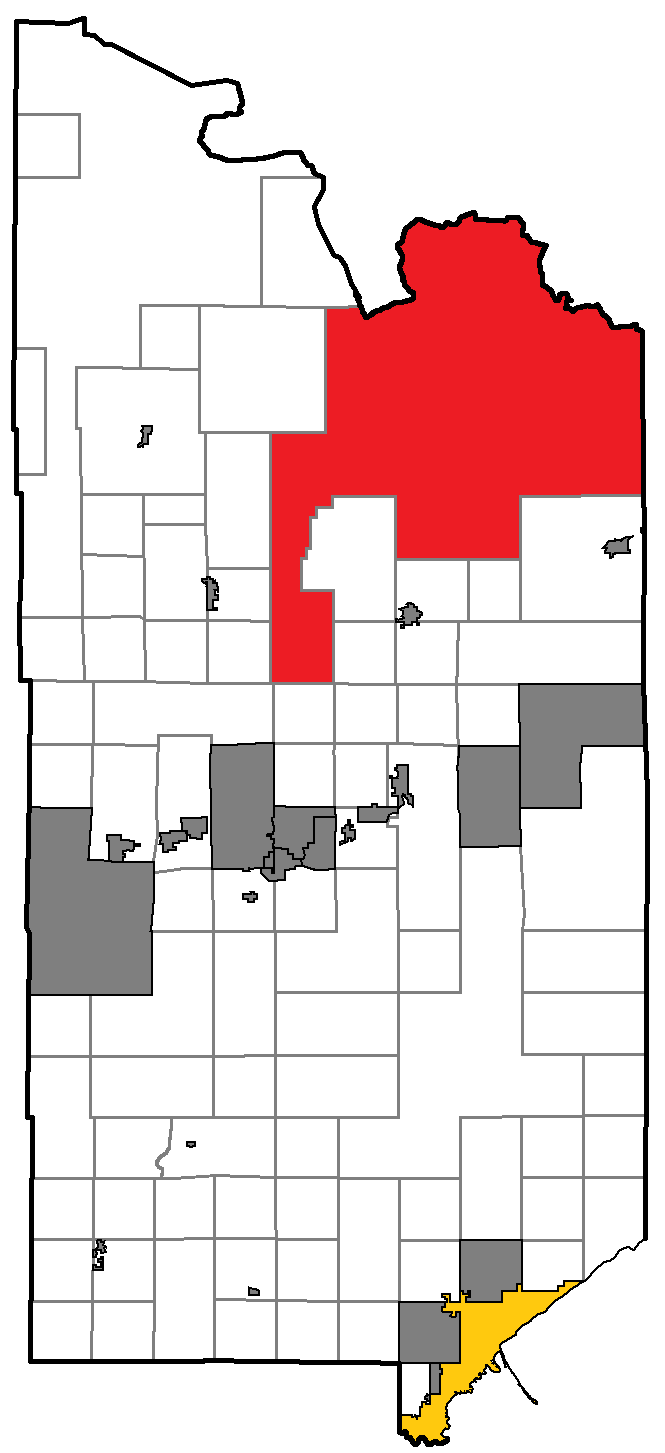
- Location of Northeast St. Louis within St. Louis County, Minnesota
- Country: United States
- State: Minnesota
- County: St. Louis

Area
  - Total: 837.56 sq mi (2,169.3 km^{2})
  - Land: 740.33 sq mi (1,917.4 km^{2})
  - Water: 97.23 sq mi (251.8 km^{2})

Population (2020)
  - Total: 305
  - Density: 0.412/sq mi (0.159/km^{2})
- Time zone: UTC-6 (Central (CST))
  - Summer (DST): UTC-5 (CDT)
- Area code: 218

Northeast St. Louis is an unorganized territory in Saint Louis County, Minnesota, United States. The population was 305 at the 2020 census.

The unorganized territory previously included the separate census subdivisions of Angleworm Lake, Crab Lake, Pfeiffer Lake, Picket Lake, Slim Lake, and Sunday Lake, which were merged into Northeast St. Louis before the 2010 Census.

== Geography ==
According to the United States Census Bureau, the unorganized territory has a total area of 540.1 square miles (1,398.8 km^{2}); 459.8 square miles (1,190.9 km^{2}) is land and 80.3 square miles (208.0 km^{2}) (14.87%) is water.

== Demographics ==
At the 2000 United States census there were 177 people, 81 households, and 57 families living in the unorganized territory. The population density was 0.4 inhabitants per square mile (0.15/km^{2}). There were 402 housing units at an average density of 0.9 per square mile (0.35/km^{2}). The racial makeup of the unorganized territory was 94.92% White, 3.39% Native American, and 1.69% from two or more races. Of the 81 households 21.0% had children under the age of 18 living with them, 59.3% were married couples living together, 4.9% had a female householder with no husband present, and 28.4% were non-families. 23.5% of households were one person and 3.7% were one person aged 65 or older. The average household size was 2.19 and the average family size was 2.47.

The age distribution was 19.2% under the age of 18, 2.8% from 18 to 24, 17.5% from 25 to 44, 42.9% from 45 to 64, and 17.5% 65 or older. The median age was 50 years. For every 100 females, there were 113.3 males. For every 100 females age 18 and over, there were 110.3 males.

The median household income was $40,990 and the median family income was $41,406. Males had a median income of $39,464 versus $20,625 for females. The per capita income for the unorganized territory was $17,631. About 3.0% of families and 7.8% of the population were below the poverty line, including 18.2% of those under the age of eighteen and none of those sixty five or over.
