= Minnesota State Highway 169 =

State highway in Minnesota, United States

Trunk Highway 169
- MN 169 highlighted in red

Route information
- Maintained by MnDOT
- Length: 48.853 mi (78.621 km)
- Existed: April 22, 1933–present

Major junctions
- South end: US 53 at Wuori Township, north of Virginia
- MN 1 at Vermilion Lake Township; MN 135 at Tower; MN 1 at Ely
- North end: CR 18 at Fall Lake Township

Location
- Country: United States
- State: Minnesota
- Counties: St. Louis, Lake

Highway system
- Minnesota Trunk Highway System; Interstate; US; State; Legislative; Scenic
← US 169	→ MN 171

Minnesota State Highway 169 (MN 169) is a 48.853-mile-long (78.621 km) highway in northeast Minnesota, which runs from its interchange with U.S. Highway 53 in Wuori Township (immediately north of the city of Virginia) and continues northeast to its northern terminus at the intersection of Lake County Road 18 and Power Dam Road in Fall Lake Township (6-miles east of Ely). State Highway 169 becomes Lake County Road 18 at this point.

State Highway 169 is numbered as an extension of U.S. Highway 169, using the same mileage that began at the Iowa state line.

The route runs concurrent with State Highway 1 for 26 miles (42 km) from Vermilion Lake Township (west of Tower) to Ely.

== Route description ==
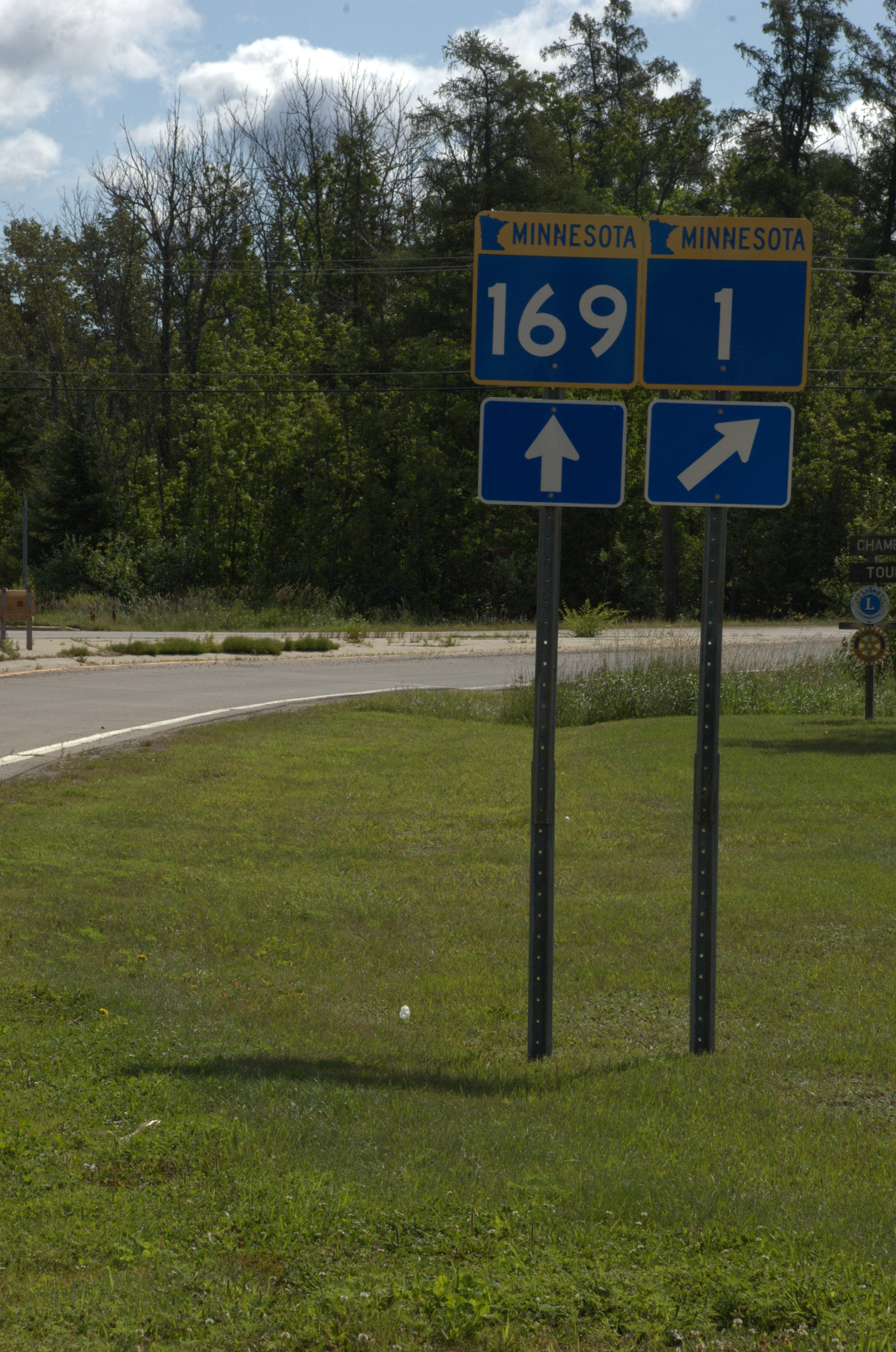
Intersection of Highways 1 and 169 in Ely

State Highway 169 serves as a north–south route in northeast Minnesota between the cities of Virginia, Tower, Ely, and Winton.

The route passes through the Superior National Forest at two different points.

Soudan Underground Mine State Park is located near State Highway 169, two miles east of Tower.

Bear Head Lake State Park is located 7 miles south of the junction of State Highway 169 and County Road 128 (in Eagles Nest Township, 9 miles east of Tower). The park entrance is located on County Road 128.

State Highway 169 is one of three Minnesota state marked highways to carry the same number as an existing U.S. marked highway within the state, the others being Highways 61 and 65.

== History ==
State Highway 169 was numbered as an extension of U.S. 169.

The route was authorized on April 22, 1933 from the city of Virginia to the junction with Highway 135 (formerly 35) in Tower, where the highway terminated until 1953.

The six-mile (10 km) segment running from Ely to Fall Lake Township was authorized in 1949 and originally designated State Highway 221 until 1953, when State Highway 169 was extended over State Highway 1 to Ely.

Highway 169 was paved by 1940. The segment east of Ely was paved by 1950.

== Major intersections ==
County	Location	mi	km	Destinations	Notes
St. Louis	Wuori Township	368.026– 368.246	592.280– 592.634	US 53 – Virginia, Duluth, International Falls	Interchange
St. Louis	Peyla	385.366	620.186	MN 1 west – Cook	West end of MN 1 overlap
St. Louis	Peyla	385.461	620.339	CSAH 77 (Angus Road) – Vermilion Lake Reservation	Former MN 1 west
St. Louis	Tower	389.468	626.788	MN 135 south – Aurora	
St. Louis	Ely	412.690	664.160	MN 1 east – Isabella, MN 61	East end of MN 1 overlap
Lake	Fall Lake Township	416.889	670.918	Power Dam Road / CSAH 18 (Fernberg Road)	Northern terminus; roadway continues as Fernberg Road
1.000 mi = 1.609 km; 1.000 km = 0.621 mi: Concurrency terminus
