= Lindford, Minnesota =

Unincorporated community in Minnesota, United States

Lindford
- Unincorporated community
- Location within Minnesota Location within the United States
- Coordinates: 48°24′39″N 93°46′55″W
- Country: United States
- State: Minnesota
- County: Koochiching
- Elevation: 1,129 ft (344 m)
- Time zone: UTC-6 (Central (CST))
  - Summer (DST): UTC-5 (CDT)
- ZIP code: 56653
- Area code: 218
- GNIS feature ID: 654798

Lindford is an unincorporated community in Koochiching County, Minnesota, United States.

The community is located west of Littlefork at the intersection of County Roads 1 and 13.

Lindford is located along the boundary line between Rainy Lake Unorganized Territory and Northwest Koochiching Unorganized Territory.

Nearby places include Littlefork, Loman, and Pelland. Lindford is located 11 miles west of Littlefork; and 13 miles south of Loman.

Lindford is 28 miles southwest of International Falls.

The Big Fork River flows through the community. Lindford is located within ZIP code 56653 based in Littlefork. The community is located on the edge of the Pine Island State Forest.

== History ==
A post office called Lindford was established in 1905, and remained in operation until 1931. The community derives its name from the first postmaster, A.L. Lindvall.
