= Big Bog State Recreation Area =

State park in Minnesota

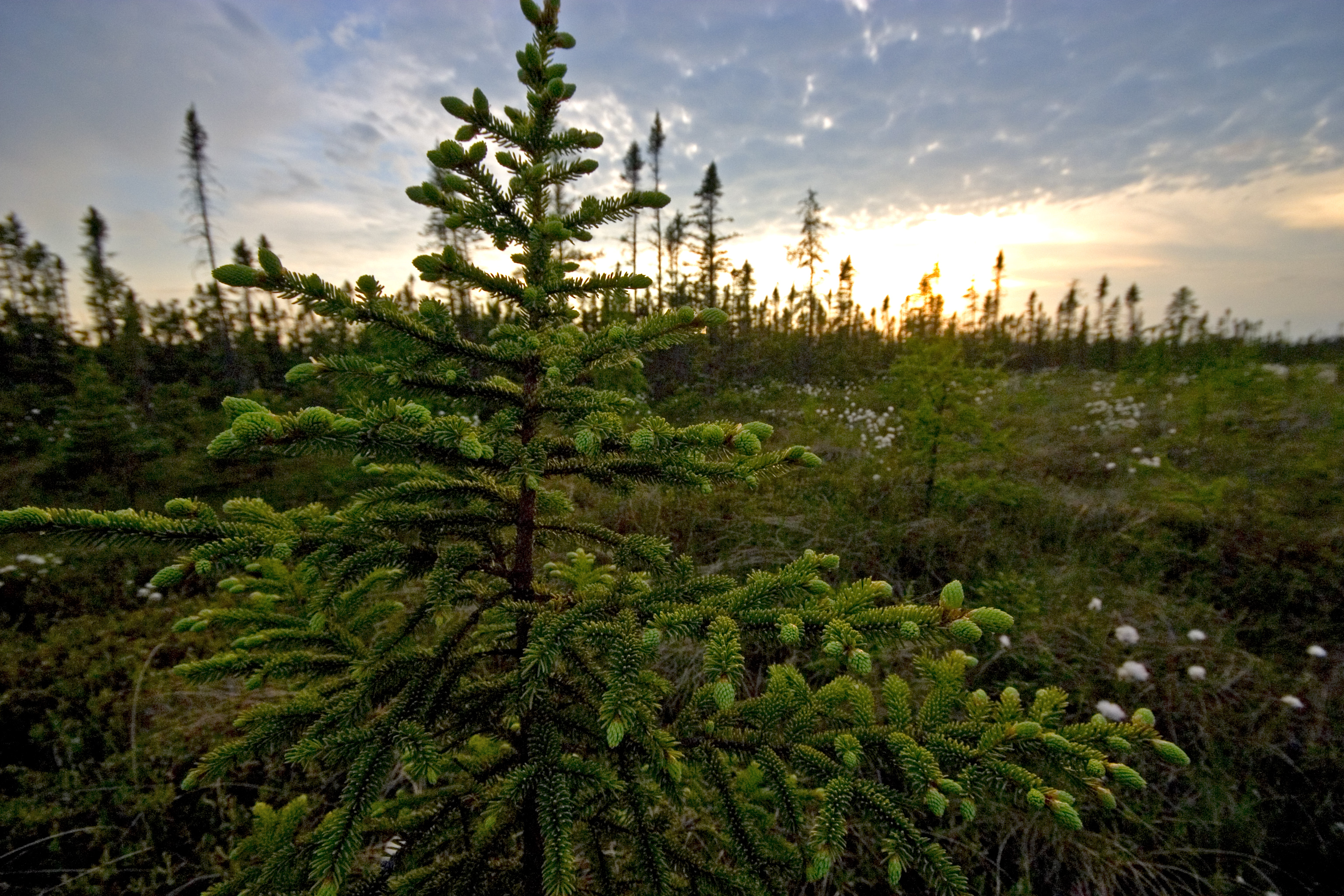
- Big Bog State Recreation Area

- Location within Minnesota Location within the United States
- Location: Beltrami, Minnesota, United States
- Coordinates: 48°11′34″N 94°30′43″W
- Area: 9,459 acres (38.28 km^{2})
- Established: 2006
- Governing body: Minnesota Department of Natural Resources

Big Bog State Recreation Area, a recent addition to the Minnesota state park system, is located on Minnesota State Highway 72, north of Waskish, Minnesota. It covers 9,459 acres (38.3 km^{2}), primarily swamps, bogs, and upland "islands".

The park was started by local grassroots efforts in 2002, it became a state recreation area and officially opened in June 2006.

The "Big Bog" is composed mostly of wetlands. The name was not widely used but had shown up previously in maps, such as by the National Geographic Society. The greater Big Bog region stretches from jackpine forests north of Upper Red Lake in Beltrami County, Minnesota and Lake of the Woods County, Minnesota to the communities along U.S. Route 71 leading to International Falls (Mizpah, Gemmell, Margie, Big Falls, and Littlefork) in Koochiching County, Minnesota. This includes much of the Pine Island State Forest and two National Natural Areas: Upper Red Lake Peatland, and the Lost River Peatland. It is also almost entirely unpopulated, except for the town of Waskish along Highway 72.

== Flora and Fauna ==
Common trees include tamarack, tag alder, cedar, diamond willow, black and white spruce, jackpine, and green ash and black ash with paper birch, "popple" or quaking aspen, white and red pines in the uplands. There are numerous rare plants, including carnivorous sundews and pitcher plants. Animals include bald eagles, timber wolves, black bears, white-tailed deer, and moose.

== History ==
The Big Bog sits on the southeast side of glacial Lake Agassiz, formed during the last ice age. This former lake bottom is quite flat, with occasional hills of gravel deposits or rock. As the lake drained, this area slowly filled in with wetland plants and animals. The Anishinaabe gathered blueberries, fished, and hunted game here until the late 19th century. In the 1920s and 1930s virtually all areas in the vicinity had their majestic old growth pine trees cut down as a massive logging effort swept through, but because of the swampy nature and lack of large stands of mature pines, the Big Bog area was relatively untouched. (Also see the Lost Forty in the Chippewa National Forest). Some efforts have been made to drain portions or harvest the peat, but met with little success. Scattered communities of mixed farming were relocated from some of the more remote areas during rural reform as part of the Rural Electrification Act during the 1930s and 1940s. The fishing-dependent community suffered after a disastrous fall in walleyed pike or walleye (Sander vitreus) population in both basins of Upper and Lower Red Lakes during the 1990s. In 2002 members of the Upper Red Lake Area Association pushed the idea of a new state park, soon after nearly 10,000 acres (40 km^{2}) were classified as the Big Bog State Recreation Area.

== Bog Walk ==
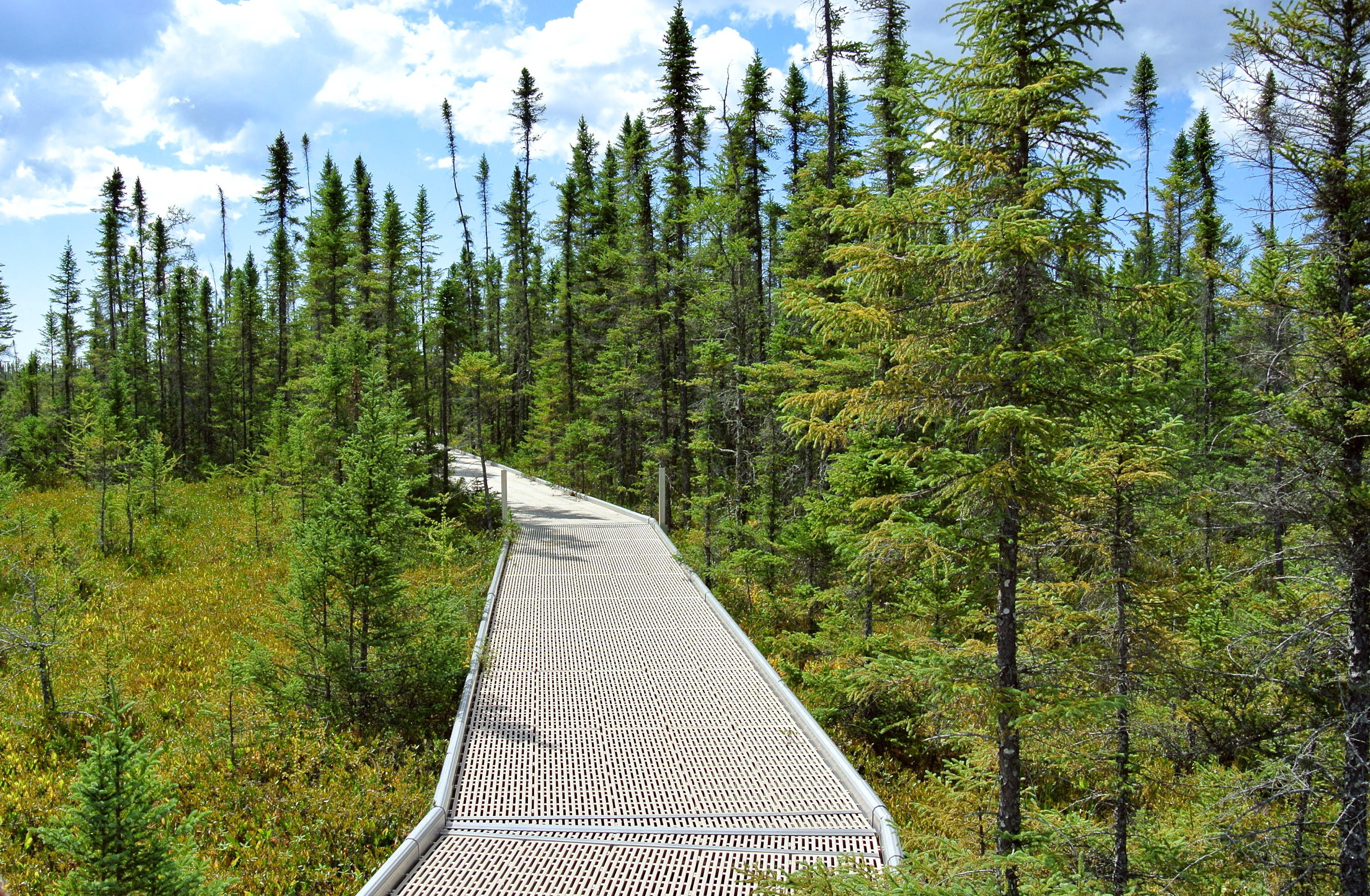
Boardwalk in the Big Bog State Recreation Area, near Waskish, Minnesota

A recent addition to the Big Bog State Recreation Area is a raised boardwalk across the bog which allows visitors to explore one mile (1.6 km) into the "islands" of spruce within the bog, as well as the open wetlands. The boardwalk was designed to allow up to 37% of natural sunlight to fall through, allowing delicate bog plants to continue to grow under the walkway. Numerous signs identify aspects of the bog, including pitcher plants and an early failed attempt at draining the swamp lands. A parking pass needs to be purchased at the nature center nine miles south, on the northern side of the town of Waskish.

== Natural Landmark designation ==
The greater Big Bog area includes the Upper Red Lake Peatland, a National Natural Landmark under the Historic Sites Act. It received this designation in May 1975 from the United States Secretary of the Interior, giving it recognition as an outstanding example of the nation's natural history. The designation describes it as

One of the largest peatlands remaining in the conterminous United States, illustrating a variety of geological features and plant associations, especially the dominant and rare string bog. An outstanding habitat for wildlife including endangered species.

Also included in the greater Big Bog area is the Lost River Peatland, a designated Scientific and Natural Area for the state of Minnesota. It was designated in 1991. It is also an Audubon Important Bird Area, and contains the largest number of rare plant species of any peatland in Minnesota.
