= Pinetop, Minnesota =

Unincorporated community in Minnesota, United States

Pinetop
- Unincorporated community
- Location within Minnesota Location within the United States
- Coordinates: 47°54′21″N 94°06′07″W
- Country: United States
- State: Minnesota
- County: Koochiching
- Elevation: 1,342 ft (409 m)
- Time zone: UTC-6 (Central (CST))
  - Summer (DST): UTC-5 (CDT)
- ZIP code: 56660 and 56661
- Area code: 218
- GNIS feature ID: 657853

Pinetop is an unincorporated community in Koochiching County, Minnesota, United States; located within the Pine Island State Forest. The community is located east of Mizpah; and south of Gemmell; along Koochiching County Road 6 (CR 6).

County Roads 12 and 25; and State Highway 1 (MN 1) are also nearby. The center of Pinetop is generally considered near the intersection of Koochiching County Road 6 and Town Road 379.

Caldwell Brook and Pancake Creek both flow through the community.

Pinetop is located within Northome Unorganized Territory. Nearby places include Mizpah, Northome, Gemmell, and Wildwood. Pinetop is located seven miles east of Mizpah and is nine miles east of Northome; and 68 miles southwest of International Falls.

ZIP codes 56660 (Mizpah) and 56661 (Northome) meet at Pinetop.

The community was named for a single tall white pine tree.
