= Margie, Minnesota =

Unincorporated community in Minnesota, United States

Margie
- Unincorporated community
- Location within Minnesota Location within the United States
- Coordinates: 48°05′43″N 93°56′24″W
- Country: United States
- State: Minnesota
- County: Koochiching
- Elevation: 1,273 ft (388 m)
- Time zone: UTC-6 (Central (CST))
  - Summer (DST): UTC-5 (CDT)
- ZIP code: 56658
- Area code: 218
- GNIS feature ID: 647519

Margie is an unincorporated community in Koochiching County, Minnesota, United States; located near Big Falls.

The community is located between Northome and Big Falls on U.S. Highway 71.

Dinner Creek flows through the community. Margie is located within the Pine Island State Forest.

== Geography ==
Margie is located near the boundary line between South Koochiching Unorganized Territory and Northwest Koochiching Unorganized Territory.

Nearby places include Big Falls, Northome, and Mizpah.

Margie is located nine miles southwest of Big Falls and 22 miles northeast of Northome. Margie is 29 miles southwest of Littlefork and 48 miles southwest of International Falls.

== History ==
Margie was a station of the Northern Pacific Railroad, now the Blue Ox Trail. A post office was established in November 1903, and named for the daughter of postmaster Westley Horton, the post office being located in their store. It was located at a site on high land between two swamps. There were several stores and a sawmill. The original post office operated until 1985.
