= Forest Grove, Minnesota =

Unincorporated community in Minnesota, United States

Forest Grove
- Unincorporated community
- Location within Minnesota Location within the United States
- Coordinates: 47°58′36″N 94°13′53″W
- Country: United States
- State: Minnesota
- County: Koochiching
- Elevation: 1,365 ft (416 m)
- Time zone: UTC-6 (Central (CST))
  - Summer (DST): UTC-5 (CDT)
- ZIP code: 56660
- Area code: 218
- GNIS feature ID: 656295

Forest Grove is an unincorporated community in Koochiching County, Minnesota, United States; located within the Pine Island State Forest. The community is located north of Mizpah and west of Gemmell, along Koochiching County Road 17 (CR 17).

U.S. Highway 71 and County Road 36 are also nearby. The center of Forest Grove is generally considered at the intersection of County Roads 17, 58, and 150.

Forest Grove is located within ZIP code 56660, based in Mizpah.

== Geography ==
Forest Grove is located within Northome Unorganized Territory. Nearby places include Mizpah, Northome, Gemmell, and Kelliher. Forest Grove is located four miles north of Mizpah. Forest Grove is nine miles north of Northome and 69 miles southwest of International Falls.

The former township of Forest Grove, which was dissolved in 1950, had been located in the same vicinity as the community of Forest Grove.
