= Wildwood, Minnesota =

Unincorporated community in Minnesota US

Wildwood
- Unincorporated community
- Location within Minnesota Location within the United States
- Coordinates: 47°53′26″N 93°58′01″W
- Country: United States
- State: Minnesota
- County: Koochiching
- Elevation: 1,332 ft (406 m)
- Time zone: UTC-6 (Central (CST))
  - Summer (DST): UTC-5 (CDT)
- ZIP code: 56661
- Area code: 218
- GNIS feature ID: 659009

Wildwood is an unincorporated community in Koochiching County, Minnesota, United States; located within the Pine Island State Forest.

The community is located between Northome and Effie; near the junction of State Highway 1 (MN 1) and County Road 27. The boundary line between Koochiching and Itasca counties is nearby. Wildwood is located within ZIP code 56661 based in Northome.

Wildwood is located along the boundary line between South Koochiching Unorganized Territory and Northome Unorganized Territory. Caldwell Brook flows through the community.

Nearby places include Northome, Mizpah, Effie, and Bigfork. Wildwood is located 15 miles east of Northome. Wildwood is 18 miles west of Effie; and 74 miles southwest of International Falls.
