= Indus, Minnesota =

Unincorporated community in Minnesota, United States

Indus
- Unincorporated community
- Location within Minnesota Location within the United States
- Coordinates: 48°37′31″N 93°50′16″W
- Country: United States
- State: Minnesota
- County: Koochiching
- Elevation: 1,106 ft (337 m)
- Time zone: UTC-6 (Central (CST))
  - Summer (DST): UTC-5 (CDT)
- ZIP code: 56623 or 56629
- Area code: 218
- GNIS feature ID: 645426

Indus is an unincorporated community in Koochiching County, Minnesota, United States.

The community is located between International Falls and Baudette on State Highway 11 (MN 11).

Indus is located within Northwest Koochiching Unorganized Territory.

County Road 83, Town Road 297, and the Rainy River are all in the vicinity.

Nearby places include Birchdale, Loman, and Emo. Indus is located 30 miles west of International Falls; and 38 miles east of Baudette.

Until 2023 Indus had a school called Indus School which served as a K-12 Outdoor Education Magnet School kids in the area now go to Northome School

== History ==
A post office called Indus was established in 1902, and remained in operation until 1974. The community was named after the Indus River in Asia.
