= Ericsburg, Minnesota =

Unincorporated community in Minnesota, United States

Ericsburg
- Unincorporated community
- Location within Minnesota Location within the United States
- Coordinates: 48°29′16″N 93°19′53″W
- Country: United States
- State: Minnesota
- County: Koochiching
- Elevation: 1,122 ft (342 m)
- Time zone: UTC-6 (Central (CST))
  - Summer (DST): UTC-5 (CDT)
- ZIP code: 56669 and 56649
- Area code: 218
- GNIS feature ID: 656165

Ericsburg is an unincorporated community in Koochiching County, Minnesota, United States.

The community is located southeast of International Falls at the junction of U.S. Highway 53 and County Road 98.

Ericsburg is located within Rainy Lake Unorganized Territory.

Nearby places include International Falls, Ray, and Kabetogama. Ericsburg is located nine miles southeast of International Falls and 15 miles northwest of Kabetogama. The Rat Root River flows through the community.

ZIP codes 56669 (Ray / Kabetogama) and 56649 (International Falls) meet near Ericsburg.

== History ==
Ericsburg was founded by a real estate agent named Erik Franson, for whom the community is named. A post office called Ericsburg was established in 1907, and remained in operation until 1966.
