= Ray, Minnesota =

Unincorporated community in Minnesota, United States

Ray
- Unincorporated community
- Location within Minnesota Location within the United States
- Coordinates: 48°24′39″N 93°12′38″W
- Country: United States
- State: Minnesota
- County: Koochiching
- Elevation: 1,158 ft (353 m)
- Time zone: UTC-6 (Central (CST))
  - Summer (DST): UTC-5 (CDT)
- ZIP code: 56669
- Area code: 218
- GNIS feature ID: 657994

Ray is an unincorporated community in Koochiching County, Minnesota, United States.

The community is located southeast of International Falls at the junction of U.S. Highway 53 (U.S. 53) and State Highway 217 (MN 217).

County Roads 3, 29, and 110 are also in the vicinity. The Rat Root River flows through the area.

== Geography ==
Ray is located along the boundary line between East Koochiching Unorganized Territory and Rainy Lake Unorganized Territory.

Nearby places include International Falls, Littlefork, and Kabetogama. The boundary line between Koochiching and Saint Louis counties is nearby.

Ray is 18 miles southeast of International Falls, 16 miles east of Littlefork, nine miles west of Kabetogama and 54 miles northwest of Cook.

== History ==
The Ray post office was established in 1907, and remained in operation until 1994. The community was named for Edwin Ray Lewis, a surveyor and lumberman.
