= Frontier, Minnesota =

Unincorporated community in Minnesota, United States

Frontier
- Unincorporated community
- Location within Minnesota Location within the United States
- Coordinates: 48°39′23″N 94°15′24″W
- Country: United States
- State: Minnesota
- County: Koochiching
- Elevation: 1,076 ft (328 m)
- Time zone: UTC-6 (Central (CST))
  - Summer (DST): UTC-5 (CDT)
- ZIP code: 56623
- Area code: 218
- GNIS feature ID: 654716

Frontier is an unincorporated community in Koochiching County, Minnesota, United States, located along the Rainy River.

The community is located between International Falls and Baudette on State Highway 11 (MN 11). Frontier is located within Northwest Koochiching Unorganized Territory.

The Rainy River and Whitefish Creek meet at Frontier.

Frontier is located 18 miles east of Baudette and 50 miles west of International Falls. Frontier is seven miles west of Birchdale.

Frontier is located within ZIP code 56623, based in Baudette.
