= Gemmell, Minnesota =

Unincorporated community in Minnesota, United States

Gemmell
- Unincorporated community
- Location within Minnesota Location within the United States
- Coordinates: 47°58′24″N 94°07′26″W
- Country: United States
- State: Minnesota
- County: Koochiching
- Elevation: 1,348 ft (411 m)
- Time zone: UTC-6 (Central (CST))
  - Summer (DST): UTC-5 (CDT)
- ZIP code: 56660
- Area code: 218
- GNIS feature ID: 656363

Gemmell is an unincorporated community in Koochiching County, Minnesota, United States; located near Mizpah and Northome.

The community is located between Northome and Big Falls at the junction of County Roads 12 and 25; and U.S. Highway 71.

Gemmell is located within ZIP code 56660 based in Mizpah.

Clear Lake and Dark Lake are in the vicinity. Gemmell is located within the Pine Island State Forest.

== Geography ==
Gemmell is located within Northome Unorganized Territory. Nearby places include Mizpah, Northome, Kelliher, and Margie.

Gemmell is located 10 miles northeast of Northome; and 21 miles southwest of Big Falls. Gemmell is 52 miles northeast of Bemidji; and 60 miles southwest of International Falls.

== History ==
A post office called Gemmell was established in 1905, and remained in operation until 1974. The community was named for W. H. Gemmell, a railroad official.
