= Minnesota State Highway 217 =

State highway in Minnesota, United States

Trunk Highway 217
- MN 217 highlighted in red

Route information
- Maintained by MnDOT
- Length: 17.342 mi (27.909 km)
- Existed: July 1, 1949–present

Major junctions
- West end: MN 65 at Littlefork
- East end: US 53 at Ray

Location
- Country: United States
- State: Minnesota
- Counties: Koochiching

Highway system
- Minnesota Trunk Highway System; Interstate; US; State; Legislative; Scenic
← US 212	→ US 218

Minnesota State Highway 217 (MN 217) is a 17.342-mile-long (27.909 km) highway in northern Minnesota, which runs from its intersection with State Highway 65 at Littlefork and continues east to its eastern terminus at its intersection with U.S. Highway 53 at Ray. MN 217 passes through the city of Littlefork.

== Route description ==
Highway 217 serves as an east–west route between Littlefork and Ray near International Falls.

The route is also known as Main Street in Littlefork.

Highway 217 crosses the Little Fork River and the Rat Root River throughout its route.

The western terminus for Highway 217 is its intersection with State Highway 65 in Littlefork, 8 blocks from U.S. Highway 71.

== History ==
Highway 217 was authorized on July 1, 1949.

The route was paved before 1960.

== Major intersections ==
The entire highway is in Koochiching County.

Location	mi	km	Destinations	Notes
Littlefork	0.000	0.000	MN 65 – Nashwauk, International Falls	
Littlefork	0.086– 0.170	0.138– 0.274	Little Fork River Bridge	
Littlefork	0.383	0.616	CR 49 (3rd Avenue)	
Littlefork	0.452	0.727	CR 43 (4th Avenue)	
Littlefork	0.888	1.429	CR 22 north / CR 43 south (Aspen Street)	
Rainy Lake	1.811	2.915	CR 8	
East Koochiching	10.402– 10.420	16.740– 16.769	Rat Root River Bridge	
East Koochiching	15.334	24.678	CR 29	
East Koochiching	16.980	27.327	CR 110	
Ray	17.342	27.909	US 53 – Virginia, International Falls	
1.000 mi = 1.609 km; 1.000 km = 0.621 mi
