= Central, Minnesota =

Unincorporated community in Minnesota, United States

Central
- Unincorporated community
- Location within Minnesota Location within the United States
- Coordinates: 48°41′58″N 94°20′35″W
- Country: United States
- State: Minnesota
- County: Koochiching
- Elevation: 1,089 ft (332 m)
- Time zone: UTC-6 (Central (CST))
  - Summer (DST): UTC-5 (CDT)
- ZIP code: 56623
- Area code: 218
- GNIS feature ID: 654639

Central is an unincorporated community in Koochiching County, Minnesota, United States; located in the northwest corner of the county; along the Rainy River.

The community is located between International Falls and Baudette on State Highway 11 (MN 11). Central is located within Northwest Koochiching Unorganized Territory. Central is located 12 miles east of Baudette; and 56 miles west of International Falls. Central is 13 miles west of Birchdale.

Central is located within ZIP code 56623 based in Baudette. A post office had operated in the community of Central from 1909 to 1928.

The boundary line between Koochiching and Lake of the Woods counties is nearby.
