= Pelland, Minnesota =

Unincorporated community in Minnesota, United States

Pelland
- Unincorporated community
- Location within Minnesota Location within the United States
- Coordinates: 48°31′22″N 93°34′31″W
- Country: United States
- State: Minnesota
- County: Koochiching
- Elevation: 1,115 ft (340 m)
- Time zone: UTC-6 (Central (CST))
  - Summer (DST): UTC-5 (CDT)
- ZIP code: 56649
- Area code: 218
- GNIS feature ID: 649252

Pelland is an unincorporated community in Koochiching County, Minnesota, United States, located along the Rainy River.

The community is located southwest of International Falls at the junction of U.S. Highway 71 (U.S. 71) and State Highway 11 (MN 11).

Pelland is located within Rainy Lake Unorganized Territory.

Nearby places include International Falls, Littlefork, and Loman. Pelland is located 11 miles southwest of International Falls and eight miles north of Littlefork. ZIP codes 56649 (International Falls), 56653 (Littlefork), and 56654 (Loman) all meet near Pelland.

Pelland is also known locally as Pelland Junction or the "Y". The Rainy River, the Big Fork River, and the Little Fork River are all in the vicinity.

== Community ==
Pelland is home to a public water access area for fishing. Local businesses include a convenience store, greenhouse, and a bar.

== History ==
A post office called Pelland was established in 1902, and remained in operation until 1918. Joseph Pelland, the first postmaster, gave the community his name. He was born 22 September 1853 in Joliette, Quebec and died 20 October 1918 in Bellingham, Washington.
