= Fairland, Minnesota =

- Ghost town
- Location within Minnesota Location within the United States
- Coordinates: 48°28′03″N 94°09′17″W
- Country: United States
- State: Minnesota
- County: Koochiching
- Elevation: 1,138 ft (347 m)
- Time zone: UTC-6 (Central (CST))
  - Summer (DST): UTC-5 (CDT)
- GNIS feature ID: 654702

Fairland is a ghost town in Koochiching County, Minnesota, United States, within Northwest Koochiching Unorganized Territory, south of Birchdale. It was located along Black River Road near Fiero Truck Trail.

The community was first settled about 1902. It was first known as Feldman until 1912, named for an early settler. It was known as Fairland from 1912 until 1936, named after Fjaarland in Norway. The community had a post office from 1911 to 1936.
