= Jameson, Minnesota =

Unincorporated community in Minnesota, United States

Jameson
- Unincorporated community
- Location within Minnesota Location within the United States
- Coordinates: 48°36′14″N 93°21′58″W
- Country: United States
- State: Minnesota
- County: Koochiching
- Elevation: 1,115 ft (340 m)
- Time zone: UTC-6 (Central (CST))
  - Summer (DST): UTC-5 (CDT)
- ZIP code: 56649
- Area code: 218
- GNIS feature ID: 656771

Jameson is an unincorporated community in Koochiching County, Minnesota, United States. It is a surrounding community of International Falls, located along the Rainy River.

State Highway 11 (MN 11) is the main route through Jameson, connecting it to the cities of International Falls to the west and Ranier to the east.

Jameson is within the unorganized territory of Rainy Lake, which covers the northeastern part of Koochiching County.
