= Grand Falls, Minnesota =

Unincorporated community in Minnesota, United States

Grand Falls
- Unincorporated community
- Location within Minnesota Location within the United States
- Coordinates: 48°11′55″N 93°47′34″W
- Country: United States
- State: Minnesota
- County: Koochiching
- Elevation: 1,227 ft (374 m)

Population
  - Total: 30
- Time zone: UTC-6 (Central (CST))
  - Summer (DST): UTC-5 (CDT)
- ZIP code: 56627
- Area code: 218
- GNIS feature ID: 654732

Grand Falls is an unincorporated community in Koochiching County, Minnesota, United States.

The community is located immediately north of Big Falls at the junction of County Roads 13 and 31; and U.S. Highway 71.

Grand Falls is located within ZIP code 56627, based in Big Falls.

== Geography ==
Grand Falls is located within South Koochiching Unorganized Territory.

Big Falls Municipal Airport is nearby.

The community of Grand Falls is located across the Big Fork River from the city of Big Falls. Grand Falls is also located 38 miles southwest of International Falls.

=== Climate ===
Grand Falls has a warm-summer continental climate. Some applications of Köppen classification place it with a dry season (Dwb, rare in the American continent, most common in East Asia) or wet subtype all year round (Dfb), unlike International Falls which is close to Rainy Lake/River that moderates temperatures, the climate is drier and rigorous.

== History ==
A post office was established at Grand Falls from 1906 until 1911. The community took its name from a nearby waterfall.
