= Craigville, Minnesota =

Unincorporated community in Minnesota, United States

Craigville
- Unincorporated community
- Location within Minnesota Location within the United States
- Coordinates: 47°54′11″N 93°36′47″W
- Country: United States
- State: Minnesota
- County: Koochiching
- Elevation: 1,260 ft (380 m)
- Time zone: UTC-6 (Central (CST))
  - Summer (DST): UTC-5 (CDT)
- ZIP code: 56639
- Area code: 218
- GNIS feature ID: 655849

Craigville is an unincorporated community in Koochiching County, Minnesota, United States; it is located within the Koochiching State Forest.

The community is located four miles north of Effie, along County Road 5. The boundary line between Itasca and Koochiching counties is nearby.

Craigville is located within South Koochiching Unorganized Territory. The Big Fork River flows through the community.

Craigville is also located 36 miles east of Northome. Craigville is 67 miles south of International Falls; and 55 miles west of Cook.

== History ==
Craigville was previously a logging village in southern Koochiching County; north of Effie. The community of Craigville consists of section 36 of Township 63N, Range 26W.

Craigville was platted in 1924 by James Reid. It was named for an unknown logging foreman named Craig. Craigville was frequented by as many as 5,000 lumberjacks seasonally; and had a post office from 1915 until 1952. In addition to numerous hotels and saloons, Craigville also had a station of the former Minneapolis and Rainy River Railway.

One of the photos used in the theme song for the television series Cheers (1982–1993) was taken in Craigville in 1937, by photographer Russell Lee of the former Farm Security Administration.
