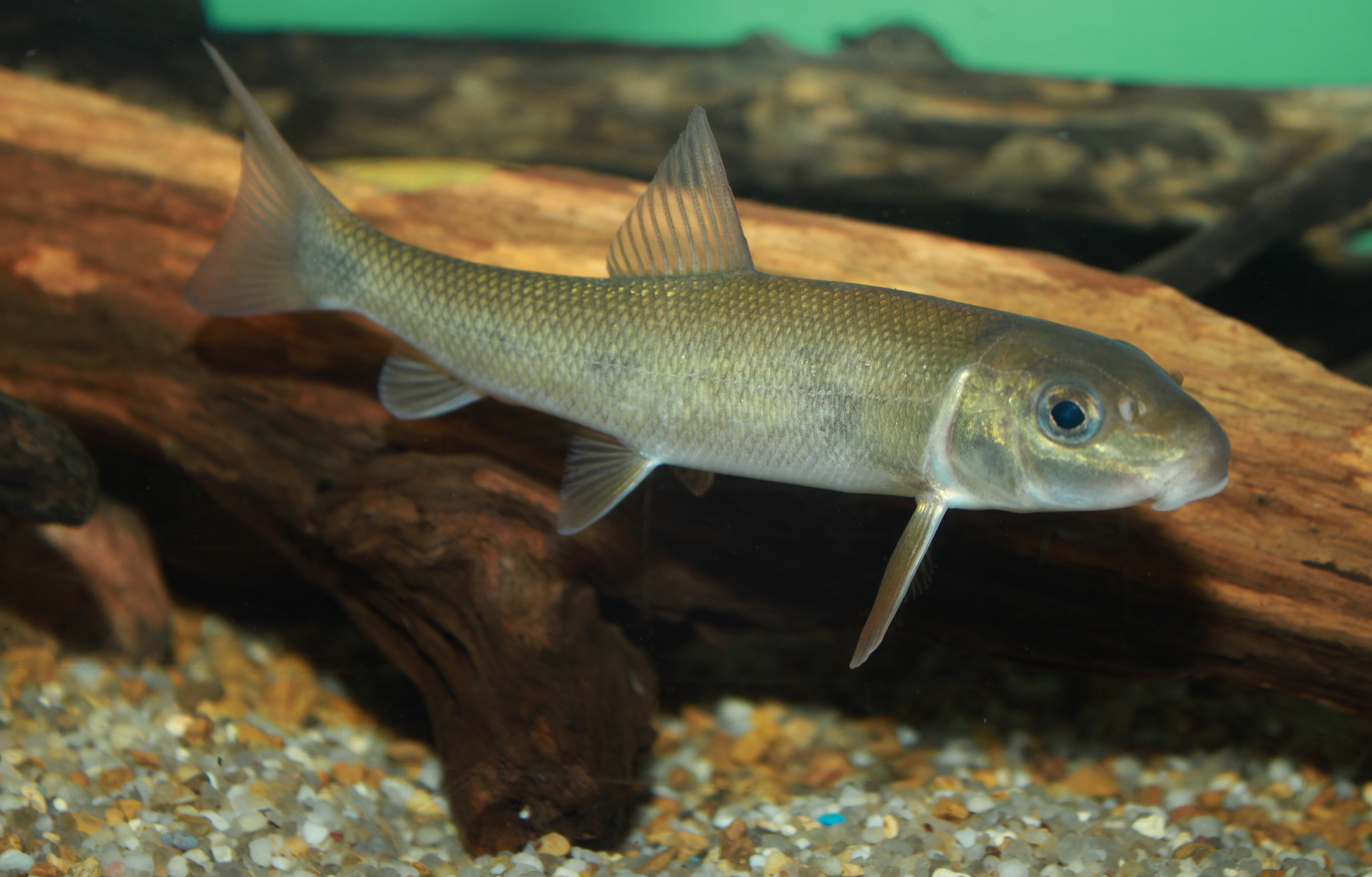

Conservation status
- Least Concern (IUCN 3.1)

Scientific classification
- Kingdom: Animalia
- Phylum: Chordata
- Class: Actinopterygii
- Division: Teleostei
- Order: Cypriniformes
- Family: Catostomidae
- Genus: Catostomus
- Species: C. commersonii

Binomial name
- Catostomus commersonii (Lacépède, 1803)
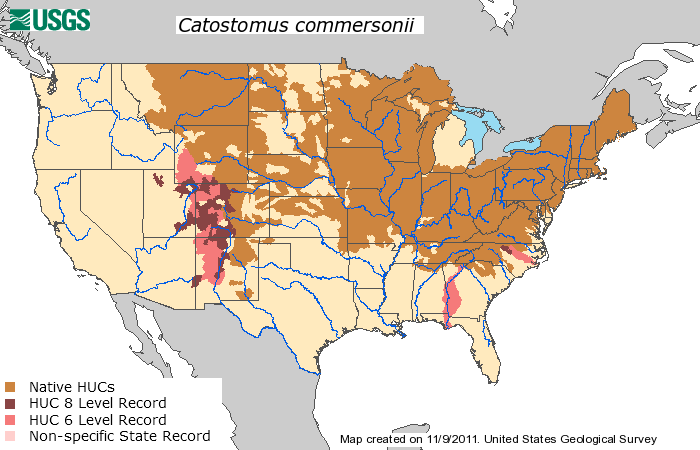
- Distribution in the United States (also occurs in Canada)

Synonyms
- List: Cyprinus commersonnii Lacepède, 1803; Cyprinus teres Mitchill, 1814; Catostomus bostoniensis Lesueur, 1817; Catostomus communis Lesueur, 1817; Catostomus flexuosus Rafinesque, 1820; Cyprinus reticulatus Richardson, 1836; Catostomus gracilis Kirtland, 1838; Catostomus pallidus DeKay, 1842; Catostomus sucklii Girard, 1856; Catostomus chloropteron Abbott, 1860; Catostomus alticolus Cope, 1874; Moxostoma trisignatum Cope, 1875; Catostomus richardsoni Harper & Nichols, 1919

= White sucker =

White sucker Temporal range: Early Pleistocene to recent

Species of fish

The white sucker (Catostomus commersonii) is a species of freshwater cypriniform fish inhabiting the upper Midwest and Northeast in North America, though it is also found as far south as Georgia and as far west as New Mexico. The fish is commonly known as a "sucker" due to its fleshy, papillose lips that suck up organic matter and aufwuchs from the bottom of rivers and streams.

Other common names for the white sucker include bay fish, brook sucker, common sucker, and mullet. The white sucker is often confused with the longnose sucker (C. catostomus), because they look very similar.

== Etymology ==
The specific name, commersonii, is in honor of French naturalist Philibert Commerson.

== Distribution and habitat ==
The white sucker is highly adaptable to different habitats and changing environmental influences. Generally, the white sucker is found in small streams, rivers, and lakes in the Midwest and East Coast of the United States. The white sucker is also relatively tolerant of turbid and polluted waters. It does, however, have low breeding success in acidified waters, which can be caused by acid rain.

== Description ==
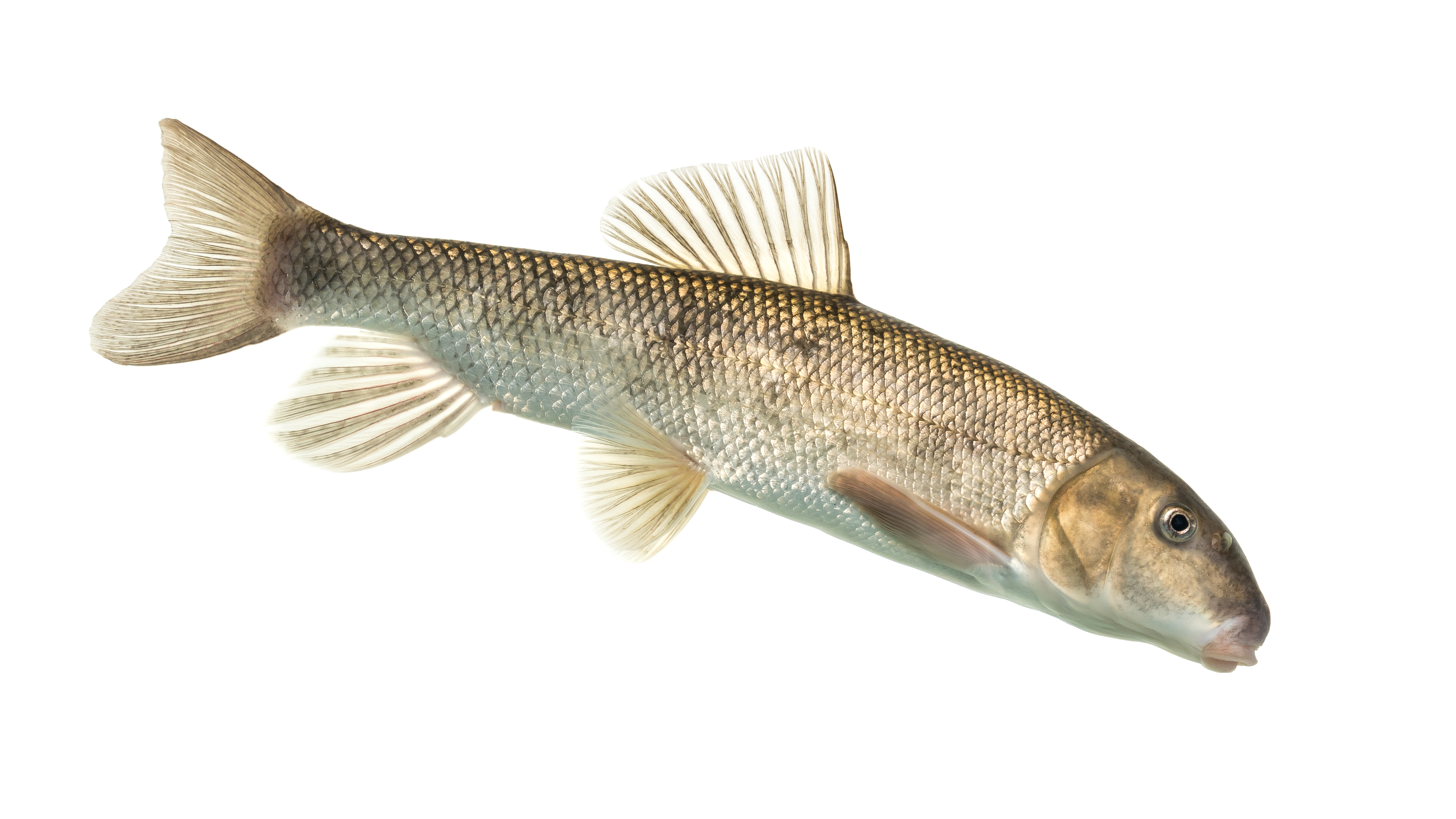
At Gavins Point National Fish Hatchery

The white sucker is a long, round-bodied fish with a dark green, grey, copper, brown, or black back and sides and a light underbelly. The fish also has typical features of primitive Cypriniformes fishes, such as a homocercal tail, cycloid scales, and dorsal, pectoral, and pelvic fin rays. When full grown, it can reach lengths of 12–20 in (30–51 cm) and weigh 2–6 lb (0.91–2.72 kg). The fish's suckermouth, with its fleshy lips, is located in an inferior position at the bottom of its head, as the fish obtains its food from bottom surfaces. The white sucker is often mistaken for different species of suckers and redhorses, but can be distinguished by the complete lateral line system containing 55–85 small scales. The white sucker is able to use chemosensory to sense and avoid predators and other conspecific species during day and night.

== Diet habits ==
The white sucker is a bottom feeder, meaning that it uses its fleshy lips to suck up bottom sediments and other organisms that may be located there. It will eat almost anything it can, but most commonly small invertebrates, algae, and plant matter. Larger predatory fish species such as walleye, trout, bass, northern pike, catfish, muskellunge, and sauger naturally prey on the white sucker.

== Reproduction ==
The white sucker usually spawns in shallow water or streams in April and May; spawning may possibly be initiated by temperature changes and runoff from early snow melt. Two or more males may gather with one female, which releases up to 10,000 eggs that can be fertilized by the gathered males.

== Importance to humans ==
A very common fish, the white sucker is usually not fished for food, though some consider it good to eat. It is most often used as bait; the young are sold as sucker minnows. When it is eaten by humans, it is usually processed and sold under the name of mullet. The IGFA world record for white sucker stands at 6 lb 8 oz (2.9 kg) taken from the Rainy River near Loman, Minnesota in 1984.

== Fossil record ==
Fossils of this fish, C. commersonii, in the United States occur as early as the Early Pleistocene (1.8 million years ago).
