= Craigsville =

Craigsville can refer to a location in the United States:

- Craigsville, Minnesota
- Craigsville, Virginia
- Craigsville, West Virginia
