= Plum Creek (Big Fork River tributary) =

Location
- Country: United States
- States: Minnesota
- Counties: Itasca; Koochiching

Physical characteristics
- Source
  - coordinates: 47.813001°N 93.7557529°W
- Mouth
  - coordinates: 47.9691149°N 93.8174152°W

Plum Creek is a stream in the U.S. state of Minnesota. It is a tributary of the Big Fork River.

Plum Creek was named for the wild plum trees lining its banks.

== See also ==
- List of rivers of Minnesota
