= Lindford =

Lindford may refer to:

- Lindford, Hampshire, England
- Lindford, Minnesota, United States
