= Loman, Minnesota =

Unincorporated community in Minnesota, United States

Loman
- Unincorporated community
- Location within Minnesota Location within the United States
- Coordinates: 48°30′46″N 93°48′11″W
- Country: United States
- State: Minnesota
- County: Koochiching
- Elevation: 1,096 ft (334 m)
- Time zone: UTC-6 (Central (CST))
  - Summer (DST): UTC-5 (CDT)
- ZIP code: 56654
- Area code: 218
- GNIS feature ID: 647004

Loman is an unincorporated community in Koochiching County, Minnesota, United States.

The community is located between International Falls and Baudette at the intersection of State Highway 11 (MN 11) and County Road 32 (Black River Road). Loman is located within Northwest Koochiching Unorganized Territory.

The Rainy River and the Black River meet at Loman. Nearby places include Indus, Pelland, and Littlefork.

Loman is located 21 miles west-southwest of International Falls; and 47 miles east-southeast of Baudette.

A US Post Office has been in operation since 1901. A Miss Jennie Mourhess was the first postmaster.

== History ==
Loman was founded by and named after the pioneer homesteaders George W. Loman and his wife Mary M. McFarland.
