= Grand Falls =

Grand Falls may refer to:

== Canada ==
- Grand Falls, New Brunswick
- Grand Falls-Windsor, Newfoundland and Labrador
- Grand Falls, a former name for Churchill Falls on the Churchill River in Labrador

It can also refer to these Canadian federal or provincial electoral districts:

- Bonavista—Gander—Grand Falls—Windsor federal electoral district in Newfoundland and Labrador
- Gander—Grand Falls former federal electoral district
- Grand Falls-Buchans provincial electoral district of Newfoundland and Labrador
- Grand Falls Region provincial electoral district of New Brunswick

== United States ==
- Grand Falls, Arizona
- Grand Falls Plaza, Missouri
- Grand Falls, Minnesota
