= Pinetop =

Pinetop is a given name. Notable people with the name include:

- Pinetop Perkins (1913–2011), American blues pianist
- Pinetop Smith (1904–1929), American boogie-woogie style blues pianist
- Pinetop Sparks (1910–1935), American blues pianist in St. Louis

== See also ==
- Pinetop Country Club, Arizona, Navajo County, Arizona, United States
- Pinetop-Lakeside, Arizona, town in Navajo County, Arizona, United States
- Pinetop Formation, geologic formation in Oklahoma
- Pinetop, Minnesota, Koochiching County, Minnesota, United States
- Weather at Pinetop, 1964 Australian television short which aired on ABC
- Pinetop Seven, American band from Chicago, Illinois
