= Forest Grove =

Forest Grove may refer to:

== Australia ==
- Forest Grove, Western Australia, locality in the Shire of Augusta-Margaret River

== Canada ==
- Forest Grove, Saskatoon, a neighborhood of Saskatoon, Saskatchewan

== United States ==
- Forest Grove, Minnesota, an unincorporated community near International Falls, Minnesota
- Forest Grove, Montana, an unincorporated community in Fergus County
- Forest Grove, Oregon, a city near Portland, Oregon
- Forest Grove, Texas, an unincorporated community in Collin County, Texas
- Forest Grove Historic District, Buckingham, Pennsylvania, listed on the NRHP in Pennsylvania
- Forest Grove branch, a railway line in Oregon
