= WDIO-DT =

Television station in Duluth, Minnesota

WDIO-DT and WIRT-DT

WDIO-DT: Duluth, Minnesota; WIRT-DT: Hibbing, Minnesota; United States
- Channels for WDIO-DT: Digital: 10 (VHF); Virtual: 10
- Channels for WIRT-DT: Digital: 13 (VHF); Virtual: 13
- Branding: WDIO

Programming
- Affiliations: 10.1/13.1: ABC; for others, see § Subchannels

Ownership
- Owner: Hubbard Broadcasting; (WDIO-TV, LLC)

History
- First air date: WDIO-DT: January 24, 1966; WIRT-DT: August 31, 1967 (Note: The Broadcasting and Cable Yearbook says September 1, while the Television and Cable Factbook says August 31.)
- Former call signs: WDIO-DT: WDIO-TV (1966–2009); WIRT-DT: WIRT (1967–2009)
- Former channel number: WDIO-DT: Analog: 10 (VHF, 1966–2009); Digital: 43 (UHF, 2002–2009); WIRT-DT: Analog: 13 (VHF, 1967–2009); Digital: 36 (UHF, 2002–2009)
- Call sign meaning: WDIO-DT: Duluth Channel "IO" (10); WIRT-DT: Iron Range Television

Technical information
- Licensing authority: FCC
- Facility ID: WDIO-DT: 71338; WIRT-DT: 71336
- ERP: WDIO-DT: 45 kW; WIRT-DT: 13 kW
- HAAT: WDIO-DT: 297 m (974 ft); WIRT-DT: 204 m (669 ft)
- Transmitter coordinates: WDIO-DT: 46°47′15″N 92°7′22″W; WIRT-DT: 47°22′53″N 92°57′16″W
- Translator: see § WIRT-DT translators

Links
- Public license information: WDIO-DT: Public file; LMS; WIRT-DT: Public file; LMS
- Website: www.wdio.com

WDIO-DT (channel 10) in Duluth, Minnesota, and WIRT-DT (channel 13) in Hibbing, Minnesota, are television stations serving as the ABC affiliates for northeast Minnesota and northwest Wisconsin. The stations are owned by Hubbard Broadcasting. WDIO-DT's studios and transmitter facilities are located on Observation Road in Duluth.

WIRT-DT operates as a full-time satellite of WDIO; WIRT's transmitter is located at Maple Hill Park south of Hibbing. WIRT covers areas of Minnesota's Iron Range (including Grand Rapids, Virginia and Chisholm) that receive a marginal to non-existent over-the-air signal from WDIO, although there is significant overlap between the two stations' contours otherwise. WIRT is a straight simulcast of WDIO; on-air references to WIRT are limited to Federal Communications Commission (FCC)–mandated hourly station identifications during newscasts and other programming. Aside from the transmitter, WIRT does not maintain any physical presence locally in Hibbing.

== History ==
WDIO-TV first went on the air on January 24, 1966, and has transmitted from its first day in color. It immediately joined ABC, which had previously been relegated to off-hours clearances on CBS affiliate KDAL-TV (channel 3, now KDLH) and NBC affiliate WDSM-TV (channel 6, now KBJR-TV). It was owned by Frank Befera, a trained engineer who owned a chain of radio stations across northeastern Minnesota. WIRT went on the air on August 31, 1967. Befera sold channels 10 and 13 to publishers Harcourt Brace Jovanovich in 1977, but remained as president and general manager. HBJ sold the stations to Hubbard Broadcasting in 1986, and Befera retired a year later.

The station utilized a longtime logo from the 1980s until 2019, when it switched to a callsign-only logo. The lettering used in the logo (which blends a number "10" into the "IO" lettering) dates back to as late as the early 1970s. Changes to the 10/13 logo until 2019 merely depended on changes to ABC's logo and branding guidelines.

On April 11, 2008, a blizzard swept through the Northland. This resulted in power outages in Duluth, causing WDIO, KDLH and KBJR all to lose their signal at times.

On November 28, 2011, MeTV replaced RTV on 10.2 and 13.2. At the end of September 2017, WDIO/WIRT added Ion Television programming to their third subchannels, and all three signals now run in 720p high definition.

Every New Year's Eve, WDIO often cuts in to Dick Clark's New Year's Rockin' Eve to broadcast the SMDC New Year's Eve Ball, which was a fundraiser for the hospital. In 2008, after 17 years of televising the event, WDIO announced that it would stop its annual broadcast. This decision, along with declining attendance, led to the decision to cancel the event. The Ball itself ran for 23 years and at its peak hosted 4,000 guests.

== News operation ==
WDIO/WIRT's newscasts were branded throughout the 1970s and 1980s as Action News. The station changed its branding to Eyewitness News in the early 1990s; it shared this branding with sister station KSTP-TV in Minneapolis–Saint Paul. However, the Eyewitness News branding was the station's only resemblance to KSTP. WDIO uses its own graphics and music packages.

WDIO and KSTP team up when breaking news happens (example: the I-35W bridge collapse in Minneapolis) or for major election debates.

Longtime WDIO news anchor Dennis Anderson joined the station in 1969, initially as anchor of the nightly news' "Action Line" segment. He was promoted to chief anchor of the evening newscasts in 1970; he later was the first local TV anchor to announce the sinking of the ore freighter Edmund Fitzgerald which sank in Lake Superior on November 10, 1975. Anderson retired Wednesday, May 25, 2011, after 42 years with the station. Darren Danielson, previously of WDSE, replaced Anderson as anchor the following day, Thursday, May 26.

In October 2009, 20-year veteran Deborah Anderson stepped down from being the lead anchor of the weekend newscasts. The station management filled the vacancy with reporters already employed with the station rather than searching elsewhere for a replacement.

At some point in late 2010 or early 2011, WDIO became the third station in the Duluth area to broadcast its local newscasts in 16:9 enhanced definition widescreen.

The Eyewitness News branding was retired in January 2019 in favor of WDIO News along with a new logo and broadcast set.

=== Ratings ===
Soon after sign-on, WDIO shot to the top of the local news ratings. It has remained there more or less ever since, and is one of the strongest ABC affiliates in the country. During the 1970s and 1980s, WDIO dominated competitors KDLH and KBJR.

In the May 2007 ratings race, WDIO took first place in all timeslots except at 5 p.m., where they fell to NBC affiliate KBJR. In February 2008, WDIO won with number of viewers in the morning, and at 6 and 10 p.m. KBJR once again came out slightly ahead at 5 p.m. In July 2009, WDIO topped the ratings again. The 10 p.m. newscast had about 7,000 more viewers than second place KBJR. WDIO also won in the weekend ratings.

In November 2009, WDIO doubled the ratings of KBJR at the 10 p.m. newscast with a 12 share compared to KBJR's 6 rating and KDLH's 3. The station also swept the 5 and 6 p.m. time-slots and with a 14 and an 11 rating respectively. KBJR rated a 10 at the same timeslots. according to the Duluth News Tribune

== Technical information ==
=== Subchannels ===
The stations' signals are multiplexed:

Subchannels of WDIO-DT and WIRT-DT
Channel		Res.	Short name	Programming
WDIO-DT	WIRT-DT	Res.	Short name	Programming
10.1	13.1	720p	WDIOabc	ABC
10.2	13.2	720p	WDIO-Me	MeTV
10.3	13.3	480i	ION	Ion
10.4	13.4	480i	IonPlus	Ion Plus
10.5	13.5	480i	GRIT	Grit
10.6	13.6	480i	Mystery	Ion Mystery

=== Analog-to-digital conversion ===
Both stations ended regular programming on their analog signals, on February 17, 2009, to conclude the federally mandated transition from analog to digital television. The station's digital channel allocations post-transition are as follows:

- WDIO ended regular programming on its analog signal, over VHF channel 10; the station's digital signal relocated from its pre-transition UHF channel 43 to VHF channel 10.
- WIRT ended regular programming on its analog signal, over VHF channel 13; the station's digital signal relocated from its pre-transition UHF channel 36 to VHF channel 13.

=== WIRT-DT translators ===
Besides WIRT, WDIO is seen on several outlying digital translators in the Iron Range of northeastern and north-central Minnesota. All of these translators are licensed as repeaters of WIRT; via virtual channel numbering, each translator station remaps to channel 13.

- K31MA-D Big Falls
- K23KZ-D Bigfork/Marcell
- K33PL-D Birchdale
- K24MT-D International Falls
- K32JZ-D Kabetogama
- K36KZ-D Max
- K16JD-D Northome
- K24MM-D Red Lake
