= Gates Corner, Koochiching County, Minnesota =

Gates Corner
- Unincorporated community
- Location within Minnesota Location within the United States
- Coordinates: 48°13′09″N 94°06′10″W
- Country: United States
- State: Minnesota
- County: Koochiching
- Elevation: 1,194 ft (364 m)
- Time zone: UTC-6 (Central (CST))
  - Summer (DST): UTC-5 (CDT)
- Area code: 218
- GNIS feature ID: 654719

Gates Corner is an unincorporated community in Koochiching County, Minnesota, United States.
