= Waskish Township, Beltrami County, Minnesota =

Waskish Township, Minnesota
- Township
- Location of Waskish Township, within Beltrami County, Minnesota
- Coordinates: 48°9′54″N 94°30′39″W
- Country: United States
- State: Minnesota
- County: Beltrami

Area
  - Total: 72.0 sq mi (186.5 km^{2})
  - Land: 65.0 sq mi (168.4 km^{2})
  - Water: 7.0 sq mi (18.1 km^{2})
- Elevation: 1,184 ft (361 m)

Population (2020)
  - Total: 95
  - Density: 1.5/sq mi (0.56/km^{2})
- Time zone: UTC-6 (Central (CST))
  - Summer (DST): UTC-5 (CDT)
- ZIP code: 56685
- Area code: 218
- FIPS code: 27-68440
- GNIS feature ID: 0665926

Waskish Township (/ˈwɑːskɪʃ/ WAHSS-kish) is a township in Beltrami County, Minnesota, United States. The population was 95 as of the 2020 census, primarily in the community of Waskish (pronounced was'kish). The community is notable as the only settlement on either Upper or Lower Red Lake not within the boundaries of Red Lake Indian Reservation.

It is the location of Big Bog State Recreation Area.

Waskish is derived from the Ojibwe-language word meaning "deer".

== Geography ==
According to the United States Census Bureau, the township has a total area of 72.0 square miles (186.5 km^{2}), of which 65.0 square miles (168.4 km^{2}) is land and 7.0 square miles (18.1 km^{2}) (9.69%) is water. Nearby is the Big Bog State Recreation Area and Upper Red Lake.

=== Unincorporated towns ===
- Domaas at 48.115517°N 94.550236°W
- Waskish at 48.161351°N 94.512455°W

(This list is based on USGS data and may include former settlements.)

=== Major highways ===
- Minnesota State Highway 72

=== Lakes ===
- Larson Lake
- Norman Lake
- Upper Red Lake (east edge)

=== Adjacent townships ===
- Shotley Township (southwest)

== Demographics ==
Historical population
Census	Pop.	Note	%±
1900	8		—
1910	28		250.0%
1920	154		450.0%
1940	143		—
1950	113		−21.0%
1970	138		—
1980	133		−3.6%
1990	111		−16.5%
2000	116		4.5%
2010	118		1.7%
2020	95		−19.5%
U.S. Decennial Census

As of the census of 2000, there were 116 people, 61 households, and 35 families residing in the township. The population density was 1.8 people per square mile (0.7/km^{2}). There were 313 housing units at an average density of 4.8/sq mi (1.9/km^{2}). The racial makeup of the township was 95.69% White, 2.59% African American, 0.86% Native American, and 0.86% from two or more races.

There were 61 households, out of which 9.8% had children under the age of 18 living with them, 52.5% were married couples living together, 3.3% had a female householder with no husband present, and 42.6% were non-families. 41.0% of all households were made up of individuals, and 16.4% had someone living alone who was 65 years of age or older. The average household size was 1.90 and the average family size was 2.49.

In the township the population was spread out, with 10.3% under the age of 18, 5.2% from 18 to 24, 12.9% from 25 to 44, 44.0% from 45 to 64, and 27.6% who were 65 years of age or older. The median age was 58 years. For every 100 females, there were 123.1 males. For every 100 females age 18 and over, there were 112.2 males.

The median income for a household in the township was $25,000, and the median income for a family was $29,750. Males had a median income of $17,813 versus $52,500 for females. The per capita income for the township was $19,489. There were 12.8% of families and 26.8% of the population living below the poverty line, including 77.8% of under eighteens and 5.7% of those over 64.
