= East Koochiching, Minnesota =

Unorganized territory of Koochiching County, Minnesota, United States

- Unorganized territory
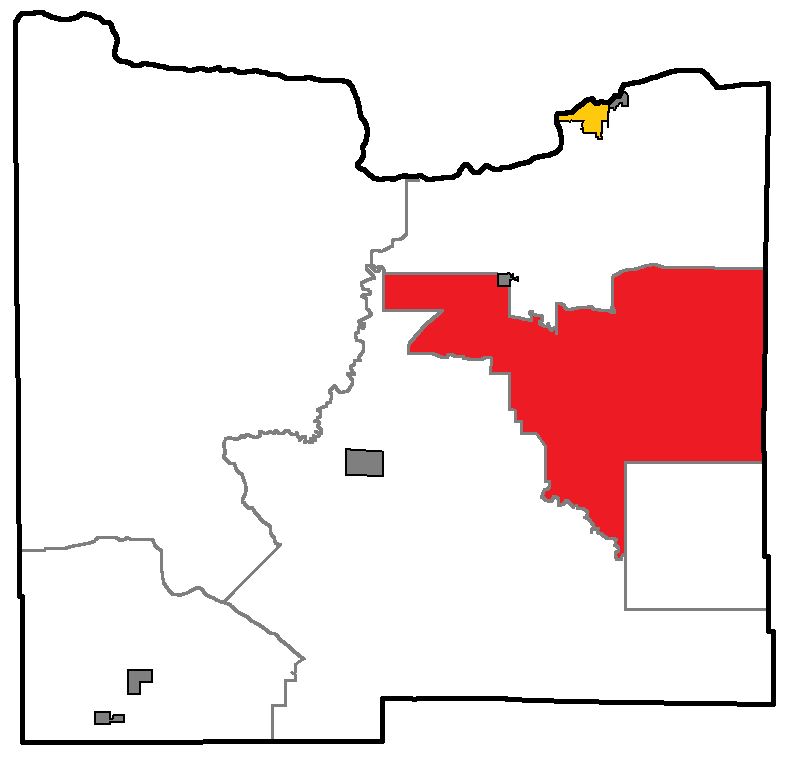
- Location of East Koochiching, within Koochiching County, Minnesota
- Coordinates: 48°17′57″N 93°21′32″W
- Country: United States
- State: Minnesota
- County: Koochiching

Area
  - Total: 386.11 sq mi (1,000.0 km^{2})
  - Land: 385.42 sq mi (998.2 km^{2})
  - Water: 0.69 sq mi (1.8 km^{2})

Population (2020)
  - Total: 330
  - Density: 0.86/sq mi (0.33/km^{2})
- Time zone: UTC-6 (Central (CST))
  - Summer (DST): UTC-5 (CDT)
- Area code: 218
- GNIS feature ID: 664030

East Koochiching is an unorganized territory in Koochiching County, Minnesota, United States. The population was 330 at the 2020 census.

== Geography ==
According to the United States Census Bureau, the unorganized territory has a total area of 386.1 square miles (1,000.0 km^{2}), of which 385.2 square miles (997.7 km^{2}) is land and 0.9 square mile (2.3 km^{2}) (0.23%) is water.

== Demographics ==
As of the census of 2000, there were 383 people, 151 households, and 109 families residing in the unorganized territory. The population density was 1.0 inhabitant per square mile (0.39/km^{2}). There were 273 housing units at an average density of 0.7 per square mile (0.27/km^{2}). The racial makeup of the unorganized territory was 95.82% White, 0.26% Black or African American, 0.52% Native American, 0.52% from other races, and 2.87% from two or more races. Hispanic or Latino of any race were 1.04% of the population.

There were 151 households, out of which 27.8% had children under the age of 18 living with them, 68.2% were married couples living together, 1.3% had a female householder with no husband present, and 27.8% were non-families. 23.2% of all households were made up of individuals, and 11.3% had someone living alone who was 65 years of age or older. The average household size was 2.54 and the average family size was 3.03.

In the unorganized territory the population was spread out, with 24.5% under the age of 18, 6.0% from 18 to 24, 26.1% from 25 to 44, 29.2% from 45 to 64, and 14.1% who were 65 years of age or older. The median age was 41 years. For every 100 females, there were 118.9 males. For every 100 females age 18 and over, there were 114.1 males.

The median income for a household in the unorganized territory was $32,083, and the median income for a family was $32,857. Males had a median income of $35,156 versus $40,179 for females. The per capita income for the unorganized territory was $16,555. About 14.6% of families and 18.2% of the population were below the poverty line, including 31.9% of those under age 18 and 12.9% of those age 65 or over.
