= Koochiching County, Minnesota =

County in Minnesota, United States

- County
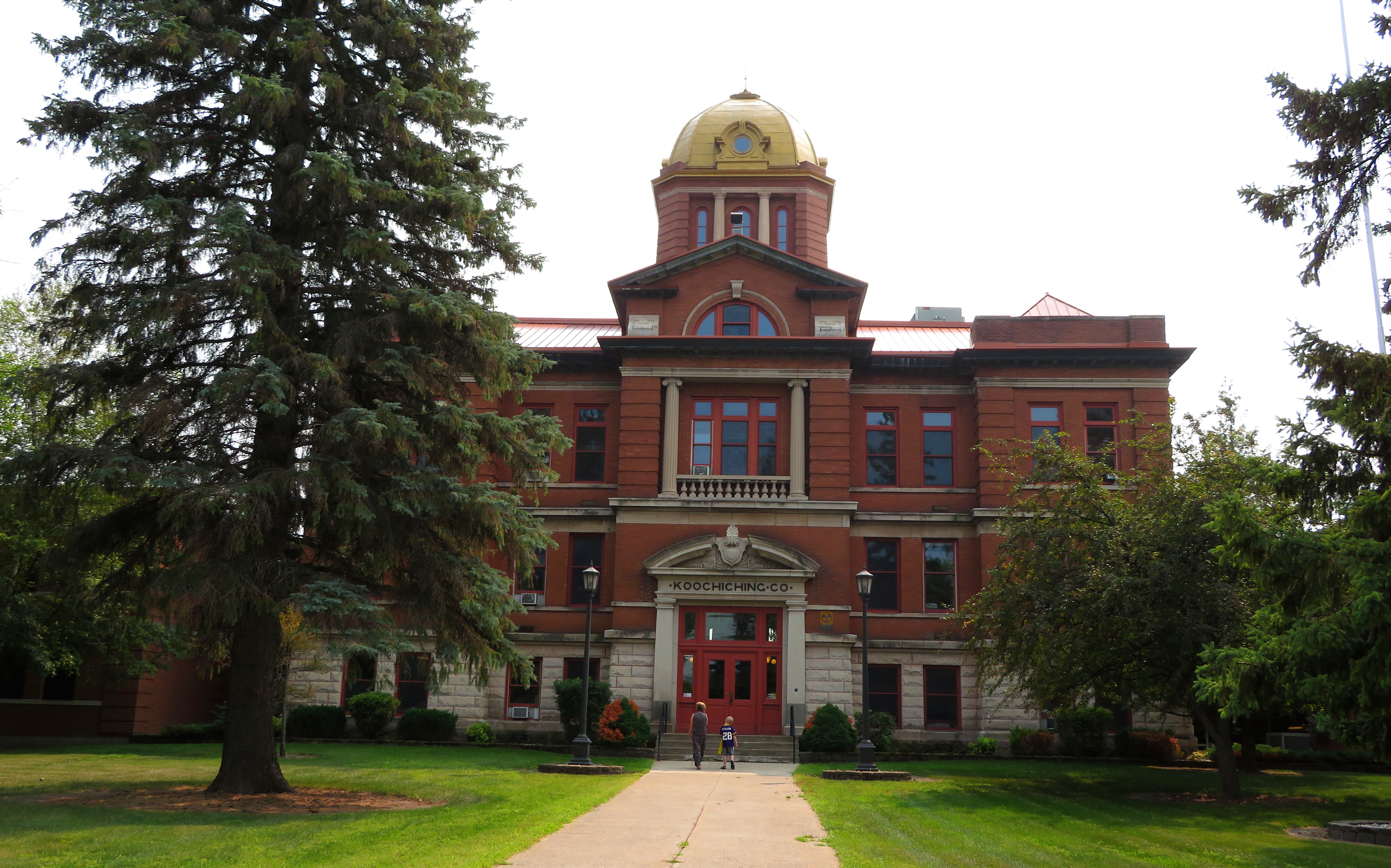
- Koochiching County Courthouse

- Location within the U.S. state of Minnesota
- Coordinates: 48.26°N 93.77°W
- Country: United States
- State: Minnesota
- Founded: December 19, 1906
- Named for: Algonquian word for 'at the place of inlets'
- Seat: International Falls
- Largest city: International Falls

Area
  - Total: 3,154 sq mi (8,170 km^{2})
  - Land: 3,104 sq mi (8,040 km^{2})
  - Water: 50 sq mi (130 km^{2}) 1.6%

Population (2020)
  - Total: 12,062
  - Estimate (2025): 11,587 ▼
  - Density: 3.9/sq mi (1.5/km^{2})
- Time zone: UTC−6 (Central)
  - Summer (DST): UTC−5 (CDT)
- Congressional district: 8th
- Website: www.co.koochiching.mn.us

Koochiching County (/ˈkuːtʃɪtʃɪŋ/ KOO-chitch-ing) is a county in the U.S. state of Minnesota. As of the 2020 census, the population was 12,062. Its county seat is International Falls. A portion of the Bois Forte Indian Reservation is in the county. A small part of Voyageurs National Park extends into its boundary, with Lake of the Woods County to its northwest.

== History ==
About 10,000 years ago almost 90% of Koochiching County was covered by Lake Agassiz. When it receded it left low areas of decayed vegetation (muskeg); as a result, three-quarters of northern Koochiching are underlain with 2 to 50 feet of peat.

The name "Koochiching" comes from either the Ojibwe word Gojijiing or Cree Kocicīhk (recorded in some documents as "Ouchichiq"), both meaning 'at the place of inlets', referring to the neighboring Rainy Lake and River. Reverend J.A. Gilfillan recorded their meaning, "according to some, Neighbor lake, according to others a lake somewhere", possibly referring to the neighboring Rainy Lake and to Lake Couchiching located in southern Ontario. Early French inhabitants gave the names Lac à la Pluie ('Rainy Lake') and Rivière à la Pluie ('Rainy River') to the nearby bodies of water because of the mist-like rain present at the falls of Rainy River and then to the settlement that became known as International Falls.

This area was among the last in Minnesota to be settled. European settlers in Koochiching County started coming in the late 1800s. Some of the last lands were ceded from the Chippewa in a 1904 Land Act. Homesteads were being proven primarily in the 1900-1910 decade. Settlers were lumberjacks and farmers and many other trades, they "suffered through isolation, illness, harsh weather, and poverty... They built schools, churches, and fought for good roads".

The county is one of the youngest in the state, having been created in 1906 after separating from Itasca County.

== Geography ==
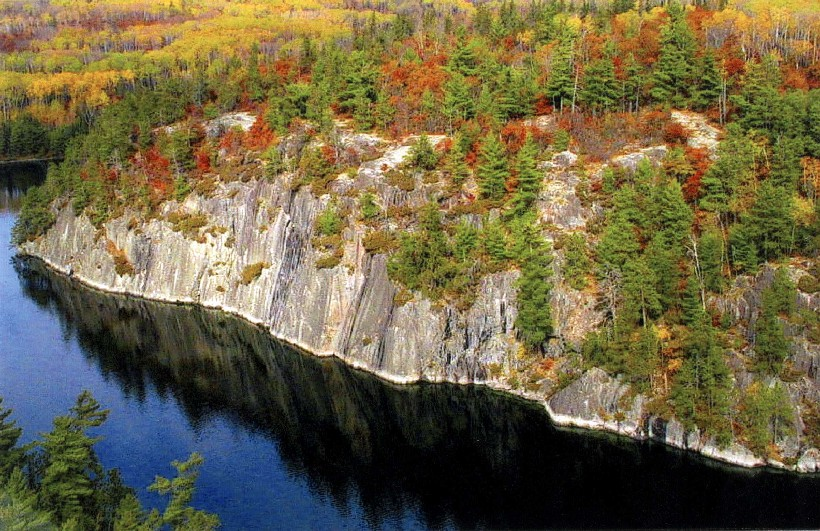
Voyageurs National Park

Koochiching County lies on the northern edge of Minnesota. Its northern border abuts the south border of Canada (across the Rainy River). The Rainy River flows west-northwestward along its north border, being fed by several rivers which drain from the county into the Rainy: Rat Root River drains the east central part of the county; Little Fork River flows northward through the eastern part of the county; Big Fork River flows northward through the east-central part of the county; Black River flows northward through the central part of the county; Rapid River and East Fork Rapid River flow north-northwestward through the western part of the county, joining in the northwestern part of the county shortly before exiting the county's west line to discharge into the Rainy, just west of the county's northwestern corner.

The county terrain consists of low rolling hills, with swampy areas where Lake Agassiz basin was deepest. There are also deposits of peat from 1½ to 50 feet in the low areas. The fairly level soil is broken by ledges of Precambrian rock. Bedrock in the area includes Ely greenstone and greenstone schists that are said to be among the oldest on the planet. The terrain slopes to the north, with its highest point on the western part of its southern border at 1,515 ft (462 m) ASL. The county has a total area of 3,154 square miles (8,170 km^{2}), of which 3,104 square miles (8,040 km^{2}) is land and 50 square miles (130 km^{2}) (1.6%) is water. It is the second-largest county in Minnesota by land area (second to neighboring St. Louis County) and third-largest by total area.

=== Major highways ===
- U.S. Highway 53
- U.S. Highway 71
- Minnesota State Highway 1
- Minnesota State Highway 6
- Minnesota State Highway 11
- Minnesota State Highway 46
- Minnesota State Highway 65
- Minnesota State Highway 217

=== Adjacent counties ===
- Rainy River District, Ontario - north
- Saint Louis County - east
- Itasca County - south
- Beltrami County - southwest
- Lake of the Woods County - northwest

=== Protected areas ===
- East Rat Root River Scientific and Natural Area
- Lost River Peatland Scientific and Natural Area
- Myrtle Lake Peatland Scientific and Natural Area
- Pine Island State Forest
- Smoky Bear State Forest
- South Black River Peatland Scientific and Natural Area
- Superior National Forest (part)
- Voyageurs National Park (part)

=== Lakes ===
- Bartlett Lake
- Battle Lake
- Cameron Lake
- Clear Lake
- Dark Lake
- Franklin Lake
- Larson Lake
- Little Constance Lake
- Little Lake
- Lost Lake
- Moose Lake
- Myrtle Lake
- Nett Lake (part)
- Pine Lake
- Pocquette Lake
- Rainy Lake (part)
- Rat Root Lake
- Seretha Lake
- Silversack Lake
- Teufer Lake

== Demographics ==
Historical population
Census	Pop.	Note	%±
1910	6,431		—
1920	13,520		110.2%
1930	14,078		4.1%
1940	16,930		20.3%
1950	16,910		−0.1%
1960	18,190		7.6%
1970	17,131		−5.8%
1980	17,571		2.6%
1990	16,299		−7.2%
2000	14,355		−11.9%
2010	13,311		−7.3%
2020	12,062		−9.4%
2025 (est.)	11,587	▼	−3.9%
U.S. Decennial Census; 1790–1960 1900–1990; 1990–2000 2010–2020

=== Racial and ethnic composition ===
Koochiching County, Minnesota – Racial and ethnic composition Note: the US Census treats Hispanic/Latino as an ethnic category. This table excludes Latinos from the racial categories and assigns them to a separate category. Hispanics/Latinos may be of any race.
Race / Ethnicity (NH = Non-Hispanic)	Pop 1980	Pop 1990	Pop 2000	Pop 2010	Pop 2020	% 1980	% 1990	% 2000	% 2010	% 2020
White alone (NH)	17,086	15,570	13,744	12,512	10,920	97.24%	95.53%	95.74%	94.00%	90.53%
Black or African American alone (NH)	13	43	27	76	44	0.07%	0.26%	0.19%	0.57%	0.36%
Native American or Alaska Native alone (NH)	357	447	304	303	278	2.03%	2.74%	2.12%	2.28%	2.30%
Asian alone (NH)	38	50	24	44	34	0.22%	0.31%	0.17%	0.33%	0.28%
Native Hawaiian or Pacific Islander alone (NH)	x	x	4	1	12	x	x	0.03%	0.01%	0.10%
Other race alone (NH)	32	4	3	4	30	0.18%	0.02%	0.02%	0.03%	0.25%
Mixed race or Multiracial (NH)	x	x	168	224	577	x	x	1.17%	1.68%	4.78%
Hispanic or Latino (any race)	45	185	81	147	167	0.26%	1.14%	0.56%	1.10%	1.38%
Total	17,571	16,299	14,355	13,311	12,062	100.00%	100.00%	100.00%	100.00%	100.00%

=== 2020 census ===
As of the 2020 census, the county had a population of 12,062. The median age was 49.9 years. 18.5% of residents were under the age of 18 and 25.9% of residents were 65 years of age or older. For every 100 females there were 100.5 males, and for every 100 females age 18 and over there were 100.3 males age 18 and over.

The racial makeup of the county was 91.0% White, 0.4% Black or African American, 2.4% American Indian and Alaska Native, 0.3% Asian, 0.1% Native Hawaiian and Pacific Islander, 0.4% from some other race, and 5.4% from two or more races. Hispanic or Latino residents of any race comprised 1.4% of the population.

54.5% of residents lived in urban areas, while 45.5% lived in rural areas.

There were 5,604 households in the county, of which 21.3% had children under the age of 18 living in them. Of all households, 43.8% were married-couple households, 23.1% were households with a male householder and no spouse or partner present, and 24.8% were households with a female householder and no spouse or partner present. About 35.6% of all households were made up of individuals and 17.2% had someone living alone who was 65 years of age or older.

There were 7,402 housing units, of which 24.3% were vacant. Among occupied housing units, 78.1% were owner-occupied and 21.9% were renter-occupied. The homeowner vacancy rate was 2.3% and the rental vacancy rate was 12.5%.

=== 2000 census ===
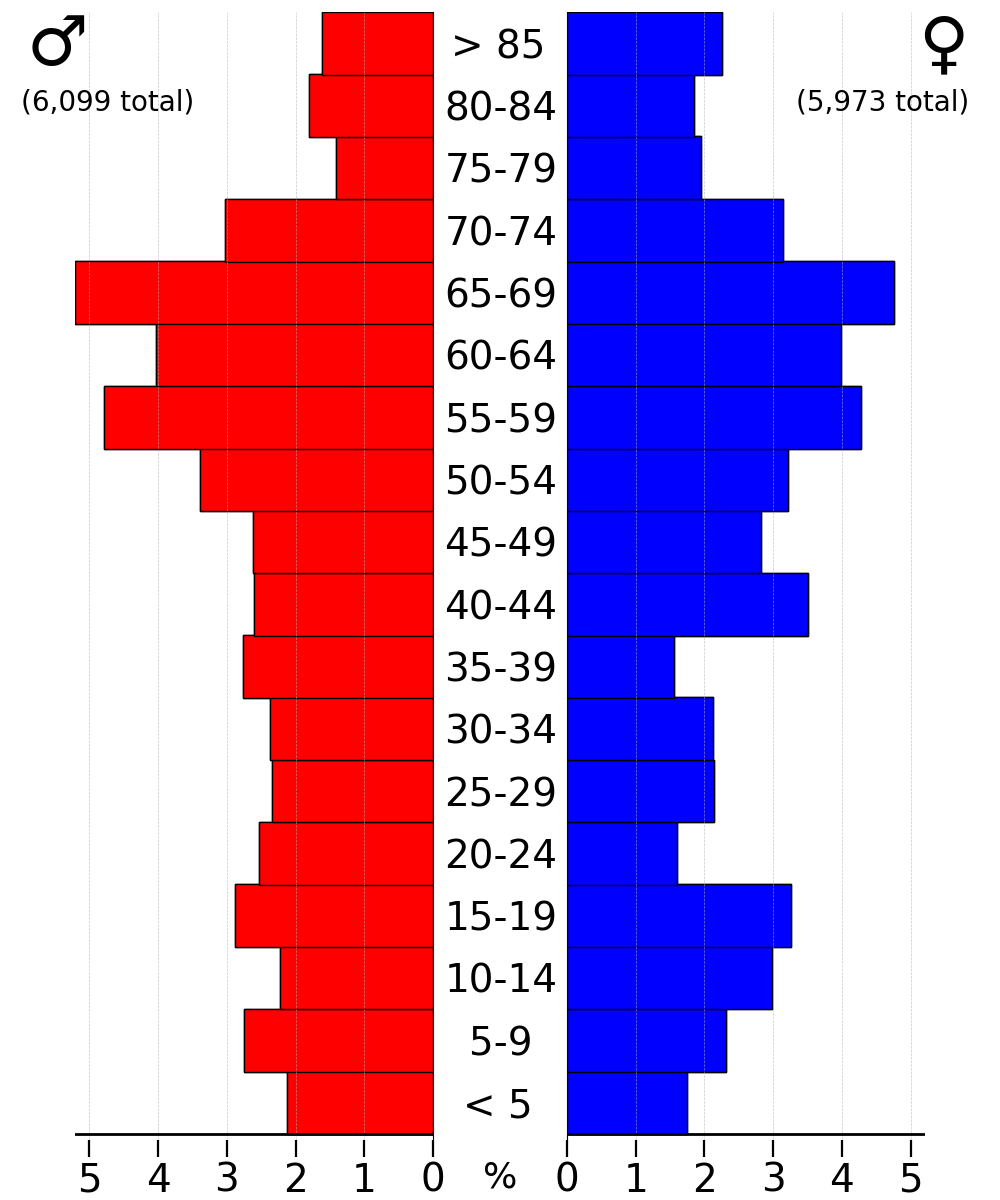
2022 US Census population pyramid for Koochiching County, from ACS 5-year estimates

As of the census of 2000, there were 14,355 people, 6,040 households, and 3,962 families in the county. The population density was 4.62 per square mile (1.78/km^{2}). There were 7,719 housing units at an average density of 2.49 per square mile (0.96/km^{2}). The racial makeup of the county was 96.12% White, 0.19% Black or African American, 2.15% Native American, 0.17% Asian, 0.06% Pacific Islander, 0.08% from other races, and 1.23% from two or more races. 0.56% of the population were Hispanic or Latino of any race. 21.2% were of Norwegian, 19.8% German, 12.3% Swedish and 7.0% Irish ancestry.

There were 6,040 households, out of which 28.40% had children under the age of 18 living with them, 53.30% were married couples living together, 8.50% had a female householder with no husband present, and 34.40% were non-families. 30.40% of all households were made up of individuals, and 14.50% had someone living alone who was 65 years of age or older. The average household size was 2.33 and the average family size was 2.88.

The county population contained 23.90% under the age of 18, 6.40% from 18 to 24, 25.80% from 25 to 44, 26.00% from 45 to 64, and 18.00% who were 65 years of age or older. The median age was 42 years. For every 100 females there were 98.50 males. For every 100 females age 18 and over, there were 95.20 males.

The median income for a household in the county was $36,262, and the median income for a family was $43,608. Males had a median income of $40,642 versus $22,261 for females. The per capita income for the county was $19,167. About 8.40% of families and 12.10% of the population were below the poverty line, including 16.10% of those under age 18 and 13.40% of those age 65 or over.

== Government and politics ==
From 1932 through 1996, Koochiching County voters tended Democratic, selecting the Democratic nominee in every election save Nixon's 1972 landslide. In 2000, George W. Bush became the first Republican to carry the county since 1972, despite narrowly losing the overall national popular vote. It returned to the Democratic column in the subsequent three elections, although none of the Democratic nominees in those three elections managed as high a vote share as Mondale in 1984 or Dukakis in 1988. In 2016, Donald Trump became the second Republican since 1972 to carry the county, and carried it again in 2020, with an increased majority—the first time the county has ever voted Republican two elections in a row. Trump won Koochiching County for a third time in 2024, taking nearly 62% of the vote, becoming the first ever Republican to win more than 60% of the county's vote.

United States presidential election results for Koochiching County, Minnesota
Year	Republican		Democratic		Third party(ies)	
Year	No.	%	No.	%	No.	%
1908	826	56.00%	420	28.47%	229	15.53%
1912	239	12.63%	638	33.72%	1,015	53.65%
1916	474	25.68%	1,089	58.99%	283	15.33%
1920	1,786	55.29%	859	26.59%	585	18.11%
1924	1,536	37.42%	222	5.41%	2,347	57.17%
1928	2,599	53.67%	2,110	43.57%	134	2.77%
1932	1,427	28.69%	3,148	63.29%	399	8.02%
1936	1,316	20.21%	5,065	77.77%	132	2.03%
1940	2,095	28.49%	5,219	70.98%	39	0.53%
1944	1,607	28.50%	3,981	70.60%	51	0.90%
1948	1,718	24.66%	4,968	71.30%	282	4.05%
1952	2,742	40.02%	4,078	59.52%	31	0.45%
1956	2,757	42.63%	3,695	57.13%	16	0.25%
1960	3,055	39.90%	4,578	59.80%	23	0.30%
1964	1,602	21.39%	5,878	78.47%	11	0.15%
1968	2,104	29.57%	4,697	66.01%	315	4.43%
1972	3,681	50.91%	3,396	46.97%	153	2.12%
1976	2,893	36.13%	4,846	60.52%	268	3.35%
1980	3,433	41.61%	4,181	50.68%	636	7.71%
1984	3,466	44.77%	4,238	54.74%	38	0.49%
1988	2,842	41.92%	3,867	57.04%	71	1.05%
1992	1,954	26.18%	3,474	46.54%	2,037	27.29%
1996	2,080	30.91%	3,472	51.59%	1,178	17.50%
2000	3,523	51.21%	2,903	42.20%	453	6.59%
2004	3,539	48.42%	3,662	50.10%	108	1.48%
2008	2,962	43.55%	3,649	53.65%	191	2.81%
2012	2,841	43.99%	3,451	53.44%	166	2.57%
2016	3,569	56.09%	2,306	36.24%	488	7.67%
2020	4,131	59.68%	2,659	38.41%	132	1.91%
2024	4,204	61.92%	2,465	36.31%	120	1.77%

County Board of Commissioners
Position	Name	District	Next Election
Commissioner and Vice Chair	Destry Hell	District 1	2026
Commissioner	Ricky Roche	District 2	2026
Commissioner	Terry Murray	District 3	2025
Commissioner and Board Chair	Jason Sjoblom	District 4	2026
Commissioner	Wayne Skoe	District 5	2025

State Legislature
Position	Name	Affiliation	District
Minnesota State Senate	Grant Hauschild	Democrat	District 3
Minnesota State House of Representatives	Roger Skraba	Republican	District 3A

U.S Congress (2025)
Position	Name	Affiliation	District
House of Representatives	Pete Stauber	Republican	8th
Senate	Amy Klobuchar	Democrat	N/A
Senate	Tina Smith	Democrat	N/A

== Communities ==
Koochiching County is one of two counties in Minnesota that have no organized civil township governments within the county (the other is neighboring Lake of the Woods County), due to legislative action taken by the county to absorb existing township governments. Survey townships, as defined by the Public Land Survey System exist but are not organized. Six city governments have been created, and the rest of the county consists of unorganized territories and unincorporated communities.

=== Cities ===
- Big Falls
- International Falls (county seat; named Koochiching until January 1, 1903)
- Littlefork
- Mizpah
- Northome
- Ranier
- South International Falls (part of International Falls since 1987)

=== Unorganized territories ===
- East Koochiching
- Nett Lake
- Northome
- Northwest Koochiching
- Rainy Lake
- South Koochiching

=== Census-designated place ===
- Nett Lake (part)

=== Other unincorporated communities ===
- Birchdale
- Bramble
- Central
- Craigville
- Ericsburg
- Forest Grove
- Frontier
- Gates Corner
- Gemmell
- Grand Falls
- Indus
- Island View
- Jameson
- Laurel
- Lindford
- Loman
- Manitou
- Margie
- Nakoda
- Pelland
- Pinetop
- Rauch
- Ray
- Silverdale
- Wildwood

=== Ghost towns ===
- Border
- Fairland
- Falls Junction
- Rainy Lake City
- Ridge
- The Pines
- Wayland

== In popular culture ==
Koochiching County is the location of the fictional town of Frostbite Falls, the home of the animated characters Rocky and Bullwinkle. Frostbite Falls was probably named in honor of International Falls, since International Falls is often referred to as the nation's icebox.

== See also ==
- Laurel complex
- National Register of Historic Places listings in Koochiching County, Minnesota
- Lake Agassiz Peatlands Natural Area
- Iron Range
- Ernest Oberholtzer
