= Northome (unorganized territory), Minnesota =

Unorganized territory of Koochiching County, Minnesota, United States

Northome, Minnesota
- Unorganized territory
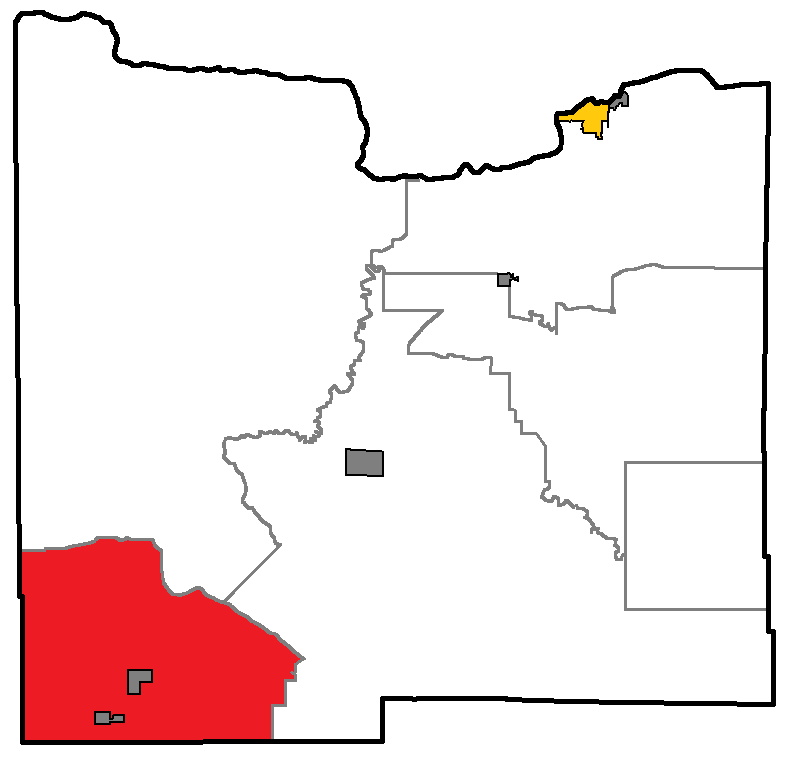
- Location of Northome, within Koochiching County, Minnesota
- Coordinates: 47°57′17″N 94°12′35″W
- Country: United States
- State: Minnesota
- County: Koochiching

Area
  - Total: 297.54 sq mi (770.6 km^{2})
  - Land: 296.24 sq mi (767.3 km^{2})
  - Water: 1.31 sq mi (3.4 km^{2})

Population (2020)
  - Total: 448
  - Density: 1.51/sq mi (0.584/km^{2})
- Time zone: UTC-6 (Central (CST))
  - Summer (DST): UTC-5 (CDT)
- Area code: 218
- GNIS feature ID: 665164

Northome is an unorganized territory in Koochiching County, Minnesota, United States. The term "unorganized territory" is used by the United States Census Bureau to designate a portion of a county that is not included in any legally established minor civil division for the purpose of presenting statistical data. The population was 448 at the 2020 census.

The name is derived from the city of Northome, which along with the city of Mizpah are the only municipalities within the geographical extent of the territory. The area encompassed by the statistical entity covers the southwestern corner of Koochiching County, with the exception of the two cities.

The territory had included several former townships, such as Bridgie, Engelwood, Forest Grove, and Wildwood, all of which were dissolved in 1950. In Koochiching County, township rights and responsibilities were assumed by the county.

== Geography ==
According to the United States Census Bureau, the unorganized territory has a total area of 297.3 square miles (770.0 km^{2}), of which 296.0 square miles (766.6 km^{2}) is land and 1.3 square miles (3.4 km^{2}) (0.44%) is water.

== Demographics ==
As of the census of 2000, there were 496 people, 192 households, and 143 families residing in the unorganized territory. The population density was 1.7 inhabitants per square mile (0.66/km^{2}). There were 336 housing units at an average density of 1.1 per square mile (0.42/km^{2}). The racial makeup of the unorganized territory was 95.97% White, 3.43% Native American and 0.60% Pacific Islander. Hispanic or Latino of any race were 1.01% of the population.

There were 192 households, out of which 31.3% had children under the age of 18 living with them, 65.1% were married couples living together, 6.8% had a female householder with no husband present, and 25.5% were non-families. 23.4% of all households were made up of individuals, and 13.5% had someone living alone who was 65 years of age or older. The average household size was 2.58 and the average family size was 3.02.

In the unorganized territory the population was spread out, with 27.4% under the age of 18, 5.4% from 18 to 24, 22.0% from 25 to 44, 29.0% from 45 to 64, and 16.1% who were 65 years of age or older. The median age was 42 years. For every 100 females, there were 111.1 males. For every 100 females age 18 and over, there were 106.9 males.

The median income for a household in the unorganized territory was $26,696, and the median income for a family was $34,583. Males had a median income of $24,375 versus $20,833 for females. The per capita income for the unorganized territory was $13,182. About 14.3% of families and 19.6% of the population were below the poverty line, including 31.7% of those under age 18 and 16.5% of those age 65 or over.
