= Big Falls, Minnesota =

City in Minnesota, United States

Big Falls
- City
- Location of the city of Big Falls within Koochiching County, Minnesota
- Coordinates: 48°11′22″N 93°48′28″W
- Country: United States
- State: Minnesota
- County: Koochiching

Area
  - Total: 6.04 sq mi (15.65 km^{2})
  - Land: 6.04 sq mi (15.65 km^{2})
  - Water: 0 sq mi (0.00 km^{2})
- Elevation: 1,217 ft (371 m)

Population (2020)
  - Total: 175
  - Density: 29.0/sq mi (11.18/km^{2})
- Time zone: UTC-6 (Central (CST))
  - Summer (DST): UTC-5 (CDT)
- ZIP code: 56627
- Area code: 218
- FIPS code: 27-05680
- GNIS feature ID: 0640086
- Website: bigfalls.govoffice.com

Big Falls is a city in Koochiching County, Minnesota, United States. The population was 175 at the 2020 census.

U.S. Highway 71 and Minnesota State Highway 6 are two of the main routes in Big Falls.

== History ==
The city was named for a nearby waterfall on the Big Fork River. A post office named Big Falls has been in operation since 1906.

== Geography ==
According to the United States Census Bureau, the city has a total area of 6.06 square miles (15.70 km^{2}), all land.

=== Climate ===
Climate data for Big Falls, Minnesota, 1991–2020 normals, extremes 1930–present
Month	Jan	Feb	Mar	Apr	May	Jun	Jul	Aug	Sep	Oct	Nov	Dec	Year
Record high °F (°C)	54 (12)	62 (17)	83 (28)	92 (33)	97 (36)	105 (41)	106 (41)	99 (37)	98 (37)	89 (32)	75 (24)	59 (15)	106 (41)
Mean maximum °F (°C)	38.2 (3.4)	45.8 (7.7)	57.7 (14.3)	72.7 (22.6)	83.0 (28.3)	87.0 (30.6)	88.9 (31.6)	87.8 (31.0)	84.0 (28.9)	74.3 (23.5)	54.0 (12.2)	39.7 (4.3)	90.9 (32.7)
Mean daily maximum °F (°C)	14.8 (−9.6)	22.2 (−5.4)	35.8 (2.1)	50.4 (10.2)	63.8 (17.7)	72.0 (22.2)	76.5 (24.7)	74.6 (23.7)	65.4 (18.6)	50.4 (10.2)	33.4 (0.8)	19.3 (−7.1)	48.2 (9.0)
Daily mean °F (°C)	4.9 (−15.1)	10.5 (−11.9)	24.2 (−4.3)	38.5 (3.6)	51.5 (10.8)	60.7 (15.9)	65.0 (18.3)	63.2 (17.3)	54.5 (12.5)	41.3 (5.2)	25.3 (−3.7)	10.9 (−11.7)	37.5 (3.1)
Mean daily minimum °F (°C)	−4.9 (−20.5)	−1.3 (−18.5)	12.6 (−10.8)	26.7 (−2.9)	39.2 (4.0)	49.5 (9.7)	53.5 (11.9)	51.9 (11.1)	43.6 (6.4)	32.3 (0.2)	17.3 (−8.2)	2.4 (−16.4)	26.9 (−2.8)
Mean minimum °F (°C)	−32.4 (−35.8)	−27.4 (−33.0)	−15.0 (−26.1)	11.3 (−11.5)	25.7 (−3.5)	35.5 (1.9)	43.5 (6.4)	40.1 (4.5)	29.1 (−1.6)	18.4 (−7.6)	−1.5 (−18.6)	−23.9 (−31.1)	−34.6 (−37.0)
Record low °F (°C)	−52 (−47)	−53 (−47)	−42 (−41)	−19 (−28)	12 (−11)	21 (−6)	32 (0)	25 (−4)	10 (−12)	−12 (−24)	−33 (−36)	−51 (−46)	−53 (−47)
Average precipitation inches (mm)	0.86 (22)	0.68 (17)	1.16 (29)	1.70 (43)	3.09 (78)	4.40 (112)	4.09 (104)	3.36 (85)	3.16 (80)	2.44 (62)	1.33 (34)	1.02 (26)	27.29 (692)
Average snowfall inches (cm)	11.6 (29)	7.6 (19)	7.8 (20)	4.5 (11)	0.1 (0.25)	0.0 (0.0)	0.0 (0.0)	0.0 (0.0)	0.0 (0.0)	1.9 (4.8)	9.7 (25)	11.6 (29)	54.8 (138.05)
Average extreme snow depth inches (cm)	12.9 (33)	14.1 (36)	10.7 (27)	1.7 (4.3)	0.0 (0.0)	0.0 (0.0)	0.0 (0.0)	0.0 (0.0)	0.0 (0.0)	0.3 (0.76)	2.8 (7.1)	7.1 (18)	18.8 (48)
Average precipitation days (≥ 0.01 in)	8.5	6.3	6.7	8.6	12.4	13.7	11.6	8.2	10.7	10.9	6.0	8.8	112.4
Average snowy days (≥ 0.1 in)	9.7	6.8	4.8	2.0	0.2	0.0	0.0	0.0	0.0	1.5	4.6	12.1	41.7
Source 1: NOAA
Source 2: National Weather Service (snow/snow days/snow depth 1981–2010)

== Demographics ==
Historical population
Census	Pop.	Note	%±
1910	325		—
1920	365		12.3%
1930	440		20.5%
1940	509		15.7%
1950	441		−13.4%
1960	526		19.3%
1970	534		1.5%
1980	490		−8.2%
1990	341		−30.4%
2000	264		−22.6%
2010	236		−10.6%
2020	175		−25.8%
U.S. Decennial Census; 2020 Census

=== 2010 census ===
As of the census of 2010, there were 236 people, 130 households, and 63 families living in the city. The population density was 38.9 inhabitants per square mile (15.0/km^{2}). There were 181 housing units at an average density of 29.9 per square mile (11.5/km^{2}). The racial makeup of the city was 97.0% White, 1.7% Native American, and 1.3% from two or more races. Hispanic or Latino of any race were 1.7% of the population.

There were 130 households, of which 13.8% had children under the age of 18 living with them, 42.3% were married couples living together, 3.8% had a female householder with no husband present, 2.3% had a male householder with no wife present, and 51.5% were non-families. 42.3% of all households were made up of individuals, and 16.1% had someone living alone who was 65 years of age or older. The average household size was 1.82 and the average family size was 2.43.

The median age in the city was 53.8 years. 11.4% of residents were under the age of 18; 2.7% were between the ages of 18 and 24; 18.2% were from 25 to 44; 44% were from 45 to 64; and 23.7% were 65 years of age or older. The gender makeup of the city was 53.0% male and 47.0% female.

=== 2000 census ===
As of the census of 2000, there were 264 people, 134 households, and 73 families living in the city. The population density was 43.7 inhabitants per square mile (16.9/km^{2}). There were 191 housing units at an average density of 31.6 per square mile (12.2/km^{2}). The racial makeup of the city was 98.11% White, 0.38% Native American, 0.38% Asian, and 1.14% from two or more races.

There were 134 households, out of which 21.6% had children under the age of 18 living with them, 42.5% were married couples living together, 8.2% had a female householder with no husband present, and 44.8% were non-families. 41.8% of all households were made up of individuals, and 17.9% had someone living alone who was 65 years of age or older. The average household size was 1.97 and the average family size was 2.61.

In the city, the population was spread out, with 19.7% under the age of 18, 3.8% from 18 to 24, 24.6% from 25 to 44, 30.3% from 45 to 64, and 21.6% who were 65 years of age or older. The median age was 46 years. For every 100 females, there were 109.5 males. For every 100 females age 18 and over, there were 107.8 males.

The median income for a household in the city was $26,458, and the median income for a family was $28,125. Males had a median income of $24,375 versus $17,083 for females. The per capita income for the city was $14,528. About 12.0% of families and 14.7% of the population were below the poverty line, including 20.0% of those under the age of eighteen and 7.3% of those 65 or over.

== Media ==
=== Television ===
Channel	Callsign	Affiliation	Branding	Subchannels		Owner
(Virtual)	Callsign	Affiliation	Branding	Channel	Programming	Owner
9.1	K29KE-D (KAWE Translator)	PBS	Lakeland PBS	9.2; 9.3; 9.4; 9.5; 9.6	First Nations Experience; PBS Kids; Create; PBS Encore; Minnesota Channel	County of Koochiching
11.1	K27LL-D (KRII Translator)	NBC	KBJR 6	11.2; 11.3	CBS; H&I/MyNetworkTV	County of Koochiching
13.1	K31MA-D (WIRT Translator)	ABC	WCCO 4	13.2; 13.3	MeTV; Ion Television	County of Koochiching
