= Birchdale, Minnesota =

Unincorporated community in Minnesota, United States

Birchdale
- Unincorporated community
- Location within Minnesota Location within the United States
- Coordinates: 48°37′37″N 94°06′07″W
- Country: United States
- State: Minnesota
- County: Koochiching
- Elevation: 1,165 ft (355 m)
- Time zone: UTC-6 (Central (CST))
  - Summer (DST): UTC-5 (CDT)
- ZIP code: 56623 or 56629
- Area code: 218
- GNIS feature ID: 640183

Birchdale is an unincorporated community in Koochiching County, Minnesota, United States.

The community is located between International Falls and Baudette on State Highway 11 (MN 11), 42 miles west of International Falls and 26 miles east of Baudette, within Northwest Koochiching Unorganized Territory

Franz Jevne State Park and the Rainy River are both in the vicinity.

Popular events include the annual 4 July and Holiday Lights parades.

== Media ==
=== Television ===
Channel	Callsign	Affiliation	Branding	Subchannels		Owner
(Virtual)	Callsign	Affiliation	Branding	Channel	Programming	Owner
9.1	K35MY-D (KAWE Translator)	PBS	Lakeland PBS	9.2; 9.3; 9.4; 9.5; 9.6	First Nations Experience; PBS Kids; Create; PBS Encore; Minnesota Channel	County of Koochiching
11.1	K31PK-D (KRII Translator)	NBC	KBJR 6	11.2; 11.3	CBS; H&I/MyNetworkTV	County of Koochiching
13.1	K33PL-D (WIRT Translator)	ABC	WCCO 4	13.2; 13.3	MeTV; Ion Television	County of Koochiching
