= South Koochiching, Minnesota =

Unorganized territory of Koochiching County, Minnesota, United States

- Unorganized territory
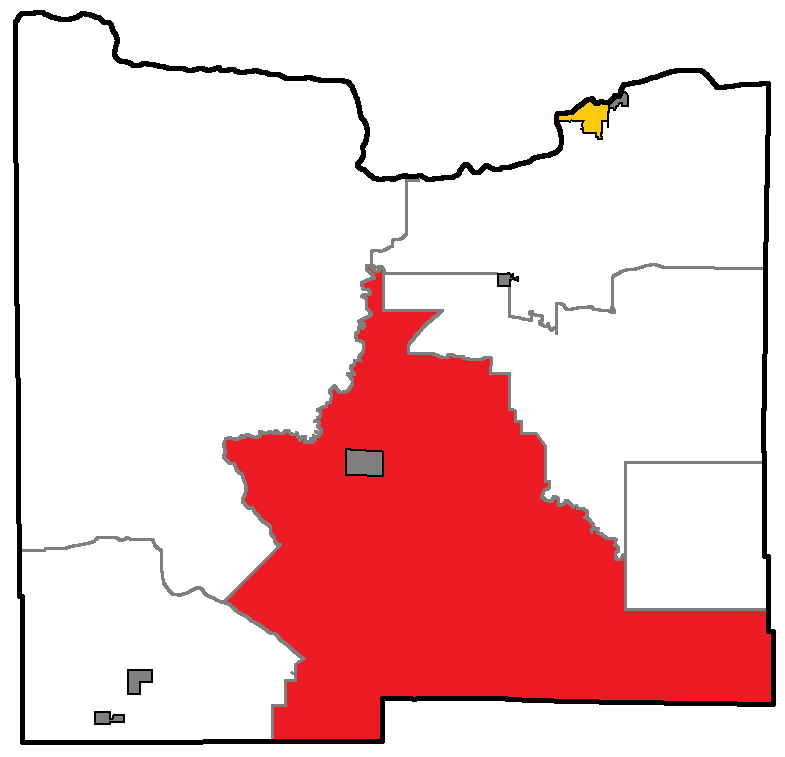
- Location of South Koochiching, within Koochiching County, Minnesota
- Coordinates: 48°03′19″N 93°39′28″W
- Country: United States
- State: Minnesota
- County: Koochiching

Area
  - Total: 845.51 sq mi (2,189.9 km^{2})
  - Land: 844.33 sq mi (2,186.8 km^{2})
  - Water: 1.18 sq mi (3.1 km^{2})

Population (2020)
  - Total: 154
  - Density: 0.182/sq mi (0.0704/km^{2})
- Time zone: UTC-6 (Central (CST))
  - Summer (DST): UTC-5 (CDT)
- Area code: 218
- GNIS feature ID: 665654

South Koochiching is an unorganized territory in Koochiching County, Minnesota, United States. The population was 154 at the 2020 United States census.

== Geography ==
According to the United States Census Bureau, the unorganized territory has a total area of 845.5 square miles (2,189.7 km^{2}), of which 844.4 square miles (2,186.9 km^{2}) is land and 1.1 square miles (2.8 km^{2}) (0.13%) is water.

== Demographics ==
As of the census of 2000, there were 267 people, 121 households, and 86 families residing in the unorganized territory. The population density was 0.3 inhabitants per square mile (0.12/km^{2}). There were 408 housing units at an average density of 0.5 per square mile (0.19/km^{2}). The racial makeup of the unorganized territory was 94.76% White, 3.75% Native American, and 1.50% from two or more races. Hispanic or Latino of any race were 0.37% of the population.

There were 121 households, out of which 22.3% had children under the age of 18 living with them, 58.7% were married couples living together, 5.0% had a female householder with no husband present, and 28.9% were non-families. 26.4% of all households were made up of individuals, and 12.4% had someone living alone who was 65 years of age or older. The average household size was 2.21 and the average family size was 2.60.

In the unorganized territory the population was spread out, with 18.0% under the age of 18, 4.9% from 18 to 24, 21.3% from 25 to 44, 33.7% from 45 to 64, and 22.1% who were 65 years of age or older. The median age was 49 years. For every 100 females, there were 118.9 males. For every 100 females age 18 and over, there were 119.0 males.

The median income for a household in the unorganized territory was $33,250, and the median income for a family was $35,417. Males had a median income of $37,188 versus $15,938 for females. The per capita income for the unorganized territory was $16,295. About 2.2% of families and 6.5% of the population were below the poverty line, including 2.4% of those under the age of 18 and 17.3% of those 65 or over.
