= Rat Root River =

Coordinates: 48°33′09″N 93°13′36″W

Location
- Country: United States

Physical characteristics
- Source
  - location: Minnesota

The Rat Root River is a river of Minnesota. It flows into the Rainy River.

Rat Root River was named for roots eaten by muskrats.

== See also ==
- List of rivers of Minnesota
