= Pine Island State Forest =

State forest in Minnesota, United States

- Location within Minnesota
- Interactive map of Pine Island State Forest

Geography
- Location: Koochiching, Beltrami, Itasca, and Lake of the Woods counties, Minnesota, United States
- Coordinates: 48°11′11″N 94°11′00″W
- Elevation: 1,197 feet (365 m)
- Area: 878,040 acres (355,330 ha)

Administration
- Established: 1933
- Authority: Minnesota DNR
- Website: www.dnr.state.mn.us/state_forests/sft00040/index.html

Ecology
- WWF Classification: Western Great Lakes Forests
- EPA Classification: Northern Lakes and Forests
- Lesser flora: Orchids

The Pine Island State Forest is a Minnesota state forest located primarily in Koochiching County, although there are portions that extend into Beltrami, Lake of the Woods, and Itasca counties. The forest borders the Koochiching State Forest to the east, the Red Lake State Forest to the west, and Big Fork State Forest and Chippewa National Forest to the south. At an area of 878,040 acres (355,330 ha), it is the largest state forest in Minnesota.

The location of Lake Agassiz in the area led to the flat topography of the forest, which is dotted with wetlands and bogs, and a sandy loam throughout. The vast expanses of old-growth northern whitecedar and pine were extensively logged in the early 20th century. But nowadays, the landscape is dominated by black spruce, tamarack, and northern whitecedar in the lowlands; aspen, pine, and balsam fir, which is predominate in upland sites.

== Recreation ==
Popular outdoor recreational activities in the forest are largely centered on the Big Fork River, and include swimming, fishing, canoeing, kayaking, and boating. Trails are designated for a variety of uses, including 168 miles (270 km) for hiking. In the wintertime, trails are designated for snowmobiling, with 2.5 miles (4.0 km) designated for cross-country skiing. Snowshoeing and hunting are available throughout the forest. To the west is the Big Bog State Recreation Area, connected by snowmobile trails to the Pine Island forest.

== See also ==
- List of Minnesota state forests
