= Minnesota State Highway 11 =

State highway in Minnesota, United States

Trunk Highway 11
- MN 11 highlighted in red

Route information
- Maintained by MnDOT
- Length: 209.971 mi (337.916 km)
- Existed: 1920–present

Major junctions
- West end: ND 66 at the Red River in Robbin
- MN 220 near Robbin; US 75 at Donaldson; US 59 at Karlstad; MN 32 at Greenbush; MN 89 / MN 310 at Roseau; MN 313 at Warroad; MN 72 / MN 172 at Baudette; US 71 at Pelland; US 53 / US 71 at Int'l. Falls
- East end: Sha Sha Resort at Dove Island

Location
- Country: United States
- State: Minnesota
- Counties: Kittson, Roseau, Lake of the Woods, Koochiching

Highway system
- Minnesota Trunk Highway System; Interstate; US; State; Legislative; Scenic
← US 10	→ US 12

Minnesota State Highway 11 (MN 11) is a 209.971-mile-long (337.916 km) highway in northwest and north-central Minnesota, which runs from North Dakota Highway 66 at the North Dakota state line (near Drayton, North Dakota) and continues east to its eastern terminus at the community of Island View on Dove Island, near International Falls.

The route follows the Rainy River between Baudette and International Falls.

== Route description ==
State Highway 11 serves as an east–west route between International Falls, Baudette, Warroad, Roseau, and Drayton, North Dakota.

The western terminus of Highway 11 is at Robbin in Teien Township, at the North Dakota state line, (near Drayton, North Dakota); where Highway 11 becomes North Dakota Highway 66 upon crossing the Red River.

The eastern terminus of the route is at the community of Island View at Rainy Lake, east of International Falls. The entrance to the Sha Sha Resort is at this point.

The Rainy Lake Visitor Center at Voyageurs National Park is located 12 miles east of International Falls near Highway 11. The Visitor Center is located immediately south of the junction of Highway 11 and County Road 96. The visitor entrance is located on County Road 96.

Franz Jevne State Park is located on Highway 11 in Koochiching County on the Rainy River (near Birchdale), between Baudette and International Falls.

Highway 11 between Warroad and Baudette is part of the promoted route MOM's Way.

== History ==
State Highway 11 was authorized in 1920 from Donaldson east to International Falls, then south through the Iron Range to Duluth. U.S. 169 was routed along this highway from 1930 to 1934. In 1934, the north–south portion was redesignated U.S. 53, and Highway 11 was extended on the east to its current terminus east of Island View; and on the west to the Red River, to what is now North Dakota Highway 66.

Sections of the route were still a primitive road in 1929. The last section of Highway 11 to be paved was between the North Dakota state line and U.S. 75 at Donaldson; this was paved by 1961.

In response to the I-35W Bridge collapse in Minneapolis on August 1, 2007, Governor Tim Pawlenty ordered the inspection of all Minnesota bridges. During an August 21, 2007 inspection, cracks were found in the Drayton Bridge (Highway 11 / Highway 66), which crosses the Red River between Drayton, North Dakota and Donaldson, Minnesota. The two cracks found in the structure were believed to be recent, within the previous six months. The bridge was inspected in March 2007 during which no cracks were found. The bridge is a major crossing for sugar beet trucks making their way to Drayton. The bridge was scheduled for replacement in 2009.

== Major intersections ==
County	Location	mi	km	Destinations	Notes
Red River of the North		0.000	0.000	ND 66 west	Continuation into North Dakota
Red River of the North		0.000	0.000	Minnesota–North Dakota line	
Kittson	Teien Township	1.909	3.072	MN 220 south – MN 1, East Grand Forks	Northern terminus of MN 220
Kittson	Donaldson	11.537	18.567	US 75 – Warren, Hallock	
Kittson	Karlstad	28.868	46.459	US 59 / Waters of the Dancing Sky Scenic Byway west – Canada, Thief River Falls	
Roseau	Greenbush	48.231	77.620	MN 32 south – Strathcona	Northern terminus of MN 32
Roseau	Ross Township	63.582	102.325	MN 308 north – Canada	Southern terminus of MN 308
Roseau	Ross Township	64.577	103.927	MN 89 north – Canada	Western end of MN 89 concurrency
Roseau	Roseau	70.679	113.747	MN 89 south / MN 310 north – Bemidji, Northwest Angle	Eastern end of MN 89 concurrency; southern terminus of MN 310
Roseau	Warroad	91.670	147.529	MN 313 north – Canada	
Lake of the Woods	Baudette Township	128.197	206.313	MN 172 north – Wheeler's Point	
Lake of the Woods	Baudette	129.170	207.879	MN 72 north – Rainy River	West end of MN 72 concurrency
Lake of the Woods	Baudette	130.864	210.605	MN 72 south – Kelliher, Blackduck	East end of MN 72 concurrency
Koochiching	Pelland	186.822	300.661	US 71 south – Bemidji	West end of US 71 concurrency
Koochiching	Rainy Lake	193.730	311.778	CSAH 332	Formerly MN 332
Koochiching	International Falls	197.991	318.636	US 71 north (3rd Street east)	East end of US 71 concurrency
Koochiching	International Falls	198.056	318.740	US 53 south (3rd Avenue West south)	West end of US 53 concurrency
Koochiching	International Falls	198.125	318.851	US 53 north – Canada	East end of US 53 concurrency
Koochiching	International Falls	198.500	319.455	CSAH 332	Formerly MN 332
Koochiching	Dove Island	210.109	338.138	Sha Sha Resort	Eastern terminus
1.000 mi = 1.609 km; 1.000 km = 0.621 mi: Concurrency terminus
