= Big Fork River =

River in Minnesota, the United States of America

Big Fork River: Achabani River; Bigfork River; Bowstring River; Busachabani River; Rivière Grande Fourche
- Mouth of the Big Fork River
- Native name: Baas-achaabaani-ziibi (Ojibwe)

Location
- Country: United States
- State: Minnesota
- Counties: Itasca; Koochiching

Physical characteristics
- Source
  - coordinates: 48.5166163°N 93.7168319°W
- Mouth: Rainy River
  - coordinates: 48.5166163°N 93.7168319°W
- Length: 168 mi (270 km)

Basin features
- River system: Rainy River

The Big Fork River (French: Rivière Grande Fourche; Ojibwe: Baas-achaabaani-ziibi) is a stream in the U.S. state of Minnesota. Starting in the Chippewa National Forest at Dora Lake, it flows for 168 mi (270 km) into the Rainy River.

== See also ==
Big Fork River is the fifth longest river totally within the state of Minnesota.

- List of rivers of Minnesota
- List of longest streams of Minnesota
- Plum Creek (Big Fork River)
