= Northome, Minnesota =

City in Minnesota, United States

Northome
- City
- Nickname: Big Bear Country
- Location of the city of Northome within Koochiching County, Minnesota

- Location in the United States
- Coordinates: 47°52′23″N 94°16′44″W
- Country: United States
- State: Minnesota
- County: Koochiching

Area
  - Total: 1.76 sq mi (4.56 km^{2})
  - Land: 1.46 sq mi (3.77 km^{2})
  - Water: 0.31 sq mi (0.79 km^{2})
- Elevation: 1,440 ft (439 m)

Population (2020)
  - Total: 155
  - Density: 106.3/sq mi (41.06/km^{2})
- Time zone: UTC-6 (Central (CST))
  - Summer (DST): UTC-5 (CDT)
- ZIP code: 56661
- Area code: 218
- FIPS code: 27-47122
- GNIS feature ID: 0657633
- Website: ci.northome.mn.us

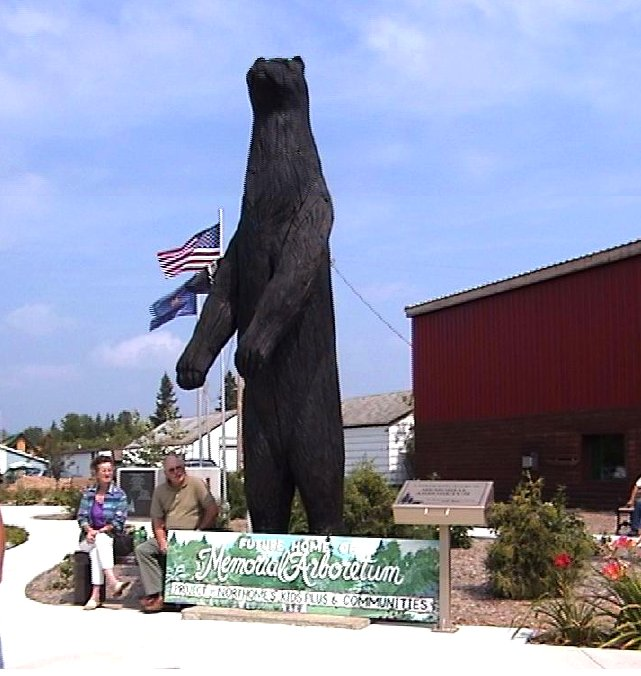
Carved wooden black bear statue at Northome

Northome is a city in the southwestern corner of Koochiching County, Minnesota, United States. The population was 155 at the 2020 census. The county seat is International Falls, about 70 miles (110 km) away.

U.S. Highway 71 and State Highways 1 and 46 meet in Northome.

== Fair ==
The Northome Fairgrounds hold the Koochiching County Fair on the second weekend of August. It celebrated its 100th anniversary in 2006.

Fair events include:

- Mudding
- Fireworks
- "Scenic Sinkhole Scramble" (since 1982): runs of a sanctioned 5k race and a "fun run" of 2 miles (3.2 km) with a stroller category
- Animal and crafts judging and a related Bear Fest parade
- Barrel racing and other equine activities

== History ==
Northome was founded in 1903 and enjoyed a boom early in the 20th century as a logging town. It is possible that the name "Northome" derives from the Norwegian place name "Norheim", which is found in four places in Norway. The name literally means "north home".

By the 1930s the big white and red pines were gone and all local pine trees were essentially extirpated due to unsustainable logging practices. Farming gained importance. Many farmers relocated to Northome from the Dust Bowl conditions in the Dakotas.

The Burlington Northern Railroad had a depot in Northome until the 1980s, but passenger service discontinued in 1960. Today the abandoned railroad bed forms the Blue Ox section of a large network of snowmobile trails.

== Geography ==
According to the United States Census Bureau, the city has an area of 1.90 square miles (4.92 km^{2}), of which 1.51 square miles (3.91 km^{2}) is land and 0.39 square miles (1.01 km^{2}) is water.

Northome is located at 47°52′19″N 94°16′48″W (47.871986, -94.280248).

There are named former townships around Northome (Bridgie, Englewood, Wildwood, etc.) but in Koochiching County all townships are unorganized. Therefore, for Census and other government purposes, the city of Northome also lends its name to the surrounding Unorganized Territory of Northome (approximately 300 square miles (800 km^{2}) of SW Koochiching County, excluding Northome and Mizpah, with 500 people in the 2000 census).

=== Economy ===
Important sources of employment in the area include the Northome School, independent resorts, logging and farming, and several stores, including the Shining Light Cafe. The Northome Record was the local newspaper from 1905 to 2007. Shortly after it ceased, a local family created the Northome Area News.

The nearest stoplight is 40 miles away in Bemidji, the regional shopping hub.

=== Wildlife ===
Northome is on the shores of Bartlett Lake; to the south is Island Lake, popular for fishing and swimming. The lake holds Northern pike, crappie, perch, and bullhead. Other smaller lakes in the area support a variety of fish, including walleye. Unlike in most of the rest of the lower 48 states, grey wolves (the Great Lakes-boreal wolf) were never eradicated from this area, and can be heard at night, though rarely seen. Bald eagles and black bears are commonly sighted. There have also been occasional reports of cougar sightings. This area is in the southern part of the Taiga, or boreal forest, with a mix of quaking aspen (colloquially called popple), balsam fir, northern white cedar, and others, including some remaining white pine and Norway pine.

=== Climate ===
Climate data for Northome 3S, Minnesota, 1991–2020 normals: 1415ft (431m)
Month	Jan	Feb	Mar	Apr	May	Jun	Jul	Aug	Sep	Oct	Nov	Dec	Year
Record high °F (°C)	52 (11)	55 (13)	67 (19)	74 (23)	87 (31)	86 (30)	92 (33)	92 (33)	85 (29)	87 (31)	75 (24)	47 (8)	92 (33)
Mean maximum °F (°C)	39.1 (3.9)	43.3 (6.3)	55.8 (13.2)	67.3 (19.6)	80.7 (27.1)	83.1 (28.4)	86.6 (30.3)	86.7 (30.4)	81.2 (27.3)	72.6 (22.6)	55.2 (12.9)	41.3 (5.2)	88.7 (31.5)
Mean daily maximum °F (°C)	16.9 (−8.4)	23.0 (−5.0)	35.0 (1.7)	49.5 (9.7)	62.8 (17.1)	72.1 (22.3)	77.1 (25.1)	75.8 (24.3)	67.0 (19.4)	52.4 (11.3)	34.7 (1.5)	21.8 (−5.7)	49.0 (9.4)
Daily mean °F (°C)	6.0 (−14.4)	10.3 (−12.1)	22.3 (−5.4)	37.8 (3.2)	51.1 (10.6)	61.6 (16.4)	65.9 (18.8)	64.1 (17.8)	55.8 (13.2)	43.3 (6.3)	27.0 (−2.8)	12.8 (−10.7)	38.2 (3.4)
Mean daily minimum °F (°C)	−4.9 (−20.5)	−2.4 (−19.1)	9.7 (−12.4)	26.2 (−3.2)	39.3 (4.1)	51.1 (10.6)	54.7 (12.6)	52.3 (11.3)	44.7 (7.1)	34.1 (1.2)	19.3 (−7.1)	3.8 (−15.7)	27.3 (−2.6)
Mean minimum °F (°C)	−33.0 (−36.1)	−28.7 (−33.7)	−17.7 (−27.6)	10.5 (−11.9)	25.7 (−3.5)	36.8 (2.7)	43.5 (6.4)	41.5 (5.3)	30.1 (−1.1)	20.5 (−6.4)	−1.7 (−18.7)	−21.8 (−29.9)	−34.5 (−36.9)
Record low °F (°C)	−45 (−43)	−44 (−42)	−33 (−36)	−4 (−20)	20 (−7)	29 (−2)	38 (3)	34 (1)	24 (−4)	13 (−11)	−20 (−29)	−38 (−39)	−45 (−43)
Average precipitation inches (mm)	0.77 (20)	0.64 (16)	1.20 (30)	1.82 (46)	3.01 (76)	4.23 (107)	3.84 (98)	3.20 (81)	3.10 (79)	2.68 (68)	1.36 (35)	1.03 (26)	26.88 (682)
Average snowfall inches (cm)	9.8 (25)	9.1 (23)	6.9 (18)	8.0 (20)	0.0 (0.0)	0.0 (0.0)	0.0 (0.0)	0.0 (0.0)	0.0 (0.0)	2.6 (6.6)	6.1 (15)	13.5 (34)	56 (141.6)
Source 1: NOAA
Source 2: XMACIS (2008-2020 snowfall, temp records & monthly max/mins)

== Demographics ==
Historical population
Census	Pop.	Note	%±
1910	206		—
1920	270		31.1%
1930	258		−4.4%
1940	343		32.9%
1950	349		1.7%
1960	291		−16.6%
1970	351		20.6%
1980	312		−11.1%
1990	283		−9.3%
2000	230		−18.7%
2010	200		−13.0%
2020	155		−22.5%
U.S. Decennial Census; 2020 Census

=== 2010 census ===
As of the census of 2010, there were 200 people, 89 households, and 53 families residing in the city. The population density was 132.5 inhabitants per square mile (51.2/km^{2}). There were 104 housing units at an average density of 68.9 per square mile (26.6/km^{2}). The racial makeup of the city was 97.0% White, 1.0% Native American, and 2.0% from two or more races.

There were 89 households, of which 23.6% had children under the age of 18 living with them, 44.9% were married couples living together, 11.2% had a female householder with no husband present, 3.4% had a male householder with no wife present, and 40.4% were non-families. 34.8% of all households were made up of individuals, and 18% had someone living alone who was 65 years of age or older. The average household size was 2.20 and the average family size was 2.83.

The median age in the city was 49.7 years. 22% of residents were under the age of 18; 6.5% were between the ages of 18 and 24; 16% were from 25 to 44; 32% were from 45 to 64; and 23.5% were 65 years of age or older. The gender makeup of the city was 47.5% male and 52.5% female.

=== 2000 census ===
As of the census of 2000, there were 230 people, 87 households, and 46 families residing in the city. The population density was 151.3 inhabitants per square mile (58.4/km^{2}). There were 113 housing units at an average density of 74.4 per square mile (28.7/km^{2}). The racial makeup of the city was 96.96% White, 1.74% Native American, and 1.30% from two or more races.

There were 87 households, out of which 26.4% had children under the age of 18 living with them, 48.3% were married couples living together, 2.3% had a female householder with no husband present, and 47.1% were non-families. 42.5% of all households were made up of individuals, and 32.2% had someone living alone who was 65 years of age or older. The average household size was 2.21 and the average family size was 3.07.

In the city, the population was spread out, with 22.6% under the age of 18, 3.9% from 18 to 24, 19.6% from 25 to 44, 23.5% from 45 to 64, and 30.4% who were 65 years of age or older. The median age was 48 years. For every 100 females, there were 71.6 males. For every 100 females age 18 and over, there were 61.8 males.

The median income for a household in the city was $25,417, and the median income for a family was $36,250. Males had a median income of $30,556 versus $20,375 for females. The per capita income for the city was $14,758. About 13.0% of families and 24.2% of the population were below the poverty line, including 22.0% of those under the age of eighteen and 20.8% of those 65 or over.

== Outdoor activities ==
Primary outdoor occupations in the area are logging timber, farming, and resorts/tourism.

Fall brings deer hunters and in winter snowmobiling is popular, supporting a small industry with a network of trails leading to nearby communities, including across the Big Bog State Recreation Area to Waskish Township. Fishing is available most of the year. In winter, temperatures occasionally dropping to −40° (F or C) create ice that can support small snowplows to clear roads on the lakes for ice-fishing.

== Media ==
=== Television ===
Channel	Callsign	Affiliation	Branding	Subchannels		Owner
(Virtual)	Callsign	Affiliation	Branding	Channel	Programming	Owner
11.1	K18JM-D (KRII Translator)	NBC	KBJR 6	11.2; 11.3	CBS; H&I/MyNetworkTV	County Of Koochiching
13.1	K16JD-D (WIRT Translator)	ABC		13.2; 13.3	MeTV; Ion Television	County Of Koochiching
