= Littlefork, Minnesota =

City in Minnesota, United States

Littlefork
- City
- Location of the city of Littlefork within Koochiching County, Minnesota
- Coordinates: 48°23′52″N 93°33′25″W
- Country: United States
- State: Minnesota
- County: Koochiching

Area
  - Total: 1.19 sq mi (3.08 km^{2})
  - Land: 1.19 sq mi (3.08 km^{2})
  - Water: 0 sq mi (0.00 km^{2})
- Elevation: 1,120 ft (340 m)

Population (2020)
  - Total: 553
  - Density: 464.6/sq mi (179.37/km^{2})
- Time zone: UTC-6 (Central (CST))
  - Summer (DST): UTC-5 (CDT)
- ZIP code: 56653
- Area code: 218
- FIPS code: 27-37592
- GNIS feature ID: 0646969
- Website: littleforkmn.gov

Littlefork is a city in Koochiching County, Minnesota, United States. The population was 553 at the 2020 census.

U.S. Highway 71 and state highways 65 and 217 are three of the main routes in Littlefork. The town was formerly on the Northern Pacific Railroad, and is now on the Blue Ox Trail.

== History ==
A post office called Littlefork has been in operation since 1902. The city was named for the nearby Little Fork River.

== Geography ==
According to the United States Census Bureau, the city has a total area of 1.19 square miles (3.08 km^{2}), all land.

=== Climate ===
Climate data for Littlefork, Minnesota, 1991–2020 normals, extremes 1994–2013: 1200ft (366m)
Month	Jan	Feb	Mar	Apr	May	Jun	Jul	Aug	Sep	Oct	Nov	Dec	Year
Record high °F (°C)	49 (9)	60 (16)	67 (19)	84 (29)	92 (33)	97 (36)	94 (34)	95 (35)	91 (33)	85 (29)	72 (22)	49 (9)	97 (36)
Mean daily maximum °F (°C)	15.4 (−9.2)	22.2 (−5.4)	35.8 (2.1)	50.4 (10.2)	64.1 (17.8)	73.3 (22.9)	77.5 (25.3)	75.9 (24.4)	66.7 (19.3)	52.0 (11.1)	35.0 (1.7)	21.6 (−5.8)	49.2 (9.5)
Daily mean °F (°C)	3.9 (−15.6)	8.9 (−12.8)	23.5 (−4.7)	38.5 (3.6)	51.7 (10.9)	61.6 (16.4)	65.8 (18.8)	64.0 (17.8)	54.9 (12.7)	41.7 (5.4)	26.7 (−2.9)	11.9 (−11.2)	37.8 (3.2)
Mean daily minimum °F (°C)	−7.6 (−22.0)	−4.3 (−20.2)	11.3 (−11.5)	26.6 (−3.0)	39.3 (4.1)	49.9 (9.9)	54.1 (12.3)	52.1 (11.2)	43.1 (6.2)	31.4 (−0.3)	18.3 (−7.6)	2.3 (−16.5)	26.4 (−3.1)
Record low °F (°C)	−49 (−45)	−50 (−46)	−35 (−37)	−4 (−20)	17 (−8)	29 (−2)	35 (2)	30 (−1)	23 (−5)	8 (−13)	−19 (−28)	−37 (−38)	−50 (−46)
Average precipitation inches (mm)	0.70 (18)	0.64 (16)	1.22 (31)	1.91 (49)	3.29 (84)	4.46 (113)	3.55 (90)	3.33 (85)	3.09 (78)	2.31 (59)	1.54 (39)	1.09 (28)	27.13 (690)
Average snowfall inches (cm)	10.6 (27)	6.5 (17)	8.2 (21)	5.1 (13)	0.1 (0.25)	0.0 (0.0)	0.0 (0.0)	0.0 (0.0)	0.0 (0.0)	2.1 (5.3)	10.0 (25)	11.9 (30)	54.5 (138.55)
Average precipitation days (≥ 0.01 in)	11.1	8.5	8.9	9.9	13.4	14.2	12.0	11.3	12.6	13.7	10.3	11.5	137.4
Average snowy days (≥ 0.1 in)	13.4	9.2	7.9	4.1	0.6	0.0	0.0	0.0	0.0	2.5	9.3	12.3	59.3
Source 1: NOAA
Source 2: National Weather Service

== Demographics ==
Historical population
Census	Pop.	Note	%±
1910	104		—
1920	397		281.7%
1930	474		19.4%
1940	608		28.3%
1950	671		10.4%
1960	805		20.0%
1970	824		2.4%
1980	918		11.4%
1990	838		−8.7%
2000	680		−18.9%
2010	647		−4.9%
2020	553		−14.5%
U.S. Decennial Census; 2020 Census

=== 2010 census ===
As of the census of 2010, there were 647 people, 258 households, and 154 families living in the city. The population density was 543.7 inhabitants per square mile (209.9/km^{2}). There were 296 housing units at an average density of 248.7 per square mile (96.0/km^{2}). The racial makeup of the city was 99.1% White, 0.2% African American, 0.3% Native American, 0.2% from other races, and 0.3% from two or more races. Hispanic or Latino of any race were 0.6% of the population.

There were 258 households, of which 24.0% had children under the age of 18 living with them, 49.2% were married couples living together, 7.4% had a female householder with no husband present, 3.1% had a male householder with no wife present, and 40.3% were non-families. 33.3% of all households were made up of individuals, and 19.4% had someone living alone who was 65 years of age or older. The average household size was 2.33 and the average family size was 3.04.

The median age in the city was 47.3 years. 23% of residents were under the age of 18; 5.7% were between the ages of 18 and 24; 18.6% were from 25 to 44; 28.8% were from 45 to 64; and 23.8% were 65 years of age or older. The gender makeup of the city was 45.7% male and 54.3% female.

=== 2000 census ===
As of the census of 2000, there were 680 people, 268 households, and 177 families living in the city. The population density was 577.1 inhabitants per square mile (222.8/km^{2}). There were 302 housing units at an average density of 256.3 per square mile (99.0/km^{2}). The racial makeup of the city was 99.41% white, and 0.59% from two or more races. Hispanic or Latino of any race were 0.74% of the population.

There were 268 households, out of which 31.3% had children under the age of 18 living with them, 54.9% were married couples living together, 7.5% had a female householder with no husband present, and 33.6% were non-families. 30.6% of all households were made up of individuals, and 17.9% had someone living alone who was 65 years of age or older. The average household size was 2.37 and the average family size was 2.97.

In the city, the population was spread out, with 25.0% under the age of 18, 5.3% from 18 to 24, 23.1% from 25 to 44, 23.5% from 45 to 64, and 23.1% who were 65 years of age or older. The median age was 43 years. For every 100 females, there were 89.4 males. For every 100 females age 18 and over, there were 88.9 males.

The median income for a household in the city was $37,917, and the median income for a family was $51,417. Males had a median income of $40,000 versus $25,313 for females. The per capita income for the city was $18,532. About 4.8% of families and 8.7% of the population were below the poverty line, including 9.8% of those under age 18 and 14.7% of those age 65 or over.

== Notable person ==
- Tim Babcock, Governor of Montana, was born in Littlefork.
