= Mizpah, Minnesota =

City in Minnesota, United States

Mizpah
- City
- Location of the city of Mizpah within Koochiching County, Minnesota
- Coordinates: 47°55′31″N 94°12′23″W
- Country: United States
- State: Minnesota
- County: Koochiching

Area
  - Total: 3.02 sq mi (7.82 km^{2})
  - Land: 3.02 sq mi (7.82 km^{2})
  - Water: 0 sq mi (0.00 km^{2})
- Elevation: 1,380 ft (420 m)

Population (2020)
  - Total: 58
  - Density: 19.2/sq mi (7.42/km^{2})
- Time zone: UTC-6 (Central (CST))
  - Summer (DST): UTC-5 (CDT)
- ZIP code: 56660
- Area code: 218
- FIPS code: 27-43540
- GNIS feature ID: 0657440

Mizpah is a city in Koochiching County, Minnesota, United States. Its population was 58 at the 2020 census.

U.S. Highway 71 and County Road 36 are two of the main routes in Mizpah.

== Geography ==
According to the United States Census Bureau, the city has a total area of 3.03 square miles (7.85 km^{2}), all land.

== History ==
A post office called Mizpah has been in operation since 1901. Mizpah is a name derived from Hebrew meaning "watchtower".

The Minnesota state record for latest measurable snowfall was recorded in Mizpah on June 4, 1935 when the town received an inch and a half of snowfall.

== Demographics ==
Historical population
Census	Pop.	Note	%±
1910	149		—
1920	212		42.3%
1930	190		−10.4%
1940	173		−8.9%
1950	166		−4.0%
1960	140		−15.7%
1970	118		−15.7%
1980	129		9.3%
1990	100		−22.5%
2000	78		−22.0%
2010	56		−28.2%
2020	58		3.6%
U.S. Decennial Census; 2020 Census

=== 2010 census ===
As of the census of 2010, there were 56 people, 28 households, and 15 families residing in the city. The population density was 18.5 inhabitants per square mile (7.1/km^{2}). There were 45 housing units at an average density of 14.9 per square mile (5.8/km^{2}). The racial makeup of the city was 98.2% White and 1.8% Asian.

There were 28 households, of which 32.1% had children under the age of 18 living with them, 28.6% were married couples living together, 17.9% had a female householder with no husband present, 7.1% had a male householder with no wife present, and 46.4% were non-families. 35.7% of all households were made up of individuals, and 17.8% had someone living alone who was 65 years of age or older. The average household size was 2.00 and the average family size was 2.47.

The median age in the city was 39.5 years. 23.2% of residents were under the age of 18; 7.2% were between the ages of 18 and 24; 23.3% were from 25 to 44; 23.2% were from 45 to 64; and 23.2% were 65 years of age or older. The gender makeup of the city was 53.6% male and 46.4% female.

=== 2000 census ===
As of the census of 2000, there were 78 people, 31 households, and 19 families residing in the city. The population density was 25.7 people per square mile (9.9/km^{2}). There were 51 housing units at an average density of 16.8 per square mile (6.5/km^{2}). The racial makeup of the city was 85.90% White and 14.10% Native American. Hispanic or Latino of any race were 1.28% of the population.

There were 31 households, out of which 29.0% had children under the age of 18 living with them, 54.8% were married couples living together, 9.7% had a female householder with no husband present, and 35.5% were non-families. 29.0% of all households were made up of individuals, and 19.4% had someone living alone who was 65 years of age or older. The average household size was 2.52 and the average family size was 3.25.

In the city, the population was spread out, with 28.2% under the age of 18, 5.1% from 18 to 24, 25.6% from 25 to 44, 23.1% from 45 to 64, and 17.9% who were 65 years of age or older. The median age was 38 years. For every 100 females, there were 122.9 males. For every 100 females age 18 and over, there were 115.4 males.

The median income for a household in the city was $34,375, and the median income for a family was $53,125. Males had a median income of $28,750 versus $25,000 for females. The per capita income for the city was $18,519. 19.0% of families and 25.7% of the population were living below the poverty line, including 69.2% of those under the age of 18 and none of those ages 65 or older.
