= Rainy Lake, Minnesota =

Unorganized territory of Koochiching County, Minnesota, United States

- Unorganized territory
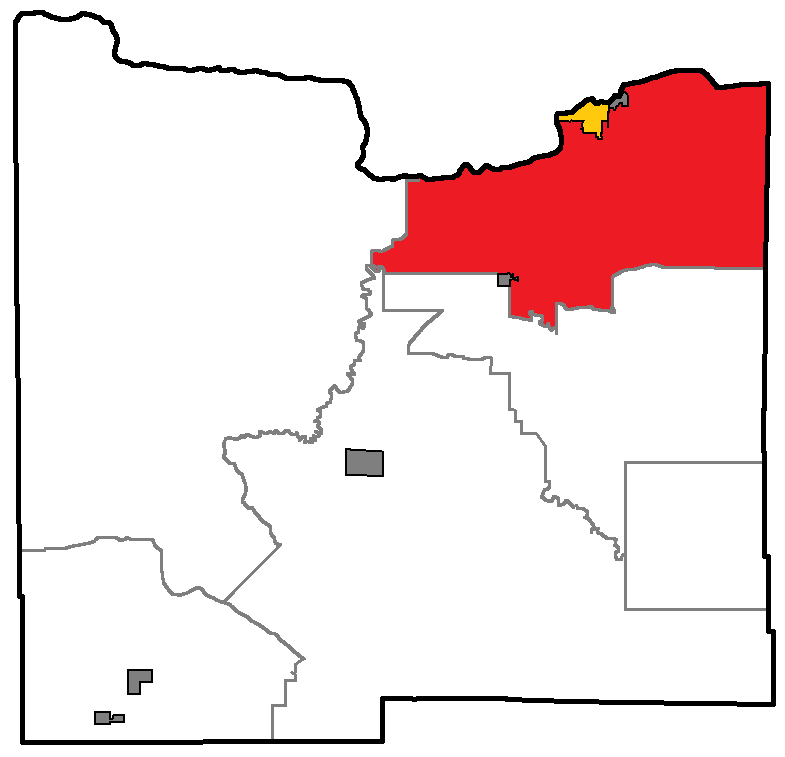
- Location of Rainy Lake, within Koochiching County, Minnesota
- Coordinates: 48°37′24″N 93°17′39″W
- Country: United States
- State: Minnesota
- County: Koochiching

Area
  - Total: 386.55 sq mi (1,001.2 km^{2})
  - Land: 351.36 sq mi (910.0 km^{2})
  - Water: 35.19 sq mi (91.1 km^{2})

Population (2020)
  - Total: 3,261
  - Density: 9.281/sq mi (3.583/km^{2})
- Time zone: UTC-6 (Central (CST))
  - Summer (DST): UTC-5 (CDT)
- Area code: 218
- GNIS feature ID: 665373

Rainy Lake is an unorganized territory in Koochiching County, Minnesota, United States. The population was 3,261 at the 2020 census.

== Geography ==
According to the United States Census Bureau, the unorganized territory has a total area of 387.2 square miles (1,002.8 km^{2}), of which 350.2 square miles (906.9 km^{2}) is land and 37.0 square miles (95.9 km^{2}) (9.56%) is water.

== Demographics ==
As of the census of 2000, there were 4,469 people, 1,774 households, and 1,332 families residing in the unorganized territory. The population density was 12.8 inhabitants per square mile (4.9/km^{2}). There were 2,248 housing units at an average density of 6.4 per square mile (2.5/km^{2}). The racial makeup of the unorganized territory was 97.67% White, 0.16% Black or African American, 0.87% Native American, 0.20% Asian, 0.11% from other races, and 0.98% from two or more races. Hispanic or Latino of any race were 0.31% of the population.

There were 1,774 households, out of which 30.2% had children under the age of 18 living with them, 65.8% were married couples living together, 6.0% had a female householder with no husband present, and 24.9% were non-families. 20.9% of all households were made up of individuals, and 7.4% had someone living alone who was 65 years of age or older. The average household size was 2.52 and the average family size was 2.91.

In the unorganized territory the population was spread out, with 24.6% under the age of 18, 4.7% from 18 to 24, 27.8% from 25 to 44, 30.5% from 45 to 64, and 12.4% who were 65 years of age or older. The median age was 41 years. For every 100 females, there were 106.7 males. For every 100 females age 18 and over, there were 105.4 males.

The median income for a household in the unorganized territory was $46,250, and the median income for a family was $51,791. Males had a median income of $42,622 versus $25,895 for females. The per capita income for the unorganized territory was $21,404. About 5.1% of families and 6.6% of the population were below the poverty line, including 8.1% of those under age 18 and 12.0% of those age 65 or over.
