= Northwest Koochiching, Minnesota =

Unorganized territory of Koochiching County, Minnesota, United States

- Unorganized territory
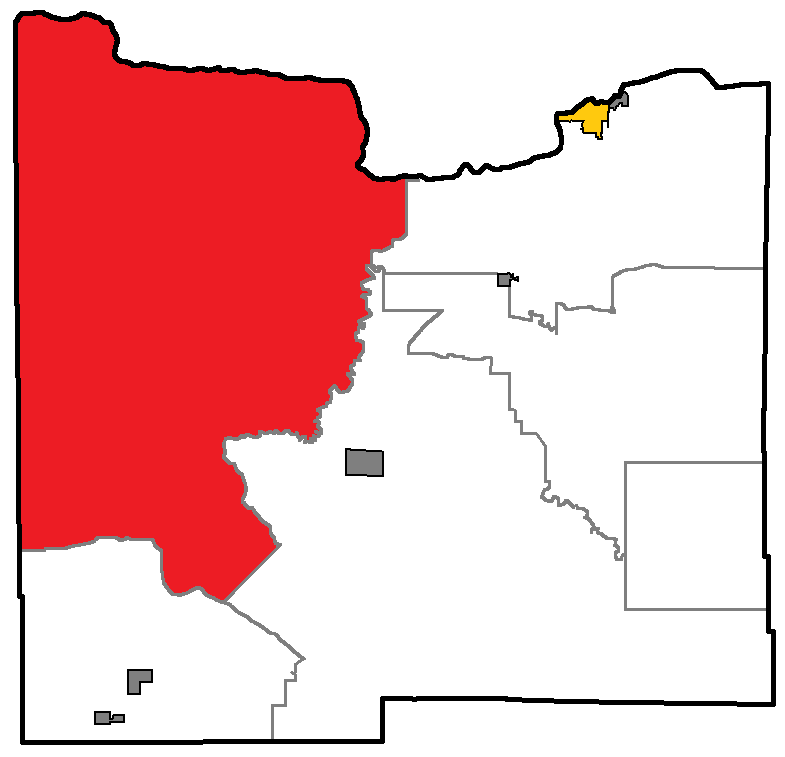
- Location of Northwest Koochiching, within Koochiching County, Minnesota
- Coordinates: 48°21′37″N 94°09′19″W
- Country: United States
- State: Minnesota
- County: Koochiching

Area
  - Total: 1,081.07 sq mi (2,800.0 km^{2})
  - Land: 1,076.42 sq mi (2,787.9 km^{2})
  - Water: 4.65 sq mi (12.0 km^{2})

Population (2020)
  - Total: 477
  - Density: 0.443/sq mi (0.171/km^{2})
- Time zone: UTC-6 (Central (CST))
  - Summer (DST): UTC-5 (CDT)
- Area code: 218
- GNIS feature ID: 665174

Northwest Koochiching is an unorganized territory in Koochiching County, Minnesota, United States. The population was 477 at the 2020 United States census.

== Geography ==
According to the United States Census Bureau, the unorganized territory has a total area of 1,080.5 square miles (2,798.5 km^{2}), of which 1,077.1 square miles (2,789.7 km^{2}) is land and 3.4 square miles (8.8 km^{2}) (0.31%) is water.

== Demographics ==
As of the census of 2000, there were 541 people, 230 households, and 158 families residing in the unorganized territory. The population density was 0.5 inhabitants per square mile (0.19/km^{2}). There were 426 housing units at an average density of 0.4 per square mile (0.15/km^{2}). The racial makeup of the unorganized territory was 98.52% White, 0.18% Native American, and 1.29% from two or more races.

There were 230 households, out of which 27.4% had children under the age of 18 living with them, 62.2% were married couples living together, 2.6% had a female householder with no husband present, and 31.3% were non-families. 28.7% of all households were made up of individuals, and 14.3% had someone living alone who was 65 years of age or older. The average household size was 2.35 and the average family size was 2.88.

In the unorganized territory the population was spread out, with 23.5% under the age of 18, 4.4% from 18 to 24, 25.1% from 25 to 44, 27.5% from 45 to 64, and 19.4% who were 65 years of age or older. The median age was 43 years. For every 100 females, there were 109.7 males. For every 100 females age 18 and over, there were 111.2 males.

The median income for a household in the unorganized territory was $33,750, and the median income for a family was $40,833. Males had a median income of $36,818 versus $23,542 for females. The per capita income for the unorganized territory was $15,940. About 9.5% of families and 13.5% of the population were below the poverty line, including 10.1% of those under age 18 and 31.5% of those age 65 or over.
