= Morcom Township, St. Louis County, Minnesota =

Morcom Township, Minnesota
- Township
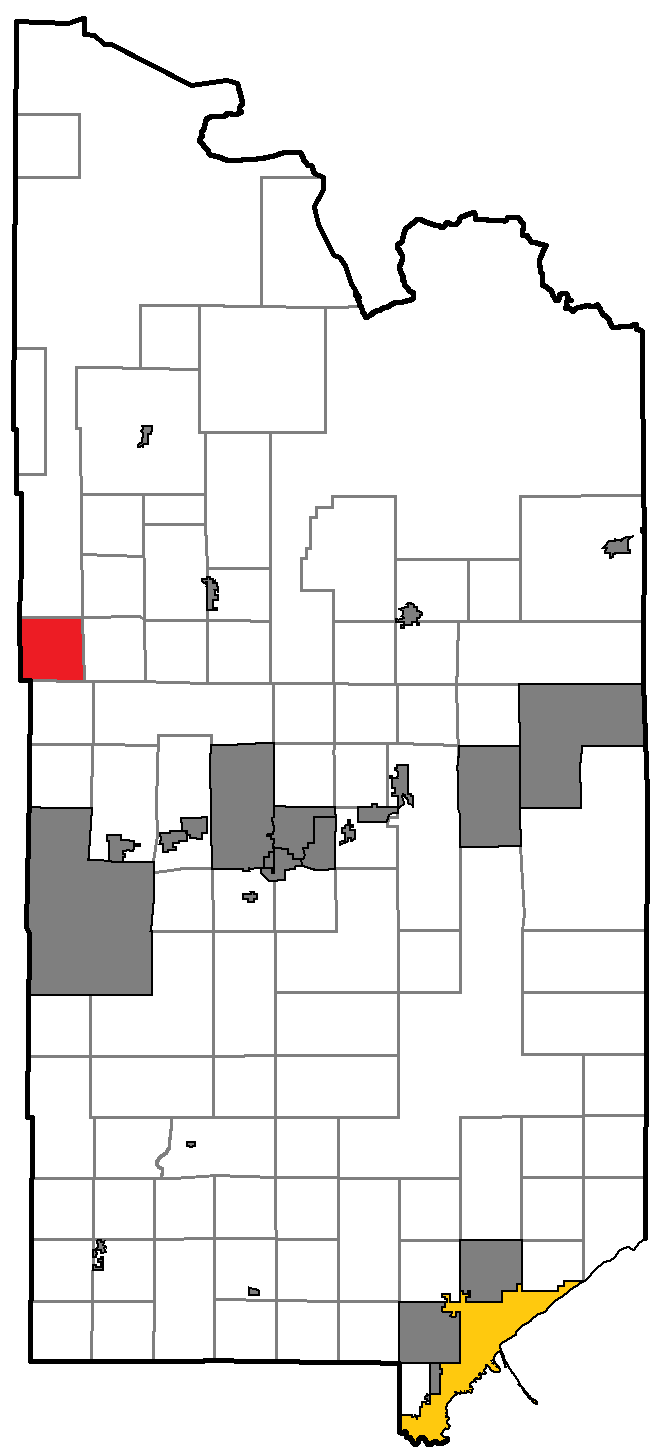
- Location of Morcom Township within St. Louis County, Minnesota
- Coordinates: 47°46′57″N 93°0′32″W
- Country: United States
- State: Minnesota
- County: Saint Louis

Area
  - Total: 35.9 sq mi (93.0 km^{2})
  - Land: 35.9 sq mi (93.0 km^{2})
  - Water: 0 sq mi (0.0 km^{2})
- Elevation: 1,319 ft (402 m)

Population (2010)
  - Total: 94
  - Density: 2.6/sq mi (1.0/km^{2})
- Time zone: UTC-6 (Central (CST))
  - Summer (DST): UTC-5 (CDT)
- FIPS code: 27-44098
- GNIS feature ID: 0665032

Morcom Township is a township in Saint Louis County, Minnesota, United States. The population was 75 at the 2020 census.

Saint Louis County Highways 5 and 22 are two of the main routes in the township.

The unincorporated community of Bear River is located within Morcom Township.

== History ==
Morcom Township was named for Elisha Morcom, a businessperson in the mining industry and afterward county official.

== Geography ==
According to the United States Census Bureau, the township has a total area of 35.9 square miles (93.0 km^{2}), all land.

The Bear River, a tributary of the Sturgeon River, flows through the northwest part of Morcom Township. The Sturgeon River flows through the northeast corner of the township.

Stoney Brook and Bear River Creek flow through the western portion of the township. Sand Creek flows through the eastern portion of the township.

Part of Morcom Township is located within the Superior National Forest in Saint Louis County.

=== Adjacent townships and communities ===
The following are adjacent to Morcom Township :

- Sturgeon Township (east)
- The unincorporated community of Sturgeon (east)
- Linden Grove Township (northeast)
- The unincorporated community of Linden Grove (northeast)
- The unincorporated community of Meadow Brook (northeast)
- Sturgeon River Unorganized Territory (north)
- The unincorporated community of Celina (north)
- Carpenter Township of Itasca County (northwest)
- The unincorporated community of Togo (northwest)
- Bearville Township of Itasca County (west and southwest)
- French Township (south)
- The unincorporated community of Side Lake (south)
- Dark River Unorganized Territory (southeast)

=== Unincorporated communities ===
- Bear River

== Demographics ==
At the 2000 census there were 115 people, 46 households, and 32 families living in the township. The population density was 3.2 people per square mile (1.2/km^{2}). There were 61 housing units at an average density of 1.7/sq mi (0.7/km^{2}). The racial makeup of the township was 95.65% White and 4.35% Native American. Of the 46 households 30.4% had children under the age of 18 living with them, 56.5% were married couples living together, 10.9% had a female householder with no husband present, and 30.4% were non-families. 26.1% of households were one person and 13.0% were one person aged 65 or older. The average household size was 2.50 and the average family size was 3.06.

The age distribution was 24.3% under the age of 18, 7.0% from 18 to 24, 28.7% from 25 to 44, 27.0% from 45 to 64, and 13.0% 65 or older. The median age was 40 years. For every 100 females, there were 91.7 males. For every 100 females age 18 and over, there were 85.1 males.

The median household income was $35,972 and the median family income was $37,321. Males had a median income of $40,625 versus $36,250 for females. The per capita income for the township was $14,721. There were 11.4% of families and 14.6% of the population living below the poverty line, including 27.9% of under eighteens and 8.3% of those over 64.

== Media ==
The official newspaper of Morcom is The Timberjay. The Timberjay is published weekly, with a circulation of over 1000.
