= Sturgeon Township, St. Louis County, Minnesota =

Sturgeon Township, Minnesota
- Township
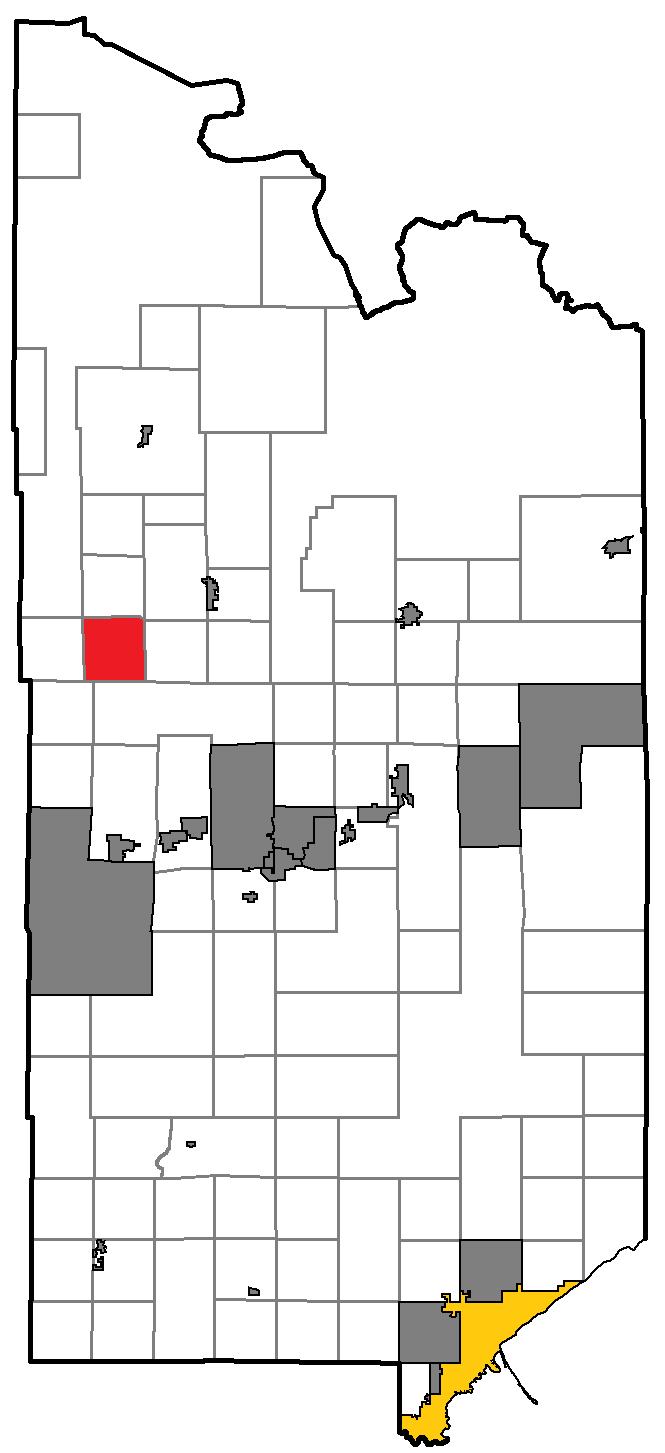
- Location of Sturgeon Township within St. Louis County, Minnesota
- Coordinates: 47°46′12″N 92°52′48″W
- Country: United States
- State: Minnesota
- County: Saint Louis

Area
  - Total: 36.9 sq mi (95.7 km^{2})
  - Land: 36.9 sq mi (95.7 km^{2})
  - Water: 0 sq mi (0.0 km^{2})
- Elevation: 1,296 ft (395 m)

Population (2020)
  - Total: 144
  - Density: 3.90/sq mi (1.50/km^{2})
- Time zone: UTC-6 (Central (CST))
  - Summer (DST): UTC-5 (CDT)
- FIPS code: 27-63202
- GNIS feature ID: 0665729

Sturgeon Township is a township in Saint Louis County, Minnesota, United States. The population was 144 at the 2020 census.

State Highway 73 (MN 73) and Saint Louis County Road 22 (CR 22) are two of the main routes in the township. Highway 73 runs north–south through the township. County 22 runs east–west through the township.

The unincorporated community of Sturgeon is located within Sturgeon Township.

The southern portion of Sturgeon Township is located within the Superior National Forest in Saint Louis County.

The Sturgeon River State Forest is also located in a portion of Sturgeon Township.

== Geography ==
According to the United States Census Bureau, the township has a total area of 36.9 square miles (96 km^{2}), all land.

The unincorporated community of Sturgeon, within Sturgeon Township, is located 14 miles southwest of Cook; and 20 miles north of Chisholm.

The Sturgeon River flows through the township, giving the town its name. The river runs roughly diagonally throughout Sturgeon Township, in a northwest–southeast direction.

Gilmore Creek flows through the southeast portion of Sturgeon Township.

=== Adjacent townships and communities ===
The following are adjacent to Sturgeon Township :

- Alango Township (east)
- The unincorporated community of Angora (east)
- Field Township (northeast)
- The city of Cook (northeast)
- Linden Grove Township (north)
- The unincorporated community of Linden Grove (north)
- The unincorporated community of Meadow Brook (north-northwest)
- Sturgeon River Unorganized Territory (northwest)
- The unincorporated community of Celina (northwest)
- Morcom Township (west)
- The unincorporated community of Bear River (west)
- French Township (southwest)
- The unincorporated community of Side Lake (southwest)
- Dark River Unorganized Territory (south)
- Leander Lake Unorganized Territory (southeast)
- The unincorporated area of Britt (southeast)

=== Unincorporated communities ===
- Sturgeon

== Demographics ==
As of the census of 2000, there were 116 people, 45 households, and 34 families residing in the township. The population density was 3.1 people per square mile (1.2/km^{2}). There were 64 housing units at an average density of 1.7/sq mi (0.7/km^{2}). The racial makeup of the township was 97.41% White and 2.59% Native American.

There were 45 households, out of which 26.7% had children under the age of 18 living with them, 68.9% were married couples living together, 4.4% had a female householder with no husband present, and 24.4% were non-families. 24.4% of all households were made up of individuals, and 4.4% had someone living alone who was 65 years of age or older. The average household size was 2.58 and the average family size was 3.06.

In the township the population was spread out, with 22.4% under the age of 18, 5.2% from 18 to 24, 31.0% from 25 to 44, 25.9% from 45 to 64, and 15.5% who were 65 years of age or older. The median age was 40 years. For every 100 females, there were 118.9 males. For every 100 females age 18 and over, there were 125.0 males.

The median income for a household in the township was $35,469, and the median income for a family was $43,750. Males had a median income of $36,875 versus $16,250 for females. The per capita income for the township was $12,677. There were no families and 8.2% of the population living below the poverty line, including no under eighteens and 16.7% of those over 64.
