= Linden Grove Township, St. Louis County, Minnesota =

Linden Grove Township, Minnesota
- Township
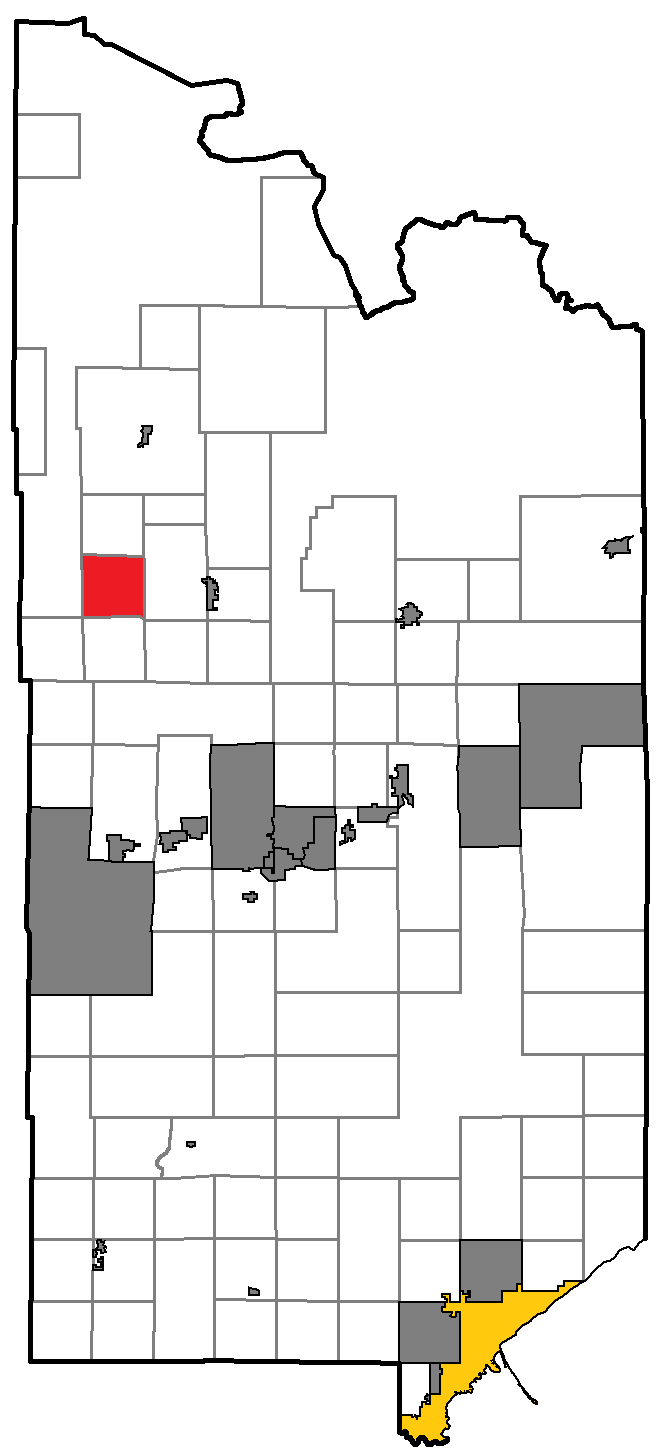
- Location of Linden Grove within St. Louis County, Minnesota
- Coordinates: 47°51′17″N 92°53′5″W
- Country: United States
- State: Minnesota
- County: Saint Louis

Area
  - Total: 35.4 sq mi (91.8 km^{2})
  - Land: 35.4 sq mi (91.8 km^{2})
  - Water: 0 sq mi (0.0 km^{2})
- Elevation: 1,302 ft (397 m)

Population (2020)
  - Total: 113
  - Density: 3.19/sq mi (1.23/km^{2})
- Time zone: UTC-6 (Central (CST))
  - Summer (DST): UTC-5 (CDT)
- FIPS code: 27-37250
- GNIS feature ID: 0664789

Linden Grove Township is a township in Saint Louis County, Minnesota, United States. The population was 113 at the 2020 census.

State Highway 1 (MN 1) and State Highway 73 (MN 73) are two of the main routes in the township. Highway 1 runs east–west through the township. Highway 73 runs north–south through the township.

The unincorporated communities of Meadow Brook and Linden Grove are located within Linden Grove Township. Cook and Orr are both nearby.

Linden Grove Township was named for the groves of linden trees within its borders.

== Geography ==
According to the United States Census Bureau, Linden Grove Township has a total area of 35.4 square miles (92 km^{2}), all land.

The unincorporated community of Linden Grove, within Linden Grove Township, is located 14 miles south of Orr, and eight miles west of Cook.

The Little Fork River flows through the northwest, central, and southeast portions of Linden Grove Township.

Beaver Creek flows through the northwest part of the township.

The west–central and southern portions of Linden Grove Township are located within the Sturgeon River State Forest.

=== Adjacent townships and communities ===
The following are adjacent to Linden Grove Township:

- Field Township (east and northeast)
- Alango Township (southeast)
- Sturgeon Township (south)
- The unincorporated community of Sturgeon (south)
- Morcom Township (southwest)
- The unincorporated community of Bear River (southwest)
- Sturgeon River Unorganized Territory (west)
- The unincorporated community of Celina (west)
- Northwest Saint Louis Unorganized Territory (northwest)
- The unincorporated community of Greaney (northwest)
- Willow Valley Township (north)
- The unincorporated community of Gheen Corner (northeast)
- Kabetogama State Forest (north)

=== Unincorporated communities ===
- Linden Grove
- Meadow Brook

Carpenter Road runs north–south along Linden Grove Township's eastern boundary line with adjacent Field Township.

Olson Road runs east–west along Linden Grove Township's northern boundary line with adjacent Willow Valley Township in the northwest and north–central part of Linden Grove Township.

Range Line Road–County Road 139 (CR 139) runs north–south along Linden Grove Township's western boundary line with adjacent Sturgeon River Unorganized Territory. The roadway is in two separate disjointed sections.

Leander Road runs east–west along Linden Grove Township's southern boundary line with adjacent Sturgeon Township in the southwest corner of Linden Grove Township.

== Demographics ==
As of the census of 2000, there were 141 people, 54 households, and 38 families residing in the township. The population density was 4.0 inhabitants per square mile (1.5/km^{2}). There were 89 housing units at an average density of 2.5 per square mile (0.97/km^{2}). The racial makeup of the township was 90.78% White, 3.55% Native American, 3.55% Asian, and 2.13% from two or more races.

There were 54 households, out of which 42.6% had children under the age of 18 living with them, 59.3% were married couples living together, 7.4% had a female householder with no husband present, and 29.6% were non-families. 24.1% of all households were made up of individuals, and 7.4% had someone living alone who was 65 years of age or older. The average household size was 2.61 and the average family size was 3.13.

In the township the population was spread out, with 32.6% under the age of 18, 2.8% from 18 to 24, 31.9% from 25 to 44, 22.0% from 45 to 64, and 10.6% who were 65 years of age or older. The median age was 39 years. For every 100 females, there were 113.6 males. For every 100 females age 18 and over, there were 106.5 males.

The median income for a household in the township was $38,500, and the median income for a family was $48,125. Males had a median income of $34,167 versus $23,125 for females. The per capita income for the township was $18,004. There were none of the families and 3.1% of the population living below the poverty line, including no under eighteens and none of those over 64.
