= Willow Valley Township, St. Louis County, Minnesota =

Willow Valley Township, Minnesota
- Township
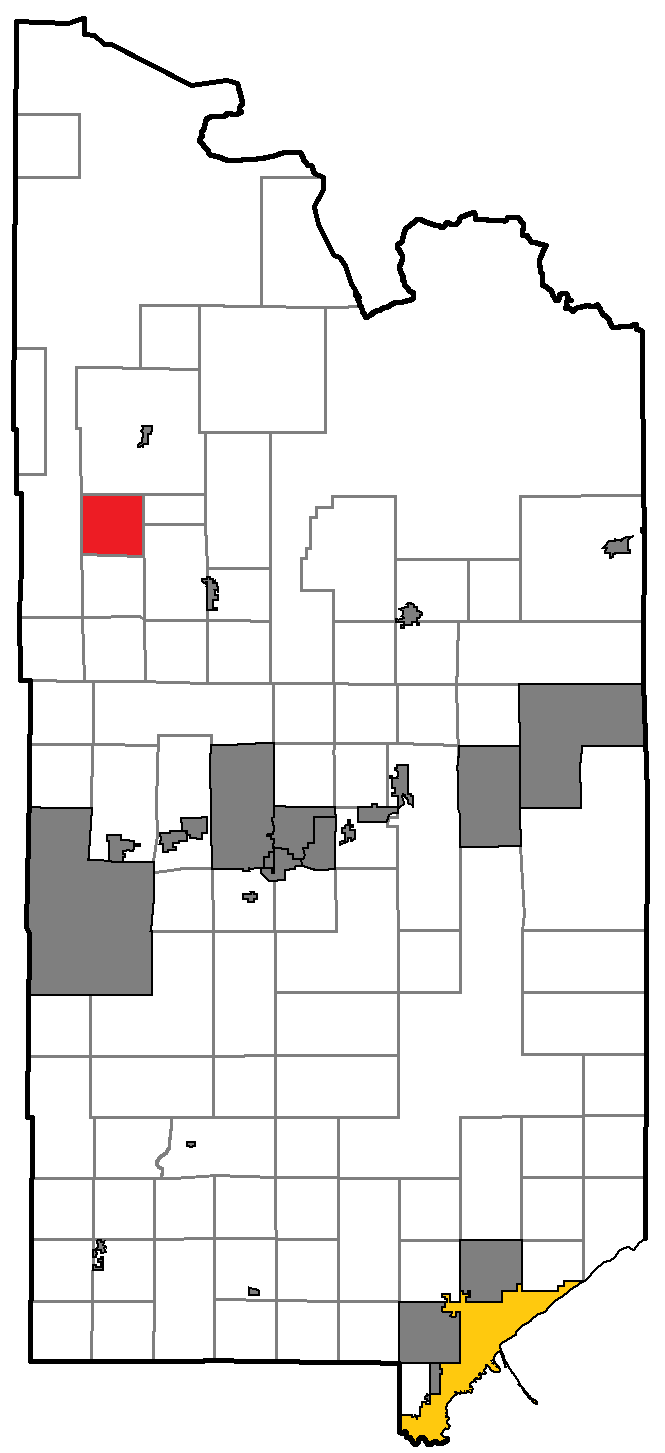
- Location of Willow Valley Township within St. Louis County, Minnesota
- Coordinates: 47°57′17″N 92°52′58″W
- Country: United States
- State: Minnesota
- County: Saint Louis

Area
  - Total: 34.9 sq mi (90.4 km^{2})
  - Land: 34.9 sq mi (90.4 km^{2})
  - Water: 0 sq mi (0.0 km^{2})
- Elevation: 1,358 ft (414 m)

Population (2020)
  - Total: 112
  - Density: 3.21/sq mi (1.24/km^{2})
- Time zone: UTC-6 (Central (CST))
  - Summer (DST): UTC-5 (CDT)
- FIPS code: 27-70510
- GNIS feature ID: 0666003

Willow Valley Township is a township in Saint Louis County, Minnesota, United States. The population was 112 at the 2020 census.

State Highway 73 (MN 73) and Saint Louis County Road 74 (Willow River Road) are two of the main routes in the township.

U.S. Highway 53 runs north–south along Willow Valley Township's eastern boundary line at the northeast side. Highway 73 passes through the southeast portion of the township. Willow River Road runs east–west through the northern portion of the township.

County Road 406–Chisholm Road runs north–south through the township.

The unincorporated community of Gheen Corner is located at the northeast edge of Willow Valley Township.

Cook and Orr are both nearby.

== Geography ==
According to the United States Census Bureau, the township has a total area of 34.9 square miles (90 km^{2}), all land.

The Willow River, a tributary of the Little Fork River, flows through the northern portion of Willow Valley Township.

Beaver Creek flows through the south–central part of the township.

The central, south–central, and southeast portions of Willow Valley Township are located within the Kabetogama State Forest.

=== Adjacent townships and communities ===
The following are adjacent to Willow Valley Township:

- Linden Grove Township (south)
- The unincorporated community of Linden Grove (south)
- Field Township (east and southeast)
- Gheen Unorganized Territory (east)
- The unincorporated community of Gheen (east)
- Leiding Township (north and northeast)
- Pelican Lake (north)
- Northwest Saint Louis Unorganized Territory (west and northwest)
- The unincorporated community of Greaney (west)
- Sturgeon River Unorganized Territory (southwest)
- The unincorporated community of Celina (southwest)

The city of Orr is nearby to the north-northeast, but does not border the township.

Nett Lake Indian Reservation – Bois Forte Indian Reservation is nearby to the northwest, but does not border Willow Valley Township.

=== Unincorporated communities ===
- Gheen Corner

Olson Road runs east–west along Willow Valley Township's southern boundary line with adjacent Linden Grove Township in the southwest and south–central part of Willow Valley Township.

Range Line Road–UT Road 8109 runs north–south along Willow Valley Township's western boundary line with adjacent Northwest Saint Louis Unorganized Territory in the northwest corner of Willow Valley Township.

Highway 119 (CR 119) runs north–south through the northwest portion of Willow Valley Township; the roadway continues north to nearby Leiding Township and Orr.

Carpenter Road–County Road 481 (CR 481) briefly runs north–south along Willow Valley Township's eastern boundary line with adjacent Field Township at the southeast side.

U.S. Highway 53 runs north–south along Willow Valley Township's eastern boundary line with adjacent Gheen Unorganized Territory at the northeast side.

== Demographics ==
As of the census of 2000, there were 139 people, 55 households, and 37 families residing in the township. The population density was 4.0 people per square mile (1.5/km^{2}). There were 87 housing units at an average density of 2.5/sq mi (1.0/km^{2}). The racial makeup of the township was 91.37% White, 7.91% Native American, and 0.72% from two or more races.

There were 55 households, out of which 41.8% had children under the age of 18 living with them, 50.9% were married couples living together, 10.9% had a female householder with no husband present, and 32.7% were non-families. 29.1% of all households were made up of individuals, and 12.7% had someone living alone who was 65 years of age or older. The average household size was 2.53 and the average family size was 3.08.

In the township the population was spread out, with 31.7% under the age of 18, 9.4% from 18 to 24, 18.7% from 25 to 44, 30.2% from 45 to 64, and 10.1% who were 65 years of age or older. The median age was 37 years. For every 100 females, there were 107.5 males. For every 100 females age 18 and over, there were 106.5 males.

The median income for a household in the township was $30,000, and the median income for a family was $38,750. Males had a median income of $50,000 versus $38,125 for females. The per capita income for the township was $15,012. There were none of the families and 4.0% of the population living below the poverty line, including no under eighteens and 15.0% of those over 64.
