= Beatty Township, St. Louis County, Minnesota =

Beatty Township, Minnesota
- Township
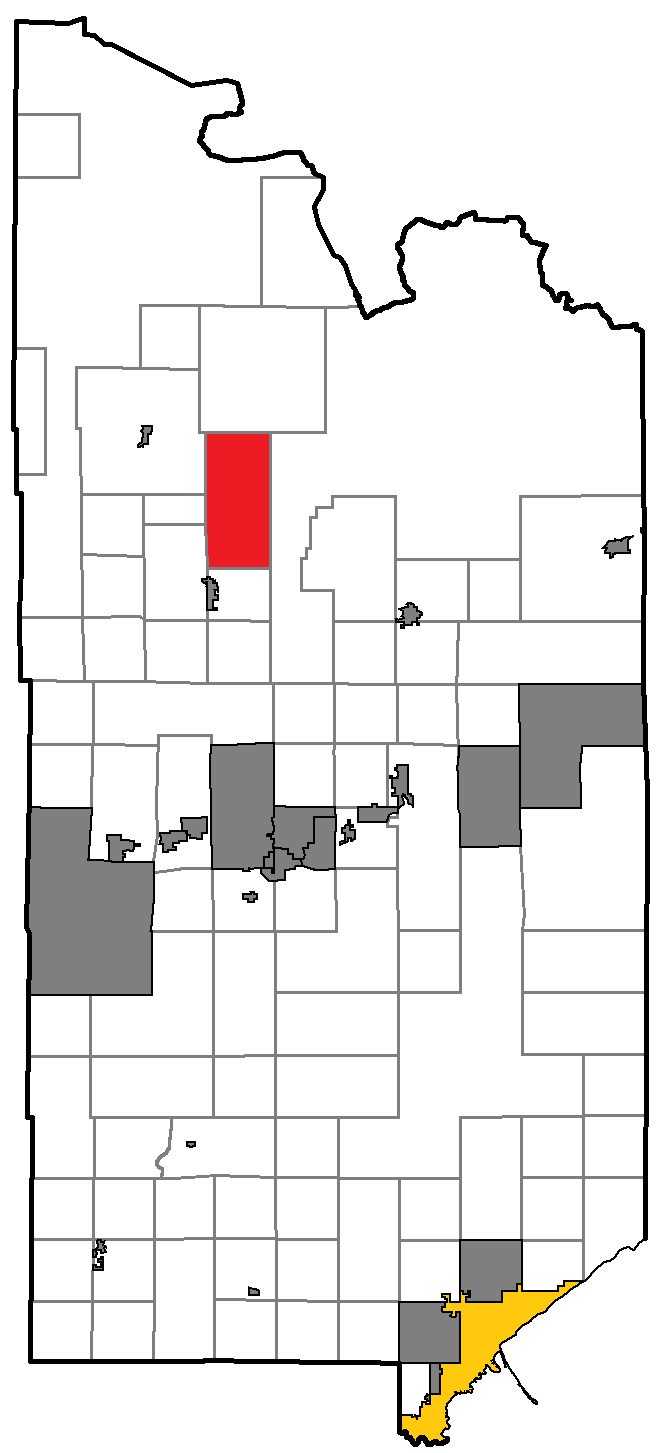
- Location of Beatty Township within St. Louis County, Minnesota
- Coordinates: 47°56′52″N 92°37′49″W
- Country: United States
- State: Minnesota
- County: Saint Louis

Area
  - Total: 79.9 sq mi (207.0 km^{2})
  - Land: 65.2 sq mi (168.9 km^{2})
  - Water: 14.7 sq mi (38.1 km^{2})
- Elevation: 1,380 ft (420 m)

Population (2020)
  - Total: 418
  - Density: 6.41/sq mi (2.47/km^{2})
- Time zone: UTC-6 (Central (CST))
  - Summer (DST): UTC-5 (CDT)
- FIPS code: 27-04294
- GNIS feature ID: 0663533

Beatty Township is a township in Saint Louis County, Minnesota, United States. Beatty Township bears the name of a family of pioneer settlers. The population was 418 at the 2020 census.

Saint Louis County Road 24 (Vermilion Drive) serves as a main route in the township.

The unincorporated community of Wakemup is located within Beatty Township. Cook is nearby.

Beatty Township is located along part of Lake Vermilion.

== Geography ==
According to the United States Census Bureau, the township has a total area of 79.9 square miles (207 km^{2}); 65.2 square miles (169 km^{2}) is land and 14.7 square miles (38 km^{2}), or 18.41%, is water.

Black Bay and Wakemup Bay of Lake Vermilion are located within Beatty Township.

The Elbow River flows through the northern part of the township near Elbow Lake.

Hoodoo Creek, Black Creek, and North Creek all flow through the central portion of the township. Flint Creek flows through the southern portion of Beatty Township. A majority of the township is located within the Kabetogama State Forest.

=== Adjacent townships and communities ===
The following are adjacent to Beatty Township:

- Owens Township (south)
- Field Township (southwest and west)
- Gheen Unorganized Territory (west)
- The unincorporated community of Gheen (west)
- The unincorporated community of Gheen Corner (west)
- Leiding Township (west and northwest)
- Portage Township (north and northeast)
- The unincorporated community of Buyck (northeast)
- The unincorporated community of Vermilion Dam (east)
- Northeast Saint Louis Unorganized Territory (east)

The city of Cook is nearby to the south, but does not border the township.

The city of Orr is nearby to the northwest, but does not border the township.

=== Unincorporated communities ===
- Wakemup

== Demographics ==
As of the census of 2000, there were 434 people, 198 households, and 149 families residing in the township. The population density was 6.7 inhabitants per square mile (2.6/km^{2}). There were 681 housing units at an average density of 10.4 per square mile (4.0/km^{2}). The racial makeup of the township was 97.93% White, 0.23% Native American, 0.92% from other races, and 0.92% from two or more races. Hispanic or Latino of any race were 0.46% of the population.

There were 198 households, out of which 18.2% had children under the age of 18 living with them, 72.7% were married couples living together, 2.0% had a female householder with no husband present, and 24.7% were non-families. 22.2% of all households were made up of individuals, and 8.1% had someone living alone who was 65 years of age or older. The average household size was 2.19 and the average family size was 2.53.

In the township the population was spread out, with 15.9% under the age of 18, 3.0% from 18 to 24, 17.7% from 25 to 44, 40.8% from 45 to 64, and 22.6% who were 65 years of age or older. The median age was 51 years. For every 100 females, there were 112.7 males. For every 100 females age 18 and over, there were 113.5 males.

The median income for a household in the township was $43,542, and the median income for a family was $57,813. Males had a median income of $42,500 versus $26,786 for females. The per capita income for the township was $23,118. About 3.8% of families and 6.6% of the population were below the poverty line, including 7.5% of those under age 18 and 4.5% of those age 65 or over.
