= French Township, St. Louis County, Minnesota =

French Township, Minnesota
- Township
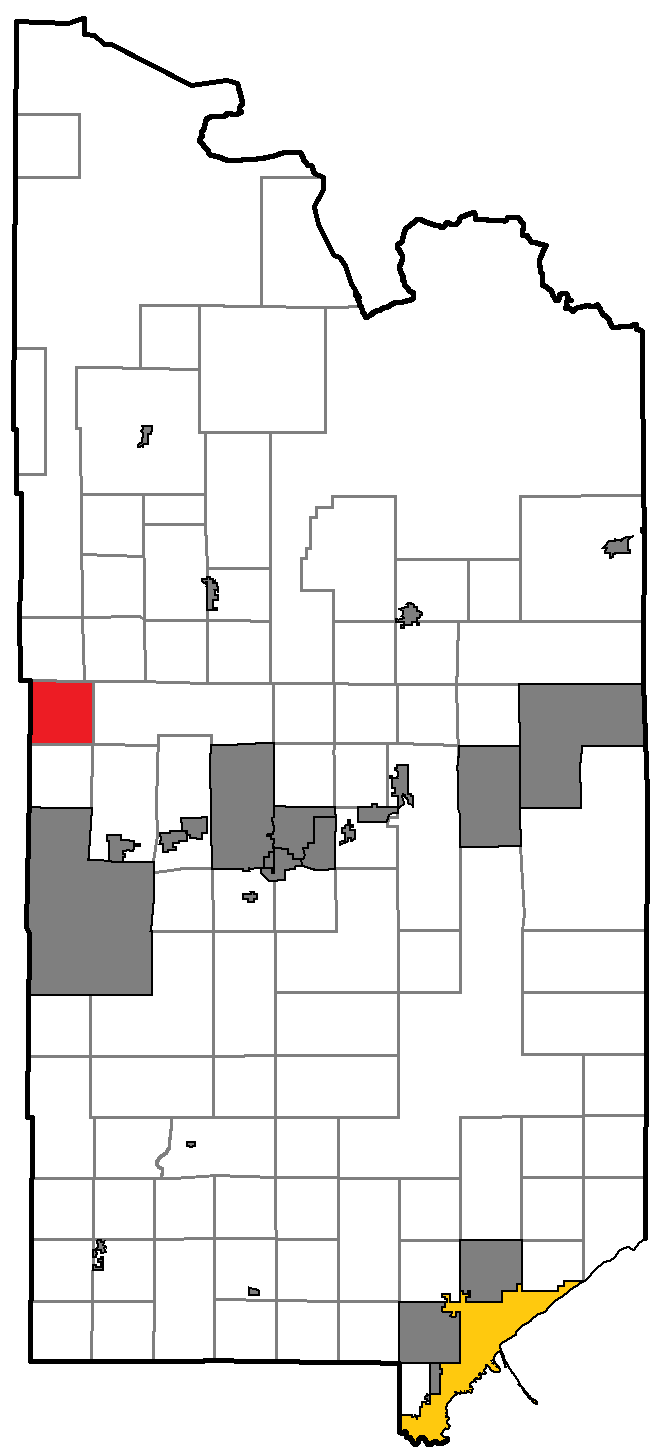
- Location of French Township within St. Louis County, Minnesota
- Coordinates: 47°39′55″N 93°1′25″W
- Country: United States
- State: Minnesota
- County: Saint Louis

Area
  - Total: 37.3 sq mi (96.7 km^{2})
  - Land: 33.2 sq mi (86.0 km^{2})
  - Water: 4.1 sq mi (10.7 km^{2})
- Elevation: 1,371 ft (418 m)

Population (2020)
  - Total: 552
  - Density: 16.6/sq mi (6.42/km^{2})
- Time zone: UTC-6 (Central (CST))
  - Summer (DST): UTC-5 (CDT)
- FIPS code: 27-22724
- GNIS feature ID: 0664230
- Website: https://www.frenchtwpmn.gov/

French Township is a township in Saint Louis County, Minnesota, United States. The population was 552 at the 2020 census.

Saint Louis County Highway 5 (CR 5) serves as a main route for the township.

The unincorporated community of Side Lake and McCarthy Beach State Park are located within French Township.

== History ==
French Township was named in honor of William A. French, a pioneer settler.

== Geography ==
According to the United States Census Bureau, the township has a total area of 37.3 square miles (97 km^{2}); 33.2 square miles (86 km^{2}) is land and 4.1 square miles (11 km^{2}), or 11.04%, is water.

The Shannon River and the Sturgeon River both flow through French Township. Sand Creek flows through the northern portion of the township.

Part of French Township is located within the Superior National Forest in Saint Louis County.

=== Adjacent townships and communities ===
The following are adjacent to French Township :

- Balkan Township (southeast)
- Dark River Unorganized Territory of Saint Louis County (east)
- Sturgeon Township (northeast)
- The unincorporated community of Sturgeon (northeast)
- Morcom Township (north)
- The unincorporated community of Bear River (north-northwest)
- Bearville Township of Itasca County (west and northwest)
- Northeast Itasca Unorganized Territory of Itasca County (southwest)
- McCormack Unorganized Territory of Saint Louis County (south)

=== Unincorporated communities ===
- Side Lake

== Demographics ==
At the 2000 census there were 354 people, 146 households, and 117 families living in the township. The population density was 10.7 people per square mile (4.1/km^{2}). There were 286 housing units at an average density of 8.6/sq mi (3.3/km^{2}). The racial makeup of the township was 99.72% White, and 0.28% from two or more races. Of the 146 households 25.3% had children under the age of 18 living with them, 74.0% were married couples living together, 3.4% had a female householder with no husband present, and 19.2% were non-families. 16.4% of households were one person and 6.2% were one person aged 65 or older. The average household size was 2.42 and the average family size was 2.66.

The age distribution was 19.2% under the age of 18, 4.8% from 18 to 24, 23.2% from 25 to 44, 34.2% from 45 to 64, and 18.6% 65 or older. The median age was 47 years. For every 100 females, there were 103.4 males. For every 100 females age 18 and over, there were 110.3 males.

The median household income was $49,583 and the median family income was $58,125. Males had a median income of $45,781 versus $35,625 for females. The per capita income for the township was $23,856. About 2.0% of families and 3.7% of the population were below the poverty line, including 11.4% of those under age 18 and 4.4% of those age 65 or over.
