= Field Township, St. Louis County, Minnesota =

Field Township, Minnesota
- Township
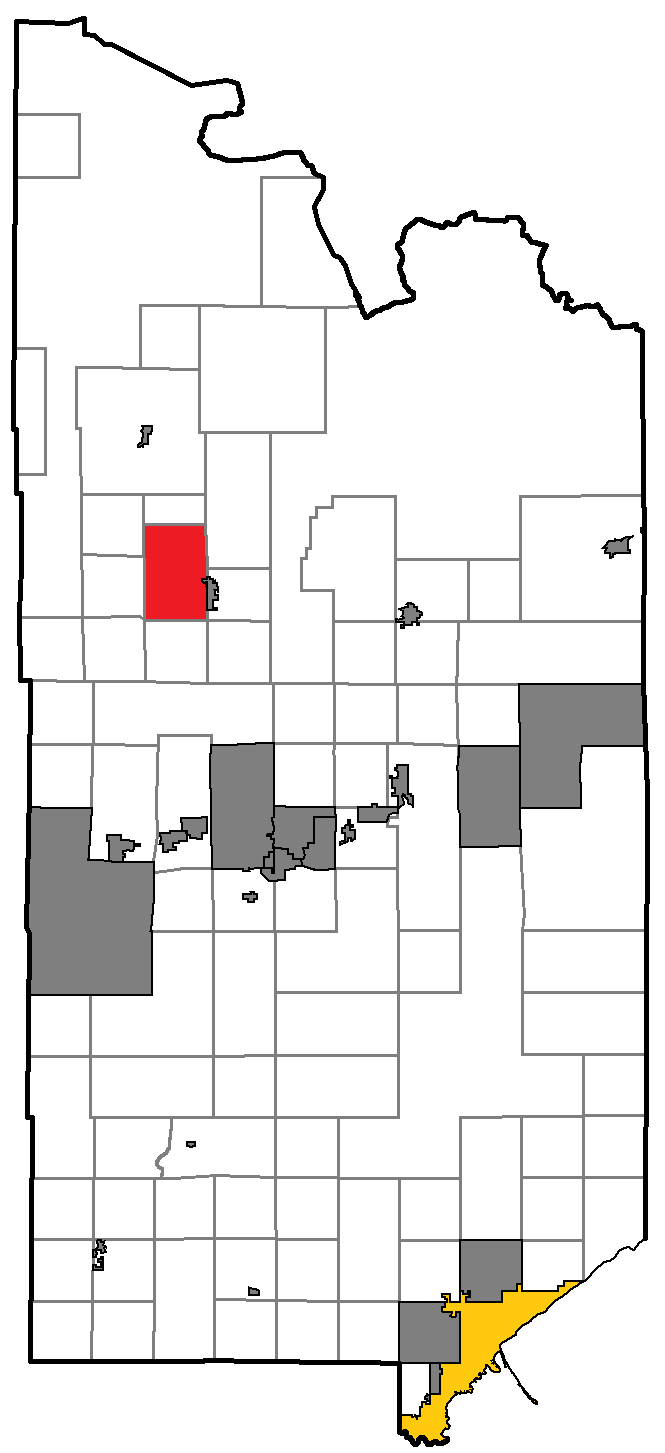
- Location of Field Township within St. Louis County, Minnesota
- Coordinates: 47°51′51″N 92°45′3″W
- Country: United States
- State: Minnesota
- County: Saint Louis

Area
  - Total: 54.2 sq mi (140.5 km^{2})
  - Land: 54.2 sq mi (140.5 km^{2})
  - Water: 0 sq mi (0.0 km^{2})
- Elevation: 1,306 ft (398 m)

Population (2020)
  - Total: 351
  - Density: 6.47/sq mi (2.50/km^{2})
- Time zone: UTC-6 (Central (CST))
  - Summer (DST): UTC-5 (CDT)
- FIPS code: 27-20996
- GNIS feature ID: 0664163
- Website: https://www.fieldtownship.com/

Field Township is a township in Saint Louis County, Minnesota, United States. The population was 351 at the 2020 census.

U.S. Highway 53 and State Highway 1 (MN 1) are two of the main routes in the township. Cook and Orr are both nearby.

Field Township was named for a local journalist.

== Geography ==
According to the United States Census Bureau, the township has a total area of 54.2 square miles (140 km^{2}), of which 0.02% is water.

The Little Fork River flows through the southern portion of Field Township.

The Rice River, a tributary of the Little Fork River, flows through the southeast part of the township.

Alango Creek flows through the southwest corner of the township. Flint Creek flows through the central portion of Field Township.

The North Branch of Flint Creek flows through the northeast part of the township.

The northern 1/3 portion of Field Township is located within the Kabetogama State Forest.

=== Adjacent townships, cities, and communities ===
The following are adjacent to Field Township :

- Owens Township (east)
- The city of Cook (east)
- Beatty Township (northeast)
- The unincorporated community of Wakemup (northeast)
- Gheen Unorganized Territory (north)
- The unincorporated community of Gheen Corner (north)
- The unincorporated community of Gheen (north)
- The city of Orr (north)
- Willow Valley Township (northwest)
- Linden Grove Township (west)
- The unincorporated community of Linden Grove (west)
- Sturgeon Township (southwest)
- The unincorporated community of Sturgeon (southwest)
- Alango Township (south)
- Angora Township (southeast)
- The unincorporated community of Angora (southeast)
- The unincorporated community of Sherman Corner (southeast)

Leander Road runs east–west along Field Township's southern boundary line with adjacent Alango Township.

Ralph Road runs north–south along Field Township's eastern boundary line with both adjacent Owens Township and the city of Cook.

Carpenter Road runs north–south along Field Township's western boundary line with both adjacent Willow Valley Township and Linden Grove Township.

== Demographics ==
As of the census of 2000, there were 391 people, 171 households, and 115 families residing in the township. The population density was 7.2 inhabitants per square mile (2.8/km^{2}). There were 212 housing units at an average density of 3.9 per square mile (1.5/km^{2}). The racial makeup of the township was 96.68% White, 2.05% Native American, 1.28% from other races. Hispanic or Latino of any race were 1.53% of the population.

There were 171 households, out of which 30.4% had children under the age of 18 living with them, 58.5% were married couples living together, 4.7% had a female householder with no husband present, and 32.2% were non-families. 29.2% of all households were made up of individuals, and 6.4% had someone living alone who was 65 years of age or older. The average household size was 2.29 and the average family size was 2.77.

In the township the population was spread out, with 23.3% under the age of 18, 4.3% from 18 to 24, 28.9% from 25 to 44, 31.5% from 45 to 64, and 12.0% who were 65 years of age or older. The median age was 42 years. For every 100 females, there were 116.0 males. For every 100 females age 18 and over, there were 104.1 males.

The median income for a household in the township was $45,333, and the median income for a family was $48,750. Males had a median income of $41,625 versus $31,250 for females. The per capita income for the township was $21,995. About 10.0% of families and 12.4% of the population were below the poverty line, including 15.6% of those under age 18 and 19.6% of those age 65 or over.

== Media ==
The official newspaper of Field Township is the Timberjay. The Timberjay is published weekly, with a circulation of over 1000.
