= Bear River, Minnesota =

Unincorporated community in Minnesota, United States

Bear River
- Unincorporated community
- Location within Minnesota Location within the United States
- Coordinates: 47°46′40″N 93°04′59″W
- Country: United States
- State: Minnesota
- County: Itasca and Saint Louis
- Township: Bearville Township and Morcom Township
- Elevation: 1,283 ft (391 m)

Population
  - Total: 10
- Time zone: UTC-6 (Central (CST))
  - Summer (DST): UTC-5 (CDT)
- ZIP code: 55723
- Area code: 218
- GNIS feature ID: 660745

Bear River is an unincorporated community in Itasca and Saint Louis counties in the U.S. state of Minnesota.

Bear River is at the intersection of County Road 22 and County Road 916 (Saint Louis–Itasca Judicial Road), 24 miles west of Cook and 31 miles east of Effie. It is partly in Morcom Township in Saint Louis County, and partly in Bearville Township in Itasca County.

The Bear River, a tributary of the Sturgeon River, flows through the community.

Saint Louis County Highway 5 and Minnesota State Highway 65 are both nearby, as are the communities of Togo, Celina, and Side Lake.

Bear River is the home town of the Minnesota Twins mascot TC Bear.
