= Cusson, Minnesota =

Cusson
- Unincorporated community
- Location within Minnesota Location within the United States
- Coordinates: 48°06′07″N 92°50′35″W
- Country: United States
- State: Minnesota
- County: Saint Louis
- Township: Leiding Township
- Elevation: 1,332 ft (406 m)

Population
  - Total: 40
- Time zone: UTC-6 (Central (CST))
  - Summer (DST): UTC-5 (CDT)
- ZIP code: 55771
- Area code: 218
- GNIS feature ID: 661082

Cusson is an unincorporated community in Leiding Township, Saint Louis County, Minnesota, United States; located in the Arrowhead Region of Minnesota.

== Geography ==
The community is immediately north of Orr on U.S. Highway 53 and 21 miles north of Cook. Cusson is within the Kabetogama State Forest.

== History ==
A post office called Cusson was established in 1909, and remained in operation until 1929. Cusson was a station on the Duluth, Winnipeg and Pacific Railway.
