= Flint Creek =

Flint Creek may refer to:

== Watercourses ==
- Flint Creek (Alabama)
- Flint Creek (Arkansas/Oklahoma)
- Flint Creek (New York)

== Towns ==
- Flint Creek, Oklahoma

== Other uses ==
- Flint Creek Range, mountain range in Montana
- Flint Creek Water Park, a waterpark in Mississippi
- Flint Creek Farm, a historic farm in Minnesota
