= Bearville =

Bearville may refer to:

- Bearville, Kentucky
- Bearville Township, Itasca County, Minnesota

== See also ==
- Bearsville (disambiguation)
