= Balkan Township, St. Louis County, Minnesota =

Balkan Township, Minnesota
- Township
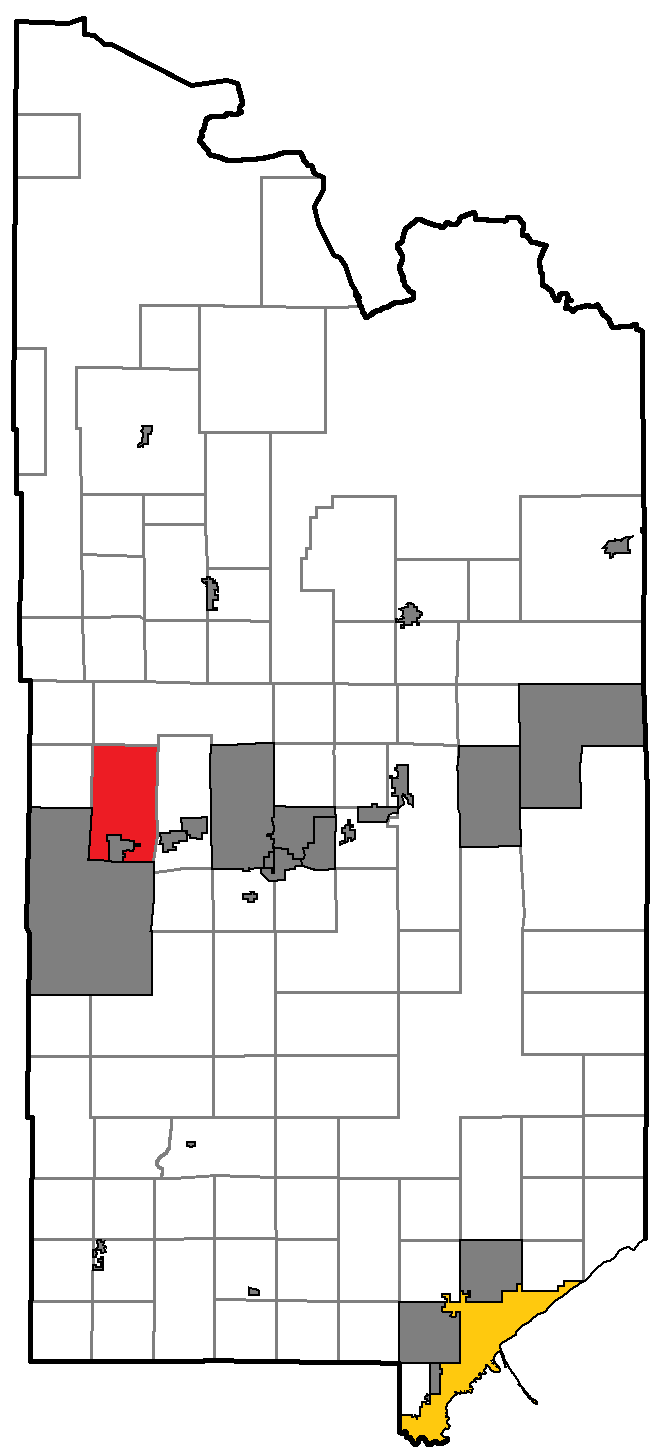
- Location of Balkan Township within St. Louis County, Minnesota
- Coordinates: 47°30′35″N 92°52′35″W
- Country: United States
- State: Minnesota
- County: Saint Louis

Area
  - Total: 65.3 sq mi (169.0 km^{2})
  - Land: 64.2 sq mi (166.3 km^{2})
  - Water: 1.0 sq mi (2.7 km^{2})
- Elevation: 1,499 ft (457 m)

Population (2020)
  - Total: 808
  - Density: 12.6/sq mi (4.86/km^{2})
- Time zone: UTC-6 (Central (CST))
  - Summer (DST): UTC-5 (CDT)
- FIPS code: 27-03322
- GNIS feature ID: 0663497
- Website: https://balkantownshipmn.gov/

Balkan Township is a township in Saint Louis County, Minnesota, United States. The township was named after the Balkan Mountains. The population was 808 at the 2020 census.

U.S. Highway 169 and State Highway 73 (MN 73) are two of the main routes in the township.

The city of Chisholm is located within the south–central portion of Balkan Township geographically but is a separate entity.

== Geography ==
According to the United States Census Bureau, the township has a total area of 65.3 square miles (169 km^{2}); 64.2 square miles (166 km^{2}) is land and 1.1 square miles (2.8 km^{2}), or 1.62%, is water.

The Shannon River flows through the west–central edge of Balkan Township. Boriin Creek flows through the north–central portion of the township. The East Branch of the Sturgeon River flows through the northeast portion of the township. Slow Creek flows through the east–central part of Balkan Township.

=== Adjacent townships and cities ===
The following are adjacent to Balkan Township :

- The city of Chisholm
- The city of Hibbing (west and south)
- Cherry Township (southeast)
- Great Scott Township (east)
- The city of Buhl (east)
- The city of Kinney (east)
- Dark River Unorganized Territory (north)
- French Township (northwest)
- McCormack Unorganized Territory (west)

Highway 73 runs north–south through the middle of Balkan Township, north of Chisholm.

Highway 169 runs east–west through the southeast portion of the township near Buhl.

Saint Louis County Highway 5 (CR 5) passes through the southwest corner of Balkan Township near Hibbing. Highway 5 also briefly enters the southeast corner of Balkan Township on a separate segment of Highway 5 near Maturi Road.

Maturi Road runs east–west along Balkan Township's southern boundary line with adjacent city of Hibbing in the southeast corner of Balkan Township.

Cemetery Road (Sever Road) runs east–west along Balkan Township's boundary line with adjacent city of Chisholm at the northern city limits of Chisholm.

Barrett Road runs north–south along Balkan Township's eastern boundary line with adjacent Great Scott Township in the northeast corner of Balkan Township.

North Long Lake Road briefly runs north–south along Balkan Township's western boundary line in the northwest part of the township.

McNiven Road travels through the east–central part of Balkan Township. Hobson Lake Road (County 84 / Hwy.84) travels through the west–central part of the township.

== Demographics ==
As of the census of 2000, there were 811 people, 329 households, and 243 families residing in the township. The population density was 12.6 inhabitants per square mile (4.9/km^{2}). There were 359 housing units at an average density of 5.6 per square mile (2.2/km^{2}). The racial makeup of the township was 97.29% White, 0.49% Native American, 0.49% Asian, 0.62% from other races, and 1.11% from two or more races. Hispanic or Latino of any race were 0.25% of the population.

There were 329 households, out of which 29.2% had children under the age of 18 living with them, 65.3% were married couples living together, 5.2% had a female householder with no husband present, and 26.1% were non-families. 22.8% of all households were made up of individuals, and 8.8% had someone living alone who was 65 years of age or older. The average household size was 2.47 and the average family size was 2.90.

In the township the population was spread out, with 22.4% under the age of 18, 4.7% from 18 to 24, 27.1% from 25 to 44, 34.0% from 45 to 64, and 11.7% who were 65 years of age or older. The median age was 43 years. For every 100 females, there were 103.8 males. For every 100 females age 18 and over, there were 102.3 males.

The median income for a household in the township was $44,853, and the median income for a family was $52,768. Males had a median income of $42,426 versus $21,786 for females. The per capita income for the township was $21,570. About 2.0% of families and 4.3% of the population were below the poverty line, including 4.2% of those under age 18 and 8.8% of those age 65 or over.
