= Bearsville =

Bearsville may refer to:

- Bearsville, New York, a hamlet in Ulster County, New York
- Bearsville Records, an American record label active from 1970 to 1984
- Bearsville Studios, a recording studio in Bearsville, New York

== See also ==
- Bearville (disambiguation)
