= Wakemup, Minnesota =

Wakemup
- Unincorporated community
- Location within Minnesota Location within the United States
- Coordinates: 47°55′27″N 92°38′43″W
- Country: United States
- State: Minnesota
- County: Saint Louis
- Township: Beatty Township
- Elevation: 1,371 ft (418 m)

Population
  - Total: 130
- Time zone: UTC-6 (Central (CST))
  - Summer (DST): UTC-5 (CDT)
- Area code: 218
- GNIS feature ID: 662731

Wakemup is an unincorporated community in Beatty Township, Saint Louis County, Minnesota, United States.

The community is located six miles north of Cook, near Saint Louis County Road 24 (Vermilion Drive).

Wakemup is located within the Kabetogama State Forest.
