= Vermilion Dam, Minnesota =

Vermilion Dam
- Unincorporated community
- Location within Minnesota Location within the United States
- Coordinates: 47°57′40″N 92°28′34″W
- Country: United States
- State: Minnesota
- County: Saint Louis
- Elevation: 1,358 ft (414 m)

Population
  - Total: 20
- Time zone: UTC-6 (Central (CST))
  - Summer (DST): UTC-5 (CDT)
- ZIP code: 55771
- Area code: 218
- GNIS feature ID: 662712

Vermilion Dam is an unincorporated community in Saint Louis County, Minnesota, United States.

The community is located 21 miles northeast of Cook, near the junction of Saint Louis County Road 24 and County Road 422.

Vermilion Dam is located within the Kabetogama State Forest.
