= Flint Creek Farm =

Historic farm in Field Township, Minnesota

- Flint Creek Farm Historic District
- U.S. National Register of Historic Places
- U.S. Historic district
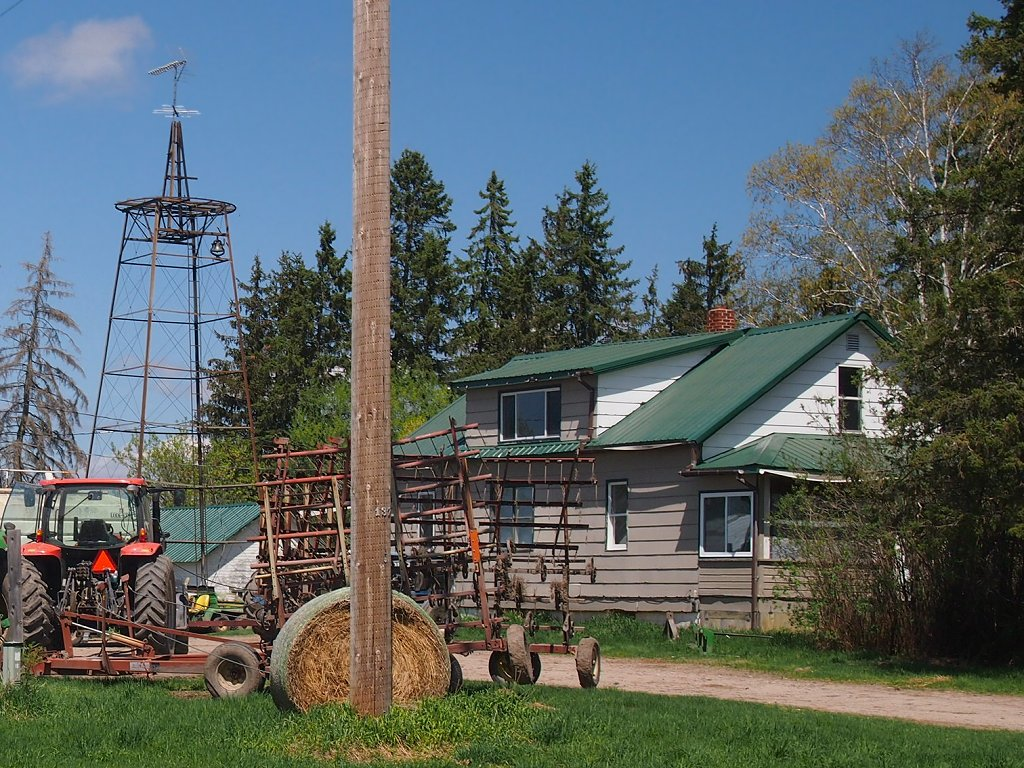
- Part of the Flint Creek Farm

- Location within Minnesota Location within the United States
- Location: State Highway 1, Field Township, Minnesota
- Coordinates: 47°51′45″N 92°48′36″W
- Area: 1.3 acres (0.53 ha)
- Built: c. 1910–1915
- NRHP reference No.: 89000139
- Added to NRHP: March 2, 1989

The Flint Creek Farm is a historic farm in Field Township, Minnesota, United States. From 1915 to 1933 the farm was owned by executives of the area's largest lumber company as a side venture supplying food and hay to the company's lumber camps. Three buildings and a windmill tower are still standing from this period.

== Background ==
The property was listed on the National Register of Historic Places in 1989 as the Flint Creek Farm Historic District for its local significance in the themes of agriculture and industry. It was nominated as one of only two known surviving Minnesota farms established to supply a major lumber company (the other being the Ann River Logging Company Farm in Kanabec County). It was also nominated for its associations with its two owners, influential Virginia and Rainy Lake Lumber Company executives Samuel J. Cusson (c. 1862–1919) and Chester H. Rogers (1866–1933).

== See also ==
- National Register of Historic Places listings in St. Louis County, Minnesota
