= Kettle River, Minnesota =

City in Minnesota, United States

Kettle River
- City
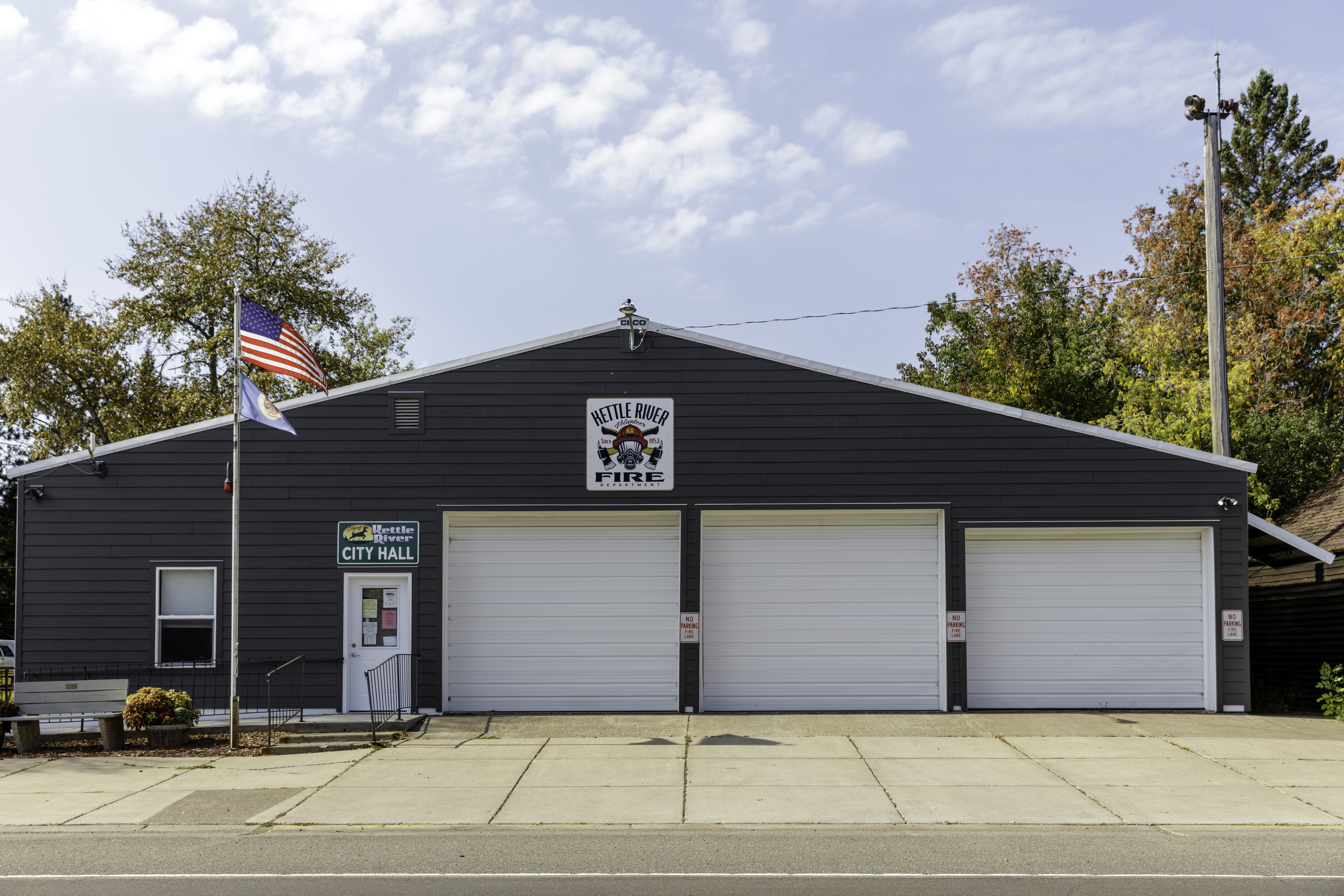
- Kettle River City Hall and Fire Department

- Location of the city of Kettle River within Carlton County, Minnesota
- Coordinates: 46°29′14″N 92°52′38″W
- Country: United States
- State: Minnesota
- County: Carlton

Area
  - Total: 0.39 sq mi (1.00 km^{2})
  - Land: 0.39 sq mi (1.00 km^{2})
  - Water: 0 sq mi (0.00 km^{2})
- Elevation: 1,180 ft (360 m)

Population (2020)
  - Total: 166
  - Density: 429.5/sq mi (165.84/km^{2})
- Time zone: UTC-6 (Central (CST))
  - Summer (DST): UTC-5 (CDT)
- ZIP code: 55757
- Area code: 218
- FIPS code: 27-32966
- GNIS feature ID: 0646127
- Website: https://www.ci.kettle-river.mn.us/

Kettle River is a city in Carlton County, Minnesota, along the Kettle River, for which it was named. As of the 2020 census, Kettle River had a population of 166. It was incorporated in 1921.

Minnesota State Highway 73 serves as a main route in Kettle River.

== Geography ==
According to the United States Census Bureau, the city has a total area of 0.38 square miles (0.98 km^{2}), all land.

Kettle River is located seven miles west-northwest of Moose Lake. Kettle River is located 30 miles southwest of Cloquet.

== History ==
The Kettle River area of Carlton County, Minnesota, was settled by a large concentration of Finnish Immigrants in the years leading up to the First World War and the influence of those immigrants is still noticeable even today.

On October 12, 1918, the Cloquet fire, caused by sparks on the local railroads, left much of western Carlton County area devastated. Several hundred persons were killed by the fire and thousands more left homeless. The only building left standing in Kettle River following the fire was the bank that was made of brick. This building still stands in Kettle River, near the center of the town on the west side of State Highway 73.

Following the fire, with most people homeless and destitute, the Spanish flu outbreak of 1918 caused more damage to the community.

Every August, the town hosts Ma and Pa Kettle Days, an annual festival; that includes a pancake breakfast, parade, pageant, Mud Bog and street dances.

== Demographics ==
Historical population
Census	Pop.	Note	%±
1930	169		—
1940	221		30.8%
1950	223		0.9%
1960	234		4.9%
1970	173		−26.1%
1980	174		0.6%
1990	190		9.2%
2000	168		−11.6%
2010	180		7.1%
2020	166		−7.8%
U.S. Decennial Census

=== 2010 census ===
As of the census of 2010, there were 180 people, 79 households, and 52 families living in the city. The population density was 473.7 inhabitants per square mile (182.9/km^{2}). There were 96 housing units at an average density of 252.6 per square mile (97.5/km^{2}). The racial makeup of the city was 92.2% White, 1.7% Native American, and 6.1% from two or more races. Hispanic or Latino of any race were 0.6% of the population.

There were 79 households, of which 34.2% had children under the age of 18 living with them, 41.8% were married couples living together, 16.5% had a female householder with no husband present, 7.6% had a male householder with no wife present, and 34.2% were non-families. 29.1% of all households were made up of individuals, and 8.8% had someone living alone who was 65 years of age or older. The average household size was 2.28 and the average family size was 2.81.

The median age in the city was 41 years. 24.4% of residents were under the age of 18; 2.9% were between the ages of 18 and 24; 29.4% were from 25 to 44; 25% were from 45 to 64; and 18.3% were 65 years of age or older. The gender makeup of the city was 48.9% male and 51.1% female.

=== 2000 census ===
As of the census of 2000, there were 168 people, 75 households, and 44 families living in the city. The population density was 436.4 inhabitants per square mile (168.5/km^{2}). There were 88 housing units at an average density of 228.6 per square mile (88.3/km^{2}). The racial makeup of the city was 97.02% White, 0.60% Native American, and 2.38% from two or more races. 36.8% were of Finnish, 25.2% German, 9.7% Norwegian and 6.5% Swedish ancestry according to Census 2000.

There were 75 households, out of which 32.0% had children under the age of 18 living with them, 42.7% were married couples living together, 9.3% had a female householder with no husband present, and 41.3% were non-families. 34.7% of all households were made up of individuals, and 22.7% had someone living alone who was 65 years of age or older. The average household size was 2.24 and the average family size was 2.82.

In the city, the population was spread out, with 26.2% under the age of 18, 5.4% from 18 to 24, 28.0% from 25 to 44, 20.2% from 45 to 64, and 20.2% who were 65 years of age or older. The median age was 41 years. For every 100 females, there were 102.4 males. For every 100 females age 18 and over, there were 100.0 males.

The median income for a household in the city was $24,750, and the median income for a family was $31,250. Males had a median income of $32,188 versus $18,542 for females. The per capita income for the city was $15,620. None of the families and 7.9% of the population were living below the poverty line, including no under eighteens and 21.4% of those over 64.

== Gallery ==
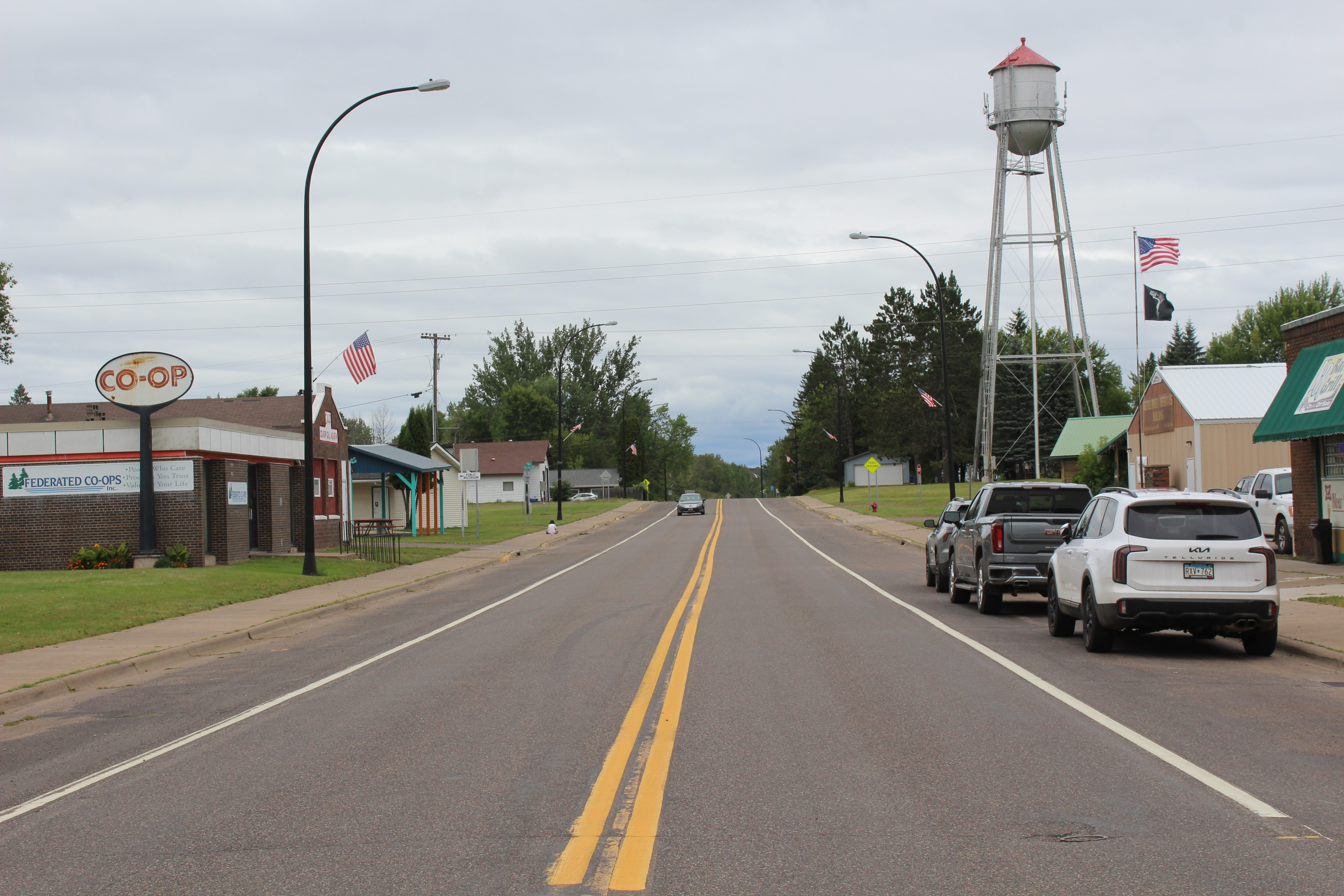
Main Street looking north

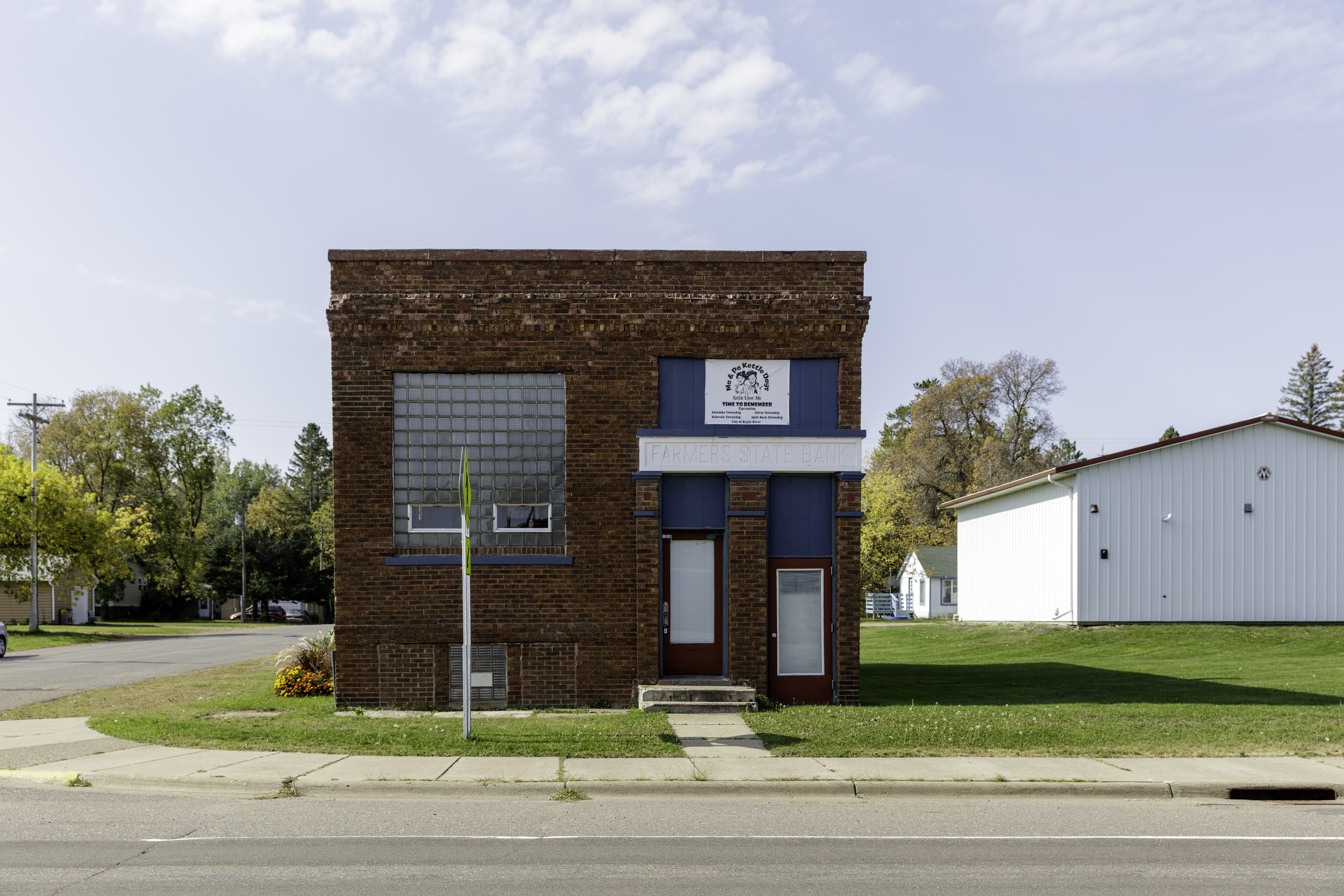
Farmer's State Bank building

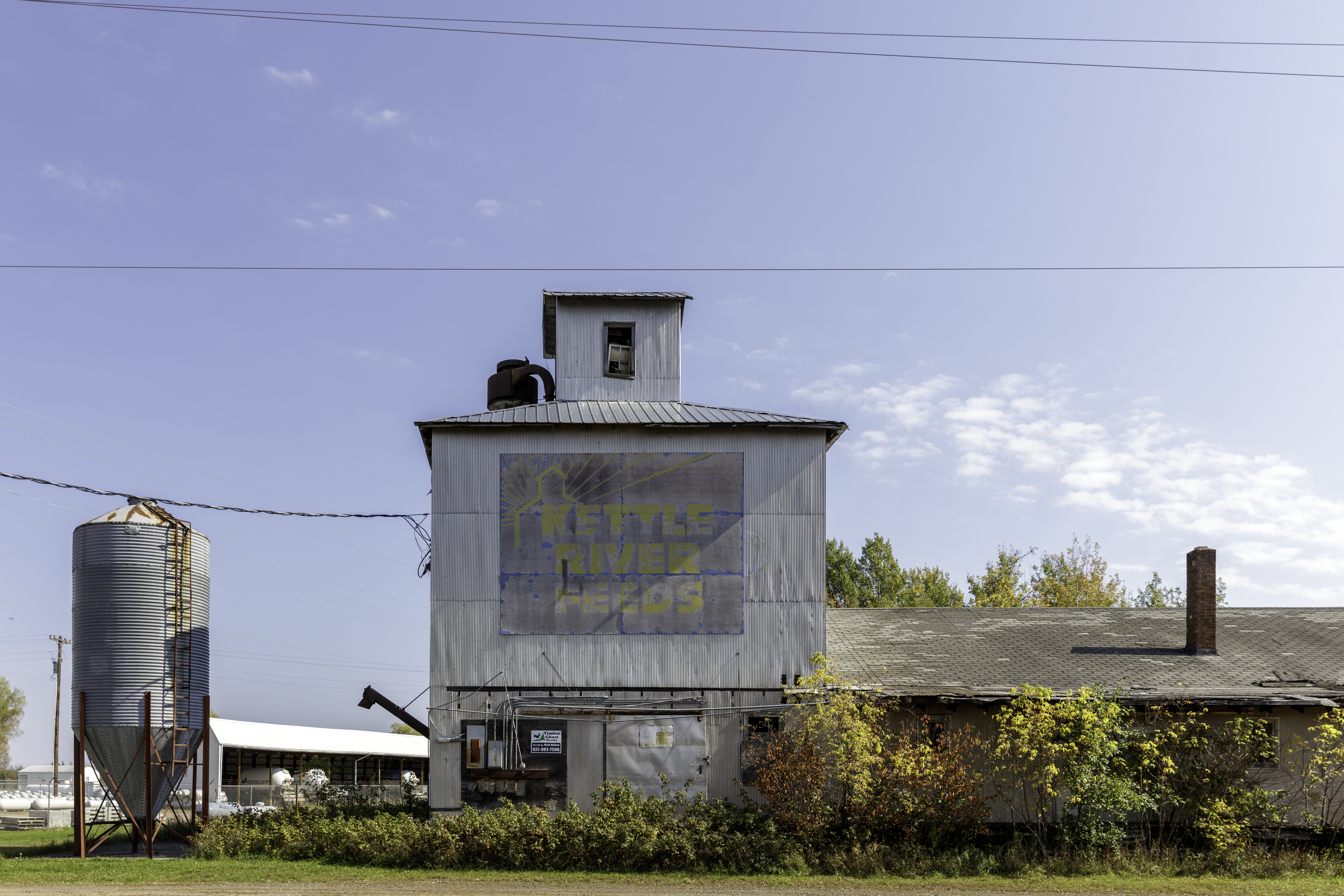
Kettle River Feeds building

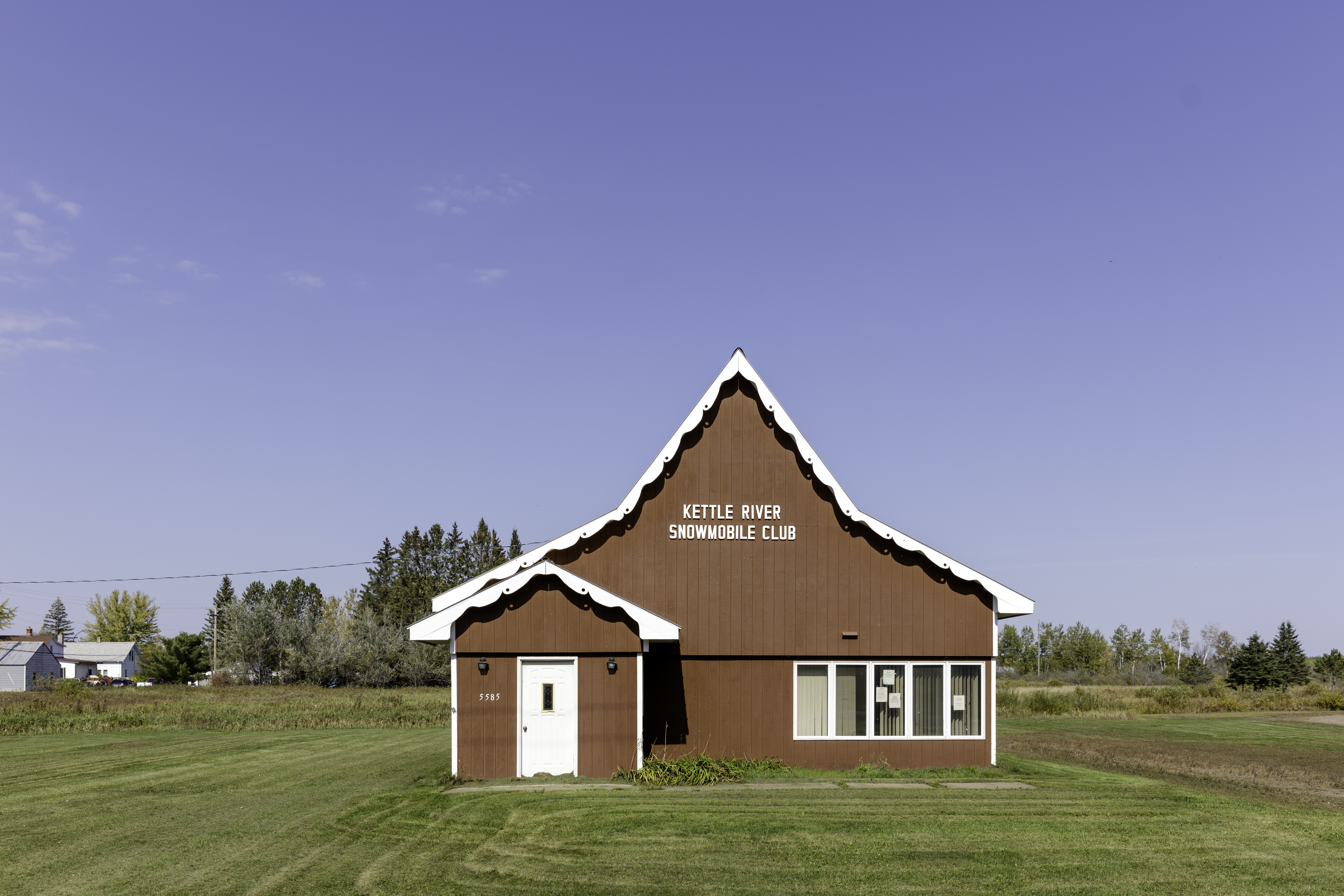
Kettle River Snowmobile Club

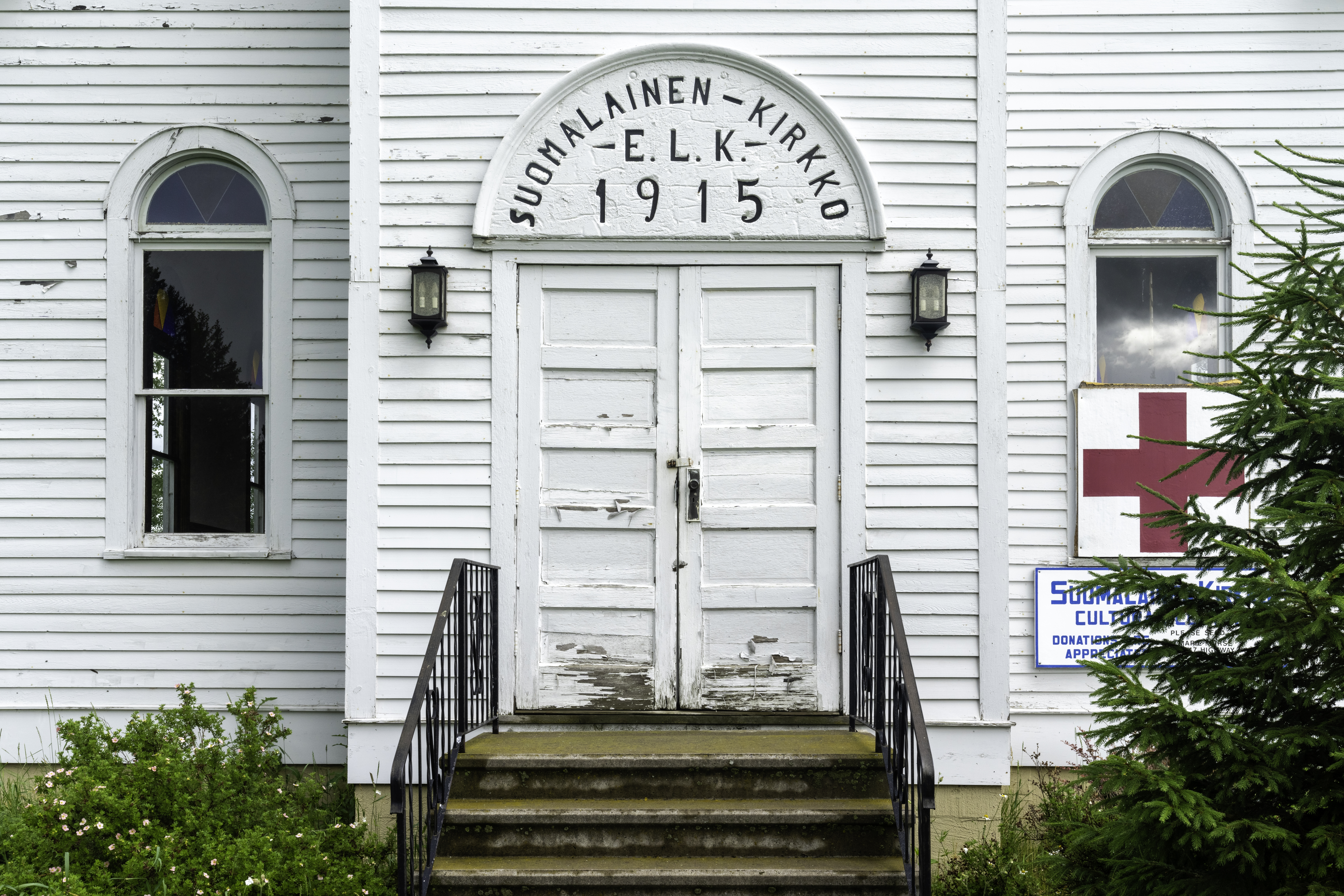
Suomalainen Kirkko (Finnish Church), former church and hospital
