= Glendale, St. Louis County, Minnesota =

Glendale
- Unincorporated community
- Location within Minnesota Location within the United States
- Coordinates: 48°01′57″N 92°49′52″W
- Country: United States
- State: Minnesota
- County: Saint Louis
- Township: Leiding Township
- Elevation: 1,299 ft (396 m)

Population
  - Total: 10
- Time zone: UTC-6 (Central (CST))
  - Summer (DST): UTC-5 (CDT)
- ZIP code: 55771
- Area code: 218
- GNIS feature ID: 661363

Glendale is an unincorporated community in Leiding Township, Saint Louis County, Minnesota, United States.

The community is located immediately south of Orr at the junction of U.S. Highway 53 and Saint Louis County Road 23 (Nett Lake Road).

Glendale is located within the Kabetogama State Forest.
