= McCormack, Minnesota =

Unorganized territory in St. Louis County, Minnesota, United States

Coordinates: 47°35′03″N 93°00′10″W

- Unorganized territory
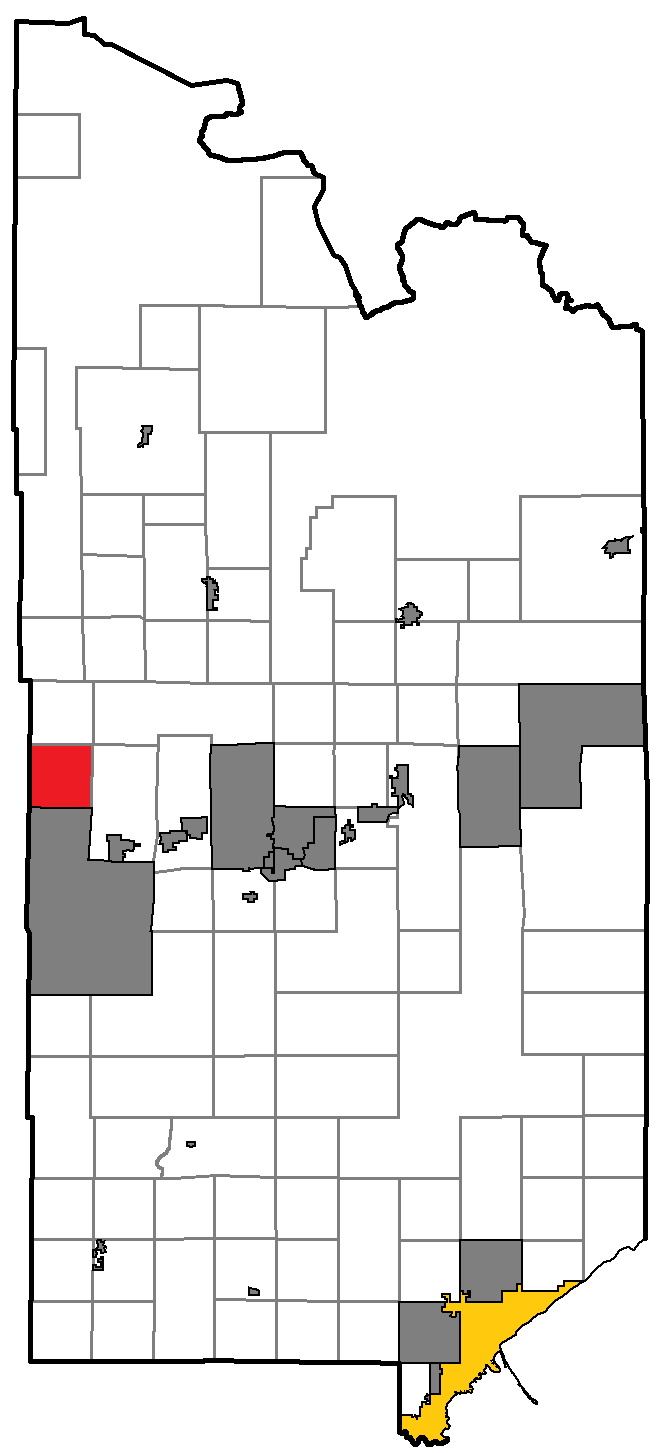
- Location of McCormack within St. Louis County, Minnesota
- Country: United States
- State: Minnesota
- County: St. Louis

Area
  - Total: 37.25 sq mi (96.5 km^{2})
  - Land: 35.66 sq mi (92.4 km^{2})
  - Water: 1.59 sq mi (4.1 km^{2})

Population (2020)
  - Total: 208
  - Density: 5.83/sq mi (2.25/km^{2})
- Time zone: UTC-6 (Central (CST))
  - Summer (DST): UTC-5 (CDT)
- Area code: 218

McCormack is an unorganized territory in Saint Louis County, Minnesota, United States, located near Hibbing and Balkan Township. The population was 208 at the 2020 census.

== Geography ==
According to the United States Census Bureau, the unorganized territory has a total area of 37.0 square miles (95.7 km^{2}), of which 35.3 square miles (91.4 km^{2}) is land and 1.7 square miles (4.3 km^{2}) (4.49%) is water.

== Demographics ==
At the 2000 United States census there were 237 people, 89 households, and 75 families living in the unorganized territory. The population density was 6.7 inhabitants per square mile (2.6/km^{2}). There were 128 housing units at an average density of 3.6 per square mile (1.4/km^{2}). The racial makeup of the unorganized territory was 99.16% White, and 0.84% from two or more races. Of the 89 households 39.3% had children under the age of 18 living with them, 74.2% were married couples living together, 6.7% had a female householder with no husband present, and 15.7% were non-families. 13.5% of households were one person and 7.9% were one person aged 65 or older. The average household size was 2.66 and the average family size was 2.92.

The age distribution was 25.7% under the age of 18, 5.9% from 18 to 24, 28.7% from 25 to 44, 29.5% from 45 to 64, and 10.1% 65 or older. The median age was 41 years. For every 100 females, there were 104.3 males. For every 100 females age 18 and over, there were 102.3 males.

The median household income was $45,250 and the median family income was $50,417. Males had a median income of $37,083 versus $20,682 for females. The per capita income for the unorganized territory was $20,121. None of the families and 6.2% of the population were living below the poverty line.
