= Swan River Logging Company =

The Swan River Logging Company was established in 1892 along the confluence of the Swan and Mississippi Rivers near Jacobson, Minnesota.

A landing had been in use for many years, taking travelers to farmsteads and towns all along the way. The steamboats used cord wood to fuel the vessels. Seeing an opportunity, Ammi W. Wright and Charles Davis, loggers by trade, thought the location would be ideal for a logging base camp and railroad terminus. It was determined piers could be built, and logs dumped into the Mississippi River. The logs would then drift to the sawmills lower on the river. Though most of the timber near the river had already been cut by 1890, the two solved the problem by constructing a railroad up into the high elevation timberlands of the Gardner and Hibbing areas. Spurs went out to various stands of timber. The logs were sent down to Mississippi Landing and dumped off the cars into the river. During the season they were able to haul about 500,000 feet per day." (Hibbing Sentinel ~ May 21, 1898)

The Company's base camp at the Mississippi Landing became a village. A machine and repair shop and an eight stall engine house were built. It was a company town, equipped with a company office, general manager's house, ice house, boarding house, railroad boarding house, turntable, roundhouse, machine shop, car shop, casting house, harness room, cattle barn, hog pen, sawmill, warehouses, coal bins, roothouse, store, school house, coal dock, pumping house, water tank, boathouse, sand house, and several cottages.

Supplies and materials for the construction of the camp were brought from Duluth on the Duluth & Winnipeg Railroad to Swan River, then down the Wright and Davis Railroad to Mississippi Landing. Some materials and equipment came by riverboat. The railroad was built with all the modern equipment, including telegraph lines connecting the various stops.

Logging took place in the winter, and the logging horses were brought down to the landing and kept there during the summer months. Some were badly crippled from the rough winter work and were destroyed. A horse graveyard was established near the junction of Highways 65 and 200.

Accidents while logging were common and at times fatal. Many were buried in a cemetery set up north of the landing. The Swan River Logging Company built a board fence around the cemetery.

The company discouraged any other towns in the area. It owned the land around the terminus and would not sell lots to any person for any purpose whatever. They even put a fences around the town far out in the countryside, effectively prohibiting any other town from the railroad and steamboat landings. People living outside of the town had to go down the Mississippi River a distance of two miles to connect with a steamboat.

In 1908, the Great Northern Railway leased the tracks to the Mississippi, Hill City and Western Railway.

== External sources ==
- The Town Of Jacobson, Minnesota
