= Bearville Township, Itasca County, Minnesota =

Bearville Township, Minnesota
- Township
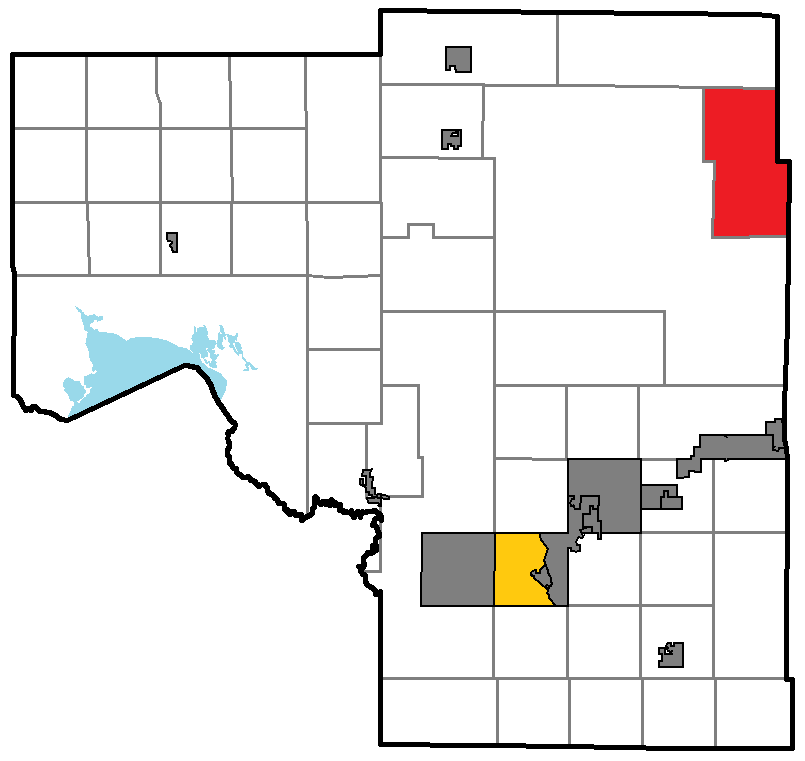
- Location of Bearville Township, within Itasca County, Minnesota
- Coordinates: 47°42′24″N 93°5′17″W
- Country: United States
- State: Minnesota
- County: Itasca

Area
  - Total: 72.9 sq mi (188.9 km^{2})
  - Land: 71.8 sq mi (186.0 km^{2})
  - Water: 1.1 sq mi (2.9 km^{2})
- Elevation: 1,414 ft (431 m)

Population (2020)
  - Total: 202
  - Density: 2.81/sq mi (1.09/km^{2})
- Time zone: UTC-6 (Central (CST))
  - Summer (DST): UTC-5 (CDT)
- FIPS code: 27-04276
- GNIS feature ID: 0663532
- Website: https://bearvilletownship.com/

Bearville Township is a township in Itasca County, Minnesota, United States. The population was 202 at the 2020 census.

State Highway 65 (MN 65) serves as a main route in the township.

== Geography ==
According to the United States Census Bureau, the township has a total area of 72.9 square miles (189 km^{2}), of which 71.8 square miles (186 km^{2}) is land and 1.1 square miles (2.8 km^{2}), or 1.55%, is water.

The unincorporated community of Bear River is located within Bearville Township.

The Bear River, a tributary of the Sturgeon River, flows through the township.

The unincorporated community of Togo also extends into the northern portion of Bearville Township.

== Demographics ==
At the 2000 census, there were 202 people, 93 households and 62 families living in the township. The population density was 2.8 per square mile (1.1/km^{2}). There were 232 housing units at an average density of 3.2/sq mi (1.2/km^{2}). The racial makeup of the township was 97.52% White, 1.49% Native American, 0.50% Pacific Islander, and 0.50% from two or more races.

There were 93 households, of which 15.1% had children under the age of 18 living with them, 62.4% were married couples living together, 3.2% had a female householder with no husband present, and 32.3% were non-families. 28.0% of all households were made up of individuals, and 6.5% had someone living alone who was 65 years of age or older. The average household size was 2.17 and the average family size was 2.51.

Age distribution was 15.8% under the age of 18, 5.0% from 18 to 24, 13.9% from 25 to 44, 47.5% from 45 to 64, and 17.8% who were 65 years of age or older. The median age was 50 years. For every 100 females, there were 102.0 males. For every 100 females age 18 and over, there were 107.3 males.

The median household income was $43,958, and the median family incomewas $49,375. Males had a median income of $45,938 versus $30,000 for females. The per capita income for the township was $28,563. About 3.5% of families and 7.8% of the population were below the poverty line, including 50.0% of those under the age of eighteen and none of those 65 or over.
