= Gheen, Minnesota =

Unorganized territory of St. Louis County, Minnesota, United States

Coordinates: 47°58′05″N 92°48′30″W

- Unorganized territory
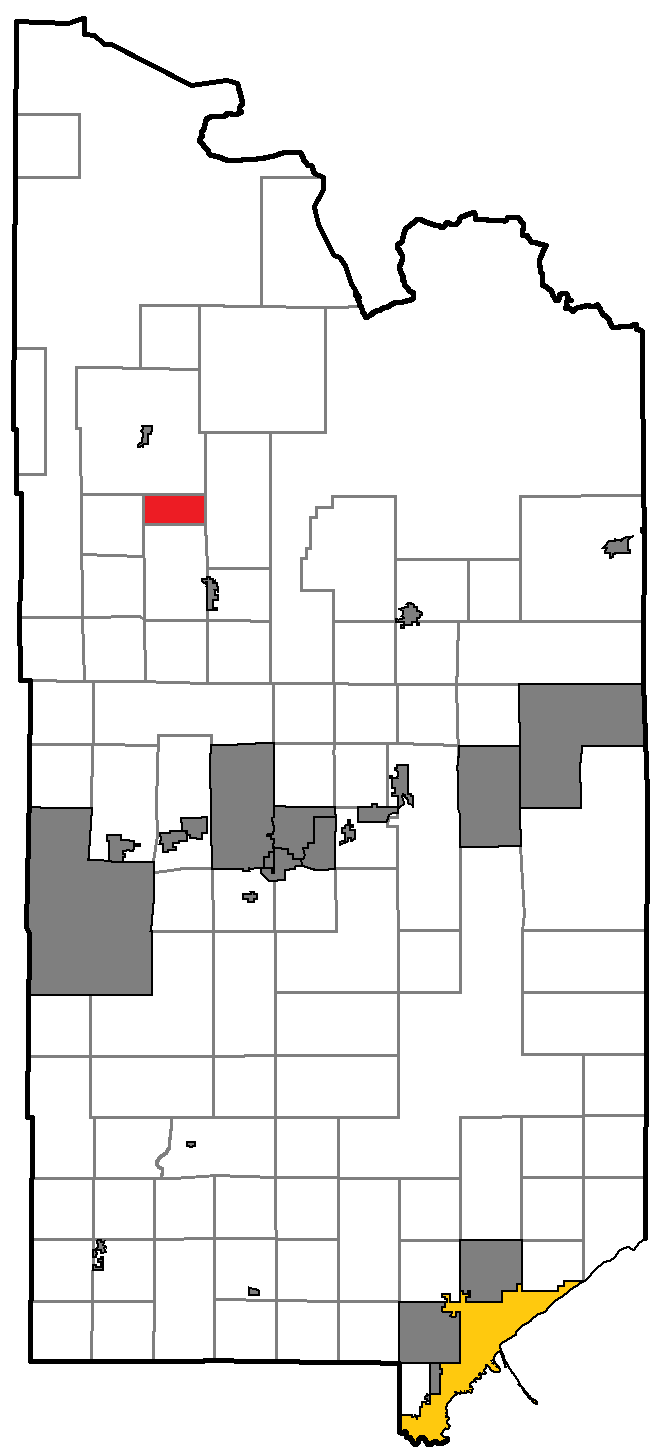
- Location of Gheen within St. Louis County, Minnesota
- Country: United States
- State: Minnesota
- County: St. Louis

Area
  - Total: 18.01 sq mi (46.6 km^{2})
  - Land: 17.71 sq mi (45.9 km^{2})
  - Water: 0.3 sq mi (0.78 km^{2})

Population (2020)
  - Total: 23
  - Density: 1.3/sq mi (0.50/km^{2})
- Time zone: UTC-6 (Central (CST))
  - Summer (DST): UTC-5 (CDT)
- Area code: 218

Gheen (/ɡiːn/ GHEEN) is an unorganized territory in Saint Louis County, Minnesota, United States. The population was 23 at the 2020 census.

Gheen Territory is in the Kabetogama State Forest. The unincorporated community of Gheen is in Gheen Territory.

The unincorporated community of Gheen Corner is located along the boundary line between Willow Valley Township and Gheen Territory.

U.S. Route 53 is in the vicinity. Cook and Orr are both nearby.

== Geography ==
According to the United States Census Bureau, the unorganized territory has a total area of 18.0 square miles (46.6 km^{2}), of which 17.7 square miles (45.8 km^{2}) is land and 0.3 square mile (0.8 km^{2}) (1.72%) is water.

== Demographics ==
At the 2000 census there were 25 people, 13 households, and 6 families living in the unorganized territory. The population density was 1.4 inhabitants per square mile (0.54/km^{2}). There were 26 housing units at an average density of 1.5 per square mile (0.58/km^{2}). The racial makeup of the unorganized territory was 96.00% White and 4.00% Native American. Of the 13 households 23.1% had children under the age of 18 living with them, 30.8% were married couples living together, 7.7% had a female householder with no husband present, and 46.2% were non-families. 38.5% of households were one person and 23.1% were one person aged 65 or older. The average household size was 1.92 and the average family size was 2.57.

The age distribution was 20.0% under the age of 18, 36.0% from 25 to 44, 20.0% from 45 to 64, and 24.0% 65 or older. The median age was 43 years. For every 100 females, there were 150.0 males. For every 100 females age 18 and over, there were 185.7 males.

The median household income was $45,909 and the median family income was $45,795. Males had a median income of $26,111 versus $21,477 for females. The per capita income for the unorganized territory was $20,519.

== Namesake ==
The town is named after its original Postmaster, Fritz Gheen.
