= McCarthy Beach State Park =

State park in Minnesota, United States

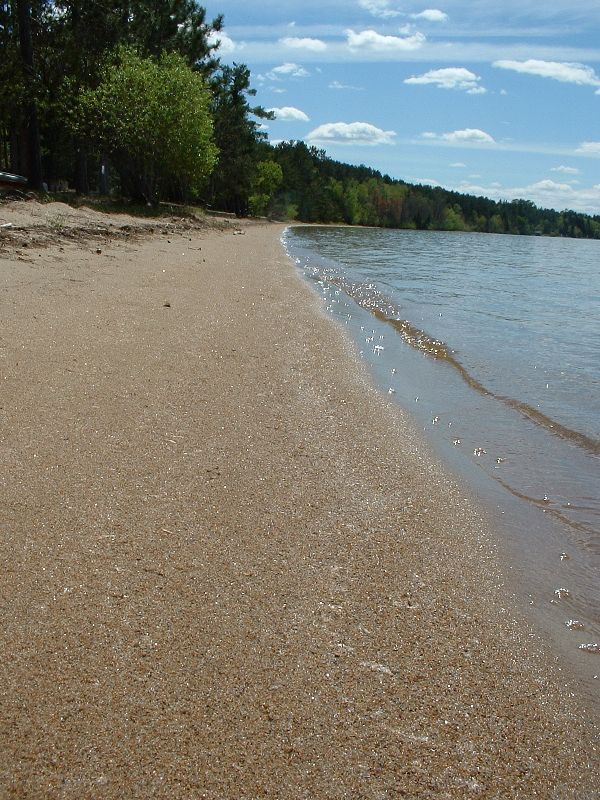
- McCarthy Beach State Park.

- Location within Minnesota Location within the United States
- Location: Saint Louis, Minnesota, United States
- Coordinates: 47°40′21″N 93°1′48″W
- Area: 2,471 acres (10.00 km^{2})
- Elevation: 1,381 ft (421 m)
- Established: 1945
- Governing body: Minnesota Department of Natural Resources

McCarthy Beach State Park is a state park of Minnesota, USA, on the Sturgeon Lake chain near Hibbing. It is located in French Township, Saint Louis County.

== Ecosystem ==
Thirty-three species of wildlife inhabit the park including white-tailed deer, black bears, timber wolves, chipmunks, red squirrels, raccoons, and several species of reptiles and amphibians. More than 175 species of birds also visit the area.

The park protects a northern boreal forest with stands of red and white pine and leatherleaf-black spruce lowlands.

== Geology ==
The glaciers that moved through the area gouged and tore at the bedrock, the cooled lava of ancient volcanoes. During that period, glaciers flowed south, retreated north, and flowed south again. The first glacier stopped where McCarthy Beach is now located. It left low rolling hills with steep sides called moraines. Between the hills, the glaciers gouged valleys and in the larger valleys, lakes were formed.

== History ==
In 1895, the Swan River Logging Company built a railroad to Sturgeon Lake. The railroad hauled logs to the Swan River where they were floated down the Mississippi River to Minneapolis sawmills. Over the years, the area became a popular picnic and tenting ground for people from the Iron Range. When the property owner John A. McCarthy died in 1943, his daughter sold the land to a lumberman. Local citizens became concerned about the fate of the timber and were able to persuade the new owner to sell the land. Locals raised some of the money to finance the sale. By matching local money with state money the land was purchased and became a state park in 1945.

== Statistics ==
- 2,311 acres (9.35 km^{2})
- 115,842 annual visits
