= Minnesota State Highway 73 =

State highway in Minnesota, United States

Trunk Highway 73
- MN 73 highlighted in red

Route information
- Maintained by MnDOT
- Length: 119.697 mi (192.634 km)
- Existed: 1933–present

Major junctions
- South end: I-35 near Moose Lake
- MN 210 at Cromwell; US 2 at Floodwood; US 169 / MN 37 at Hibbing; US 169 at Chisholm; MN 1 at Linden Grove
- North end: US 53 in Field Township

Location
- Country: United States
- State: Minnesota
- Counties: Carlton, St. Louis

Highway system
- Minnesota Trunk Highway System; Interstate; US; State; Legislative; Scenic
← MN 72	→ MN 74

Minnesota State Highway 73 (MN 73) is a 119.697-mile-long (192.634 km) highway in northeast Minnesota, which runs from its interchange with Interstate Highway 35 in Moose Lake and continues north to its northern terminus at its intersection with U.S. Highway 53 in Field Township near Cook and Orr.

== Route description ==
Highway 73 serves as a north–south route in northeast Minnesota between Moose Lake, Kettle River, Cromwell, Floodwood, Hibbing, and Chisholm.

The roadway passes through the Sturgeon River State Forest and the Superior National Forest, both north of Chisholm, in Saint Louis County.

The route is legally defined as Legislative Route 163 in the Minnesota Statutes. It is not marked with this number.

== History ==
Highway 73 was authorized in 1933, and was originally numbered "Minnesota 63" until that U.S. route number was added elsewhere in Minnesota.

The route was marked as "Minnesota 73" by 1935.

In 1940, the route was mostly gravel south of Hibbing. The last segments paved in the mid-1950s were south of Hibbing.

The Highway 73 designation was extended south through Moose Lake, partially along old U.S. 61, to Interstate 35 in the mid-1970s.

== Major intersections ==
County	Location	mi	km	Destinations	Notes
Carlton	Moose Lake Township	0.000	0.000	I-35 / CR 137 – Duluth, Saint Paul, Minneapolis	Interchange
Carlton	Moose Lake	1.136	1.828	MN 289 east – Minnesota Correctional Facility	
Carlton	Moose Lake	1.486	2.391	CSAH 61 south / Old US 61	South end of CSAH 61 overlap
Carlton	Moose Lake	2.289	3.684	MN 27 east / CSAH 61 north / Old US 61 – Duluth	South end of MN 27 overlap; north end of CSAH 61 overlap
Carlton	Silver Township	7.007	11.277	MN 27 west to MN 65	North end of MN 27 overlap
Carlton	Cromwell	25.225	40.596	MN 210 – Duluth, Aitkin	
St. Louis	Floodwood Township	42.874	68.999	US 2 east – Duluth	South end of US 2 overlap
St. Louis	Floodwood	43.120	69.395	US 2 west – Grand Rapids	North end of US 2 overlap
St. Louis	Hibbing	78.846	126.890	US 169 south – Grand Rapids	South end of US 169 overlap
St. Louis	Hibbing			Downtown (1st Avenue)	Interchange; former Bus. US 169 / MN 73
St. Louis	Hibbing			MN 37 east – Eveleth	
St. Louis	Hibbing			Howard Street	Former Bus. US 169 / MN 73
St. Louis	Chisholm	87.153	140.259	US 169 north / CSAH 5 – Virginia, McCarthy Beach State Park	North end of US 169 overlap
St. Louis	Linden Grove	114.637	184.490	MN 1 – Cook, Effie	
St. Louis	Field Township	119.855	192.888	US 53 – Virginia, International Falls	
1.000 mi = 1.609 km; 1.000 km = 0.621 mi: Concurrency terminus
