= Gheen (community), Minnesota =

Gheen
- Unincorporated community
- Location within Minnesota Location within the United States
- Coordinates: 47°58′05″N 92°48′30″W
- Country: United States
- State: Minnesota
- County: Saint Louis
- Elevation: 1,362 ft (415 m)

Population
  - Total: 25
- Time zone: UTC-6 (Central (CST))
  - Summer (DST): UTC-5 (CDT)
- ZIP codes: 55771
- Area code: 218
- GNIS feature ID: 661354

Gheen is an unincorporated community in Gheen Territory, Saint Louis County, Minnesota, United States, one mile (1.6 km) east of Gheen Corner on Willow River Road.

The community of Gheen is seven miles (11 km) south of Orr, and twelve miles (19 km) north of Cook.

U.S. Highway 53 is nearby. Gheen is located within the Kabetogama State Forest.

== History ==
A post office called Gheen was established in 1906 and remained in operation until 1993. The community was named for Edward Hickman Gheen, a Navy officer.
