= Leiding Township, St. Louis County, Minnesota =

Leiding Township, Minnesota
- Township
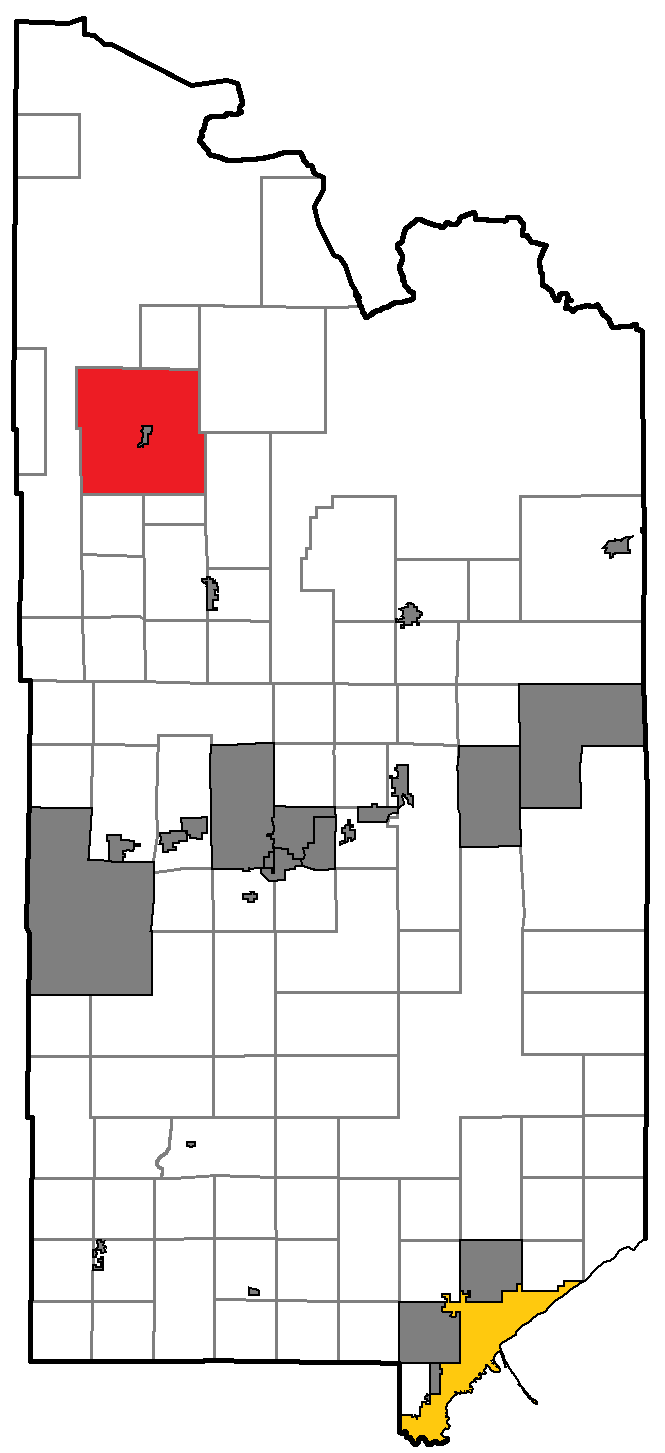
- Location of Leiding Township within St. Louis County, Minnesota
- Coordinates: 48°4′1″N 92°50′31″W
- Country: United States
- State: Minnesota
- County: Saint Louis

Area
  - Total: 141.0 sq mi (365.2 km^{2})
  - Land: 122.5 sq mi (317.3 km^{2})
  - Water: 18.5 sq mi (47.9 km^{2})
- Elevation: 1,300 ft (400 m)

Population (2020)
  - Total: 399
  - Density: 3.26/sq mi (1.26/km^{2})
- Time zone: UTC-6 (Central (CST))
  - Summer (DST): UTC-5 (CDT)
- ZIP code: 55771
- Area code: 218
- FIPS code: 27-36332
- GNIS feature ID: 0664749

Leiding Township is a township in Saint Louis County, Minnesota, United States. The population was 399 at the 2020 census.

U.S. Highway 53 serves as a main route in the township. Other routes include Orr–Buyck Road (Saint Louis County Road 23) and Nett Lake Road (also County Road 23).

The unincorporated communities of Cusson and Glendale are located within Leiding Township.

The city of Orr is located within Leiding Township geographically but is a separate entity.

== Geography ==
According to the United States Census Bureau, the township has a total area of 141.0 square miles (365 km^{2}); 122.5 square miles (317 km^{2}) is land and 18.5 square miles (48 km^{2}), or 13.12%, is water.

== Demographics ==
At the 2000 census there were 452 people, 193 households, and 133 families living in the township. The population density was 3.7 people per square mile (1.4/km^{2}). There were 417 housing units at an average density of 3.4/sq mi (1.3/km^{2}). The racial makeup of the township was 75.22% White, 20.35% Native American, 1.77% Asian, 0.88% from other races, and 1.77% from two or more races. Hispanic or Latino of any race were 0.66%.

Of the 193 households 25.9% had children under the age of 18 living with them, 56.5% were married couples living together, 8.3% had a female householder with no husband present, and 30.6% were non-families. 29.0% of households were one person and 9.3% were one person aged 65 or older. The average household size was 2.34 and the average family size was 2.78.

The age distribution was 22.3% under the age of 18, 7.3% from 18 to 24, 27.4% from 25 to 44, 29.0% from 45 to 64, and 13.9% 65 or older. The median age was 41 years. For every 100 females, there were 102.7 males. For every 100 females age 18 and over, there were 107.7 males.

The median household income was $39,464 and the median family income was $40,592. Males had a median income of $35,000 versus $21,875 for females. The per capita income for the township was $17,796. About 7.0% of families and 9.1% of the population were below the poverty line, including 17.5% of those under age 18 and 4.5% of those age 65 or over.

== Media ==
The official newspaper of Leiding is the Timberjay. The Timberjay is published weekly, with a circulation of over 1000.
