= Sturgeon, Minnesota =

Sturgeon
- Unincorporated community
- Location within Minnesota Location within the United States
- Coordinates: 47°46′36″N 92°52′08″W
- Country: United States
- State: Minnesota
- County: Saint Louis
- Township: Sturgeon Township
- Elevation: 1,302 ft (397 m)

Population
  - Total: 30
- Time zone: UTC-6 (Central (CST))
  - Summer (DST): UTC-5 (CDT)
- ZIP codes: 55703
- Area code: 218
- GNIS feature ID: 662575

Sturgeon is an unincorporated community in Sturgeon Township, Saint Louis County, Minnesota, United States.

The community is 14 miles (23 km) southwest of Cook at the junction of State Highway 73 (MN 73) and Saint Louis County Road 22 (CR 22). It is 20 miles (32 km) north of Chisholm.

Sturgeon is near the Sturgeon River State Forest and the Superior National Forest in Saint Louis County.
