= Side Lake, Minnesota =

Side Lake
- Unincorporated community
- Location within Minnesota Location within the United States
- Coordinates: 47°39′55″N 93°00′57″W
- Country: United States
- State: Minnesota
- County: Saint Louis
- Township: French Township
- Elevation: 1,401 ft (427 m)

Population
  - Total: 70
- Time zone: UTC-6 (Central (CST))
  - Summer (DST): UTC-5 (CDT)
- ZIP codes: 55781
- Area code: 218
- GNIS feature ID: 662444

Side Lake is an unincorporated community in French Township, Saint Louis County, Minnesota, United States.

The community is located 20 miles north of the city of Hibbing on Saint Louis County Highway 5 (CR 5).

McCarthy Beach State Park is nearby.
