= Gheen Corner, Minnesota =

Gheen Corner
- Unincorporated community
- Location within Minnesota Location within the United States
- Coordinates: 47°57′51″N 92°49′45″W
- Country: United States
- State: Minnesota
- County: Saint Louis
- Elevation: 1,342 ft (409 m)

Population
  - Total: 20
- Time zone: UTC-6 (Central (CST))
  - Summer (DST): UTC-5 (CDT)
- ZIP code: 55771
- Area code: 218
- GNIS feature ID: 661355

Gheen Corner is an unincorporated community in Saint Louis County, Minnesota, United States.

The community is located between Cook and Orr at the junction of U.S. Highway 53, County Road 74 (Willow River Road), and UT Road 8170.

Gheen Corner is located along the boundary line between Willow Valley Township and Gheen Unorganized Territory in Saint Louis County.

The unincorporated community of Gheen is also nearby.
