= Meadow Brook, Minnesota =

Meadow Brook
- Unincorporated community
- Location within Minnesota Location within the United States
- Coordinates: 47°51′46″N 92°57′17″W
- Country: United States
- State: Minnesota
- County: Saint Louis
- Township: Linden Grove Township
- Elevation: 1,289 ft (393 m)

Population
  - Total: 10
- Time zone: UTC-6 (Central (CST))
  - Summer (DST): UTC-5 (CDT)
- ZIP code: 55723
- Area code: 218
- GNIS feature ID: 661895

Meadow Brook is an unincorporated community in Linden Grove Township, Saint Louis County, Minnesota, United States.

The community is located 12 miles (19 km) west of Cook at the intersection of State Highway 1 (MN 1) and Saint Louis County Road 139 (Range Line Road).
