= Celina, Minnesota =

Celina
- Unincorporated community
- Location within Minnesota Location within the United States
- Coordinates: 47°51′57″N 93°03′43″W
- Country: United States
- State: Minnesota
- County: Saint Louis
- Elevation: 1,319 ft (402 m)

Population
  - Total: 10
- Time zone: UTC-6 (Central (CST))
  - Summer (DST): UTC-5 (CDT)
- ZIP code: 55723
- Area code: 218
- GNIS feature ID: 660973

Celina was an unincorporated community in Saint Louis County, Minnesota, United States. The early 20th century community was once home to a Lutheran church, post office, and general stores. The village was located near Greaney and Bear River, Minnesota.

== Geography ==
The community was located 18 miles west of Cook at the junction of State Highway 1 (MN 1) and Saint Louis County Highway 5 (CR 5). The boundary line between Saint Louis, Itasca, and Koochiching counties is near Celina.

Celina was 112 miles from the county seat of Duluth, Minnesota. The communities of Greaney, Bear River, and Togo are nearby.

=== Climate ===
Climate data for Celina 2E, Minnesota, 1991–2020 normals, 2011-2020 precip/snowfall: 1285ft (392m)
| Month | Jan | Feb | Mar | Apr | May | Jun | Jul | Aug | Sep | Oct | Nov | Dec | Year |
|---|---|---|---|---|---|---|---|---|---|---|---|---|---|
| Record high °F (°C) | 45 (7) | 59 (15) | 76 (24) | 80 (27) | 91 (33) | 90 (32) | 94 (34) | 91 (33) | 87 (31) | 87 (31) | 69 (21) | 45 (7) | 94 (34) |
| Mean maximum °F (°C) | 37.1 (2.8) | 42.4 (5.8) | 57.0 (13.9) | 68.7 (20.4) | 83.1 (28.4) | 84.9 (29.4) | 89.0 (31.7) | 86.5 (30.3) | 82.0 (27.8) | 73.9 (23.3) | 53.5 (11.9) | 40.5 (4.7) | 88.3 (31.3) |
| Mean daily maximum °F (°C) | 16.8 (−8.4) | 22.3 (−5.4) | 35.7 (2.1) | 50.1 (10.1) | 64.3 (17.9) | 72.2 (22.3) | 76.8 (24.9) | 75.4 (24.1) | 66.0 (18.9) | 51.2 (10.7) | 34.6 (1.4) | 21.8 (−5.7) | 48.9 (9.4) |
| Daily mean °F (°C) | 5.0 (−15.0) | 8.8 (−12.9) | 23.4 (−4.8) | 37.4 (3.0) | 50.6 (10.3) | 59.6 (15.3) | 64.0 (17.8) | 62.2 (16.8) | 53.9 (12.2) | 40.9 (4.9) | 26.1 (−3.3) | 12.2 (−11.0) | 37.0 (2.8) |
| Mean daily minimum °F (°C) | −6.7 (−21.5) | −4.6 (−20.3) | 11.1 (−11.6) | 24.6 (−4.1) | 36.8 (2.7) | 47.0 (8.3) | 51.1 (10.6) | 48.9 (9.4) | 41.7 (5.4) | 30.6 (−0.8) | 17.5 (−8.1) | 2.6 (−16.3) | 25.1 (−3.9) |
| Mean minimum °F (°C) | −37.4 (−38.6) | −32.7 (−35.9) | −22.0 (−30.0) | 5.0 (−15.0) | 22.1 (−5.5) | 28.7 (−1.8) | 38.5 (3.6) | 34.3 (1.3) | 24.5 (−4.2) | 15.9 (−8.9) | −8.2 (−22.3) | −25.9 (−32.2) | −37.9 (−38.8) |
| Record low °F (°C) | −47 (−44) | −47 (−44) | −38 (−39) | −7 (−22) | 17 (−8) | 24 (−4) | 34 (1) | 31 (−1) | 19 (−7) | 10 (−12) | −17 (−27) | −39 (−39) | −47 (−44) |
| Average precipitation inches (mm) | 0.97 (25) | 0.86 (22) | 1.05 (27) | 2.12 (54) | 3.09 (78) | 4.61 (117) | 4.20 (107) | 3.53 (90) | 3.19 (81) | 2.50 (64) | 1.42 (36) | 1.30 (33) | 28.84 (734) |
| Average snowfall inches (cm) | 13.1 (33) | 13.1 (33) | 6.7 (17) | 8.7 (22) | trace | 0.0 (0.0) | 0.0 (0.0) | 0.0 (0.0) | trace | 2.0 (5.1) | 7.6 (19) | 13.0 (33) | 64.2 (162.1) |
Source 1: NOAA
Source 2: XMACIS (precip/snowfall, records & monthly max/mins)

== History ==
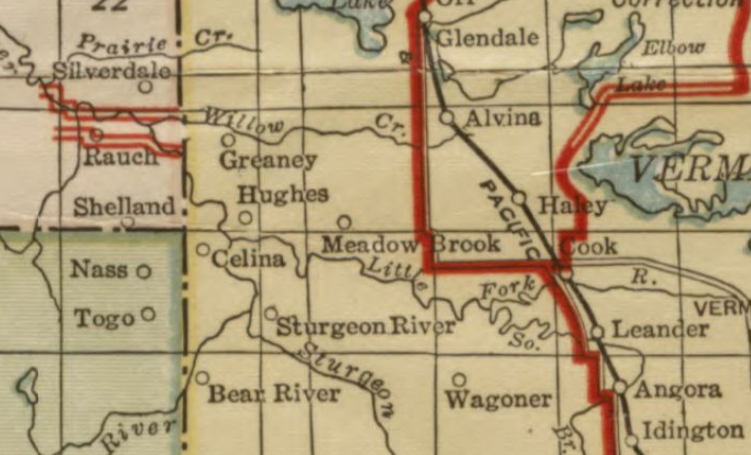
1920 map of west central St Louis County, Minnesota, showing the locations of Celina, Greaney, Hughes, and other communities.

Celina was a St. Louis County village in the early 20th century. A post office operated in Celina from 1908 to 1913. The postmaster was Theodore Hall. In 1913, the post office closed; mail was routed through Nass. The post office reopened in 1914 and closed again in 1935. John Gilbertson also served as a postmaster in Celina.

The Evangelical Lutheran Church operated in Celina around this time; the Celina Lutheran Church was founded in 1909. An area resident wrote, "There is room here for many more of our Norwegian Lutheran people. The country about Cook, Bear River, Celina, Sturgeon River, and several places here, is very good and yet cheap. St. Louis County is known for the good roads that are built, and the mining companies have to pay most of the cost. There are good schools here, the "range towns" are known all over the country for their splendid school buildings and their good system of governance. [...] In Celina, we plan to build a church in the spring, if everything goes according to what we have planned."

There were also two general stores in Celina, one operated by Theodore Hall.

A lookout tower was to be constructed in the Celina area in 1929 to protect the area from fires.

In 1940, Celina's population was 5.

In 1974, the County Highway 114 bridge on the Little Fork River between the communities of Greaney and Celina was heavily damaged by fire. The cost to repair the bridge was estimated at $750,000. The bridge, which was 200 feet (61 m) long, was the main link between the two settlements.

In 2006, Celina had an estimated population of 10.

== See also ==
- Meadow Brook, Minnesota
