= Bear River (Sturgeon River tributary) =

Coordinates: 47.8346481°N 93.0221222°W

Location
- Country: United States

Physical characteristics
- Source
  - location: Minnesota

The Bear River is a river of Minnesota. It is a tributary of the Sturgeon River, a tributary of the Little Fork River.

== See also ==
- List of rivers of Minnesota
