= Linden Grove, Minnesota =

Linden Grove
- Unincorporated community
- Location within Minnesota Location within the United States
- Coordinates: 47°51′47″N 92°52′14″W
- Country: United States
- State: Minnesota
- County: Saint Louis
- Township: Linden Grove Township
- Elevation: 1,309 ft (399 m)

Population
  - Total: 10
- Time zone: UTC-6 (Central (CST))
  - Summer (DST): UTC-5 (CDT)
- ZIP code: 55723
- Area code: 218
- GNIS feature ID: 661723

Linden Grove is an unincorporated community in Linden Grove Township, Saint Louis County, Minnesota, United States.

The community is 14 miles (23 km) south of Orr, and eight miles (13 km) west of Cook, at the junction of State Highway 1 (MN 1) and State Highway 73 (MN 73).

The Little Fork River flows through the community.
