= Dark River, Minnesota =

Unorganized territory of Saint Louis County, Minnesota, United States

Coordinates: 47°40′26″N 92°51′54″W

Dark River is an unorganized territory in Saint Louis County, Minnesota, United States, located north of Chisholm and Balkan Township. The population was 68 at the 2000 census.

== Geography ==
According to the United States Census Bureau, the unorganized territory has a total area of 38.0 square miles (98.4 km^{2}), of which 37.9 square miles (98.3 km^{2}) is land and 0.04 square mile (0.1 km^{2}) (0.11%) is water.

== Demographics ==
At the 2000 United States census there were 68 people, 22 households, and 21 families living in the unorganized territory. The population density was 1.8 inhabitants per square mile (0.69/km^{2}). There were 39 housing units at an average density of 1.0 per square mile (0.39/km^{2}). The racial makeup was 92.65% White, 1.47% from other races, and 5.88% from two or more races. Hispanic or Latino of any race were 13.24%.

Of the 22 households 31.8% had children under the age of 18 living with them, 86.4% were married couples living together, and 4.5% were non-families. 4.5% of households were one person and none had someone living alone who was 65 or older. The average household size was 3.09 and the average family size was 3.14.

The age distribution was 29.4% under the age of 18, 5.9% from 18 to 24, 29.4% from 25 to 44, 25.0% from 45 to 64, and 10.3% 65 or older. The median age was 38 years. For every 100 females, there were 126.7 males. For every 100 females age 18 and over, there were 108.7 males.

The median household income was $29,107 and the median family income was $29,107. Males had a median income of $28,750 versus $0 for females. The per capita income for the unorganized territory was $10,984. None of the population or the families were below the poverty line.
