= Northwest St. Louis, Minnesota =

Unorganized territory in St. Louis County, Minnesota, United States

Coordinates: 48°17′57″N 92°50′19″W

- Unorganized territory
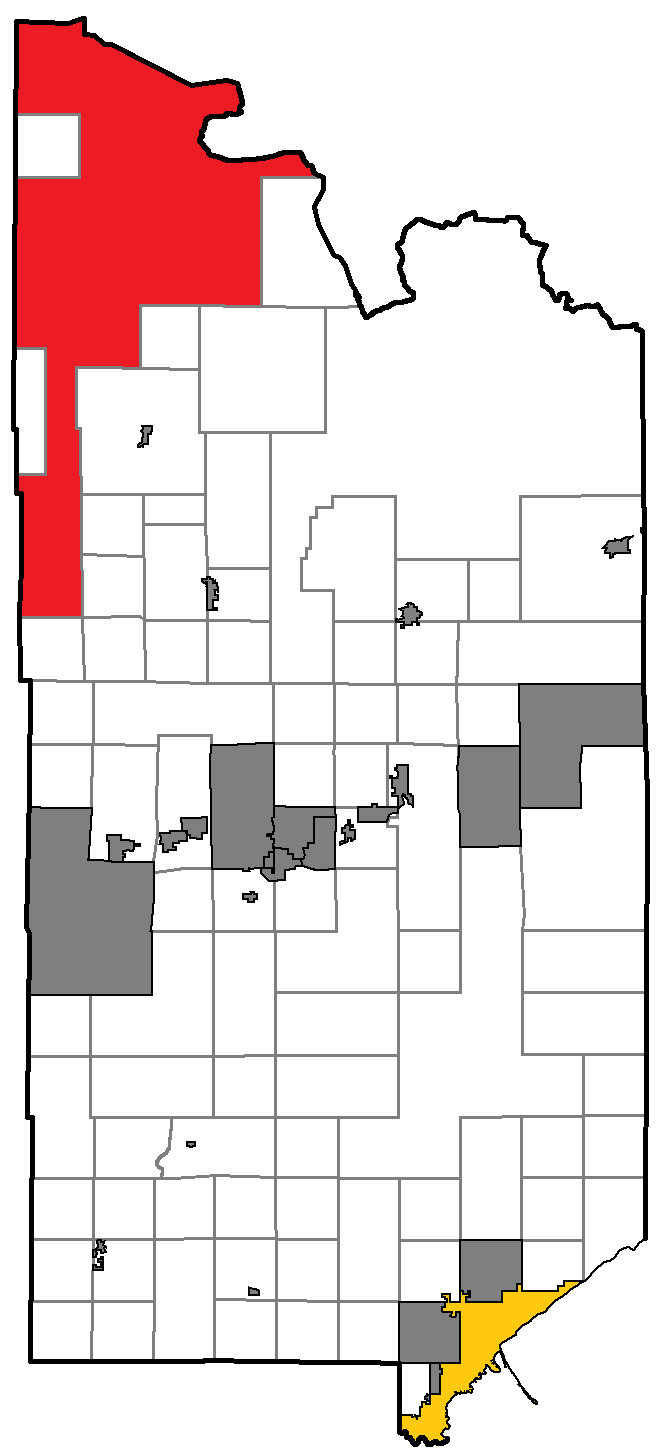
- Location of Northwest St. Louis within St. Louis County, Minnesota
- Country: United States
- State: Minnesota
- County: St. Louis

Area
  - Total: 676.09 sq mi (1,751.1 km^{2})
  - Land: 578.17 sq mi (1,497.5 km^{2})
  - Water: 97.92 sq mi (253.6 km^{2})

Population (2020)
  - Total: 271
  - Density: 0.469/sq mi (0.181/km^{2})
- Time zone: UTC-6 (Central (CST))
  - Summer (DST): UTC-5 (CDT)
- Area code: 218

Northwest St. Louis is an unorganized territory in Saint Louis County, Minnesota, United States. The population was 271 at the 2020 census.

== Geography ==
According to the United States Census Bureau, the unorganized territory has a total area of 711.7 square miles (1,843.2 km^{2}); 594.5 square miles (1,539.6 km^{2}) is land and 117.2 square miles (303.6 km^{2}) (16.47%) is water.

== Demographics ==
At the 2000 United States census there were 306 people, 146 households, and 89 families living in the unorganized territory. The population density was 0.5 inhabitants per square mile (0.19/km^{2}). There were 792 housing units at an average density of 1.3 per square mile (0.50/km^{2}). The racial makeup of the unorganized territory was 95.75% White, 2.61% Native American, 0.65% Asian, and 0.98% from two or more races. Hispanic or Latino of any race were 1.63%.

Of the 146 households, 21.9% had children under the age of 18 living with them, 54.8% were married couples living together, 2.1% had a female householder with no husband present, and 38.4% were non-families. 32.9% of households were one person and 11.0% were one person aged 65 or older. The average household size was 2.10 and the average family size was 2.66.

The age distribution was 19.3% under the age of 18, 3.6% from 18 to 24, 27.8% from 25 to 44, 29.1% from 45 to 64, and 20.3% 65 or older. The median age was 45 years. For every 100 females, there were 130.1 males. For every 100 females age 18 and over, there were 124.5 males.

The median household income was $37,946 and the median family income was $40,357. Males had a median income of $35,833 versus $21,563 for females. The per capita income for the unorganized territory was $21,457. About 5.2% of families and 6.9% of the population were below the poverty line, including none of those under the age of 18 and 17.5% of those 65 or over.
