= Sturgeon River (Little Fork River tributary) =

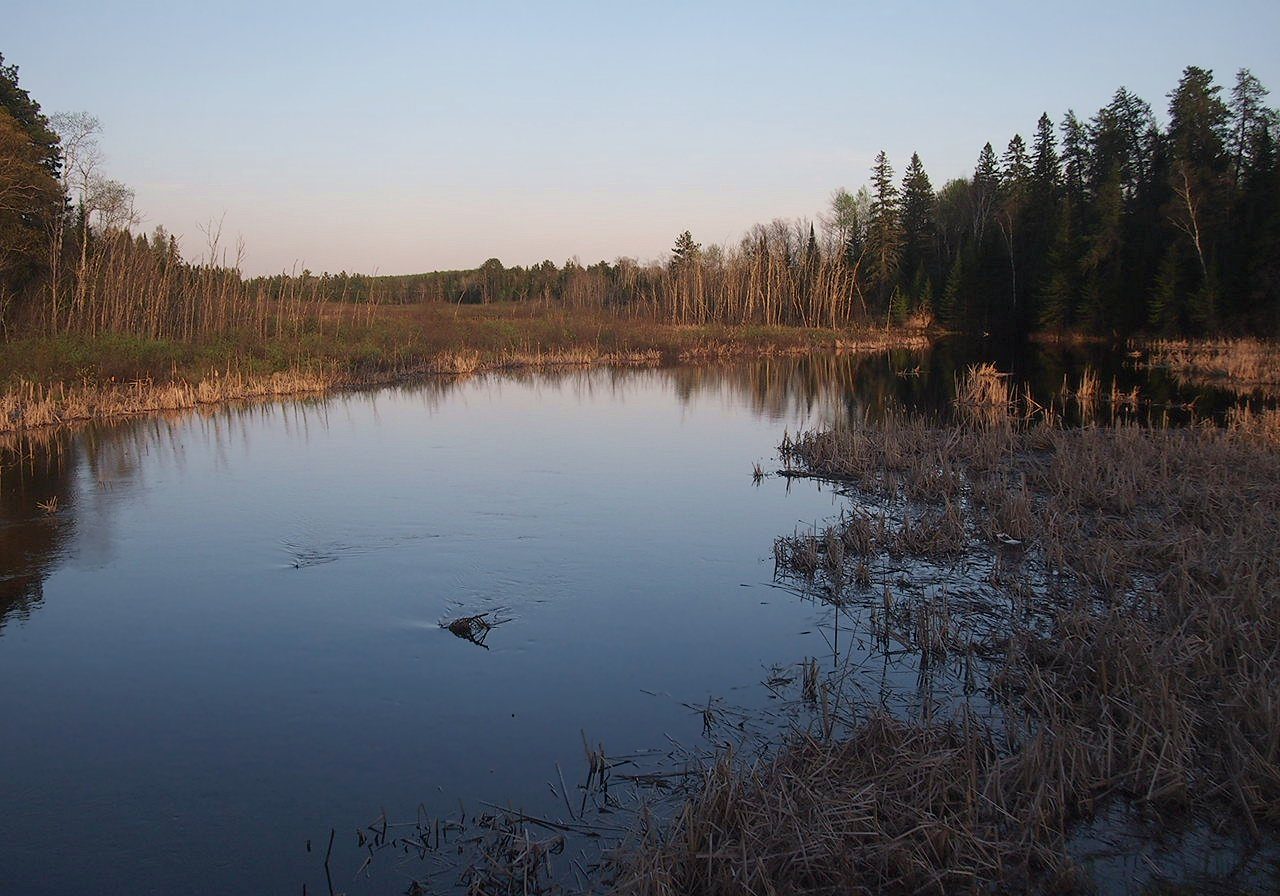
- The Sturgeon River in French Township

Location
- Country: United States

Physical characteristics
- Source
  - location: Minnesota
- Mouth
  - location: Little Fork River
  - coordinates: 47°53′1″N 93°1′47″W

The Sturgeon River is a river of Minnesota, United States, located in Saint Louis County. It flows through Sturgeon Township and French Township, north of Chisholm and Hibbing, and is a tributary of the Little Fork River.

Sturgeon River was so named for its stock of rock sturgeon fish.

== See also ==
- List of rivers of Minnesota
