= Cook, Minnesota =

City in Minnesota, United States

Cook
- City
- Motto: "Gateway To Lake Vermilion"
- Location of the city of Cook within Saint Louis County, Minnesota
- Coordinates: 47°51′11″N 92°41′12″W
- Country: United States
- State: Minnesota
- County: Saint Louis
- Established: 1903

Area
  - Total: 2.60 sq mi (6.73 km^{2})
  - Land: 2.60 sq mi (6.73 km^{2})
  - Water: 0 sq mi (0.00 km^{2})
- Elevation: 1,306 ft (398 m)

Population (2020)
  - Total: 534
  - Density: 205/sq mi (79.3/km^{2})
- Time zone: UTC-6 (Central (CST))
  - Summer (DST): UTC-5 (CDT)
- ZIP code: 55723
- Area code: 218
- FIPS code: 27-13006
- GNIS feature ID: 0661042
- Website: City of Cook

Cook is a city in Saint Louis County, Minnesota, United States. The population was 534 at the 2020 census.

U.S. Highway 53 and State Highway 1 (MN 1) are the two main routes through the city. Cook serves as the gateway to the western half of Lake Vermilion.

== History ==
The city of Cook was known initially as Little Fork, because of the river of the same name that runs through the city, later known as Ashawa, which means "by the river or across the river"; its name was changed to Cook on August 1, 1908, at the request of the U.S. Postal Service "because of confusion with a village in southern Minnesota named Oshawa". The town was named in honor of Wirth Cook, an owner of the railroad that was constructed through Cook in 1903 and 1904. Cook was incorporated on May 13, 1926.

== Geography ==
According to the United States Census Bureau, the city has an area of 2.53 square miles (6.55 km^{2}), all land.

== Demographics ==
Historical population
Census	Pop.	Note	%±
1930	272		—
1940	470		72.8%
1950	482		2.6%
1960	527		9.3%
1970	687		30.4%
1980	800		16.4%
1990	680		−15.0%
2000	622		−8.5%
2010	574		−7.7%
2020	534		−7.0%
U.S. Decennial Census

=== 2019 census ===
As of the census of 2019, there were 515 people, 268 households, and 134 families living in the city. The population density was 226.9 inhabitants per square mile (87.6/km^{2}). There were 306 housing units at an average density of 120.9 per square mile (46.7/km^{2}). The racial makeup of the city was 92.0% White, 0.2% African American, 4.9% Native American, 0.2% Pacific Islander, 0.3% from other races, and 2.4% from two or more races. Hispanic or Latino of any race were 0.9% of the population.

There were 268 households, of which 23.1% had children under the age of 18 living with them, 38.1% were married couples living together, 10.4% had a female householder with no husband present, 1.5% had a male householder with no wife present, and 50.0% were non-families. 43.3% of all households were made up of individuals, and 20.9% had someone living alone who was 65 years of age or older. The average household size was 2.04 and the average family size was 2.84.

The median age in the city was 47 years. 19.5% of residents were under the age of 18; 6.6% were between the ages of 18 and 24; 22.3% were from 25 to 44; 28.5% were from 45 to 64; and 23% were 65 years of age or older. The gender makeup of the city was 47.6% male and 52.4% female.

=== 2000 census ===
As of the 2000 census, there were 622 people, 275 households, and 158 families living in the city. The population density was 790.1 inhabitants per square mile (305.1/km^{2}). There were 302 housing units at an average density of 383.6 per square mile (148.1/km^{2}). The racial makeup of the city was 96.8% White, 0.2% African American, 1.6% Native American, 0.8% from other races, and 0.6% from two or more races. Hispanic or Latino of any race were 0.6% of the population. 20.3% were of Norwegian, 16.7% Finnish, 13.9% German, 12.7% Swedish, 6.6% American and 4.9% Irish ancestry.

There were 275 households, out of which 27.3% had children under the age of 18 living with them, 38.9% were married couples living together, 13.1% had a female householder with no husband present, and 42.5% were non-families. 39.3% of all households were made up of individuals, and 24.4% had someone living alone who was 65 years of age or older. The average household size was 2.11 and the average family size was 2.82.

In the city, the population was spread out, with 21.5% under the age of 18, 8.0% from 18 to 24, 24.1% from 25 to 44, 19.8% from 45 to 64, and 26.5% who were 65 years of age or older. The median age was 42 years. For every 100 females, there were 80.8 males. For every 100 females age 18 and over, there were 80.1 males.

The median income for a household in the city was $21,607, and the median income for a family was $34,643. Males had a median income of $30,833 versus $22,232 for females. The per capita income for the city was $15,848. About 9.5% of families and 13.0% of the population were below the poverty line, including 18.8% of those under age 18 and 9.2% of those age 65 or over.

== Infrastructure ==
=== Transportation ===
U.S. Highway 53 and State Highway 1 (MN 1) are two of the main routes in Cook.

== Education ==
North Woods School serves the Cook area. The mascot is the Grizzly.

== Notable people ==
- Doug Johnson, Minnesota state legislator and high school counselor
- Rachel Latuff, educator
- Noel Wien, aviator
- Keith Secola, musician
