= Bramble, Minnesota =

Unincorporated community in Minnesota, United States

Bramble
- Unincorporated community
- Location within Minnesota Location within the United States
- Coordinates: 47°54′18″N 93°09′53″W
- Country: United States
- State: Minnesota
- County: Koochiching
- Time zone: UTC-6 (Central (CST))
  - Summer (DST): UTC-5 (CDT)
- Area code: 218
- GNIS feature ID: 2106260

Bramble is an unincorporated community in Koochiching County, Minnesota, United States, located in the southeast corner of the county.

The community is located between Togo and Rauch; near the intersection of State Highway 65 (MN 65) and Koochiching County Road 66 (CR 66).

The boundary line between Koochiching, Saint Louis, and Itasca counties is nearby.

== Geography ==
Bramble is located within South Koochiching Unorganized Territory. The community is located at the southeast corner of the Koochiching State Forest. Nearby places include Rauch, Silverdale, Greaney, Togo, Nett Lake, and Orr. Bramble is located 26 miles southwest of Orr and 13 miles north of Togo. Bramble is 27 miles northwest of Cook and 69 miles south of International Falls.

== History ==
Saints Peter and Paul Russian Orthodox Historic Church is located at Bramble.

A post office operated in the community of Bramble from 1928 to 1936.
