= Greaney, Minnesota =

Greaney
- Unincorporated community
- Location within Minnesota Location within the United States
- Coordinates: 47°58′02″N 93°01′16″W
- Country: United States
- State: Minnesota
- County: Saint Louis
- Elevation: 1,302 ft (397 m)

Population
  - Total: 10
- Time zone: UTC-6 (Central (CST))
  - Summer (DST): UTC-5 (CDT)
- ZIP code: 55771
- Area code: 218
- GNIS feature ID: 661391

Greaney is an unincorporated community in Saint Louis County, Minnesota, United States. Greaney is located within ZIP code 55771, based in Orr.

== Geography ==
The community is located 14 miles southwest of Orr, and 20 miles northwest of Cook, at the junction of Saint Louis County Roads 74 and 75.

The Willow River, a tributary of the Little Fork River, flows through the community.

Nearby places include Silverdale, Rauch, Celina, Togo, Orr, and Nett Lake. Nett Lake Indian Reservation (Bois Forte Indian Reservation) is also nearby.

== History ==
A post office called Greaney was established in 1909, and remained in operation until 1954. The community was named for Patrick Greaney, an early settler.
