= Silverdale, Minnesota =

Unincorporated community in Minnesota, United States

Silverdale
- Unincorporated community
- Location within Minnesota Location within the United States
- Coordinates: 47°59′10″N 93°06′35″W
- Country: United States
- State: Minnesota
- County: Koochiching
- Elevation: 1,312 ft (400 m)
- Time zone: UTC-6 (Central (CST))
  - Summer (DST): UTC-5 (CDT)
- ZIP code: 55771
- Area code: 218
- GNIS feature ID: 654944

Silverdale is an unincorporated community in Koochiching County, Minnesota, United States; located in the southeast corner of the county.

The community is located between Orr and Togo at the junction of State Highway 65 (MN 65) and County Road 74.

Silverdale is located within ZIP code 55771 based in Orr. The boundary line between Koochiching and Saint Louis counties is nearby.

The Little Fork River flows through the area. The Willow River, a tributary of the Little Fork River, is also nearby.

== Geography ==
Silverdale is located on the edge of the Koochiching State Forest. The community is located within South Koochiching Unorganized Territory.

Nearby places include Rauch, Greaney, Nett Lake, and Orr. Silverdale is located 22 mi (35 km) west-southwest of Orr; and 17 mi (27 km) north of Togo. Silverdale is 25 mi (40 km) northwest of Cook; and 64 mi (103 km) south of International Falls.

The community consists of Township 63 of Range 22 and 23; and the northern sections of Township 64 of Range 22 and 23.
