= Owens Township, St. Louis County, Minnesota =

Owens Township, Minnesota
- Township
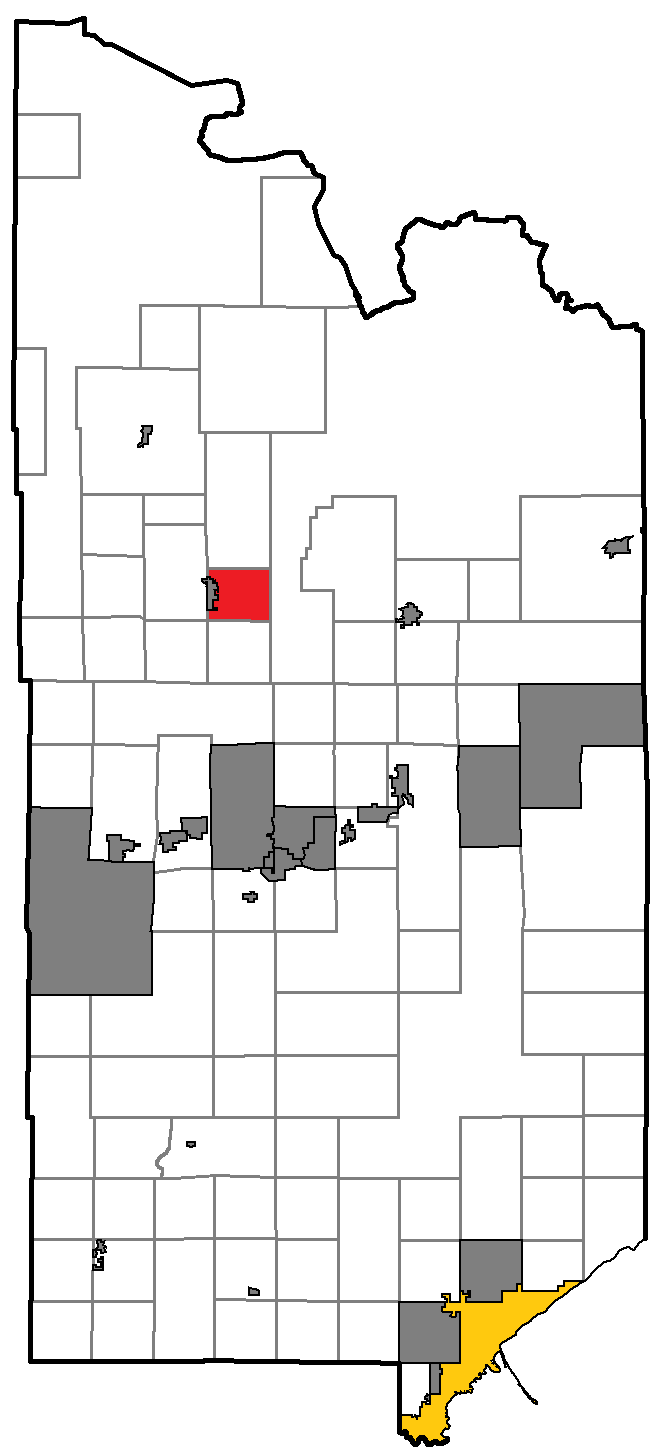
- Location of Owens Township within St. Louis County, Minnesota
- Coordinates: 47°49′22″N 92°38′15″W
- Country: United States
- State: Minnesota
- County: Saint Louis

Area
  - Total: 29.5 sq mi (76.4 km^{2})
  - Land: 29.5 sq mi (76.4 km^{2})
  - Water: 0 sq mi (0.0 km^{2})
- Elevation: 1,309 ft (399 m)

Population (2020)
  - Total: 253
  - Density: 8.58/sq mi (3.31/km^{2})
- Time zone: UTC-6 (Central (CST))
  - Summer (DST): UTC-5 (CDT)
- ZIP code: 55723
- Area code: 218
- FIPS code: 27-49336
- GNIS feature ID: 0665245

Owens Township is a township in Saint Louis County, Minnesota, United States. The population was 253 at the 2020 census.

U.S. Highway 53 serves as a main route in the township. Other routes include Saint Louis County Road 115, County Road 24 (Vermilion Drive), County Road 78 (Wakely Road), and Johnson Road.

The city of Cook is located within Owens Township geographically but is a separate entity.

== History ==
Owens Township was named for three Owens brothers (John, Samuel, and Thomas) who were businessmen in the area.

== Geography ==
According to the United States Census Bureau, the township has a total area of 29.5 square miles (76 km^{2}); 0.03% is water.

The Little Fork River flows through Owens Township.

The Rice River, a tributary of the Little Fork River, also flows through the township.

=== Adjacent townships, cities, and communities ===
The following are adjacent to Owens Township :

- The city of Cook (west)
- Field Township (west and northwest)
- Alango Township (southwest)
- Angora Township (south)
- The unincorporated community of Angora (south)
- The unincorporated community of Sherman Corner (south)
- Pfeiffer Lake Unorganized Territory (southeast)
- Northeast Saint Louis Unorganized Territory (east and northeast)
- Fortune Bay (east)
- Beatty Township (north)
- The unincorporated community of Wakemup (north)

Leander Road runs east–west along Owens Township's southern boundary line with adjacent Angora Township.

== Demographics ==
At the 2000 census there were 270 people, 111 households, and 81 families living in the township. The population density was 9.2 people per square mile (3.5/km^{2}). There were 134 housing units at an average density of 4.5/sq mi (1.8/km^{2}). The racial makeup of the township was 96.30% White, 2.96% Native American and 0.74% from two or more races. Of the 111 households 27.0% had children under the age of 18 living with them, 64.9% were married couples living together, 6.3% had a female householder with no husband present, and 27.0% were non-families. 22.5% of households were one person and 5.4% were one person aged 65 or older. The average household size was 2.43 and the average family size was 2.81.

The age distribution was 21.1% under the age of 18, 8.9% from 18 to 24, 21.1% from 25 to 44, 34.4% from 45 to 64, and 14.4% 65 or older. The median age was 44 years. For every 100 females, there were 101.5 males. For every 100 females age 18 and over, there were 102.9 males.

The median household income was $40,208 and the median family income was $40,625. Males had a median income of $35,000 versus $23,750 for females. The per capita income for the township was $15,892. About 13.5% of families and 13.1% of the population were below the poverty line, including 26.5% of those under the age of eighteen and none of those sixty five or over.
