= National Register of Historic Places listings in Koochiching County, Minnesota =

Location of Koochiching County in Minnesota

This is a list of the National Register of Historic Places listings in Koochiching County, Minnesota. It is intended to be a complete list of the properties and districts on the National Register of Historic Places in Koochiching County, Minnesota, United States. The locations of National Register properties and districts for which the latitude and longitude coordinates are included below, may be seen in an online map.

There are 14 properties and districts listed on the National Register in the county, including one National Historic Landmark. A supplementary list includes one additional site that was formerly listed on the National Register.

This National Park Service list is complete through NPS recent listings posted November 6, 2026.

== Current listings ==
	Name on the Register	Image	Date listed	Location	City or town	Description
1	Alexander Baker School and E.W. Backus Junior High School	Alexander Baker School and E.W. Backus Junior High School	May 26, 2004 (#04000538)	900 5th St. 48°36′04″N 93°24′49″W	International Falls	Adjoining schools opened in 1914 and 1936, significant for their roles in local educational and social life, as examples of early-20th-century school architecture, and for the Backus school's status as Koochiching County's largest Public Works Administration project.
2	Finstad's Auto Marine Shop	Finstad's Auto Marine Shop	January 27, 1983 (#83000906)	3475 Finstad Ln. 48°36′57″N 93°20′51″W	Ranier	1911 boat repair shop with its original belt-driven machinery; a well-preserved reminder of the early tourists and summer residents attracted to the Rainy Lake region.
3	Gold Mine Sites	Gold Mine Sites	May 6, 1977 (#77000155)	Around Rainy Lake in Voyageurs National Park; 48°36′09″N 93°10′05″W	Island View vicinity	District of seven scattered mine shafts and test pits from an 1894 gold rush that brought industry and settlement to the area.
4	Grand Mound	Grand Mound	June 23, 2011 (#11000565)	Address restricted 48°31′00″N 93°42′31″W	International Falls vicinity	Giant burial mound built by the Laurel complex around 200 BCE, the largest surviving prehistoric structure in the upper Midwest.
5	Koochiching County Courthouse	Koochiching County Courthouse	September 15, 1977 (#77000749)	4th St. and 7th Ave. 48°36′04″N 93°24′38″W	International Falls	Neoclassical/Renaissance Revival courthouse built 1909–10, significant for its public architecture, interior murals, and long service as county government seat.
6	Laurel Mounds	Laurel Mounds	January 20, 1972 (#72000678)	Address restricted 48°31′00″N 93°42′28″W	International Falls vicinity	Laurel complex village site and the 45-foot (14 m) Grand Mound plus four smaller burial mounds.
7	Little American Mine	Little American Mine	April 16, 1975 (#75000226)	Little American Island in Voyageurs National Park; 48°36′09″N 93°10′05″W	Island View vicinity	Remnants—consisting of mine shafts and scattered machinery—from Minnesota's only profitable gold mine, in operation 1893–1898, which prompted the gold rush that brought settlers to the Rainy Lake area. Now developed with an interpretive trail.
8	McKinstry Mounds and Village Site	McKinstry Mounds and Village Site	December 18, 1978 (#78001550)	Address restricted 48°31′25″N 93°35′09″W	Pelland	Woodland period village site with two burial mounds.
9	Nett Lake Petroglyphs Site	Nett Lake Petroglyphs Site	December 30, 1974 (#74001029)	Address restricted	Orr vicinity	Native American petroglyphs on Spirit Island in Nett Lake.
10	Ernest C. Oberholtzer Rainy Lake Islands Historic District	Ernest C. Oberholtzer Rainy Lake Islands Historic District	June 16, 2000 (#00000570)	Mallard, Hawk, and Crow Islands in Rainy Lake; 48°37′08″N 93°12′12″W	Ranier vicinity	Island-based residential complex of Ernest Oberholtzer (1884–1977), a national leader in conserving the Boundary Waters and other wilderness areas. Comprises 12 contributing properties built 1919–1944.
11	Ranier Community Building		May 29, 2018 (#100002502)	2099 Spruce St. 48°36′48″N 93°20′57″W	Ranier	1939 example of a multipurpose municipal building constructed in partnership with the Works Progress Administration, providing the city its longstanding hub of government and community events.
12	Sts. Peter and Paul Russian Orthodox Church	Sts. Peter and Paul Russian Orthodox Church	January 27, 1983 (#83000908)	Minnesota Highway 65; 47°54′23″N 93°10′00″W	Bramble vicinity	Onion domed church built 1915–18, associated with the early settlement of southeastern Koochiching County by Russians and other European immigrants.
13	Francis White Homestead		January 27, 1983 (#83000909)	North of Littlefork off U.S. Route 71; 48°25′35″N 93°34′06″W	Littlefork vicinity	Large log cabin built circa 1901, representative of the relatively late efforts of Euro-Americans to homestead and farm Koochiching County. Also served as the Forsythe Post Office 1904–1922.
14	Williams Township School		May 29, 2018 (#100002503)	740 Cty Rd 89; 48°42′15″N 94°24′28″W	Clementson vicinity	One-room schoolhouse in operation 1909–1928, attesting to Koochiching County's efforts to bring a standard education to areas too sparsely populated to support independent school districts.

== Former listings ==
	Name on the Register	Image	Date listed	Date removed	Location	City or town	Description
1	Scenic Hotel		January 27, 1983 (#83000907)	June 22, 1998	Main and 3rd Sts.	Northome	1921 hotel built to serve lumber workers and early tourists. Demolished by the county in 1996 after tax forfeiture and years of vacancy.

== See also ==
- List of National Historic Landmarks in Minnesota
- National Register of Historic Places listings in Minnesota
- National Register of Historic Places listings in Voyageurs National Park
