= Rauch, Minnesota =

Unincorporated community in Minnesota, United States

Rauch
- Unincorporated community
- Location within Minnesota Location within the United States
- Coordinates: 47°57′32″N 93°08′45″W
- Country: United States
- State: Minnesota
- County: Koochiching
- Elevation: 1,283 ft (391 m)
- Time zone: UTC-6 (Central (CST))
  - Summer (DST): UTC-5 (CDT)
- ZIP code: 55771
- Area code: 218
- GNIS feature ID: 654898

Rauch is an unincorporated community in Koochiching County, Minnesota, United States.

The community is located between Togo and Orr at the junction of County Road 75 (CR 75) and State Highway 65 (MN 65).

Rauch is located in the southeast corner of the county. The boundary line between Koochiching, Saint Louis, and Itasca counties is nearby. Rauch is located within ZIP code 55771 based in Orr.

== Geography ==
Rauch is located in South Koochiching Unorganized Territory.

Nearby places include Silverdale, Greaney, Celina, Togo, Nett Lake, and Orr. Rauch is located 24 miles southwest of Orr; and 14 miles north of Togo. Rauch is 28 miles northwest of Cook; and 67 miles south of International Falls.

The Little Fork River flows through the community. The Willow River, a tributary of the Little Fork River, is also in the vicinity.
