= Nett Lake, Minnesota =

Nett Lake, Minnesota may refer to the following places in Minnesota:

- Nett Lake, Koochiching County, Minnesota, an unorganized territory
- Nett Lake, St. Louis County, Minnesota, an unorganized territory
- Nett Lake (CDP), Minnesota

It is part of the Bois Forte Indian Reservation
