= The Net =

The Net may refer to:

== Film ==
- The Net (1916 film) by George Foster Platt
- The Net (1923 film), a film by J. Gordon Edwards
- The Net (1953 film), a film starring James Donald
- The Net (1975 film), a film starring Klaus Kinski
- The Net (1995 film), a film starring Sandra Bullock
- The Net (2016 film), a South Korean film by Kim Ki-duk

== Television ==
- The Net (British TV series), a 1994 educational show focusing on emerging technologies
- The Net (American TV series), a 1998 drama series based on the 1995 film

== Other uses ==
- The Net (novel), a 1952 novel by John Pudney
- The Net (album), a 1983 album by the Little River Band
- The Net (substance), an alloy of copper and antimony
- The Net (building), a future high-rise building in Seattle, Washington, U.S.
- Internet or the Net
- Network Associates Coliseum or the Net, now Oakland–Alameda County Coliseum, a multi-purpose stadium in California

== See also ==
- Net (disambiguation)
- NET (disambiguation)
- NETS (disambiguation)
- .net (disambiguation)
