= KBFT =

KBFT may refer to:

- KBFT (FM), a radio station (89.9 FM) licensed to serve Nett Lake, Minnesota, United States
- KBFT (TV), a student television station in Sacramento, California, United States
