= Bois Forte Band of Chippewa =

Ojibwe Band located in northern Minnesota, US

Zagaakwaandagowininiwag

Total population
- 3,052 (2007)

Regions with significant populations
- United States (Minnesota)

Languages
- English, Ojibwe

Related ethnic groups
- Minnesota Chippewa Tribe, other Ojibwe people

The Bois Forte Band of Chippewa (Ojibwe: Zagaakwaandagowininiwag, "Men of the Thick Fir-woods") are a federally recognized Ojibwe Band located in northern Minnesota, along the border between the United States and Canada. Their landbase is the Bois Forte Indian Reservation, of which the Nett Lake Indian Reservation holdings are the largest of their reservation holdings. The Bois Forte Band is one of six constituent members of the Minnesota Chippewa Tribe. In 2007, the Minnesota Chippewa Tribe reported having 3,052 people enrolled through the Bois Forte (Nett Lake) Reservation as members of the Bois Forte Band.

== History ==
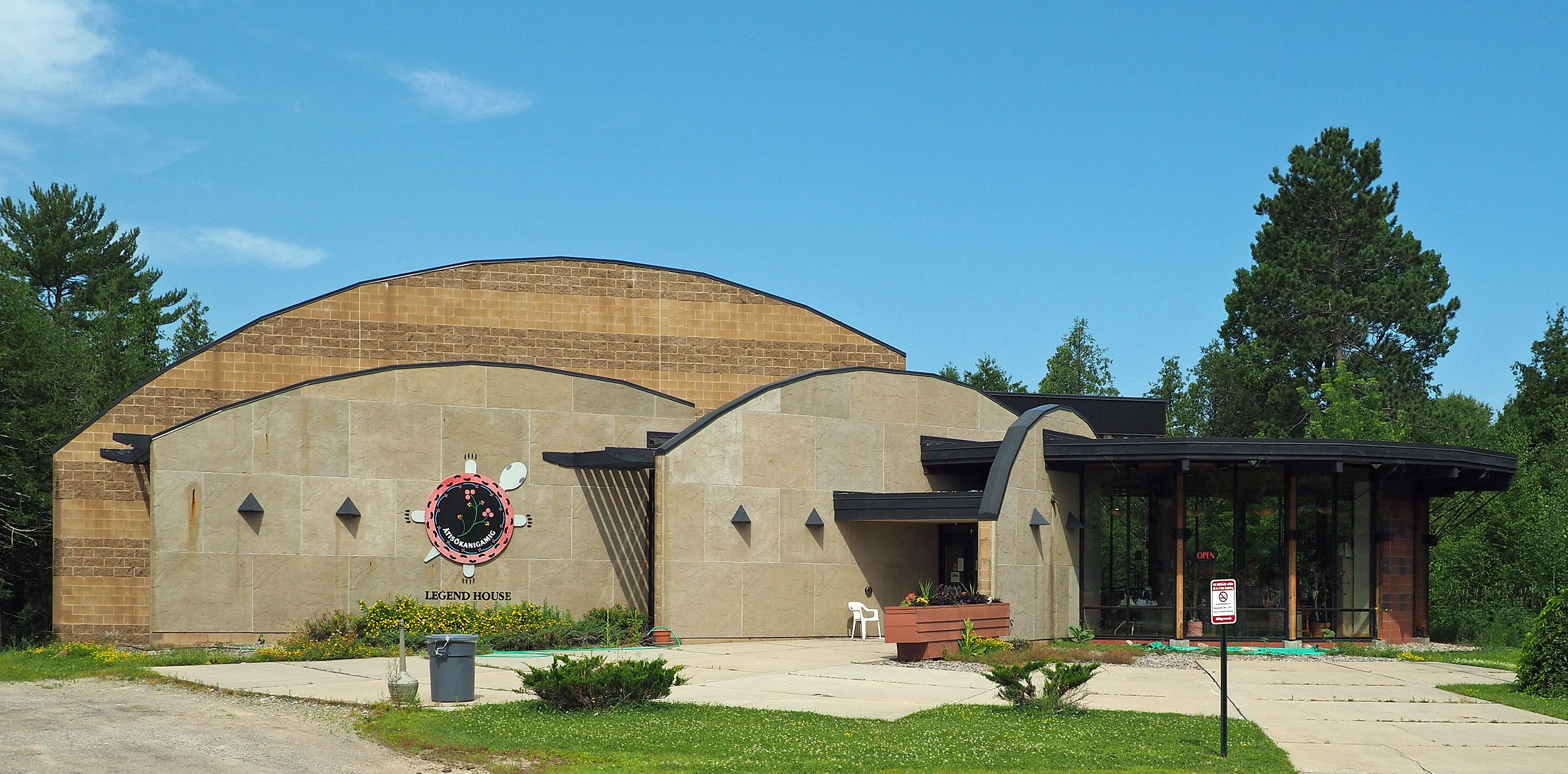
Bois Forte Heritage Center & Cultural Museum in Tower, MN

The Bois Forte Band is an amalgamation of three separate groups, of which the Zagwaandagaawininiwag was the largest component, also known on some documents as Zoongaatigwitoonag ("Strong-wooded Ones", reflected in French as "Les Songatikitons"). Others now considered part of the Bois Forte Band includes the Lake Vermilion Band of Lake Superior Chippewa and the southern half of the Little Forks Band of Rainy River Saulteaux. Due to their very peaceful existence, Warren reports they were called the "Rabbit" (Ojibwe: Waabooz). Under the Treaty of Paris (1783) and the Webster-Ashburton Treaty (1842), the Little Forks Band of Rainy River Saulteaux were divided in half, with the southern half living about the Little Fork River being in the United States. The Lake Vermilion Band went into a treaty relationship with the United States in 1854. In 1866, the Bois Forte Band entered into a treaty with the United States, which also began the amalgamation process of these three historical bands into a single Band of today.

== Ethnonyms ==
The Bois Forte Band are known in Ojibwe as Zagaakwaandagowininiwag, "Men of the Thick Fir-woods"; commonly but erroneously shortened to Zagwaandagaawininiwag, "Men of the Thick Boughs". They are named after their location of thick conifer forest of northern Minnesota, Handbook of North American Indians record other variations of their names.

- Boise Forte — Indian Affairs Report, 332, 1873.
- Bois Forts — Warren (1852) in Minnesota Historical Society Collections, V, 85, 1885.
- Hardwoods — Warren (1852) in Minnesota Historical Society Collections, V, 85, 1885.
- Sagantwaga-wininiwak — Gatschet, Ojibwa Manuscript. BAE 1882
- Sagwandagawinini — Baraga, English-Otchipwe Dictionary, 109, 1879
- Sạgwāndạgāwininiwạg — William Jones, information, 1905.
- Sakâwiyiniw — Baraga, English-Otchipwe Dictionary, 109, 1879
- Sug-wau-dag-ah-win-in-e-wug — Warren (1852) in Minnesota Historical Society Collections, V, 85, 1885.
- Sug-waun-dug-ah-win-ine-wug — Warren in Schoolcraft, Indian Tribes, II, 139, 1852
- Sug-wun-dug-ah-win-in-e-wug — Ramsey in Indian Affairs Report, 90, 1850.
- Thick Woodsmen — Warren in Schoolcraft, Indian Tribes, II, 139, 1852
- Waub-ose — Warren (1852) in Minnesota Historical Society Collections, V, 86, 1885.

== Band-owned businesses and enterprises ==
The band operates the Nett Lake Wild Rice cooperative, owns and operates the Powerain carwash products, Fortune Bay Resort and Casino, and KBFT FM in Nett Lake, Minnesota. It established a credit union, Northern Eagle Federal Credit Union, in 2013.

== Notable Bois Forte citizens ==
- Joe Geshick, artist
- Linda LeGarde Grover, University of Minnesota, Duluth, American Indian Studies professor and Duluth Budgeteer columnist, author of The Dance Boots (2010)
- Keith Secola (b. 1957), musician, singer
