= Angora Township, St. Louis County, Minnesota =

Angora Township, Minnesota
- Township
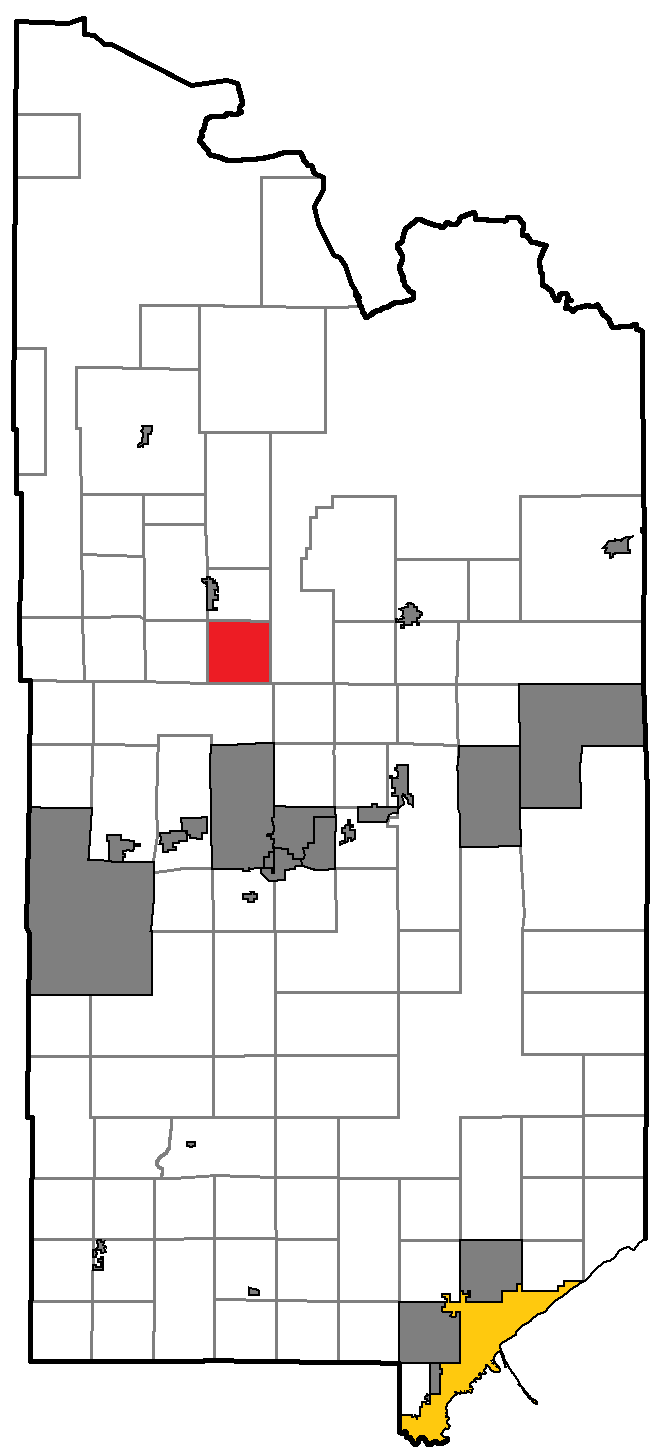
- Location of Angora Township within St. Louis County, Minnesota
- Coordinates: 47°45′35″N 92°38′33″W
- Country: United States
- State: Minnesota
- County: Saint Louis

Area
  - Total: 36.4 sq mi (94.2 km^{2})
  - Land: 36.3 sq mi (94.0 km^{2})
  - Water: 0.12 sq mi (0.3 km^{2})
- Elevation: 1,368 ft (417 m)

Population (2020)
  - Total: 223
  - Density: 6.14/sq mi (2.37/km^{2})
- Time zone: UTC-6 (Central (CST))
  - Summer (DST): UTC-5 (CDT)
- FIPS code: 27-01612
- GNIS feature ID: 0663435

Angora Township (/æŋˈɡɔːrə/ ang-GOR-ə) is a township in Saint Louis County, Minnesota, United States. The population was 223 at the 2020 census. Angora Township was named after Ankara, in Turkey.

U.S. Highway 53, State Highway 1 (MN 1), and Saint Louis County Road 22 are three of the main routes in the township. Highway 53 runs north–south through the township. Highway 1 runs east–west through the north–central and northeast portions of the township. County 22 runs east–west through the northwest part of the township.

The unincorporated communities of Angora, Idington, and Sherman Corner are located within Angora Township. Cook is nearby.

== Geography ==
According to the United States Census Bureau, the township has a total area of 36.4 square miles (94 km^{2}); 36.3 square miles (94 km^{2}) is land and 0.1 square miles (0.26 km^{2}), or 0.27%, is water.

The Rice River, a tributary of the Little Fork River, flows through Angora Township.

Sassas Creek flows through the northeast part of the township. Maki Creek flows through the east–central and southeast portions of the township. Puutio Creek flows through the southeast corner of the township. Johnson Creek briefly enters the southwest part of the township.

The southern and eastern portions of Angora Township are located within both the Superior National Forest and the Sturgeon River State Forest.

=== Adjacent townships and communities ===
The following are adjacent to Angora Township:

- Alango Township (west)
- Field Township (northwest)
- The city of Cook (north)
- Owens Township (north)
- Northeast Saint Louis Unorganized Territory (northeast)
- Pfeiffer Lake Unorganized Territory (east)
- Sandy Township (southeast)
- The unincorporated area of Britt (south-southeast)
- Sand Lake Unorganized Territory (south)
- Leander Lake Unorganized Territory (southwest)

=== Unincorporated communities ===
- Angora
- Idington
- Sherman Corner

Leander Road runs east–west along Angora Township's northern boundary line with adjacent Owens Township.

Ralph Road runs north–south along Angora Township's western boundary line with adjacent Alango Township. The roadway is in two separate disjointed sections.

Goodell Road runs east–west along Angora Township's southern boundary line with adjacent Sand Lake Unorganized Territory along the southwest edge of Angora Township.

Brown Road runs north–south along Angora Township's eastern boundary line with adjacent Pfeiffer Lake Unorganized Territory along the northeast and east–central edge of Angora Township.

== Demographics ==
As of the census of 2000, there were 277 people, 107 households, and 84 families residing in the township. The population density was 7.6 inhabitants per square mile (2.9/km^{2}). There were 139 housing units at an average density of 3.8 per square mile (1.5/km^{2}). The racial makeup of the township was 97.11% White and 2.89% Native American. Hispanic or Latino of any race were 0.72% of the population.

There were 107 households, out of which 34.6% had children under the age of 18 living with them, 71.0% were married couples living together, 5.6% had a female householder with no husband present, and 20.6% were non-families. 18.7% of all households were made up of individuals, and 3.7% had someone living alone who was 65 years of age or older. The average household size was 2.59 and the average family size was 2.93.

In the township the population was spread out, with 23.5% under the age of 18, 8.7% from 18 to 24, 30.0% from 25 to 44, 31.4% from 45 to 64, and 6.5% who were 65 years of age or older. The median age was 37 years. For every 100 females, there were 111.5 males. For every 100 females age 18 and over, there were 103.8 males.

The median income for a household in the township was $38,750, and the median income for a family was $43,214. Males had a median income of $39,250 versus $18,500 for females. The per capita income for the township was $15,279. None of the families and 4.4% of the population were living below the poverty line.
