= Koochiching State Forest =

State forest in Itasca, Koochiching, and St. Louis counties, Minnesota

- Location within Minnesota
- Interactive map of Koochiching State Forest

Geography
- Location: Itasca, Koochiching and Saint Louis counties, Minnesota, United States
- Coordinates: 48°09′05″N 93°34′58″W
- Elevation: 1,312 feet (400 m)
- Area: 567,985 acres (229,855 ha)

Administration
- Established: 1943
- Authority: Minnesota Department of Natural Resources
- Website: www.dnr.state.mn.us/state_forests/sft00028/index.html

Ecology
- WWF Classification: Western Great Lakes Forests
- EPA Classification: Northern Lakes and Forests
- Dominant tree species: Picea mariana, Thuja occidentalis, Larix laricina
- Fauna: White-tailed deer, gray wolf, American black bear, ruffed grouse

The Koochiching State Forest is a state forest located near International Falls in Itasca, Koochiching, and Saint Louis counties, Minnesota. The forest borders the Pine Island State Forest to the west, the Big Fork State Forest and George Washington State Forest to the south, the Nett Lake Indian Reservation and the Kabetogama State Forest to the east. A leg of the forest touches Rainy Lake to the north, which forms part of the international border with Ontario. Of the 565,500 acres (2,288 km^{2}), 344,300 acres (1,393 km^{2}) are managed by the Minnesota Department of Natural Resources, making it one of the largest forests in the Minnesota state system.

The forest's level terrain and abundance of lowland sites are due to the influence of Glacial Lake Agassiz in the area. Tree species predominantly include lowland species such as black spruce, northern whitecedar, and tamarack, although aspen and pine are present in the scattered upland sites.

== Recreation ==
Popular outdoor recreational activities are largely centered on the forest's access to Rainy Lake, the Little Fork River, and the Big Fork River, and include boating, canoeing, kayaking, and fishing. Picnicking and dispersed camping are possible throughout the forest. Trails are designated for hiking, snowmobiling, and 26.7 miles (43.0 km) set aside specifically for cross-country skiing.

== See also ==
- List of Minnesota state forests
