= Angora, Minnesota =

Angora
- Unincorporated community
- Location within Minnesota Location within the United States
- Coordinates: 47°46′30″N 92°38′03″W
- Country: United States
- State: Minnesota
- County: Saint Louis
- Township: Angora Township
- Elevation: 1,352 ft (412 m)

Population
  - Total: 40
- Time zone: UTC-6 (Central (CST))
  - Summer (DST): UTC-5 (CDT)
- ZIP code: 55703
- Area code: 218
- GNIS feature ID: 660660

Angora (/æŋˈɡɔːrə/ ang-GOR-ə) is an unincorporated community in Angora Township, Saint Louis County, Minnesota, United States.

The community is located six miles south of Cook at the intersection of State Highway 1 (MN 1) and Saint Louis County Road 430 (Burghardt Road). U.S. Highway 53 is nearby.

County Road 952 (Tee Road) is also in the area. The unincorporated community of Angora is located within Angora Township (population 249).

The communities of Sherman Corner and Idington are also nearby.

The Rice River, a tributary of the Little Fork River, flows through the community.

== History ==
A post office called Angora has been in operation since 1903. The community was named after Ankara, in Turkey. Angora was regarded as a railroad village in 1920. The population was 63 in 1920, and was 75 in 1940.
