= NET =

NET may refer to:

== Broadcast media ==
=== United States ===
- National Educational Television, the predecessor of the Public Broadcasting Service (PBS) in the United States
- National Empowerment Television, a politically conservative cable TV network, now defunct, also known as "America's Voice"
- Nebraska Educational Telecommunications, the former name of Nebraska Public Media, a state network of public radio and television stations in the U.S. state of Nebraska
- New Evangelization Television, a Christian-oriented TV channel based in New York, United States

=== Elsewhere ===
- NET (telecommunications), a Brazilian cable television operator
- MDTV (Indonesian TV network), an Indonesian television network formerly known as NET
- NET (Maltese TV channel), a Maltese television station
- NET 5, a Dutch television station
- Net 25, a Philippine television station
- New Hellenic Television, a Greek television network, currently known as ERT2 Sport
- Nihon Educational Television, former name of TV Asahi

== Science and technology ==
- Noise-equivalent target, a measurement of radiant intensity used in detection systems
- Noise-equivalent temperature, a measure of the sensitivity of a thermal-radiation detector
- Negative emission technologies, carbon dioxide removal

=== Medicine and chemistry ===
- N-Ethyltryptamine, a psychedelic drug
- Neuroendocrine tumor, a tumor occurring at the interface between the endocrine and nervous systems
- Neutrophil extracellular traps, networks of extracellular fibers that bind pathogens
- Norepinephrine transporter, a type of neurotransmitter transporter
- Norethisterone (norethindrone), a steroid contraceptive

== Other uses ==
- NET (brand), Taiwanese clothing brand
- Cloudflare, American internet services company (stock ticker)
- NCAA Evaluation Tool, a metric created in 2018 for use in the college basketball tournament selection process
- National Education Trust, a UK non-profit charity
- National Eligibility Test, an Indian entrance examination
- Native English-speaking Teacher, a scheme designed to employ overseas teachers in Hong Kong
- Netherlands, UNDP country code
- New Earth Time, a naming system for time on Earth
- New English Translation, a 2005 English translation of the Bible
- Nigerian Entertainment Today, a newspaper
- No Electronic Theft Act, a 1997 United States law extending the grounds for prosecution of copyright infringement
- Nottingham Express Transit, a tramway system in Nottingham, England
- Narrative exposure therapy, used for the treatment of post-traumatic stress disorder
- New England Transit, a bus simulation group centred around Boston on Roblox.

== See also ==
- Net (disambiguation)
- NETS (disambiguation)
- NETD (disambiguation)
- .net (disambiguation)
- The Net (disambiguation)
- National Educational Radio Network (NERN)
