= Grand Mound =

Grand Mound can refer to a place in the United States:

- Grand Mound, Iowa, a small city
- Grand Mound, Washington, a census-designated place
- Grand Mound (Minnesota), a prehistoric burial site
