= Alango =

Alango may refer to:

- Mildred Alango (born 1989), Kenyan taekwondo practitioner
- Alango Township, St. Louis County, Minnesota
