= Carpenter Township =

Carpenter Township may refer to the following townships in the United States:

- Carpenter Township, Jasper County, Indiana
- Carpenter Township, Itasca County, Minnesota
- Carpenter Township, Steele County, North Dakota
