= Nett (disambiguation) =

Nett is an administrative district in Pohnpei State, Federated States of Micronesia.

Nett or NETT may also refer to:

== People ==
- Carl Nett (born 1941), American politician
- Jason Nett (fl. 2010), Canadian composer
- Mane Nett (1948–2022), Chilean actress and manager
- Robert B. Nett (1922–2008), American army officer

== Other uses ==
- Northeast Texas Trail
- Nett (economics), a term used in calculations
- Nett Lake, Minnesota (disambiguation), several places

== See also ==
- Net (disambiguation)
