= Alango Township, St. Louis County, Minnesota =

Alango Township, Minnesota
- Township
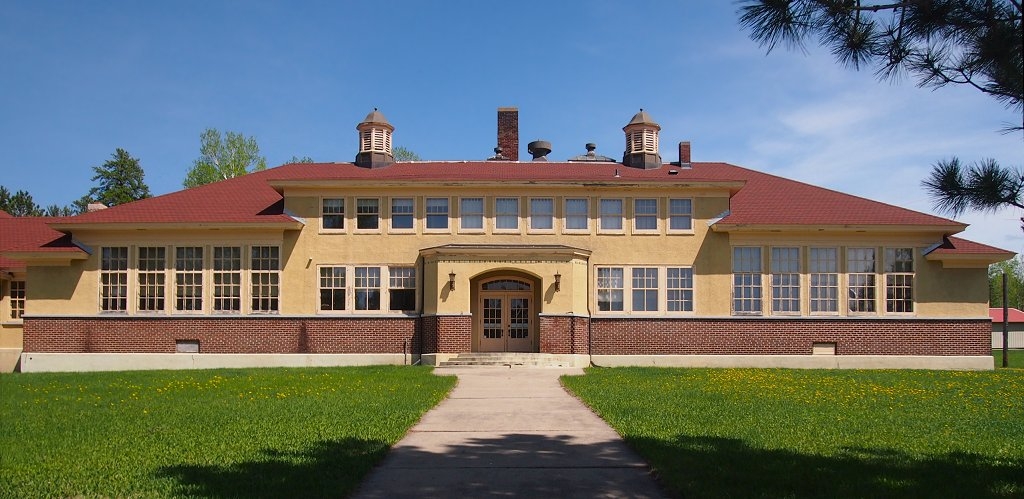
- The 1927 Alango School

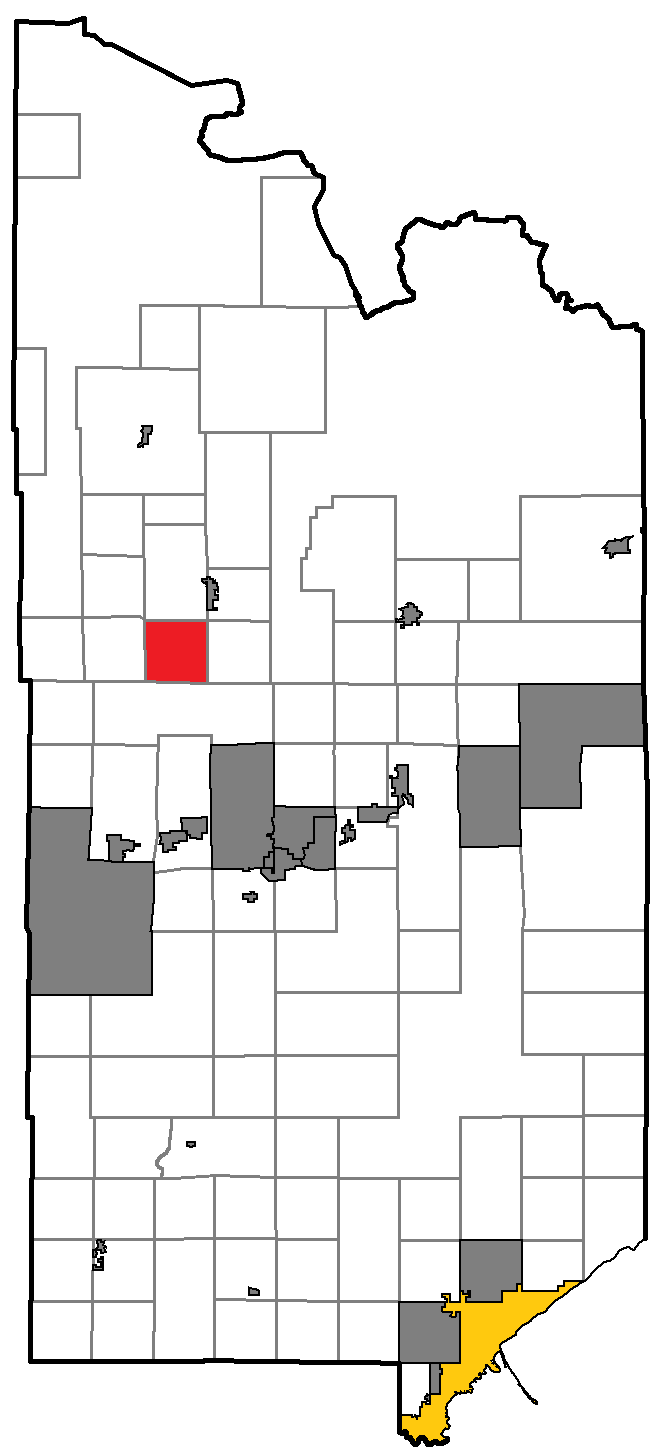
- Location of Alango Township within St. Louis County, Minnesota
- Coordinates: 47°45′52″N 92°46′1″W
- Country: United States
- State: Minnesota
- County: Saint Louis

Area
  - Total: 36.1 sq mi (93.6 km^{2})
  - Land: 36.1 sq mi (93.6 km^{2})
  - Water: 0 sq mi (0.0 km^{2})
- Elevation: 1,401 ft (427 m)

Population (2020)
  - Total: 272
  - Density: 7.53/sq mi (2.91/km^{2})
- Time zone: UTC-6 (Central (CST))
  - Summer (DST): UTC-5 (CDT)
- FIPS code: 27-00568
- GNIS feature ID: 0663394

Alango Township (/əˈlæŋɡoʊ/ ə-LANG-go) is a township in Saint Louis County, Minnesota, United States. The population was 272 at the 2020 census. Saint Louis County Roads 22 and 25 are two of the main routes in the township. Heino Road and Samuelson Road also pass through the township. Cook is nearby.

== Geography ==
According to the United States Census Bureau, the township has a total area of 36.2 square miles (94 km^{2}), all land.

Alango Creek flows through the northwest part of Alango Township. Paavola Creek briefly enters the south–central portion of the township. Gilmore Creek flows through the west–central and central portions of the township.

The southern 1/3 portion of Alango Township is located within the Superior National Forest in Saint Louis County.

The northwest, west–central, and southern portions of Alango Township are located within the Sturgeon River State Forest.

=== Adjacent townships and communities ===
The following are adjacent to Alango Township :

- Field Township (north)
- Owens Township (northeast)
- The city of Cook (northeast)
- Angora Township (east)
- The unincorporated community of Angora (east)
- The unincorporated community of Sherman Corner (east)
- Sand Lake Unorganized Territory (southeast)
- The unincorporated area of Britt (southeast)
- Leander Lake Unorganized Territory (south)
- Dark River Unorganized Territory (southwest)
- Sturgeon Township (west)
- The unincorporated community of Sturgeon (west)
- Linden Grove Township (northwest)
- The unincorporated community of Linden Grove (northwest)

Leander Road runs east–west along Alango Township's northern boundary line with adjacent Field Township.

Ralph Road runs north–south along Alango Township's eastern boundary line with adjacent Angora Township.

Goodell Road runs east–west along Alango Township's southern boundary line with adjacent Leander Lake Unorganized Territory.

Carpenter Road runs north–south along Alango Township's western boundary line with adjacent Sturgeon Township.

== Demographics ==
As of the census of 2000, there were 301 people, 121 households, and 80 families residing in the township. The population density was 8.3 inhabitants per square mile (3.2/km^{2}). There were 146 housing units at an average density of 4.0 per square mile (1.5/km^{2}). The racial makeup of the township was 95.02% White, 3.32% Native American, and 1.66% from two or more races. Hispanic or Latino of any race were 0.33% of the population. 31.8% were of Finnish, 18.0% Swedish, 13.3% German, 12.0% Norwegian, 6.9% Irish and 6.0% Polish ancestry according to Census 2000.

There were 121 households, out of which 30.6% had children under the age of 18 living with them, 55.4% were married couples living together, 5.0% had a female householder with no husband present, and 33.1% were non-families. 28.1% of all households were made up of individuals, and 8.3% had someone living alone who was 65 years of age or older. The average household size was 2.49 and the average family size was 3.01.

In the township the population was spread out, with 24.9% under the age of 18, 8.3% from 18 to 24, 25.9% from 25 to 44, 30.2% from 45 to 64, and 10.6% who were 65 years of age or older. The median age was 39 years. For every 100 females, there were 110.5 males. For every 100 females age 18 and over, there were 119.4 males.

The median income for a household in the township was $37,500, and the median income for a family was $53,542. Males had a median income of $41,875 versus $26,250 for females. The per capita income for the township was $16,399. About 5.5% of families and 11.8% of the population were below the poverty line, including 19.8% of those under the age of eighteen and 11.4% of those 65 or over.
