= KBFT (FM) =

Coordinates: 48°06′34″N 93°05′48″W

- Nett Lake, Minnesota; United States
- Broadcast area: Bois Forte Indian Reservation at Nett Lake
- Frequency: 89.9 MHz
- Branding: "Bois Forte Tribal Community Radio"

Programming
- Format: Community radio
- Affiliations: AMPERS

Ownership
- Owner: Bois Forte Tribal Council

History
- First air date: 2011
- Call sign meaning: Bois ForTe

Technical information
- Licensing authority: FCC
- Facility ID: 175109
- Class: A
- ERP: 1,000 watts
- HAAT: 38 meters (125 ft)

Links
- Public license information: Public file; LMS
- Webcast: Listen live
- Website: http://kbft.org/

KBFT 89.9 FM is a Community radio station, owned and operated by the Bois Forte Tribal Council. Licensed to Nett Lake, Minnesota, United States, the station serves the Bois Forte Indian Reservation at Nett Lake. It is funded in part by the Minnesota Arts and Cultural Heritage Fund.

== See also ==
- List of community radio stations in the United States
