= NETS =

Nets may refer to:

- The plural of any net
- Net curtains
- Brooklyn Nets, an NBA basketball team

NETS as an acronym may refer to:

- NETS (company), Network for Electronic Transfers, a cashless payment system in Singapore
- Neuroendocrine tumors
- Newborn Emergency Transport Service, an Australian medical service
- Negative Emission Technologies, removing greenhouse gases from the atmosphere
- New English Translation of the Septuagint, a translation of koine Greek scriptures
- New Europe Transmission System, a proposed joint natural gas transmission network
- Nazareth Evangelical Theological Seminary (NETS), an evangelical seminary in Israel
- Neutrophil extracellular traps
- Singh Program in Networked & Social Systems Engineering (NETS), a degree program offered by the University of Pennsylvania

== See also ==
- NET (disambiguation)

Nets
