= Carpenter Township, Itasca County, Minnesota =

Carpenter Township, Minnesota
- Township
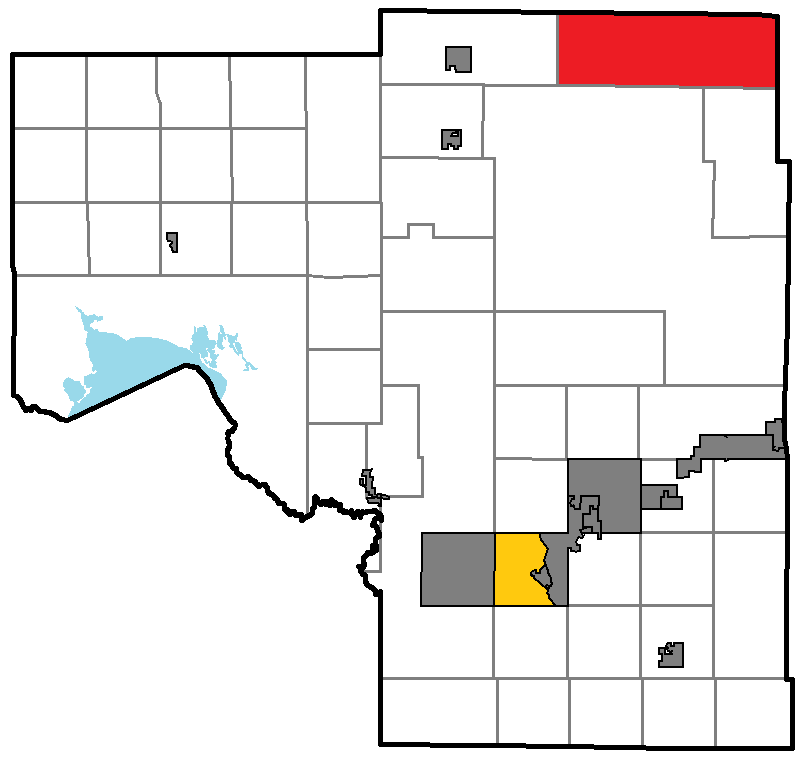
- Location of Carpenter Township, within Itasca County, Minnesota
- Coordinates: 47°50′31″N 93°17′46″W
- Country: United States
- State: Minnesota
- County: Itasca

Area
  - Total: 106.1 sq mi (274.8 km^{2})
  - Land: 100.9 sq mi (261.3 km^{2})
  - Water: 5.2 sq mi (13.4 km^{2})
- Elevation: 1,381 ft (421 m)

Population (2020)
  - Total: 154
  - Density: 1.53/sq mi (0.589/km^{2})
- Time zone: UTC-6 (Central (CST))
  - Summer (DST): UTC-5 (CDT)
- Postal code: 55723
- Area code: 218
- FIPS code: 27-10072
- GNIS feature ID: 0663755
- Website: https://www.carpentertownship.com/

Carpenter Township is a township in Itasca County, Minnesota, United States. The population was 154 at the 2020 census.

Carpenter Township was named for Seth Carpenter, an early settler.

State Highways 1 (MN 1) and 65 (MN 65) are two of the main routes in the township. The unincorporated community of Togo is located within Carpenter Township.

== Geography ==
According to the United States Census Bureau, the township has a total area of 106.1 square miles (275 km^{2}), of which 100.9 square miles (261 km^{2}) is land and 5.2 square miles (13 km^{2}), or 4.89%, is water.

A majority of the township is located within the George Washington State Forest of Itasca County.

The community of Togo, within Carpenter Township, is located 32 miles north of Nashwauk. Togo is also located 25 miles west of Cook; and 25 miles east of Effie.

== Demographics ==
As of the census of 2000, there were 208 people, 99 households, and 65 families residing in the township. The population density was 2.1 inhabitants per square mile (0.81/km^{2}). There were 266 housing units at an average density of 2.6 per square mile (1.0/km^{2}). The racial makeup of the township was 97.12% White, 1.92% Native American, and 0.96% from two or more races.

There were 99 households, out of which 9.1% had children under the age of 18 living with them, 61.6% were married couples living together, 2.0% had a female householder with no husband present, and 34.3% were non-families. 29.3% of all households were made up of individuals, and 16.2% had someone living alone who was 65 years of age or older. The average household size was 1.98 and the average family size was 2.38.

In the township the population was spread out, with 15.9% under the age of 18, 2.4% from 18 to 24, 22.6% from 25 to 44, 31.3% from 45 to 64, and 27.9% who were 65 years of age or older. The median age was 52 years. For every 100 females, there were 103.9 males. For every 100 females age 18 and over, there were 124.4 males.

The median income for a household in the township was $30,000, and the median income for a family was $32,917. Males had a median income of $30,536 versus $22,813 for females. The per capita income for the township was $17,860. About 3.8% of families and 11.6% of the population were below the poverty line, including none of those under the age of eighteen and 3.5% of those 65 or over.
