= Association of Baptist Churches in Israel =

Baptist Christian denomination

- Classification: Evangelical Christianity
- Theology: Baptist
- Associations: European Baptist Federation, Baptist World Alliance, Evangelical Alliance of Israel
- Headquarters: Nazareth, Israel
- Origin: 1965
- Congregations: 17
- Members: 900
- Official website: baptist.org.il

The Association of Baptist Churches in Israel (ABCI) is a Baptist Christian denomination in Israel. It is a member of the European Baptist Federation, the Baptist World Alliance and the Evangelical Alliance of Israel.

== History ==
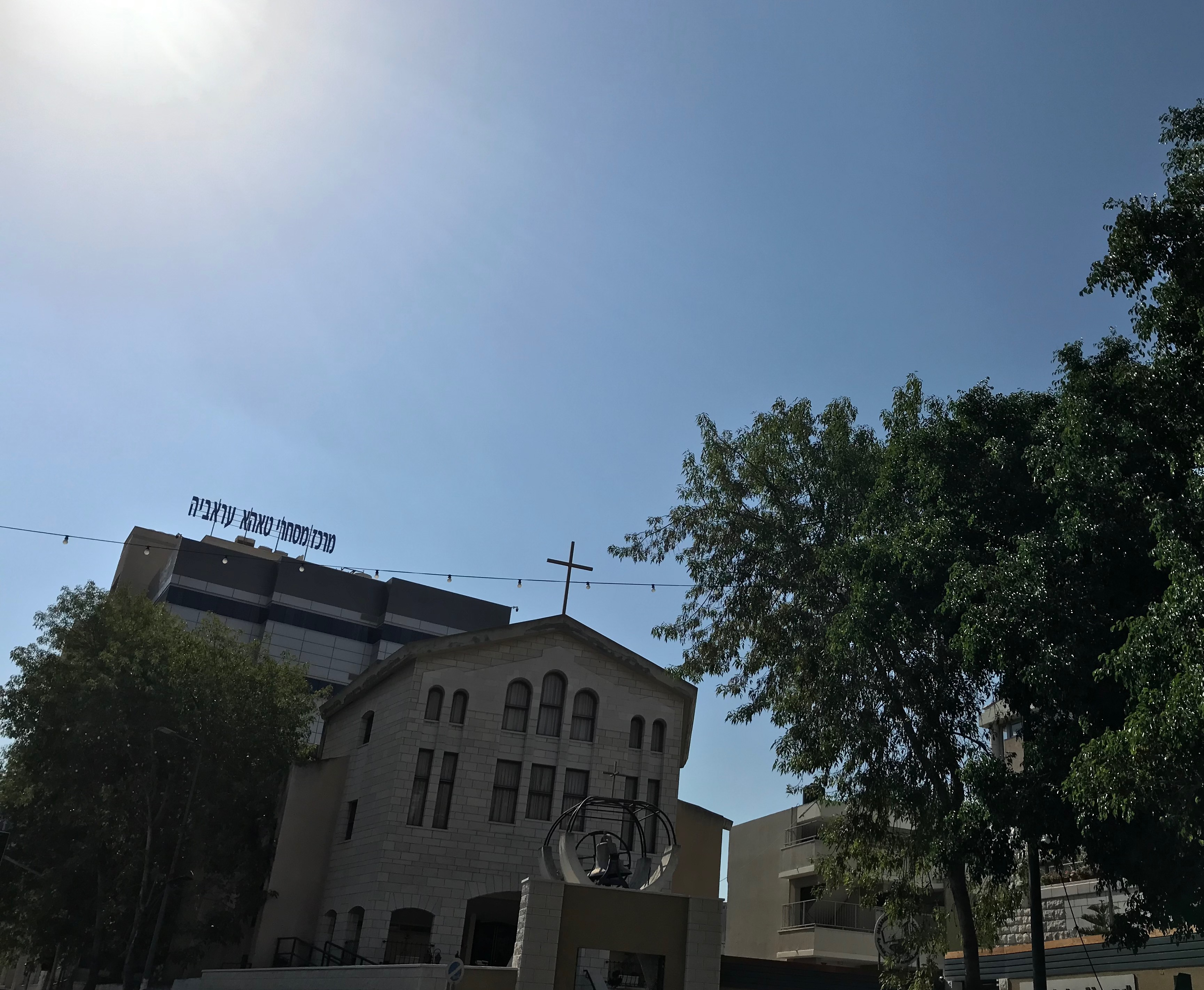
Evangelical Baptist Church Nazareth.

The Association has its origins in the founding of the first Baptist Church in Nazareth in 1911 by the Syrian Shukri Mosa. An American mission of the International Mission Board also established other churches in 1923. The Association was founded in 1965 by various Israeli Arab churches.

According to a census published by the association in 2023, it claimed 17 churches and 900 members.

== Beliefs ==
The Association has a Baptist confession of faith. It is a member of the Baptist World Alliance and the Convention of Evangelical Churches in Israel.

== Schools ==
The association is a partner of the Nazareth Baptist School founded in 1936, a K–12 school.

In 2007, it founded the Nazareth Centre for Christian Studies. In 2014, the Centre merged with the Galilee Bible college to establish the Nazareth Evangelical College.
