= Koochiching County Courthouse =

- U.S. National Register of Historic Places
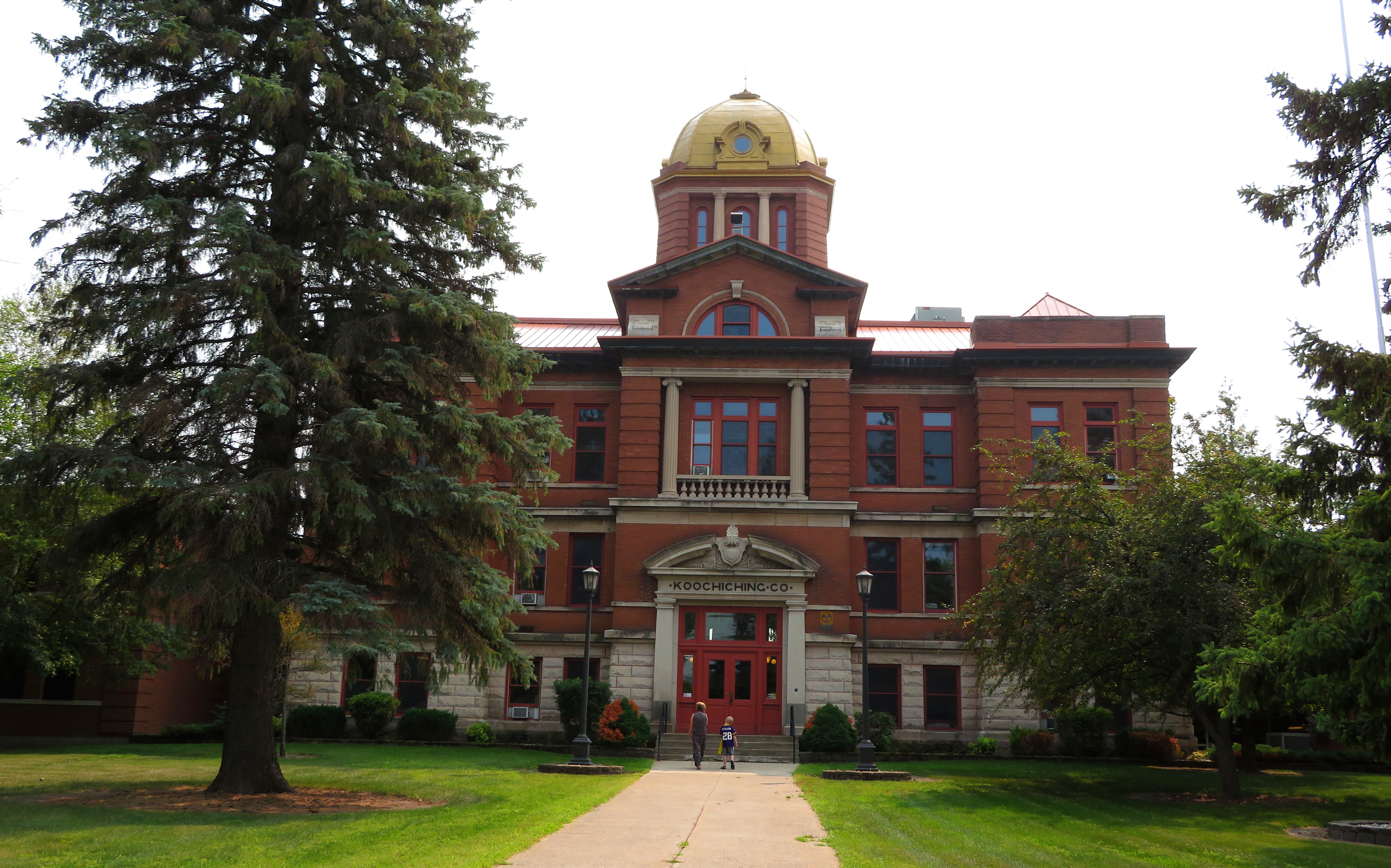

- Location within Minnesota Location within the United States
- Interactive map showing the location for Koochiching County Courthouse
- Location: 4th Street and 7th Avenue, Mahnomen
- Coordinates: 48.60114°N 93.41045°W
- Area: Less than one acre
- Built: 1909
- Architectural style: Classical Revival
- NRHP reference No.: 77000749
- Added to NRHP: September 9, 1977

The Koochiching County Courthouse is a Classical Revival brick building in International Falls, Minnesota, United States.

It was designed by Charles E. Bell and completed in 1909.

== See also ==
- National Register of Historic Places listings in Koochiching County, Minnesota
