= Finstad's Auto Marine Shop =

- U.S. National Register of Historic Places
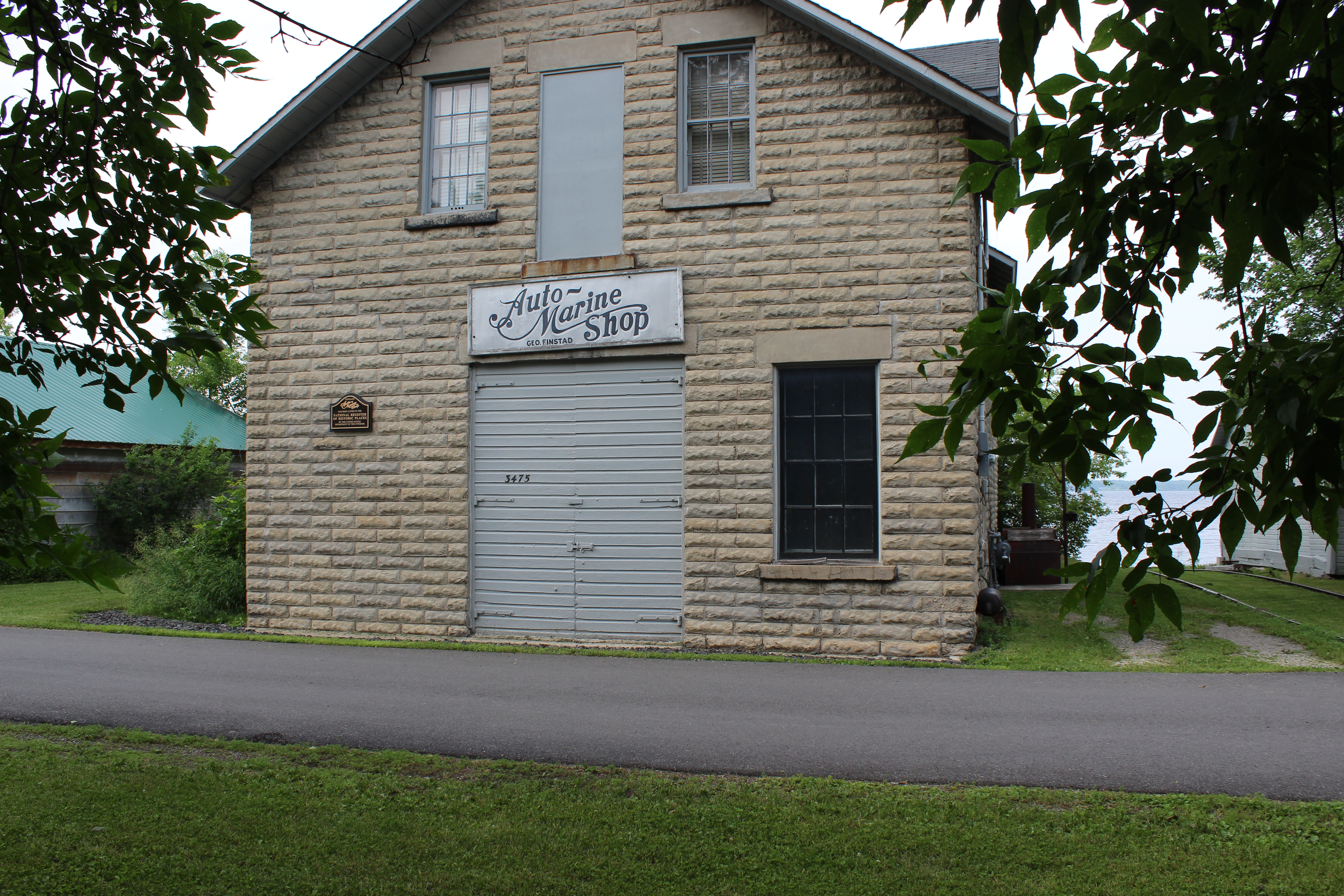
- Finstad's Auto Marine Shop from the south

- Location within Minnesota Location within the United States
- Location: 3475 Finstad Lane, Ranier, Minnesota
- Coordinates: 48°36′57″N 93°20′50.5″W
- Area: Less than one acre
- Built: 1911
- Architect: Jim DiOnne
- NRHP reference No.: 83000906
- Added to NRHP: January 27, 1983

Finstad's Auto Marine Shop is a former boat repair shop in Ranier, Minnesota, United States. It was built in 1911 on the south shore of Rainy Lake, and preserves its original belt-driven machinery. George Finstad acquired the shop in 1924 and continued to provide maintenance and storage services for fishermen, residents, and vacationers there for just over fifty years. The building was listed on the National Register of Historic Places in 1983 for its local significance in the themes of entertainment/recreation and transportation. It was nominated for its association with the early tourists and summer residents of the Rainy Lake region, a significant factor in Koochiching County's early-20th-century development.

== Description ==
Finstad's Auto Marine Shop is a gable-roofed, concrete-block building. Double doors at the front of the building allowed cars to be pulled inside for repairs. At the back of the building, another set of double doors provided access from the lake. The shop featured a belt-driven central machinery system that ran a drill, lathe, and other equipment. Living quarters were on the second floor.

== History ==
The shop was constructed in 1911 by Jim DiOnne, a gunmaker and automobile dealer. In 1922, DiOnne hired George Finstad, a World War I veteran and native of Buyck, Minnesota. Under DiOnne's guidance, Finstad fine-tuned his machinist and mechanical skills for two years before buying the business in partnership with his brother. He later bought out his brother's share. George Finstad discontinued the shop's work on guns and autos to focus on maintaining recreational and commercial fishing boats, as well as selling and repairing boat motors and parts. George's wife Clara handled the shop's bookkeeping.

In the years following World War I, outdoor recreation was becoming increasingly popular and accessible. As Minnesota's transportation systems improved and automobiles became more reliable and affordable, wilderness campers and anglers arrived in Ranier by car or on the Duluth, Winnipeg and Pacific Railway. They launched their boats and canoes from the town dock and headed to campsites on the islands and peninsulas scattered throughout American and Canadian waters. In lakes dotted with rocks and strewn with fallen logs, damage to boats and motors was a constant hazard. Finstad's lakeside shop offered convenient, reliable service.

Rainy Lake became a fashionable destination in the 1920s and 1930s as a summer escape from the heat and smog of industrial cities across the American Midwest. A number of wealthy tycoons built imposing homes on the lake's islands. The social scene included Minneapolis grain moguls from the Pillsbury and Bell families; William Hapgood, owner of an Indiana cannery; and Major Horace Roberts, president of the Gordon–Van Tine Company in Davenport, Iowa, manufacturer of prefabricated homes. Finstad tended to their Chris-Crafts, Hacker-Crafts, and Gar Woods, the wooden speedboats of the era. Larger yachts also sailed Rainy Lake, including the James Ford Bell family's 44-foot (13 m) cruiser the Loafden, and Major Roberts' 50-foot (15 m) Virginia.

The arrival of any new yacht was a civic spectacle in Ranier, with crowds gathering at Finstad's shop to watch the launch. Boats arrived by truck or train, packed in custom-made cradles that protected them during shipping. Finstad loaded the yachts onto his "marine railroad", a track that shuttled the boats down a two-block slope into Rainy Lake.

Each fall Finstad used the marine railway to pull the yachts out of the water. He wrapped them with canvas tarps and stored them on the cradles that had protected them during shipping. Over the winter he repaired, resealed, and readied the boats for relaunching in the spring.

Rainy Lake's summer population was lively throughout the 1920s and 1930s, but during World War II the lake grew quiet. Finstad spent the war years maintaining and repairing equipment at the paper mill in nearby International Falls.

Following the war, Rainy Lake's wealthy families gradually withdrew from their summer homes. Outhouses and lake-drawn water systems seemed uncomfortably rustic in a prosperous convenience society. Many of the elegant yachts were sold or transported to lakes closer to the Twin Cities or permanent moors in southern states. The Virginia and the Loafden were both moved to Lake Minnetonka.

Aluminum and fiberglass boats and canoes gained popularity in the post-war years. The new boats were less expensive and easier to transport and store at home than wooden boats. Although Finstad's winter storage business declined, his Johnson Outboard Motors franchise covered a large territory between Rainy Lake and Kabetogama Lake and provided a steady income. He continued selling and repairing motors and fixing boats until his death in 1975. Clara Finstad kept the shop running until 1992.

== See also ==
- National Register of Historic Places listings in Koochiching County, Minnesota
