= Orr Regional Airport =

- IATA: none; ICAO: KORB; FAA LID: ORB

Summary
- Airport type: Public
- Owner: City of Orr
- Serves: Orr, Minnesota
- Location: Leiding Township, St. Louis County, Minnesota
- Elevation AMSL: 1,311 ft / 400 m
- Coordinates: 48°00′57″N 092°51′22″W

Map
- Location of airport in Minnesota / United States ORB (the United States)

Runways
| Direction | Length | | Surface |
| Direction | ft | m | Surface |
|---|---|---|---|
| 13/31 | 4,000 | 1,220 | Asphalt |

Statistics
- Aircraft operations (2014): 2,500
- Based aircraft (2017): 10
- Sources: Minnesota DOT, FAA

Orr Regional Airport (ICAO: KORB, FAA LID: ORB) is a city-owned public-use airport located three nautical miles (6 km) southwest of the central business district of Orr, a city in Saint Louis County, Minnesota, United States.

Although most U.S. airports use the same three-letter location identifier for the FAA and IATA, this airport is assigned ORB by the FAA but has no designation from the IATA (which assigned ORB to Örebro Airport in Örebro, Sweden).

== Facilities and aircraft ==
Orr Regional Airport covers an area of 332 acres (134 ha) at an elevation of 1,311 feet (400 m) above mean sea level. It has one runway designated 13/31 with an asphalt surface measuring 4,000 by 75 feet (1,220 x 23 m).

For the 12-month period ending May 31, 2014, the airport had 2,500 general aviation aircraft operations; an average of 208 per month. In March 2017, there were 10 aircraft based at this airport; all 10 single-engine.

== See also ==
- List of airports in Minnesota
