= Minnesota Historical and Cultural Heritage Grants =

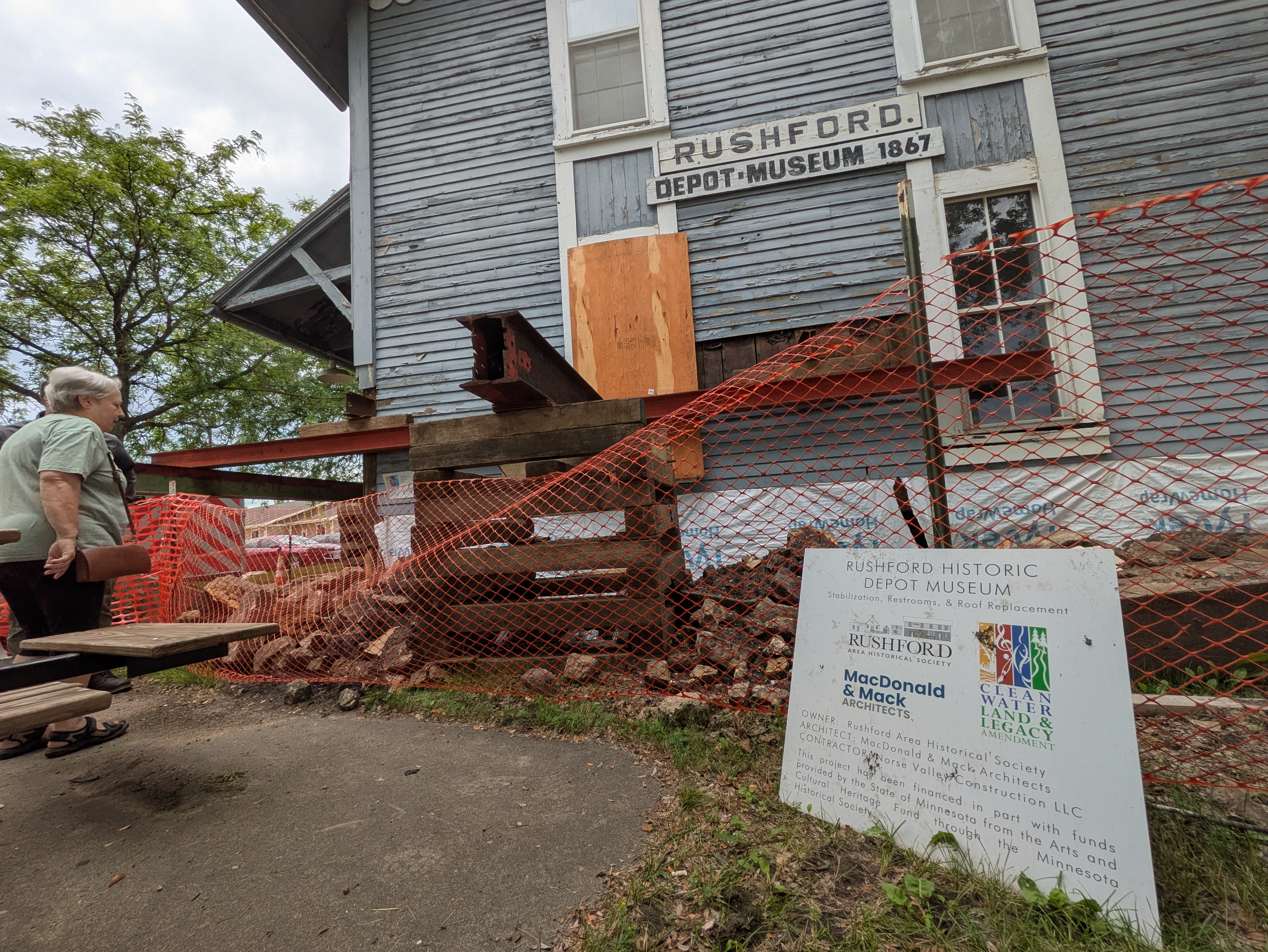
Historic Rushford Depot undergoing restoration using grant fund.

The Minnesota Historical and Cultural Heritage Grants is a grant program created with funds appropriated from the Minnesota Arts and Cultural Heritage Fund, and administered by the Minnesota Historical Society. This program provides grants to projects in the state of Minnesota focused on preserving Minnesota's history and cultural heritage.

== History ==
On November 4, 2008, Minnesotans approved through referendum the Clean Water, Land, and Legacy Amendment to add Article XI to the Minnesota State Constitution. The amendment raised the state's sales and use taxes 0.375% to fund programs meant to “restore, protect and enhance” wilderness lands, wildlife, water quality, state parks and trails, arts, arts education, arts access, and to preserve Minnesota's history and cultural heritage.

The Minnesota Historical Society's State Historic Preservation Office held public listening sessions November 2008 through January 2009 to gather input from the state's history community, composed of local history organizations, heritage preservation commissions, archaeologists, librarians, genealogists, and many more. Information gathered at these meetings helped to inform the Minnesota Legislature on the appropriations bill concerning the use of the constitutionally dedicated funds. This bill created the Arts and Cultural Heritage Fund and determined how money dedicated to the ACHF would be appropriated to the Minnesota Historical Society to establish the Minnesota Historical and Cultural Heritage Grants, as well as other state history programs and projects. On the basis of the facilitated feedback and legislation, the Minnesota Historical & Cultural Grants program was created, and introduced in October 2009.

== Distribution ==
Legislation directed that grants were to be given statewide to programs and projects conducted by local, county, or state historical organizations or activities that preserve significant historic and cultural resources. Funds distributed under this program must supplement current funding sources and must be applied for through a competitive grants process.

The first Small Grants cycle was in October, 2009, with Mid-Size and Large applications in November, 2009. The program received a total of 369 applications for FY 2010 with a total of 180 awarded. The Mid-Size and Large grants are awarded through the legislatively-mandated Historic Resources Advisory Committee, a review panel of 13 people representing historical, academic and library disciplines.
