= 2008 Minnesota Amendment 1 =

Minnesota Amendment 1
- November 4, 2008
- Clean Water, Land, and Legacy amendment

Results
Choice	Votes	%
Yes	1,635,046	58.89%
No	1,141,540	41.11%
Valid votes	2,776,586	95.08%
Invalid or blank votes	143,628	4.92%
Total votes	2,920,214	100.00%

2008 Minnesota Amendment 1, also known as the Clean Water, Land, and Legacy Amendment, was a legislatively referred constitutional amendment. The amendment amended Article IX section 14 of the Minnesota Constitution to allow for the creation of the Minnesota Arts and Cultural Heritage Fund, along with an outdoor heritage fund, a parks and trails fund, and a clean water fund. The amendment was accepted with 58.89% of the vote.

The bill containing the amendment, HF 2285, was introduced on March 21, 2007 by Tom Rukavina, David K. Dill, Tom Anzelc, Loren Solberg, and Tony Sertich. After various amendments (most of which were defeated), the bill passed the Minnesota House on May 19, 2007. On February 18, 2008, the Minnesota Senate passed the bill. On February 20, 2008, Minnesota Secretary of State Mark Ritchie received the bill and officially placed it 2008 ballot.

The question on the ballot read: "Shall the Minnesota Constitution be amended to dedicate funding to protect our drinking water sources; to protect, enhance, and restore our wetlands, prairies, forests, and fish, game, and wildlife habitat; to preserve our arts and cultural heritage; to support our parks and trails; and to protect, enhance, and restore our lakes, rivers, streams, and groundwater by increasing the sales and use tax rate beginning July 1, 2009, by three-eighths of one percent on taxable sales until the year 2034?"

== Support and opposition ==
The amendment was supported by Bud Grant and Ken Martin. Some Republicans, including Dennis Frederickson, were in support of the amendment. Frederickson accurately predicted the amendment would be accepted with 58% of the vote. Another Republican, Tony Cornish, voted in favor of the amendment after a failed attempt to amend it to use funds only from existing sales taxes. The Minnesota Vikings gave support to the amendment on behalf of hunters, and habitat restoration.

The Taxpayers League of Minnesota opposed the amendment. Republican Rod Grams opposed the amendment, believing it gave more power to special interest groups, and would not have any serious consequences for culture or on the environment. The Douglas County Farm Bureau opposed the measure, disapproving of tax increases in the constitution. The Minnesota Chamber of Commerce opposed the amendment, believing it to be poor budget policy.

== Results ==
Choice	Votes	%
For	1,635,046	58.89
Against	1,141,540	41.11
Total	2,776,586	100.00
Blank votes	143,628	4.92

== See also ==
- Minnesota Historical and Cultural Heritage Grants
