= Minnesota Arts and Cultural Heritage Fund =

The Minnesota Arts and Cultural Heritage Fund (ACHF) is an institution in Minnesota to give funding to organizations, events, and projects of artistic, historical, and cultural significance. It is a state constitutional organization, created following the passage of the 2008 Minnesota Amendment 1 ballot question. It was created on July 1, 2009.

The ACHF is funded by the government of Minnesota, receiving 19.75% of 3/8th of 1% of all state sales tax in the state. The fund will last until 2034, at which point it will be granted an estimated $1.2 billion in funding.

The ACHF funds many non-profits in the state, including KBFT (FM), KQAL, Minnesota Public Radio, and the Southeastern Minnesota Arts Council.

As of 2026, out of the recipients of ACHF, 46.9% of grants have been given to the arts, 21.6% to historical societies, 7.6% to humanities, 3.4% to libraries, 2.2% to Indian affairs, 0.46% to agriculture, and 17.9% miscellaneous.

== See also ==
- Minnesota Historical and Cultural Heritage Grants
