= Idington, Minnesota =

Idington
- Unincorporated community
- Location within Minnesota Location within the United States
- Coordinates: 47°44′00″N 92°39′07″W
- Country: United States
- State: Minnesota
- County: Saint Louis
- Township: Angora Township
- Elevation: 1,352 ft (412 m)

Population
  - Total: 30
- Time zone: UTC-6 (Central (CST))
  - Summer (DST): UTC-5 (CDT)
- ZIP code: 55703
- Area code: 218
- GNIS feature ID: 661527

Idington is an unincorporated community in Angora Township, Saint Louis County, Minnesota, United States; located within the Sturgeon River State Forest.

The community is located between Cook and Virginia at the intersection of U.S. Highway 53 and Saint Louis County Road 936 (Hannula Road).

County Road 467 (Heino Road) is also in the area.
