= Sts. Peter and Paul Russian Orthodox Church =

Historic church in Minnesota, United States

- U.S. National Register of Historic Places
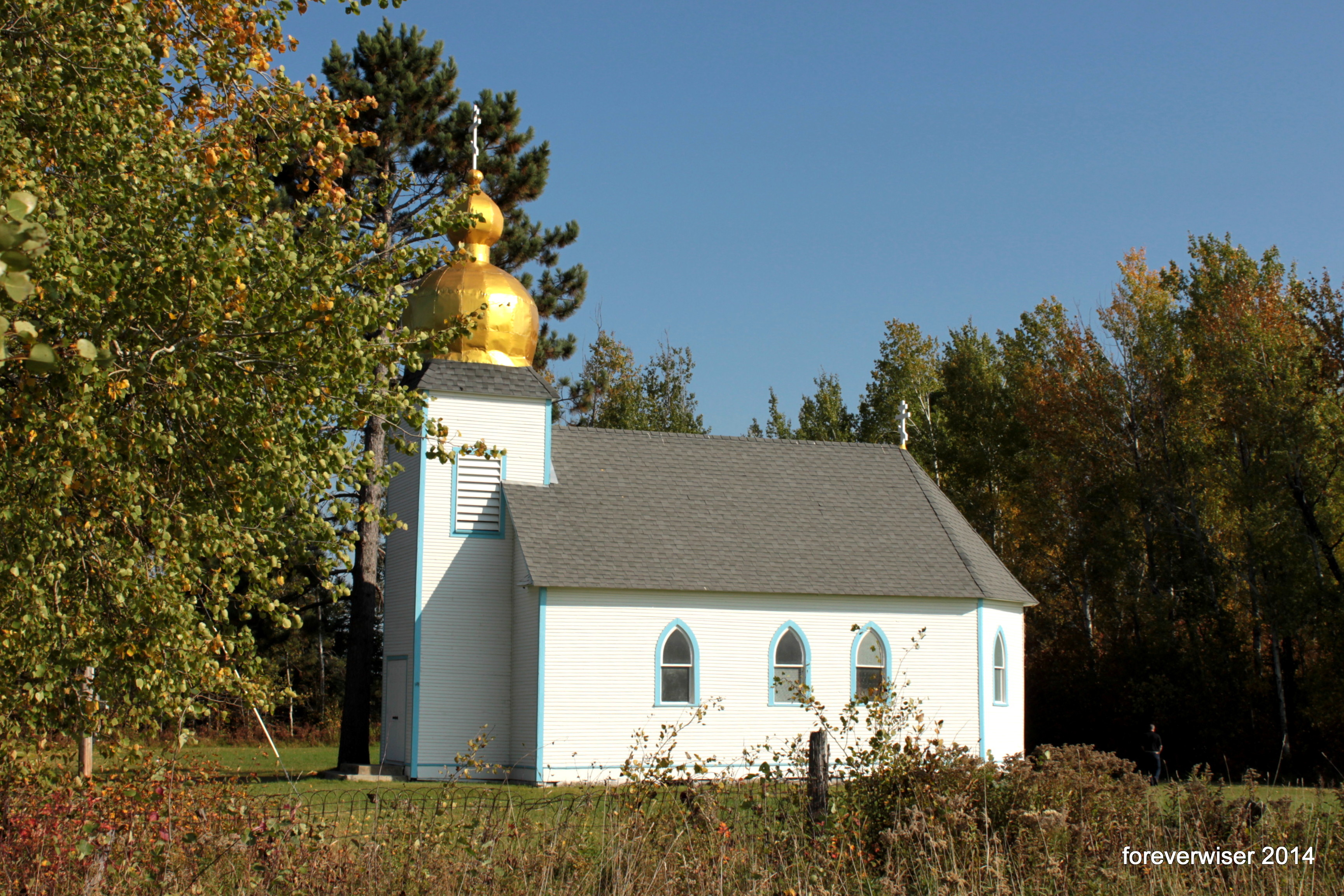
- Side of the church

- Location within Minnesota Location within the United States
- Nearest city: Bramble, Minnesota
- Coordinates: 47°54′23″N 93°10′0″W
- Area: 2 acres (0.81 ha)
- Built: 1915-18
- NRHP reference No.: 83000908
- Added to NRHP: January 27, 1983

Saints Peter and Paul Russian Orthodox Church is a historic church in Bramble, Minnesota, United States.

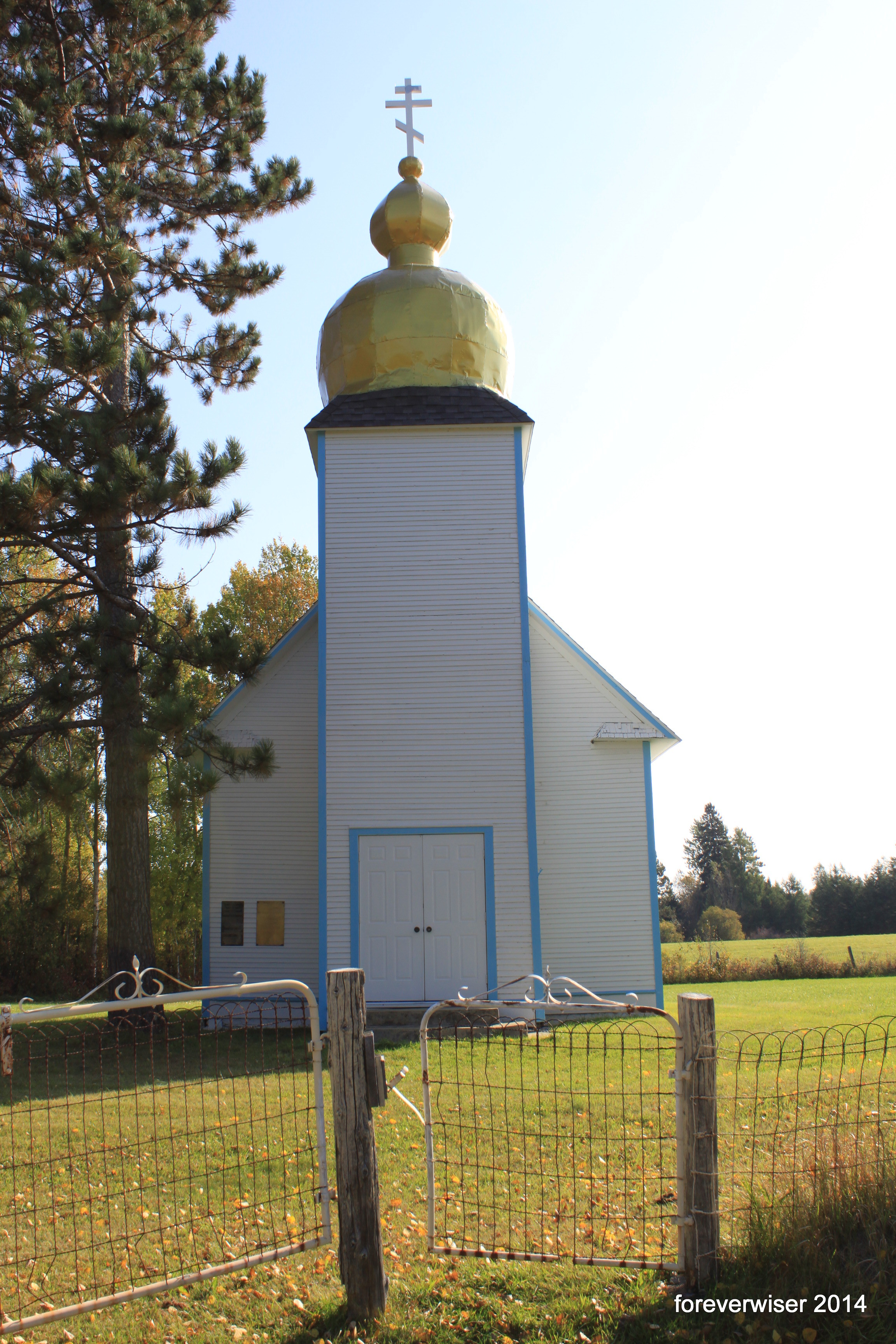
Church front and gate

The onion domed church was built in 1917-1918 by Russian immigrant homesteaders, who had come to the United States in search of a better life. The land was donated by William Lucachick, an area farmer.

The first Liturgy was celebrated by a Russian Orthodox priest from Chisholm. The interior contains an iconostasis installed in 1926. In keeping with Russian Orthodox tradition, there are no pews. Most of the congregation stands throughout the service, except for the elderly and infirm, for whom there are benches provided.

The active life of this parish was short-lived, as many of the people who had settled in the area for land left as they realized that the conditions of northern Minnesota only make for marginal farming. The church fell into disuse in the 1930s, but the early 1960s Paul Berg, an Episcopal priest in Grand Rapids, discovered the church and organized an effort to restore it. Father Paul contacted the office of the late Archbishop John (Garklāvs) of Chicago; it was then learned that there was no record of the parish's existence. The building was rededicated in 1968. The discovery of the church generated much interest, and the property subsequently was refurbished. Until the early 1980s, faithful from Minneapolis and Minnesota's northern Iron Range would gather at the church every July to celebrate the Feast of Saints Peter and Paul.

There is also a cemetery one quarter of a mile from the church on an acre of land which was donated by Andrew Soroka (Sorokie), one of the founders and builders of the parish.

It was added to the National Register of Historic Places in 1983.
