= Grand Mound (Minnesota) =

- U.S. National Register of Historic Places
- U.S. National Historic Landmark
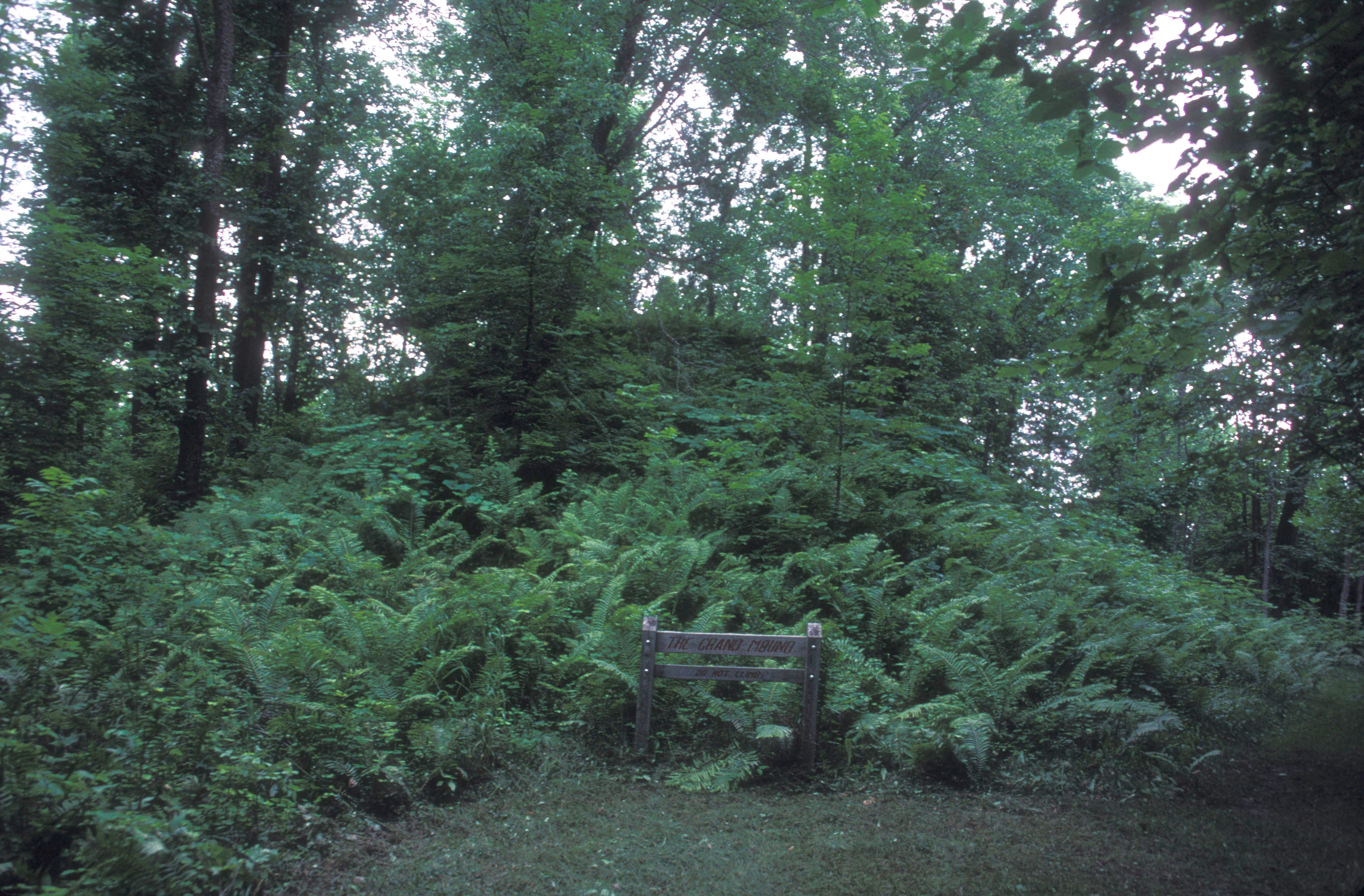

- Location within Minnesota Location within the United States
- Nearest city: International Falls, Minnesota
- Coordinates: 48°30′48″N 93°42′23.5″W
- Area: 15.8 acres (6.4 ha)
- NRHP reference No.: 11000565
- Added to NRHP: January 20, 1972

Grand Mound is a prehistoric burial site in Koochiching County, Minnesota, United States. It is the largest surviving prehistoric structure in the upper Midwest, dating back to 200 BCE. The site was listed as a National Historic Landmark on June 23, 2011.

The main burial mound measures 140 feet (43 m) in length and 100 feet (30 m) in width, about 25 feet (7.6 m) high, plus a 200 feet (61 m) tail measuring 12 feet (3.7 m) in width and 3 feet (0.91 m) in height. There are four other smaller earthworks at the site, closer in size to typical burial mounds around the Midwest. Besides the mound, the site contains a number of stratified deposits from villages dating to the Middle Woodland and Late Woodland periods. The main mound was for many years thought to be typical conical mound, but in the 21st century it was discovered to have a tail, and has been reclassified as an effigy mound, possibly resembling a muskrat. The mound is part of a larger series of interconnected archaeological sites that include seasonal camp locations and fishing areas.

The site once had a visitor center operated by the Minnesota Historical Society, opened in 1975. The visitor center was closed in 2003 and the site was closed to the public in 2007, amid concerns that having tourists viewing burial sites was inappropriate. Bill Keyes, the head of the Historical Society's historic sites and museums division, said, "What we heard from tribal elders was that this was like a cemetery, it was a burial ground, and that operating it as a tourist attraction was really not an appropriate way to go." Minnesota Historical Society continues to preserve the mounds and ensure they are accessible to Indigenous tribes while working towards the long-term goal of transferring the site to the tribes.

== See also ==
- List of National Historic Landmarks in Minnesota
- National Register of Historic Places listings in Koochiching County, Minnesota
