= Nazareth Evangelical College =

Evangelical Bible college in Nazareth, Israel

- Type: evangelical Bible college
- Established: 2014
- Affiliations: Evangelical Alliance Israel, Asia Theological Association
- Location: Nazareth, Israel
- Website: nazcol.org

Nazareth Evangelical College is an evangelical Bible college located in Nazareth, Israel. The language of instruction is Arabic. The college offers graduate and undergraduate degrees and provides a number of other education services to the local community.

== History ==
Nazareth Evangelical College has its origins in two Bible colleges: Galilee Bible College (GBC) and Nazareth Evangelical Theological Seminary (NETS). NETS was founded in 2007 by the Scottish missionary-scholar J. Bryson Arthur and his wife May, originally with the name 'Nazareth Center for Christian Studies. GBC was founded as an Israeli branch of the West Bank Bible college Bethlehem Bible College. All courses were taught in Arabic.

With the departure of NETS's primarily Western staff in 2013, NETS was handed over to entirely Arab leadership, was turned into a purely Arab-language institution, and was merged with GBC to become Nazareth Evangelical College, Israel's only theological seminary dedicated to serving the country's Arab evangelical minority in their own language. The merger took place in partnership in 2014 with the Association of Baptist Churches in Israel (ABCI), Bethlehem Bible College, and the Convention of Evangelical Churches in Israel (now called the Synod of Evangelical Churches in Israel).

== Academics and programs ==
Nazareth Evangelical College offers a BA in Biblical Studies and an MA in Leadership & Christian Ministry. Both degrees receive their accreditation through Bethlehem Bible College, which is accredited by the Middle East Association for Theological Education, the Asia Theological Association, and the Palestinian Authority.

NEC has also started an International Study Program, a series of courses and excursions designed to help develop relationships with international partners and share something about the unique Palestinian-Israeli evangelical context to visitors interested in deepening their understanding of the region. Currently on offer are a series of lectures on different facets of the local context and a combination of these lectures with a tour.

In addition to an extensive English-language theological library, NEC now hosts the largest Arabic-language theological library in the country.

== Approach ==
NEC subscribes to an evangelical statement of faith.
