= .net (disambiguation) =

.net is a top-level domain on the Internet.

.net or .NET may also refer to:

== Science and technology ==
=== Software frameworks ===
- .NET (formerly called .NET Core), an open-source cross platform software framework and successor to .NET Framework
- .NET Framework, a software framework by Microsoft
- .NET Standard, an implementation standard

=== Other ===
- .net filename extension for a network configuration/info file
- net (magazine), formerly .net magazine
- Microsoft .NET strategy, an unsuccessful marketing strategy of Microsoft from early 2000s
- Windows .NET Server, a development codename of Windows Server 2003

== See also ==
- Net (disambiguation)
- NET (disambiguation)
