= Willow River (Little Fork River tributary) =

Location
- Country: United States
- State: Minnesota
- Region: Koochiching County and St. Louis County, Minnesota

Physical characteristics
- Source
  - location: Gheen, Minnesota
  - coordinates: 47°56′4.7″N 92°47′34.62″W
- Mouth
  - location: Silverdale, Minnesota
  - coordinates: 47°57′52.73″N 93°7′12.62″W

Basin features
- River system: Little Fork River

The Willow River is a river of Minnesota. It rises in St. Louis County near Gheen and flows into the Little Fork River in Class County, near Silverdale. Willow River is part of the Hudson Bay drainage basin.

== See also ==
- List of rivers of Minnesota
