= Net =

Net or net may refer to:

- Net (device), a mesh of strings or ropes, to block passage of large items while letting-pass smaller and fluids
- Net (textile), a fabric made with loosely fused, looped or knotted yarns, that allows airflow

== Computing and electronics ==
- The Internet, or any computer network
- Net (command), a network management utility
- Part of a netlist, in circuit design

== Economics and finance ==
- Net (economics) (nett), the sum or difference of variables
- Net income (nett), income minus cost of goods sold, expenses and taxes

== Mathematics ==
- Net (mathematics), a filter-like topological generalization of a sequence
- Net, a linear system of divisors of dimension 2
- Net (polyhedron), an arrangement of polygons that can be folded up to form a polyhedron
- An incidence structure consisting of points and parallel classes of lines
- An operator algebra in local quantum field theory
- ε-net (computational geometry), a concept approximating a general sets with a collection of simpler subsets

== Other uses ==
- Net (film), a 2021 Indian thriller
- A golf score minus any handicap
- Net operation and amateur radio net, gatherings of radio operators on a set frequency.

== See also ==
- NET (disambiguation)
- Nett (disambiguation)
- Net and wall games, court-based sports with a dividing net
- .net (disambiguation)
- NETS (disambiguation)
- Network (disambiguation)
