= NETD =

NETD, NetD or netd can refer to:

- Negative electron-transfer dissociation
- Noise equivalent temperature difference
- NetDetector from Niksun
- Network device (NetD)
- netd.com a VOD service in Turkey by Doğan Media Group
