= Nett Lake, St. Louis County, Minnesota =

Unorganized territory in St. Louis County, Minnesota, United States

Coordinates: 48°06′40″N 93°05′39″W

Nett Lake, Minnesota Asabikonezaaga’iganing (Ojibwe)
- Unorganized territory
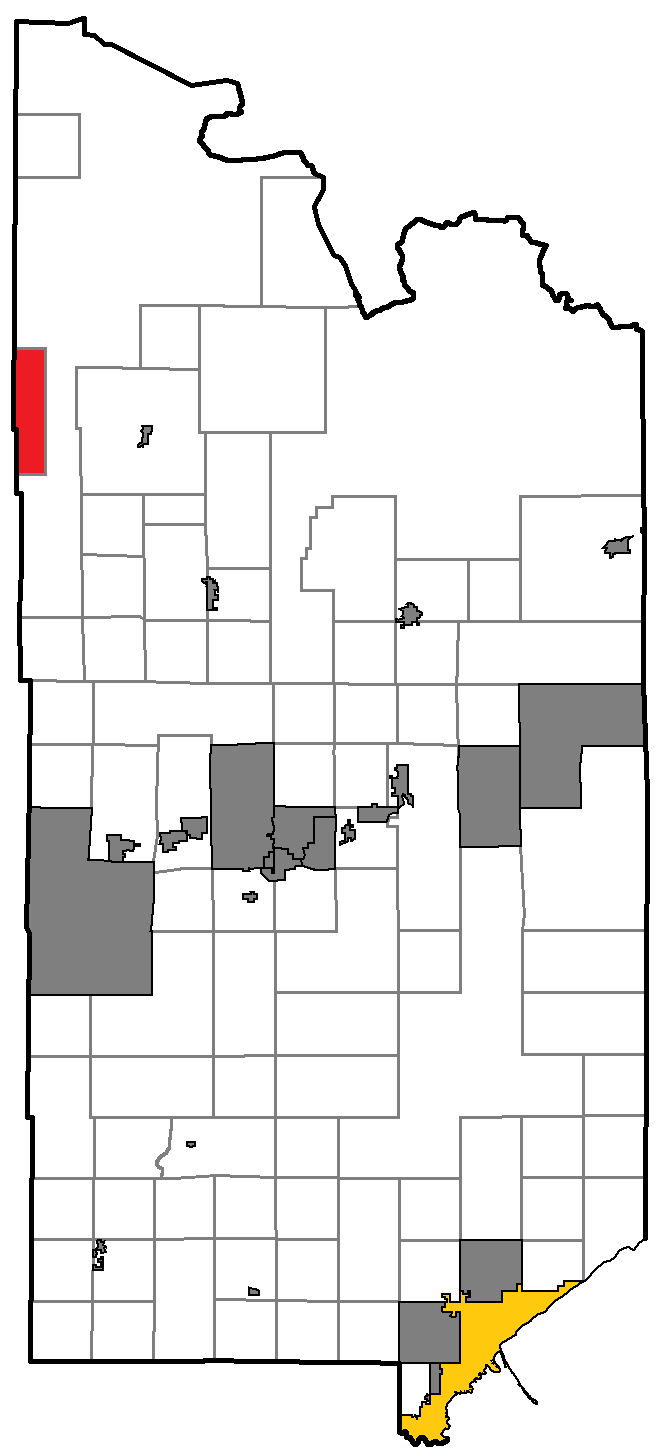
- Location of Nett Lake within St. Louis County, Minnesota
- Country: United States
- State: Minnesota
- County: St. Louis

Area
  - Total: 35.24 sq mi (91.3 km^{2})
  - Land: 31.50 sq mi (81.6 km^{2})
  - Water: 3.73 sq mi (9.7 km^{2})

Population (2020)
  - Total: 264
  - Density: 8.38/sq mi (3.24/km^{2})
- Time zone: UTC-6 (Central (CST))
  - Summer (DST): UTC-5 (CDT)
- Area code: 218

Nett Lake (Ojibwe: Asabikonezaaga’iganing) is an unorganized territory in Saint Louis County, Minnesota, United States. The population was 264 at the 2020 census.

== Geography ==
According to the United States Census Bureau, the unorganized territory has a total area of 35.5 square miles (91.8 km^{2}); 31.6 square miles (81.8 km^{2}) is land and 3.9 square miles (10.0 km^{2}) (10.92%) is water.

=== Census-designated place (CDP) ===
The following CDPs are located within Nett Lake Unorganized Territory :

- Nett Lake – Unincorporated community

== Demographics ==
At the 2000 United States census there were 272 people, 89 households, and 67 families living in the unorganized territory. The population density was 8.6 inhabitants per square mile (3.3/km^{2}). There were 103 housing units at an average density of 3.3 per square mile (1.3/km^{2}). The racial makeup of the unorganized territory was 2.94% White and 97.06% Native American. Hispanic or Latino of any race were 0.37%.

Of the 89 households 44.9% had children under the age of 18 living with them, 24.7% were married couples living together, 37.1% had a female householder with no husband present, and 23.6% were non-families. 20.2% of households were one person and 7.9% were one person aged 65 or older. The average household size was 3.06 and the average family size was 3.40.

The age distribution was 37.5% under the age of 18, 13.6% from 18 to 24, 24.6% from 25 to 44, 15.4% from 45 to 64, and 8.8% 65 or older. The median age was 24 years. For every 100 females, there were 100.0 males. For every 100 females age 18 and over, there were 95.4 males.

The median household income was $20,893 and the median family income was $28,125. Males had a median income of $20,000 versus $20,962 for females. The per capita income for the unorganized territory was $10,060. About 27.8% of families and 29.2% of the population were below the poverty line, including 38.6% of those under the age of eighteen and 21.9% of those sixty five or over.
