= Togo, Minnesota =

Unincorporated community in Minnesota, United States

Togo
- Unincorporated community
- Motto: Got to go to Togo!
- Location within Minnesota Location within the United States
- Coordinates: 47°49′17″N 93°09′22″W
- Country: United States
- State: Minnesota
- County: Itasca
- Township: Carpenter Township
- Elevation: 1,358 ft (414 m)
- Time zone: UTC-6 (Central (CST))
  - Summer (DST): UTC-5 (CDT)
- ZIP code: 55723
- Area code: 218
- GNIS feature ID: 653223

Togo is an unincorporated community in Carpenter Township, Itasca County, Minnesota, United States.

Togo is between Cook and Effie, at the junction of State Highways 1 (MN 1) and 65 (MN 65). County Road 22 is also in the vicinity.

Togo's motto is "Got to go to Togo!". The community is within the George Washington State Forest in Itasca County.

== Geography ==
Togo is 32 miles (51 kilometers) north of Nashwauk; 25 mi (40 km) west of Cook; and 25 mi (40 km) east of Effie.

Nearby places include Cook, Effie, Bear River, Rauch, and Celina. The boundary line between Itasca, Saint Louis, and Koochiching counties is near Togo. Bearville Township is also in the vicinity.

Togo is a remote area with a population of fewer than 15 inhabitants per square mile (6 inhabitants per square kilometer).

== Community ==
The town was named in honor of Japanese Admiral Tōgō Heihachirō. A post office had been established previously in the community. Togo was assigned a ZIP code. The ZIP code was retired, and the post office closed. Togo is now covered by zip code 55723, based in Cook.

The old post office and store is now a residential home.

Togo has two artesian water wells open to the public. One is at the crossroads of State Highways 1 and 65.

Togo has no grocery store or post office, but does have a modest private airport.

Togo connects to hundreds of miles of snowmobile trails. The Togo spur is near the junction (1 and 65), which directs sled traffic.

The old Togo Elementary School is home to a residence, and also has a small operating sawmill.

The Minnesota Department of Corrections operates an adult correctional facility at Togo. With an emphasis on chemical dependency and restorative justice. Established in 1955, it is commonly known as Thistledew Camp. The Minnesota Department of Corrections operates one of 2 men's Challenge Incarceration Program(s) which operates as a boot camp for adult male offenders. The facility has roughly 60 employees.

== Notable people ==
Notable residents include Jamie Nelson, four-time winner of the John Beargrease Dog Sled Race and four-time Iditarod Trail Sled Dog Race competitor. Reverend ThornBerg was one of the founders of the township. The ThornBerg family has been in the area since the 1900s.

== See also ==
- State Highway 1 (MN 1)
- State Highway 65 (MN 65)
