= Bois Forte Indian Reservation =

Reservation in Minnesota, USA

Bois Forte Indian Reservation is an Indian reservation formed for the Bois Forte Band of Chippewa (or Zagaakwaandagowininiwag (Men of the Thick Woods) in the Ojibwe language).

== Sections ==
Location of Bois Forte Indian Reservation

The reservation is composed of three sections in northern Minnesota, United States:

- The Nett Lake Indian Reservation (Ojibwe: Asabiikone-zaaga`iganiing, "At the Lake for Netting"), located at 48°05′31″N 93°11′12″W, is the primary reservation holding, containing the unincorporated community of Nett Lake, MN. The area of 162.872 sq mi (421.838 km^{2}) surrounds Nett Lake in Koochiching and St. Louis counties. This section comprises Nett Lake, Koochiching County plus Nett Lake, St. Louis County.
- The Deer Creek Indian Reservation, at 47°51′15″N 93°31′52″W, the second-largest section, comprises 35.109 sq mi (90.931 km^{2}) in Effie unorganized territory in Itasca County, just east of the city of Effie. This reservation was originally set aside for the Little Forks Band of Rainy River Saulteaux. Today, as the population have all relocated onto either the Nett Lake or to the Lake Vermilion Indian Reservation, this reservation is kept as a natural resources reserve for the band.
- The smallest section is the Lake Vermilion Indian Reservation (Ojibwe: Onamanii-zaaga'iganiing, "At the Lake with Red ochre"). It consists of 1.623 sq mi (4.205 km^{2}, or 1,039 acres) of land at 47°49′11″N 92°20′07″W in southeastern Greenwood Township on Lake Vermilion just west of the city of Tower in St. Louis County. Set aside by executive order, originally for the Lake Vermilion Band of Lake Superior Chippewa, today this reservation is one of the most accessible reservations for the Band. Consequently, the band operates Fortune Bay Resort Casino, The Wilderness at Fortune Bay golf course, and the Atisokanigamig (Legend House) Heritage Center out of this reservation.

There are additional scattered parcels less than 40 acres (16 ha) in size associated with the reservation. The reservation's total land area is 199.605 sq mi (516.974 km^{2}).

== Demographics ==
As of the census of 2020, the combined population of Bois Forte Reservation and Off-Reservation Trust Land was 984. The population density was 4.9 inhabitants per square mile (1.9/km^{2}). There were 541 housing units at an average density of 2.7 per square mile (1.0/km^{2}). The racial makeup of the reservation and off-reservation trust land was 69.9% Native American, 22.8% White, 0.1% Black or African American, and 7.2% from two or more races. Ethnically, the population was 2.2% Hispanic or Latino of any race.

Broken down by reservation subdivision, the Lake Vermilion segment had 402 people, the Nett Lake segment had 344 people, the Deer Creek segment had 163, and there were 75 people on other trust land parcels. The Bois Forte Indian Reservation is a member of the Minnesota Chippewa Tribe, who in July 2007, reported 3,052 people enrolled in the Bois Forte Band.

== History ==
The community first entered into a treaty with the United States in 1854 that set aside an undefined region around Lake Vermilion as a reservation. The regions at Nett Lake and Itasca County were officially established in an 1866 treaty, and the Lake Vermilion lands were defined in an 1881 executive order. Following the Nelson Act of 1889, the lands were surveyed and subdivided, but the U.S. federal government did not force tribe members to move to the White Earth Indian Reservation. Even so, allotment allowed timber companies and white settlers to acquire much of the land within the reservation boundaries. Only about 41% of the Nett Lake reservation was still tribally owned by 1981. In 2022, the Conservation Fund returned 28,089 acres (43.889 sq mi; 113.67 km^{2}) of forest land at Nett Lake to the Bois Forte Band.

50% of the reservation is wetland, and the 7,300 acre (30 km^{2}) Nett Lake is said to be the largest producer of wild rice in the United States.
