= Shermans Corner, Minnesota =

Shermans Corner
- Unincorporated community
- Location within Minnesota Location within the United States
- Coordinates: 47°46′45″N 92°39′23″W
- Country: United States
- State: Minnesota
- County: Saint Louis
- Township: Angora Township
- Elevation: 1,332 ft (406 m)

Population
  - Total: 20
- Time zone: UTC-6 (Central (CST))
  - Summer (DST): UTC-5 (CDT)
- Area code: 218
- GNIS feature ID: 662429

Shermans Corner is a populated place in Angora Township, Saint Louis County, Minnesota, United States.

It is located five miles south of Cook at the junction of U.S. Highway 53, Minnesota Highway 1, and Saint Louis County Road 22.

Sherman Corner is adjacent to Angora.
