= Rice River (Little Fork River tributary) =

Coordinates: 47°50′27″N 92°46′10″W

Location
- Country: United States

Physical characteristics
- Source
  - location: Minnesota

The Rice River is a river of Minnesota. It is a tributary of the Little Fork River.

== See also ==
- List of rivers of Minnesota
