= Nett Lake, Koochiching County, Minnesota =

Unorganized territory in Koochiching County, Minnesota, USA

Nett Lake, Minnesota Asabikonezaaga’iganing (Ojibwe)
- Unorganized territory
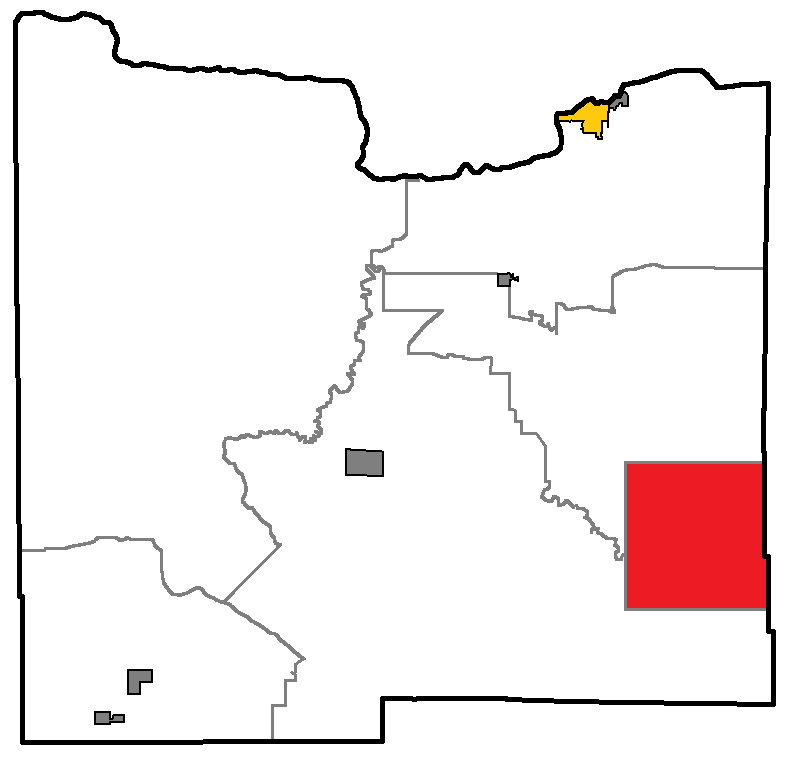
- Location of Nett Lake, within Koochiching County, Minnesota
- Coordinates: 48°05′06″N 93°14′02″W
- Country: United States
- State: Minnesota
- County: Koochiching

Area
  - Total: 139.15 sq mi (360.4 km^{2})
  - Land: 131.37 sq mi (340.2 km^{2})
  - Water: 7.78 sq mi (20.2 km^{2})

Population (2020)
  - Total: 80
  - Density: 0.61/sq mi (0.24/km^{2})
- Time zone: UTC-6 (Central (CST))
  - Summer (DST): UTC-5 (CDT)
- Area code: 218
- GNIS feature ID: 665083

Nett Lake (Ojibwe: Asabikonezaaga’iganing) is an unorganized territory in Koochiching County, Minnesota, United States. The population was 80 at the 2020 United States census.

== Geography ==
According to the United States Census Bureau, the unorganized territory has a total area of 139.1 square miles (360.3 km^{2}), of which 131.3 square miles (340.1 km^{2}) is land and 7.8 square miles (20.2 km^{2}) (5.59%) is water.

== Demographics ==
As of the census of 2000, there were 56 people, 17 households, and 14 families residing in the unorganized territory. The population density was 0.4 inhabitants per square mile (0.15/km^{2}). There were 19 housing units at an average density of 0.1 per square mile (0.039/km^{2}). The racial makeup of the unorganized territory was 12.50% White and 87.50% Native American. Hispanic or Latino of any race were 1.79% of the population.

There were 17 households, out of which 35.3% had children under the age of 18 living with them, 52.9% were married couples living together, 17.6% had a female householder with no husband present, and 17.6% were non-families. 17.6% of all households were made up of individuals, and none had someone living alone who was 65 years of age or older. The average household size was 3.29 and the average family size was 3.64.

In the unorganized territory the population was spread out, with 35.7% under the age of 18, 8.9% from 18 to 24, 23.2% from 25 to 44, 25.0% from 45 to 64, and 7.1% who were 65 years of age or older. The median age was 32 years. For every 100 females, there were 124.0 males. For every 100 females age 18 and over, there were 125.0 males.

The median income for a household in the unorganized territory was $17,500, and the median income for a family was $29,583. Males had a median income of $27,500 versus $40,625 for females. The per capita income for the unorganized territory was $9,309. There were 35.3% of families and 50.7% of the population living below the poverty line, including 61.5% of under eighteens and 33.3% of those over 64.
