= George Washington State Forest =

State Forest in Itasca, Koochiching, and St. Louis counties, Minnesota

- Location within Minnesota
- Interactive map of George Washington State Forest

Geography
- Location: Itasca, Koochiching and Saint Louis counties, Minnesota, United States
- Coordinates: 47°24′43″N 93°06′53″W
- Elevation: 1,401 feet (427 m)
- Area: 320,534 acres (129,716 ha)

Administration
- Established: 1931
- Authority: Minnesota DNR, Itasca County, private
- Website: www.dnr.state.mn.us/state_forests/sft00021/index.html

Ecology
- WWF Classification: Western Great Lakes Forests
- EPA Classification: Northern Lakes and Forests
- Disturbance: Wildfire

The George Washington State Forest is a state forest located in Itasca, Koochiching, and Saint Louis counties, Minnesota. The forest was established and named after George Washington in 1931, the first President of the United States, to commemorate the bicentennial of his birth. The forest borders the Chippewa National Forest and completely environs the Scenic State Park to the west, and borders the Sturgeon River State Forest and McCarthy Beach State Park to the east. The Taconite State Trail passes through the forest.

== History ==
Wildfires were common in the area from 1880 to 1930, when the area was logged and homesteaded. The last large fire occurred in 1933. The infrastructure of the forest was expanded largely during the Great Depression. Between 1933 and 1945 three Civilian Conservation Corps (CCC) camps were located in the forest and were responsible for campground construction, road-building, and soil and water conservation projects. The popularity and breadth of outdoor recreation in the forest are attributed to the work done by the CCC.

== Recreation ==
These outdoor recreational activities include hunting and picnicking. Surface water sports, such as boating, canoeing, kayaking, and fishing are popular on the numerous and prevalent small lakes and rivers. There are eight established campgrounds in the forest, including two horse campgrounds; additionally backcountry camping is an option. Trails include 60 miles (97 km) available for horseback riding, hiking, mountain biking, and Class I and II all-terrain vehicle use. Around 200 miles (320 km) are also designated in the wintertime for cross-country skiing and snowmobiling.

== See also ==
- List of Minnesota state forests
- Scenic State Park
- Taconite State Trail
- McCarthy Beach State Park
- Chippewa National Forest
