= Orr, Minnesota =

City in Minnesota, United States

- City
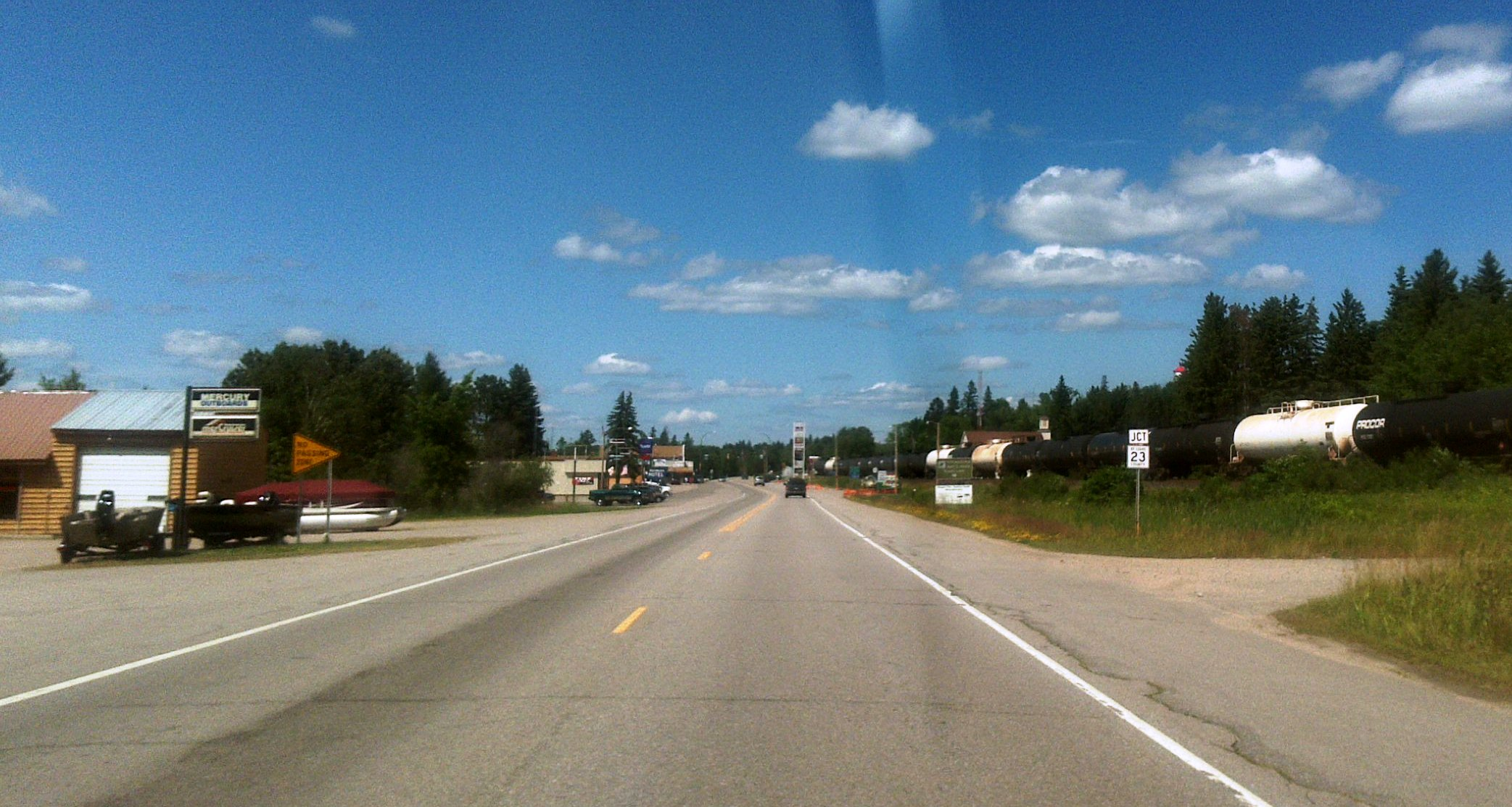
- U.S. Highway 53 serves as a main route in Orr

- Location of the city of Orr within Saint Louis County, Minnesota
- Coordinates: 48°03′13″N 92°49′52″W
- Country: United States
- State: Minnesota
- County: Saint Louis
- Incorporated: June 7, 1935

Government
  - Mayor: Robert Antikainen

Area
  - Total: 1.423 sq mi (3.686 km^{2})
  - Land: 1.402 sq mi (3.630 km^{2})
  - Water: 0.021 sq mi (0.054 km^{2})
- Elevation: 1,302 ft (397 m)

Population (2020)
  - Total: 211
  - Estimate (2022): 214
  - Density: 150.6/sq mi (58.13/km^{2})
- Time zone: UTC−6 (Central (CST))
  - Summer (DST): UTC−5 (CDT)
- ZIP Code: 55771
- Area code: 218
- FIPS code: 27-48634
- GNIS feature ID: 0662112
- Sales tax: 7.375%
- Website: https://orrmn.gov/

Orr (/ˈɒr/ ORR) is a city in Saint Louis County, Minnesota, United States. The population was 211 at the 2020 census.

U.S. Highway 53 serves as a main route in Orr.

Orr is located within the Kabetogama State Forest in Saint Louis County. It is a very popular destination for ATV and snowmobile enthusiasts during the winter.

== History ==
Orr got its start as a lumber town. A post office called Orr has been in operation since 1907. William Orr, an early postmaster, gave the community its name.

== Geography ==
According to the United States Census Bureau, the city has a total area of 1.423 square miles (3.69 km^{2}); 1.402 square miles (3.63 km^{2}) is land and 0.021 square miles (0.05 km^{2}) is water.

Orr is along Pelican Lake.

=== Climate ===
Orr has a dry winter humid continental climate (Köppen Dwb).

Climate data for Orr, Minnesota, 1991–2020 normals, 2006-2020 snowfall: 1315ft (401m)
Month	Jan	Feb	Mar	Apr	May	Jun	Jul	Aug	Sep	Oct	Nov	Dec	Year
Record high °F (°C)	45 (7)	55 (13)	76 (24)	78 (26)	89 (32)	88 (31)	96 (36)	91 (33)	91 (33)	87 (31)	69 (21)	45 (7)	96 (36)
Mean maximum °F (°C)	36 (2)	40 (4)	57 (14)	69 (21)	82 (28)	84 (29)	87 (31)	85 (29)	82 (28)	67 (19)	53 (12)	39 (4)	89 (32)
Mean daily maximum °F (°C)	14.9 (−9.5)	20.9 (−6.2)	33.8 (1.0)	48.0 (8.9)	61.2 (16.2)	70.9 (21.6)	75.3 (24.1)	74.0 (23.3)	64.3 (17.9)	49.5 (9.7)	33.4 (0.8)	20.7 (−6.3)	47.2 (8.5)
Daily mean °F (°C)	3.5 (−15.8)	7.4 (−13.7)	21.1 (−6.1)	35.5 (1.9)	48.2 (9.0)	58.3 (14.6)	63.0 (17.2)	61.0 (16.1)	52.9 (11.6)	40.1 (4.5)	25.4 (−3.7)	11.4 (−11.4)	35.6 (2.0)
Mean daily minimum °F (°C)	−7.9 (−22.2)	−6.1 (−21.2)	8.3 (−13.2)	23.1 (−4.9)	35.1 (1.7)	45.7 (7.6)	50.7 (10.4)	48.0 (8.9)	41.4 (5.2)	30.7 (−0.7)	17.4 (−8.1)	2.2 (−16.6)	24.0 (−4.4)
Mean minimum °F (°C)	−34 (−37)	−32 (−36)	−20 (−29)	6 (−14)	24 (−4)	31 (−1)	40 (4)	36 (2)	27 (−3)	16 (−9)	−5 (−21)	−24 (−31)	−36 (−38)
Record low °F (°C)	−44 (−42)	−43 (−42)	−34 (−37)	−6 (−21)	19 (−7)	26 (−3)	36 (2)	31 (−1)	23 (−5)	0 (−18)	−22 (−30)	−36 (−38)	−44 (−42)
Average precipitation inches (mm)	0.90 (23)	0.65 (17)	0.88 (22)	1.72 (44)	2.73 (69)	4.16 (106)	4.13 (105)	3.06 (78)	2.97 (75)	2.33 (59)	1.50 (38)	1.00 (25)	26.03 (661)
Average snowfall inches (cm)	14.1 (36)	12.8 (33)	8.0 (20)	9.7 (25)	0.3 (0.76)	0.0 (0.0)	trace	0.0 (0.0)	trace	2.5 (6.4)	10.1 (26)	18.1 (46)	75.6 (193.16)
Source 1: NOAA
Source 2: XMACIS (snowfall, records & monthly max/mins)

== Demographics ==
Historical population
Census	Pop.	Note	%±
1940	234		—
1950	309		32.1%
1960	361		16.8%
1970	315		−12.7%
1980	294		−6.7%
1990	265		−9.9%
2000	249		−6.0%
2010	267		7.2%
2020	211		−21.0%
2022 (est.)	214		1.4%
U.S. Decennial Census; 2020 Census

=== 2010 census ===
As of the 2010 census, there were 267 people, 117 households, and 69 families living in the city. The population density was 197.8 inhabitants per square mile (76.4/km^{2}). There were 152 housing units at an average density of 112.6 per square mile (43.5/km^{2}). The racial makeup of the city was 80.9% White, 18.4% Native American, and 0.7% from two or more races.

There were 117 households, of which 28.2% had children under the age of 18 living with them, 41.0% were married couples living together, 13.7% had a female householder with no husband present, 4.3% had a male householder with no wife present, and 41.0% were non-families. 36.8% of all households were made up of individuals, and 9.4% had someone living alone who was 65 years of age or older. The average household size was 2.28 and the average family size was 2.96.

The median age in the city was 42.1 years. 23.6% of residents were under the age of 18; 7% were between the ages of 18 and 24; 23.6% were from 25 to 44; 31.1% were from 45 to 64; and 14.6% were 65 years of age or older. The gender makeup of the city was 51.3% male and 48.7% female.

=== 2000 census ===
As of the 2000 census, there were 249 people, 112 households, and 70 families living in the city. The population density was 185.8 inhabitants per square mile (71.7/km^{2}). There were 135 housing units at an average density of 100.7 per square mile (38.9/km^{2}). The racial makeup of the city was 84.74% White, 13.25% Native American, and 2.01% from two or more races. Hispanic or Latino of any race were 0.40% of the population. 16.2% were of Finnish, 15.7% Irish, 13.0% German, 9.2% Norwegian, 6.5% Swedish and 5.4% American ancestry.

There were 112 households, out of which 33.0% had children under the age of 18 living with them, 50.9% were married couples living together, 6.3% had a female householder with no husband present, and 37.5% were non-families. 36.6% of all households were made up of individuals, and 23.2% had someone living alone who was 65 years of age or older. The average household size was 2.22 and the average family size was 2.87.

In the city, the population was spread out, with 25.7% under the age of 18, 6.0% from 18 to 24, 27.3% from 25 to 44, 20.5% from 45 to 64, and 20.5% who were 65 years of age or older. The median age was 38 years. For every 100 females, there were 100.8 males. For every 100 females age 18 and over, there were 90.7 males.

The median income for a household in the city was $27,222, and the median income for a family was $38,571. Males had a median income of $32,292 versus $15,000 for females. The per capita income for the city was $14,776. About 12.9% of families and 16.4% of the population were below the poverty line, including 7.4% of those under the age of eighteen and 33.3% of those 65 or over.

== Transportation ==
=== Airport ===
- Orr Regional Airport
