= Nett Lake (CDP), Minnesota =

Census-designated place in Minnesota, US

Nett Lake Asabikonezaaga’iganing (Ojibwe)
- Census-designated place (CDP) and Unincorporated community
- Location within Minnesota Location within the United States
- Coordinates: 48°06′53″N 93°04′52″W
- Country: United States
- State: Minnesota
- County: Saint Louis

Area
  - Total: 1.72 sq mi (4.46 km^{2})
  - Land: 1.72 sq mi (4.46 km^{2})
  - Water: 0 sq mi (0.00 km^{2})
- Elevation: 1,296 ft (395 m)

Population (2020)
  - Total: 230
  - Density: 133.7/sq mi (51.61/km^{2})
- Time zone: UTC-6 (Central (CST))
  - Summer (DST): UTC-5 (CDT)
- ZIP codes: 55771
- Area code: 218
- GNIS feature ID: 2628823

Nett Lake (Ojibwe: Asabikonezaaga’iganing) is an unincorporated community and census-designated place (CDP) in Nett Lake Territory, Saint Louis County, Minnesota, United States; located on the shore of Nett Lake. As of the 2020 census, its population was 230.

The community of Nett Lake is located 18 miles west of Orr, and 31 miles northwest of Cook.

Saint Louis County Road 23 (CR 23) (Nett Lake Road) serves as a main route in the community.

The unincorporated community of Nett Lake is located within the Nett Lake Indian Reservation (Bois Forte Indian Reservation).

Between 1907 and 1931, the Nett Lake Boarding and Day School, a Native American residential school, operated in Nett Lake.

== Demographics ==
Historical population
Census	Pop.	Note	%±
2020	230		—
U.S. Decennial Census
