= Little Fork River =

River in Minnesota, the United States of America

- Mouth of the Little Fork River

Location
- Country: United States
- State: Minnesota
- County: Koochiching County, St. Louis County

Physical characteristics
- Source
  - coordinates: 47.8201962°N 92.4662798°W
- Mouth: Rainy River
  - coordinates: 48.5274451°N 93.5879362°W
- Length: 160 mi (260 km)
- Basin size: 1,179,520 acres

Basin features
- River system: Rainy River

The Little Fork River (French: Rivière Petite Fourche; Ojibwe: Baaganowe-ziibi) is a river of Minnesota. It flows into the Rainy River. It flows 160 miles from central St. Louis County to its confluence with the Rainy River near International Falls. This river passes through forested areas with sparse population, and the small towns of Cook and Littlefork. The watershed spans 1,179,520 acres, due to its geology and soil composition, the watershed is prone to high sediment loads, which contribute to turbidity in the Little Fork River and impact water quality downstream in the Rainy River basin. It contributes approximately 37% of the total suspended solids load in the Rainy River, despite comprising less than 9% of the basin's total area.

== See also ==
- List of rivers of Minnesota
- List of longest streams of Minnesota
