= Duluth, Minnesota =

City in Minnesota, United States

Duluth, Minnesota Misaabekong / Onigamiinsing (Ojibwe)
- City
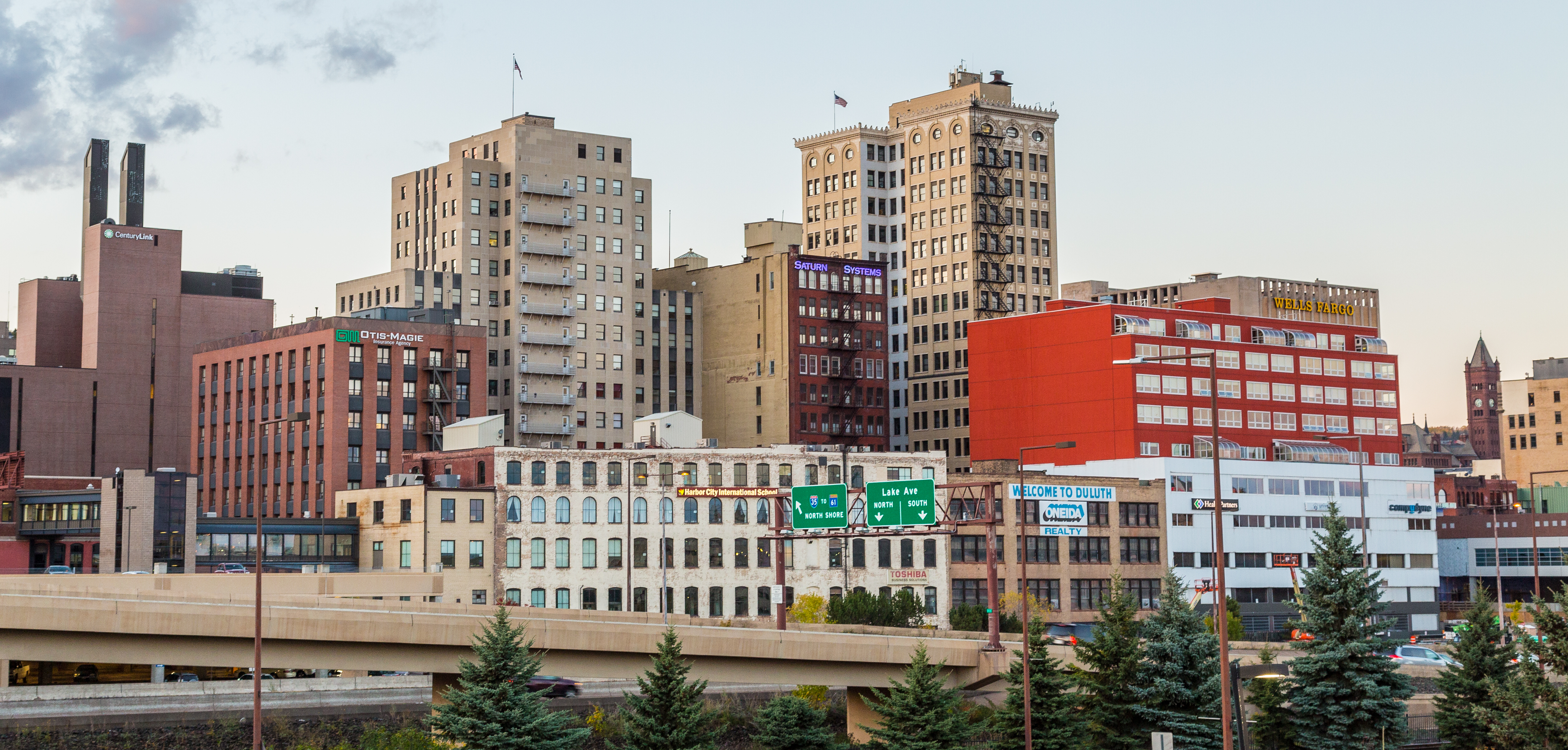
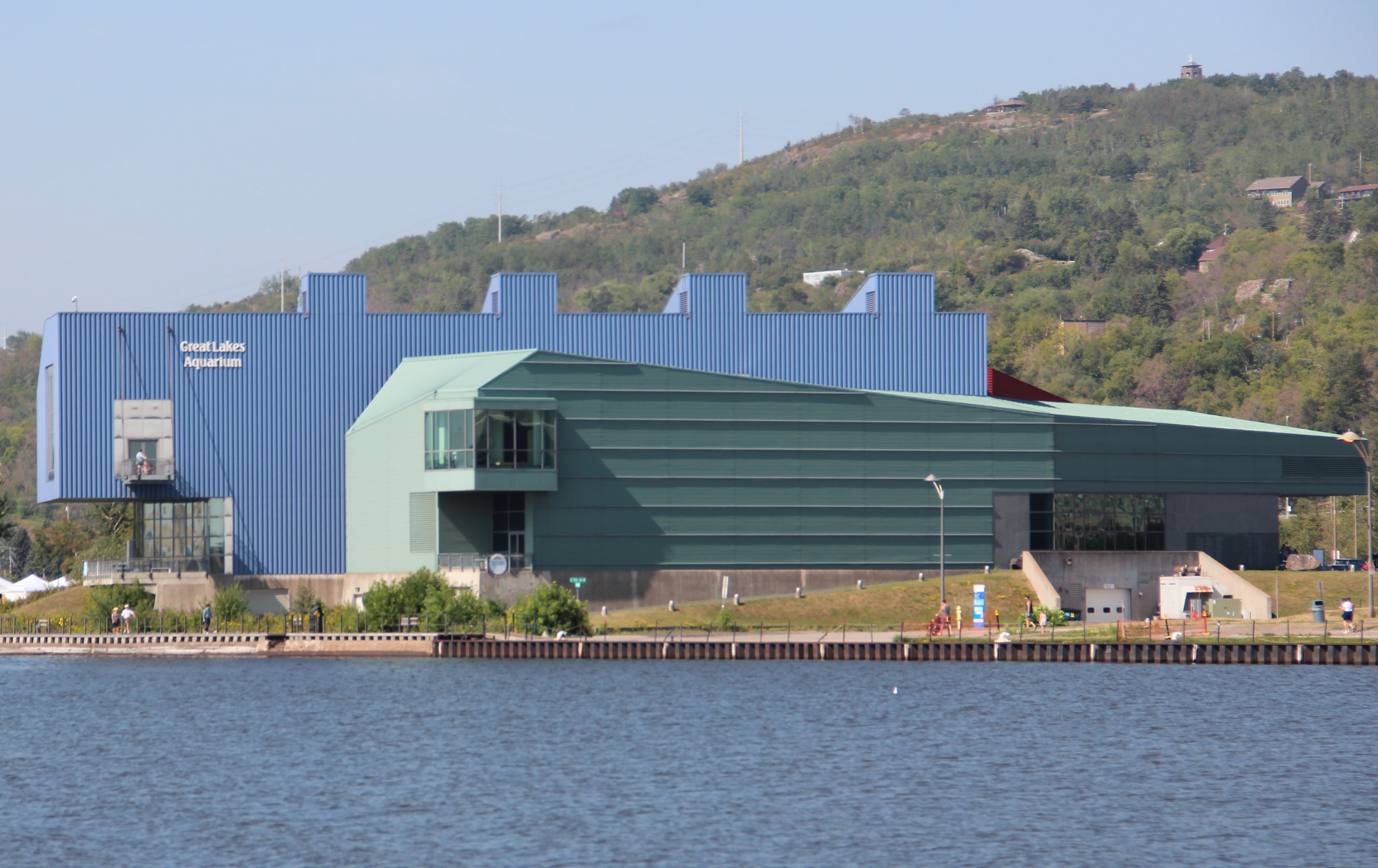
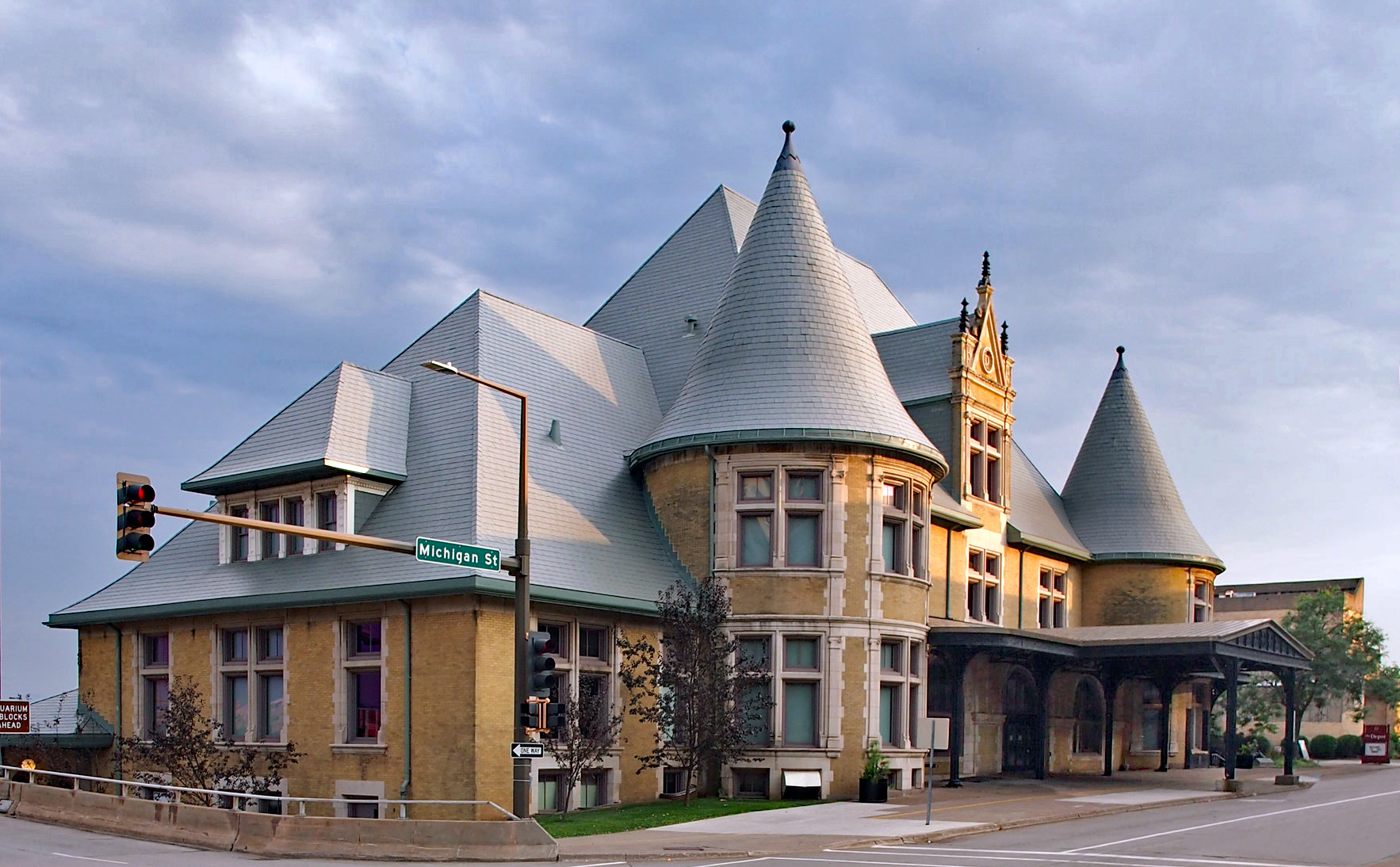
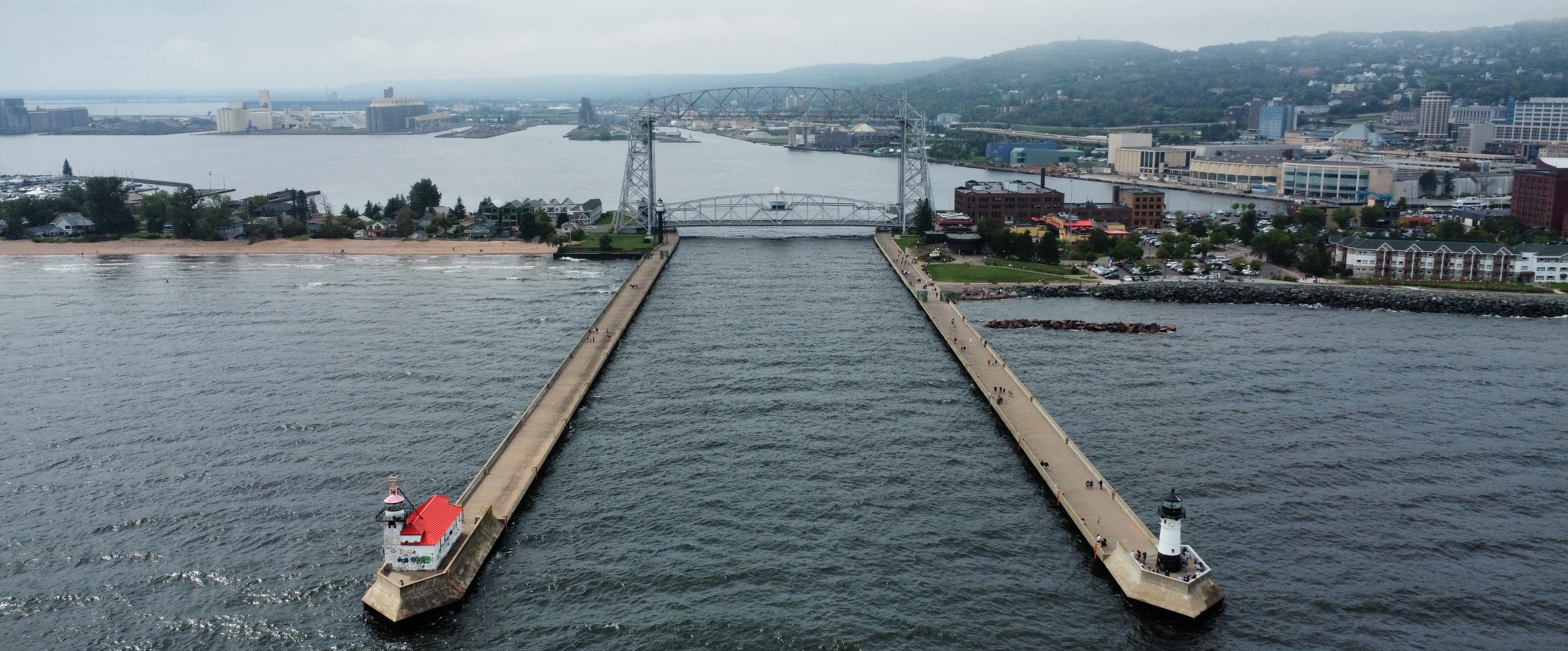
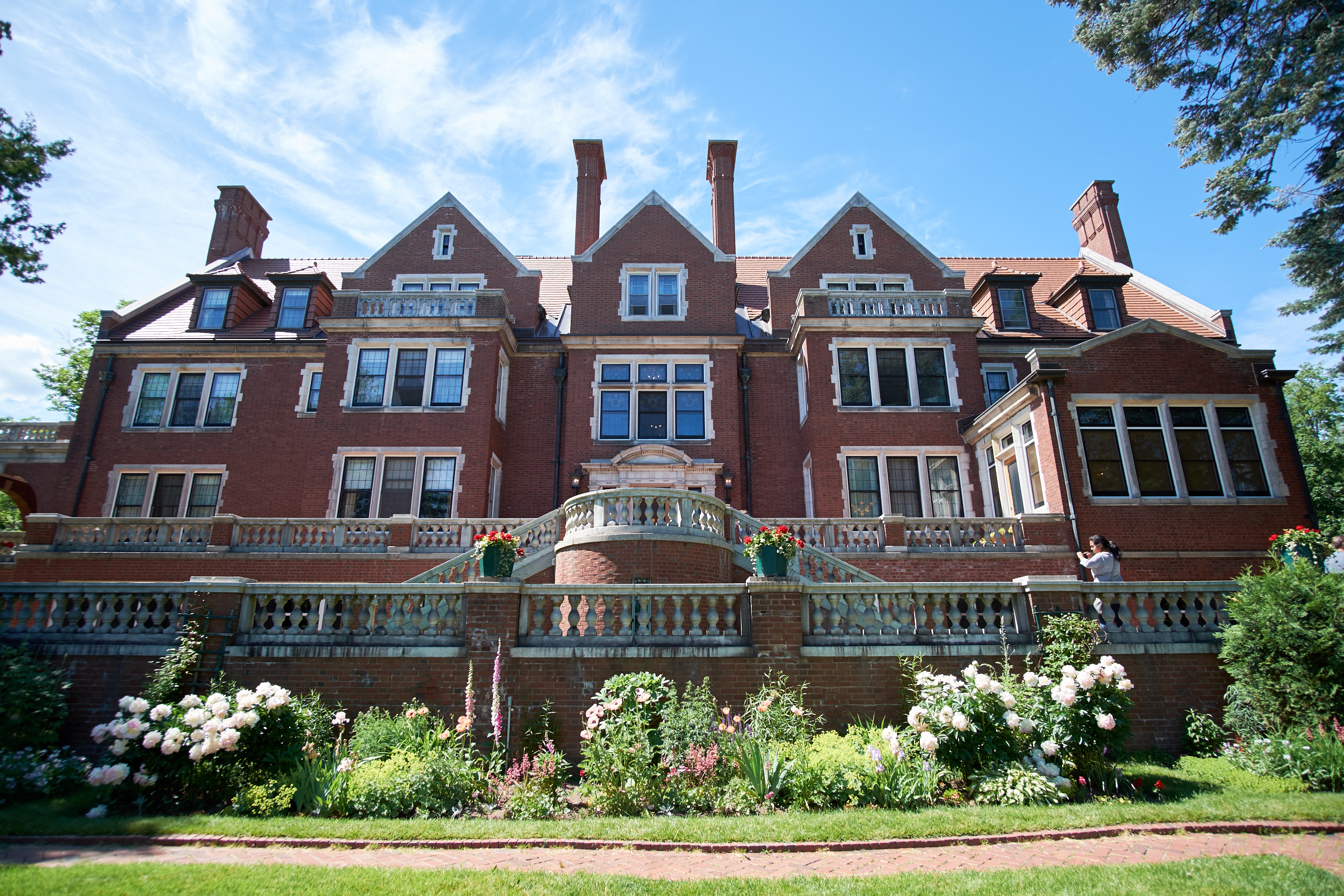
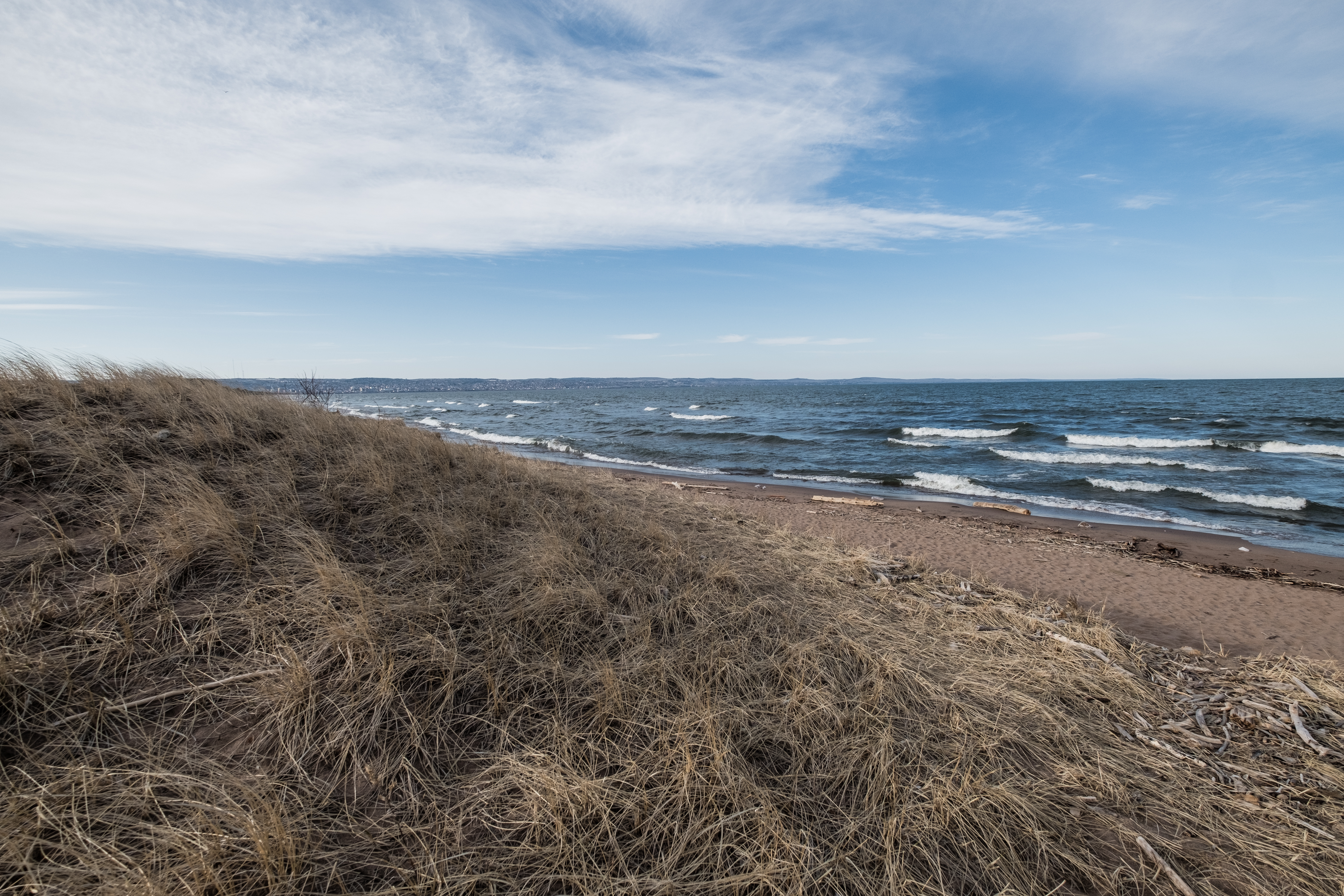
- Downtown Duluth Great Lakes Aquarium Duluth Union Depot Duluth Ship Canal and Aerial Lift Bridge Glensheen Estate Minnesota Point

- Flag Seal
- Nickname: Zenith City of the Unsalted Seas
- Interactive map of Duluth, Minnesota
- Location within Minnesota Location within the United States
- Coordinates: 46°47′4″N 92°6′19″W
- Country: United States
- State: Minnesota
- County: St. Louis
- Metro: Twin Ports
- First Settled: 1850-51
- Platted: 1856
- Incorporated (town): May 19, 1857
- Incorporated (city): March 5, 1870
- Incorporated (city charter): March 2, 1887
- Named for: Daniel Greysolon, Sieur du Lhut

Government
  - Type: Mayor–council
  - Body: Duluth City Council
  - Mayor: Roger Reinert (DFL)
  - City manager: Dave Montgomery

Area
  - City: 80.168 sq mi (207.634 km^{2})
  - Land: 71.658 sq mi (185.593 km^{2})
  - Water: 8.510 sq mi (22.041 km^{2}) 22.46%
  - Urban: 66.87 sq mi (173.20 km^{2})
  - Metro: 8,413.17 sq mi (21,790.01 km^{2})
- Elevation: 705 ft (215 m)

Population (2020)
  - City: 86,697
  - Estimate (2025): 88,330 ▲
  - Rank: US: 398th MN: 4th
  - Density: 1,223.5/sq mi (472.39/km^{2})
  - Urban: 119,411 (US: 281st)
  - Urban density: 1,786/sq mi (689.5/km^{2})
  - Metro: 281,603 (US: 177th)
  - Metro density: 33.5/sq mi (12.92/km^{2})
  - Combined: 326,968 (US: 112th)
  - Combined density: 29.5/sq mi (11.39/km^{2})
- Demonym: Duluthian

GDP
  - Metro: $16.822 billion (2022)
- Time zone: UTC−6 (Central (CST))
  - Summer (DST): UTC−5 (CDT)
- ZIP Codes: 55801–55808, 55810–55812, 55814–55816
- Area code: 218
- FIPS code: 27-17000
- Sales tax: 8.875%
- Website: duluthmn.gov

Duluth (/dəˈluːθ/ də-LOOTH) is a port city in the U.S. state of Minnesota and the county seat of St. Louis County. Located on Lake Superior in Minnesota's Arrowhead Region, the city is a hub for cargo shipping. The population was 86,697 at the 2020 census, making it Minnesota's fifth-largest city. Duluth forms a metropolitan area with neighboring Superior, Wisconsin, called the Twin Ports. Duluth is south of the Iron Range and the Boundary Waters Canoe Area Wilderness. It is named after Daniel Greysolon, Sieur du Lhut, the area's first known European explorer.

Duluth is on the north shore of Lake Superior at the westernmost point of the Great Lakes. It is the largest metropolitan area, the second-largest city, and the largest U.S. city on the lake. Duluth is accessible to the Atlantic Ocean, 2,300 miles (3,700 km) away, via the Great Lakes Waterway and St. Lawrence Seaway. The Port of Duluth is the world's farthest inland port accessible to oceangoing ships and is the largest and busiest port on the Great Lakes. It is also among the top 20 U.S. ports by tonnage. Common items shipped through Duluth include coal, iron ore, grain, limestone, cement, salt, wood pulp, steel coil, and wind turbine parts.

Duluth is a popular Midwest tourist destination. The city is home to the Great Lakes Aquarium, a freshwater aquarium. The Aerial Lift Bridge, next to Canal Park, crosses the Duluth Ship Canal into the Duluth–Superior harbor. Minnesota Point, known locally as Park Point, is the world's longest freshwater baymouth bar, stretching 6 miles (10 km). The city is also the starting point for road trips along the North Shore of Lake Superior to Thunder Bay, Ontario.

== History ==
=== Native history ===
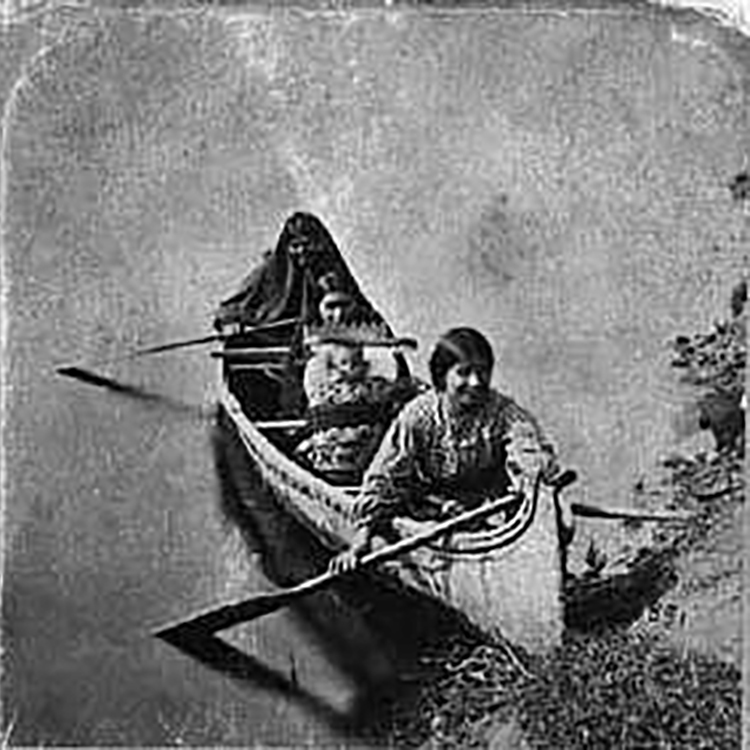
Ojibwe women on the St. Louis River, date unknown

For both the Ojibwe and the Dakota, interaction with Europeans during the contact period revolved around the fur trade and related activities. In Ojibwe, the area now known as Duluth is called Onigamiinsing or Misaabekong.

According to Ojibwe oral history, Spirit Island, near the Spirit Valley neighborhood, was the "Sixth Stopping Place" where the northern and southern branches of the Ojibwe Nation came together and proceeded to their "Seventh Stopping Place" near the present city of La Pointe, Wisconsin. The "Stopping Places" were places the Native Americans occupied during their westward migration because of their war with the Haudenosaunee and as Europeans overran their territory.

=== Exploration and fur trade ===
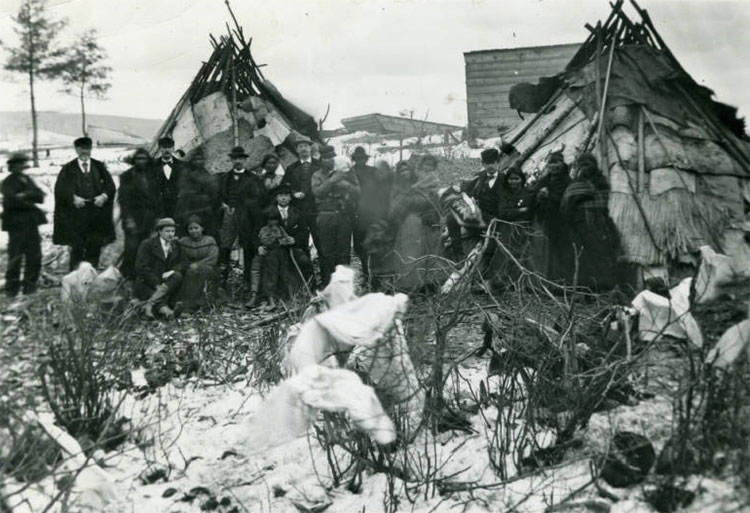
Ojibwe camp and white visitors on Minnesota Point, 19th century

Several factors brought fur traders to the Great Lakes in the early 17th century. The fashion for beaver hats in Europe generated demand for pelts. The French trade for beavers in the lower St. Lawrence River led to the depletion of the animals in the region by the late 1630s, after which the French searched farther west for new resources and new routes, making alliances with the Native Americans along the way to trap and deliver furs.

Étienne Brûlé is credited with the European discovery of Lake Superior before 1620. Pierre-Esprit Radisson and Médard des Groseilliers explored the Duluth area, Fond du Lac (Bottom of the Lake), in 1654 and again in 1660. The French soon established fur posts near Duluth and in the far north where Grand Portage became a major trading center. The French explorer Daniel Greysolon, Sieur du Lhut, whose name is sometimes anglicized as "DuLuth", explored the St. Louis River in 1679.

After 1792 and the independence of the United States, the North West Company established several posts on Minnesota rivers and lakes, as well as in areas to the west and northwest, for trading with the Ojibwe, the Dakota, and other native tribes. The first post was where Superior, Wisconsin, later developed; known as Fort St. Louis, the post became the headquarters for North West's new Fond du Lac Department. It had stockade walls, two houses of 40 feet (12 m) each, a shed of 60 feet (18 m), a large warehouse, and a canoe yard. Over time, Native American peoples and European Americans settled nearby, and a town gradually developed.

In 1808, German-born John Jacob Astor organized the American Fur Company. The company began trading at the Head of the Lakes in 1809. In 1817, it erected a new headquarters at present-day Fond du Lac on the St. Louis River. There, portages connected Lake Superior with Lake Vermilion to the north and with the Mississippi River to the south. After creating a powerful monopoly, Astor got out of the business around 1830, as the trade was declining. But active trade continued until the failure of the fur trade in the 1840s. European fashions changed, and many American areas were getting over-trapped, causing game to decline.

In 1832, Henry Schoolcraft visited the Fond du Lac area and wrote of his experiences with the Ojibwe Indians there. Henry Wadsworth Longfellow based the Song of Hiawatha, his epic poem relating the fictional adventures of an Ojibwe warrior named Hiawatha and the tragedy of his love for Minnehaha, a Dakota woman, on Schoolcraft's writings.

Natives signed two Treaties of Fond du Lac with the United States in the present neighborhood of Fond du Lac in 1826 and 1847; in them, the Ojibwe ceded land to the American government. As part of the Treaty of Washington (1854) with the Lake Superior Band of Chippewa, the United States placed the Fond du Lac Indian Reservation upstream from Duluth near Cloquet, Minnesota (with the western part of Cloquet partially on the reservation).

=== Permanent settlement ===
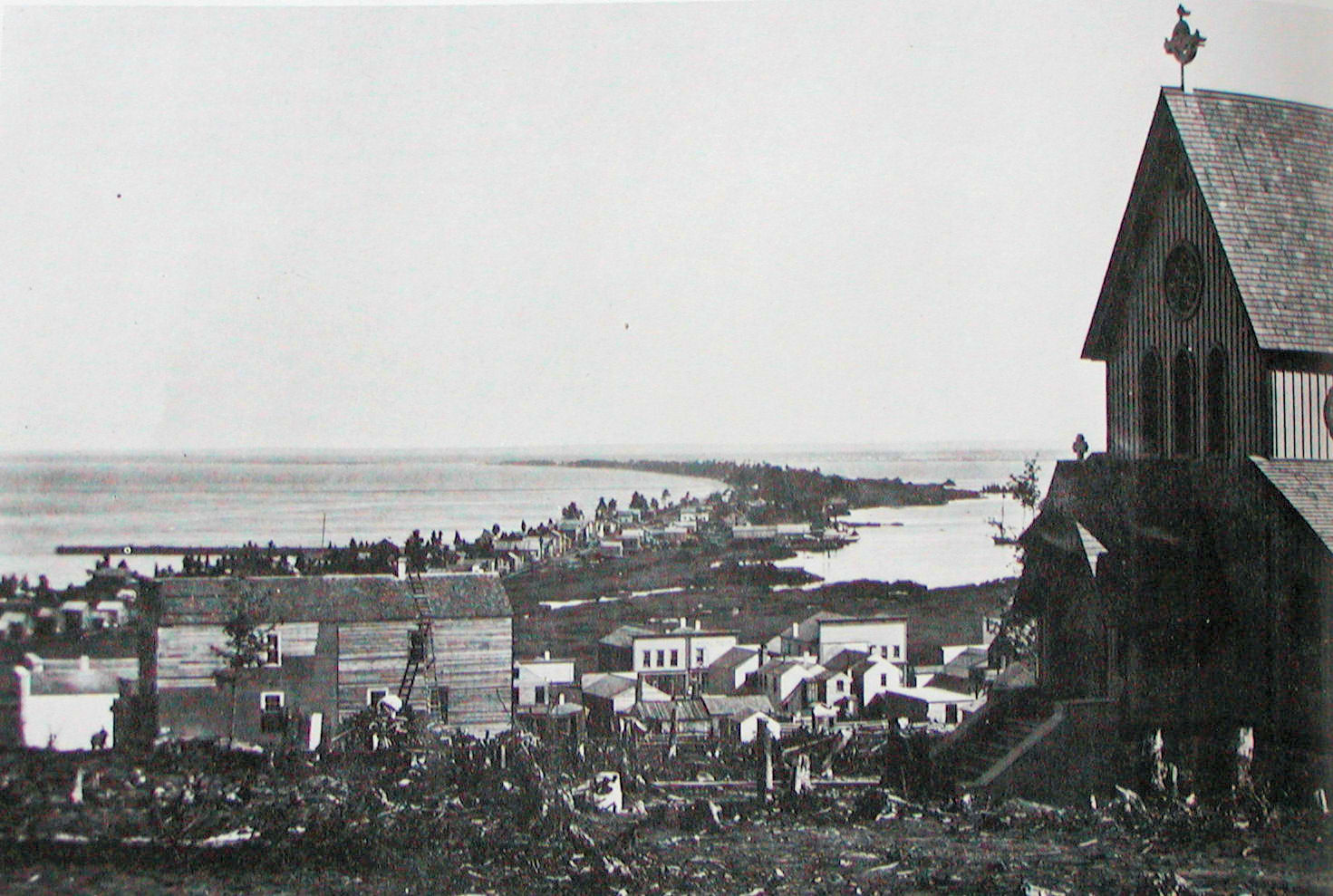
Minnesota Point from the hill above Duluth in 1875

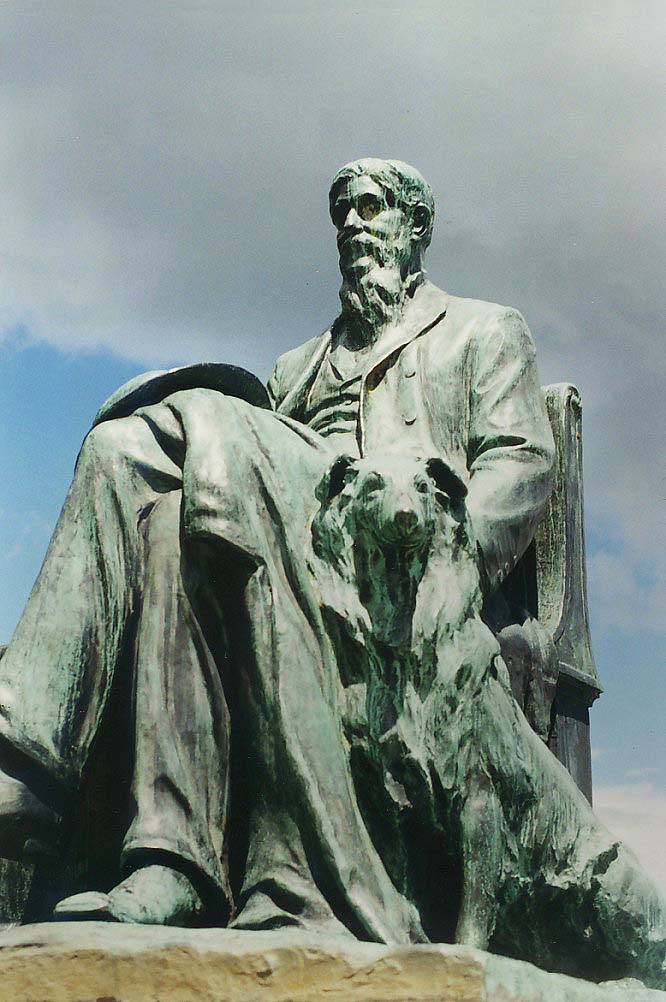
Statue of Jay Cooke in Jay Cooke Plaza

As European Americans continued to settle and encroach on Ojibwe lands, the U.S. government made a series of treaties, executed between 1837 and 1889, that expropriated vast areas of tribal lands for their use and subsequently relegated the Native American peoples to a number of small reservations. Interest in the area was piqued in the 1850s by rumors of copper mining. A government land survey in 1852, followed by a treaty with local tribes in 1854, secured wilderness lands for gold-seeking explorers, sparked a land rush, and led to the development of iron ore mining in the area. The 1854 Ojibwe Land Cession Treaty would force the Ojibwe onto what are now known as the Fond du Lac and Grand Portage Reservations, though some land rights such as hunting and fishing were retained.

Around the same time, newly constructed channels and locks in the East permitted large ships to access the area. A road connecting Duluth to the Twin Cities was also constructed. Eleven small towns on both sides of the St. Louis River were formed, establishing Duluth's roots as a city.

By 1857, copper resources were scarce and the area's economic focus shifted to timber harvesting. A nationwide financial crisis, the Panic of 1857, caused most of the city's early pioneers to leave. A history of Duluth written in 1910 says: "Of the handful remaining in 1859 four men were unemployed and one of those was a brewer. Capital idea; build a brewery. The absence of malt and hops and barley did not at all embarrass those stout-hearted settlers." The water for brewing was obtained from a stream that emptied into Lake Superior that came to be called Brewery Creek. While the brewery "was not a pecuniary success", it became the Fitger Brewing Company a few decades later.

The opening of the canal at Sault Ste. Marie in 1855 and the contemporaneous announcement of the railroads' approach made Duluth the only port with access to both the Atlantic and Pacific Oceans. Soon, the lumber industry, railroads, and mining were all growing so quickly that the influx of workers could hardly keep up with demand; storefronts popped up almost overnight. By 1868, business in Duluth was booming. In a Fourth of July speech, Thomas Preston Foster, the founder of Duluth's first newspaper, coined the expression "The Zenith City of the Unsalted Seas".

In 1869–70, Duluth was the fastest-growing city in the country and was expected to surpass Chicago in only a few years. When Jay Cooke, a wealthy Philadelphia land speculator, convinced the Lake Superior and Mississippi Railroad to create an extension from St. Paul to Duluth, the railroad opened areas due north and west of Lake Superior to iron ore mining. Duluth's population on New Year's Day of 1869 consisted of 14 families; by the Fourth of July, 3,500 people were present to celebrate.

In the first Duluth Minnesotian printed on August 24, 1869, the editor placed the following notice on the editorial page:

Newcomers should comprehend that Duluth is at present a small place, and hotel and boarding room accommodation is extremely limited. However, lumber is cheap and shanties can be built. Everyone should bring blankets and come prepared to rough it at first.

In 1873, Cooke's empire crumbled, and the stock market crashed, causing Duluth to almost disappear from the map. But by the late 1870s, with the continued boom in lumber and mining and the completion of the railroads, Duluth bloomed again. By the turn of the century, it had almost 100,000 inhabitants and was again a thriving community with small-business loans, commerce, and trade flowing through the city. Mining continued in the Mesabi Range, and iron was shipped east to mills in Ohio. The trade continued into the 20th century.

==== "The Untold Delights of Duluth" ====
Early doubts about the Duluth area's potential were voiced in "The Untold Delights of Duluth," a speech U.S. Representative J. Proctor Knott of Kentucky gave in the U.S. House of Representatives on January 27, 1871. His speech opposing the St. Croix and Superior Land Grant lampooned Western boosterism, portraying Duluth as an Eden in fantastically florid terms. The speech has been reprinted in collections of folklore and humorous speeches and is regarded as a classic. The nearby city of Proctor, Minnesota, is named after Knott.

Duluth's unofficial sister city, Duluth, Georgia, got its name in 1871 shortly after Knott's speech gained national attention. Prominent Georgia newspaperman and politician Evan Howell had been called upon to make remarks at the dedication of a new railroad line into Howell's Crossing, a village named for his grandfather. There, Howell humorously suggested that the community be called "Duluth" instead, and townspeople agreed.

Proctor Knott is sometimes credited with characterizing Duluth as the "zenith city of the unsalted seas," but the honor for that coinage belongs to journalist Thomas Preston Foster, who spoke at a Fourth of July picnic in 1868.

Duluth panoramic view, c. 1898

=== 20th century ===
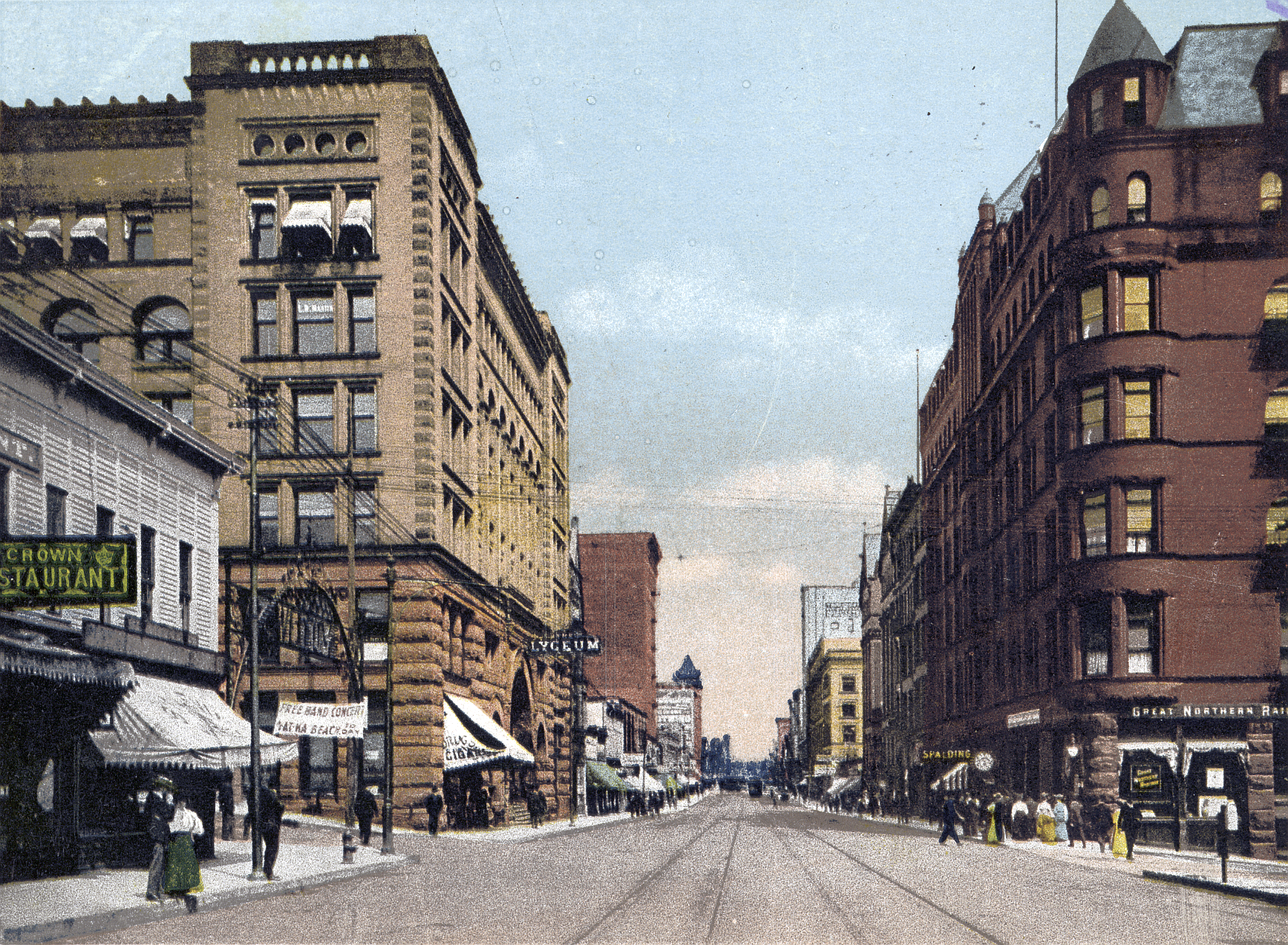
Superior Street, c. 1900

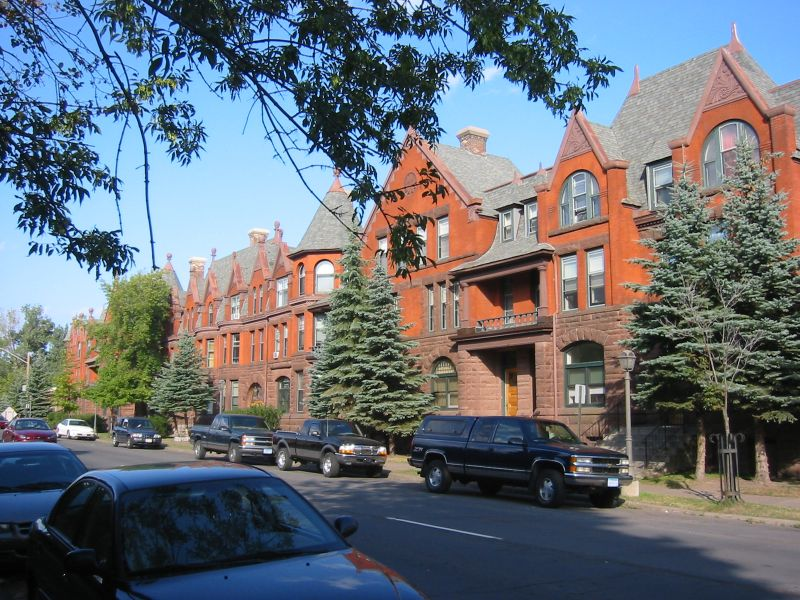
Chester Terrace, built in 1890

During the early 20th century, Duluth emerged as a significant industrial and shipping center, and was briefly the busiest port in the United States by tonnage. The city flourished economically, with ten newspapers, six banks, and the 11-story Torrey Building symbolizing its urban growth. As of 1905, Duluth was said to be home to the most millionaires per capita in the United States. The arrival of U.S. Steel in 1907 and subsequent development of the Duluth Works plant, which began production in 1915, further stimulated expectations of rapid population growth. Alongside the plant, the company built Morgan Park as a model company town. Numerous manufacturing firms, including the Diamond Calk Horseshoe Company and Marshall Wells Hardware, further diversified the city's industrial base.

Because of its numerous jobs in mining and industry, the city was a destination for large waves of immigrants from Europe during the early 20th century. It became the center of one of the largest Finnish communities in the world outside Finland. For decades, a Finnish-language daily newspaper, Päivälehti, was published in the city, named after the former Grand Duchy of Finland's pro-independence liberal paper. The Finnish community of Industrial Workers of the World (IWW) members published the widely read labor newspaper Industrialisti. From 1907 to 1941, the Finnish Socialist Federation and then the IWW operated Work People's College, an educational institution that taught classes from a working-class, socialist perspective. Immigrants from Sweden, Norway, Denmark, Germany, Austria, Czechoslovakia, Ireland, England, Italy, Poland, Hungary, Bulgaria, Croatia, Serbia, Ukraine, Romania, and Russia also settled in Duluth. At one time, Duluth was home to several historic immigrant neighborhoods, including Little Italy. Today, people of Scandinavian descent constitute a strong plurality of Duluth's population, accounting for more than a third of the residents identifying European ancestry.

In 1918, Finnish immigrant Olli Kinkkonen was lynched by the Knights of Liberty for refusing military service, a reflection of World War I-era nationalist fervor. In 1920, three African American circus workers—Elias Clayton, Elmer Jackson, and Isaac McGhie—were lynched by a white mob in the Duluth lynchings after a false accusation of rape. In 1970, journalist Michael Fedo wrote The Lynchings in Duluth, which began to raise awareness of the event. In 2003, the Clayton Jackson McGhie Memorial was dedicated at the lynching site, and the CJMM Committee continues to promote racial justice and public education in their memory.

Tragedy struck again when the 1918 Cloquet Fire ravaged northeastern Minnesota, including the Duluth area. It remains the deadliest natural disaster in Minnesota history. The fire destroyed numerous rural communities, leaving hundreds dead and thousands homeless. The Duluth Minnesota National Guard unit was deployed to battle the fire and assist survivors. Retired Duluth News Tribune columnist and journalist Jim Heffernan wrote that his mother "recalled an overnight vigil watching out the window of their small home on lower Piedmont Avenue with her father, her younger sisters having gone to sleep, ready to be evacuated to the waterfront should the need arise. The fire never made it that far down the hill, but devastated what is now Piedmont Heights, and, of course, a widespread area of Northeastern Minnesota." In the fire's aftermath, tens of thousands of people were left injured or homeless; many of the refugees fled into the city for aid and shelter.

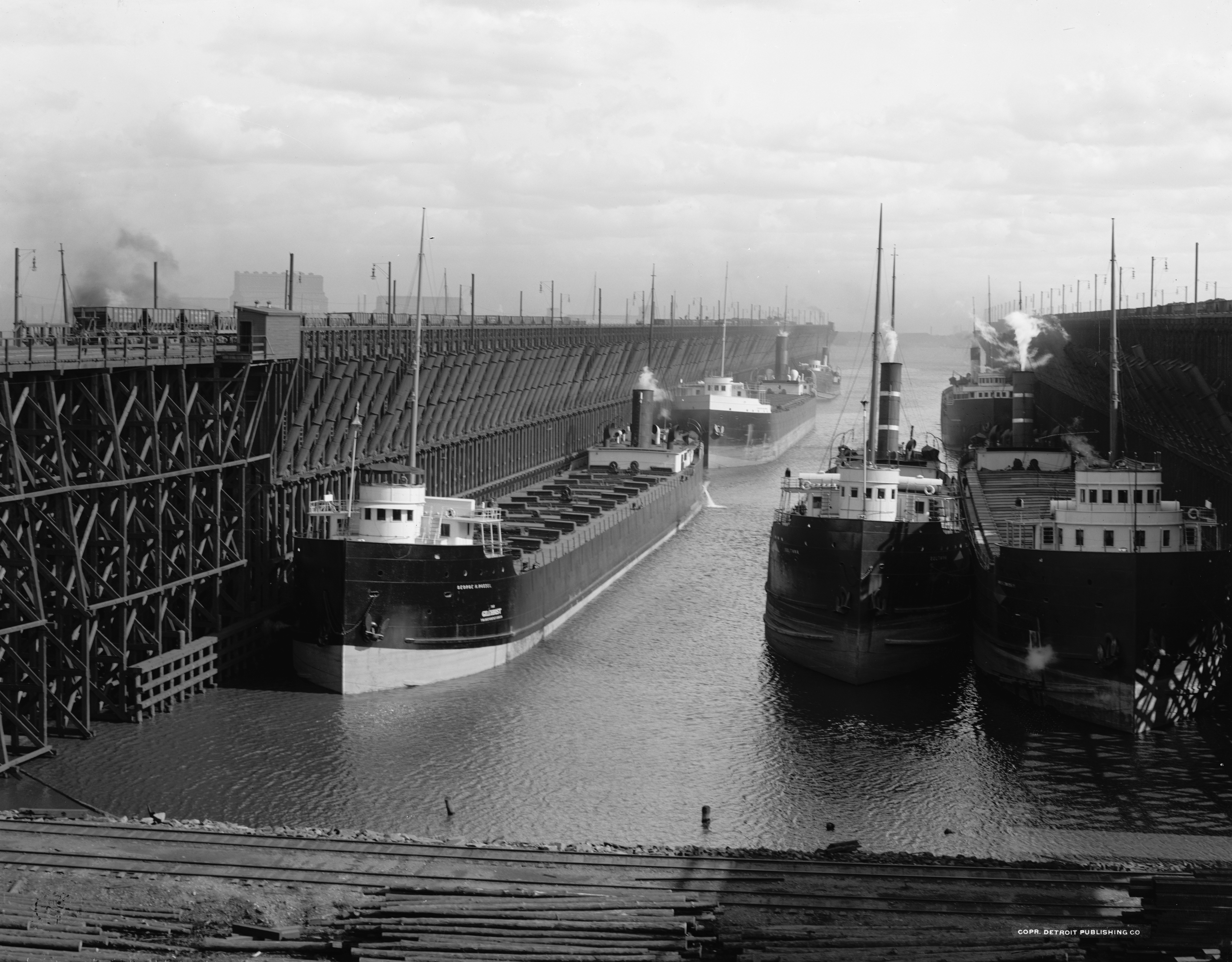
Duluth Ore Docks and freighters c. 1900–1915

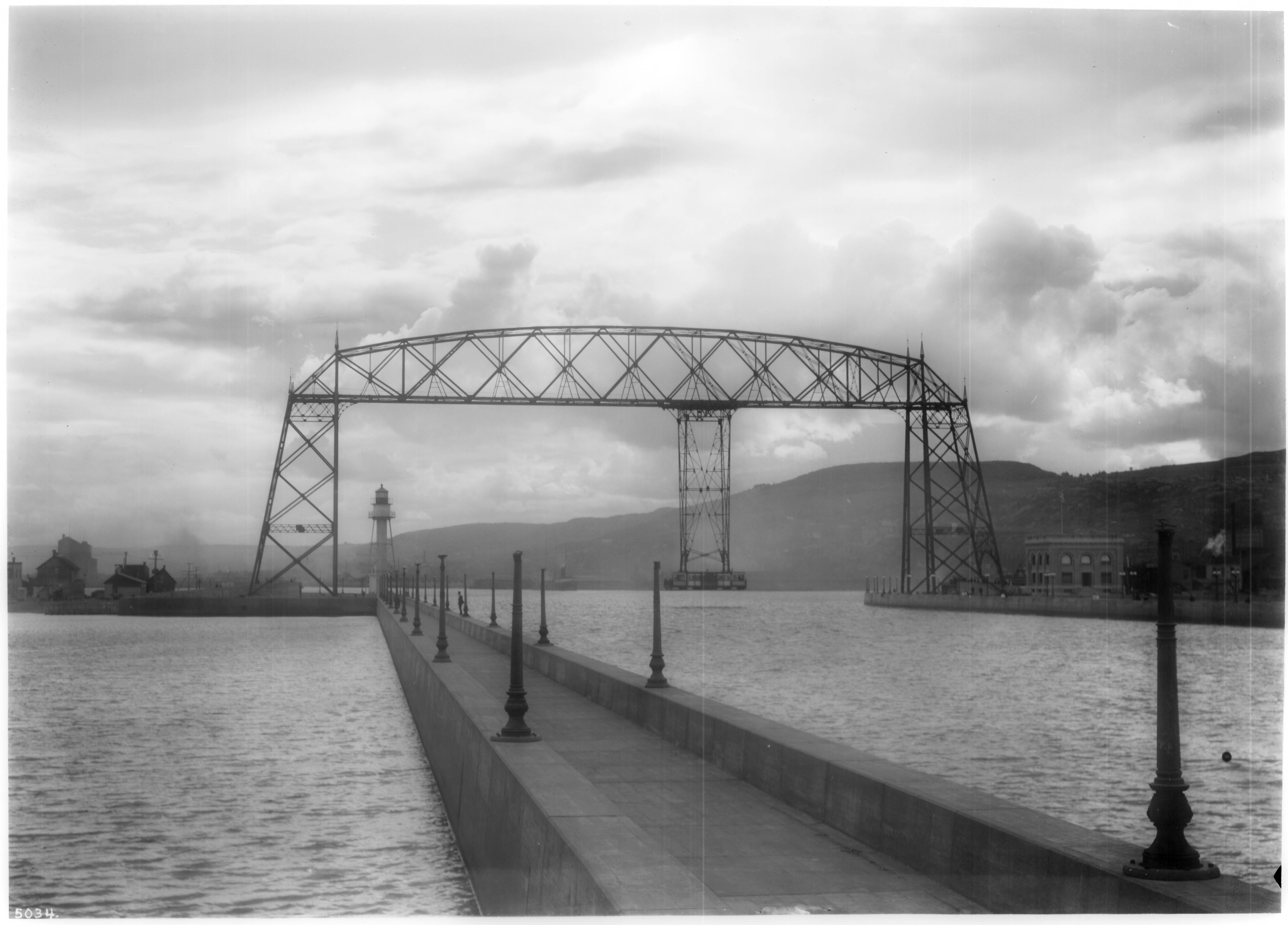
Aerial Bridge c. 1920, as a ferry bridge before conversion to a vertical-lift bridge

Throughout the first half of the 20th century, Duluth continued to grow as an industrial port town, shipping iron ore from the Mesabi Range and supporting a network of grain elevators, mills, and factories. The Aerial Lift Bridge (earlier known as the "Aerial Bridge" or "Aerial Ferry Bridge") was built in 1905 and was the United States' first transporter bridge. Only one other like it was ever constructed in the country. Duluth played a critical role in wartime production during both world wars, especially through shipbuilding in Riverside, a neighborhood created to house workers. The population peaked in 1960 at 107,884.

Economic decline began in the 1950s, when high-grade iron ore ran out on the Iron Range north of Duluth; ore shipments from the Duluth harbor had been critical to the city's economy. Low-grade ore (taconite) shipments continued, boosted by new taconite pellet technology, but ore shipments were lower overall. In the 1970s and early 1980s, Duluth was hit hard by the U.S. steel crisis, leading to the closure of the Duluth Works plant in 1981 and other dependent industries, including the cement factory. The resulting economic downturn devastated the city, especially the West Side, and unemployment rose sharply, peaking at 15% by the late 1980s.

During the 1980s, plans were underway to extend Interstate 35 through Duluth and up the North Shore, bringing new access to the city. The original plan called for the interstate to run along the shore on an elevated concrete structure, blocking the city's access to Lake Superior. Kent Worley, a local landscape architect, wrote an impassioned letter to then mayor Ben Boo asking that the route be reconsidered. The Minnesota Department of Transportation then agreed to take another look, with Worley consulting. The new plan called for parts of the highway to run through tunnels, which allowed preservation of Fitger's Brewery, Sir Ben's Tavern, Leif Erikson Park, and Duluth's Rose Garden. Rock used from the interstate project was used to create an extensive new beach along Lake Superior, along which the city's Lakewalk was built.

=== 21st century ===
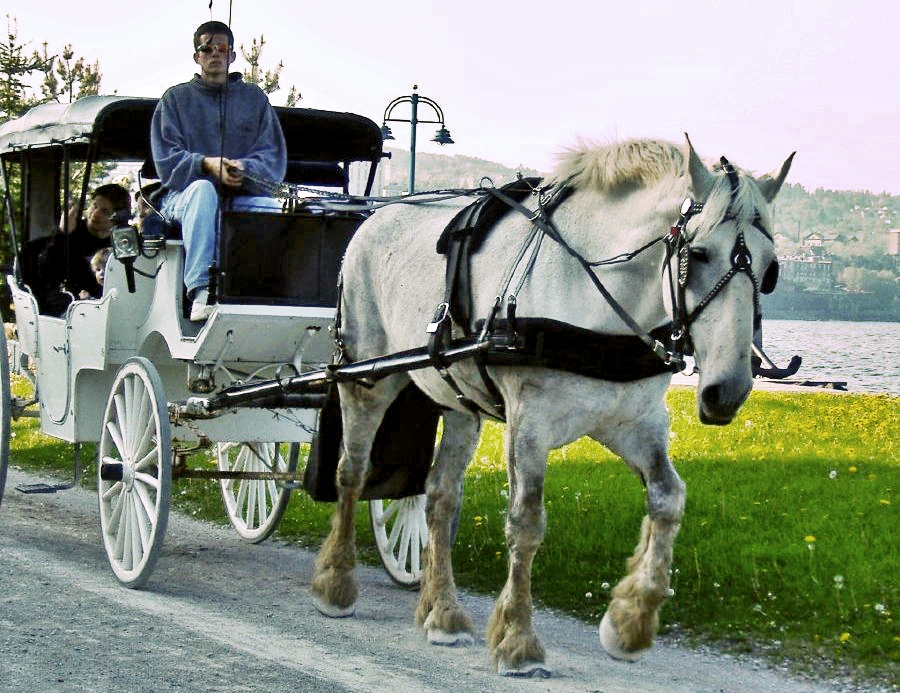
Canal Park Lakewalk carriage ride

With the decline of the city's industrial core, the local economic focus gradually shifted to tourism. The downtown area was renovated to emphasize its pedestrian character: streets were paved with red brick, and skywalks and retail shops were added. The city and developers worked with the area's unique architectural character, converting old warehouses along the waterfront into cafés, shops, restaurants, and hotels. Combined with the new rock beach and Lakewalk, these changes developed the new Canal Park as a tourism-oriented district. Duluth's population, which had declined since 1960, stabilized at around 85,000.

In the 21st century, Duluth has become a regional center for banking, retail shopping, and medical care for northern Minnesota, northern Wisconsin, and northwestern Michigan. It is estimated that more than 8,000 jobs in Duluth are directly related to its two hospitals. Arts and entertainment offerings, as well as year-round recreation and the natural environment, have contributed to the tourist industry's expansion. Some 3.5 million visitors each year contribute more than $400 million to the local economy.

A group of like-minded businesses in Lincoln Park, an old rundown blue-collar neighborhood with high unemployment and poverty rates, was cultivated by a group of entrepreneurs who have been rebuilding and revitalizing the area. Since 2014, at least 25 commercial real estate transactions have occurred, and 17 businesses have opened, including restaurants, breweries, coffee shops and artist studios. Due to the neighborhood's revitalization, many developers are also investing in housing projects in anticipation of further growth.

Duluth's prominence as a port city gave it an economic advantage in its early years, but as various industries began to wane, new efforts to reclaim areas of the waterfront for public use emerged. Notable among them is the reclamation of the St. Louis River corridor, which runs along the edge of the city's western neighborhoods. Many of these sites, filled with legacy pollutants from industrial use, have been or are in the process of being restored by the United States Environmental Protection Agency (EPA), with several developments, such as Pier B Resort and Hotel, demonstrating the revitalization opportunity of these spaces. The Duluth Waterfront Collective has led other efforts to reclaim waterfront space, including the Highway 61 Revisited concept, which seeks to reimagine the I-35 corridor as it runs through the city's downtown. While the acreage of land using the waterway for port-related purposes has shifted in recent years, the goods shipped through the Duluth–Superior port have changed with the economy. In recent decades, shipments of coal and iron ore have declined while shipments of wind turbine components and multimodal shipping containers have increased.

== Geography ==
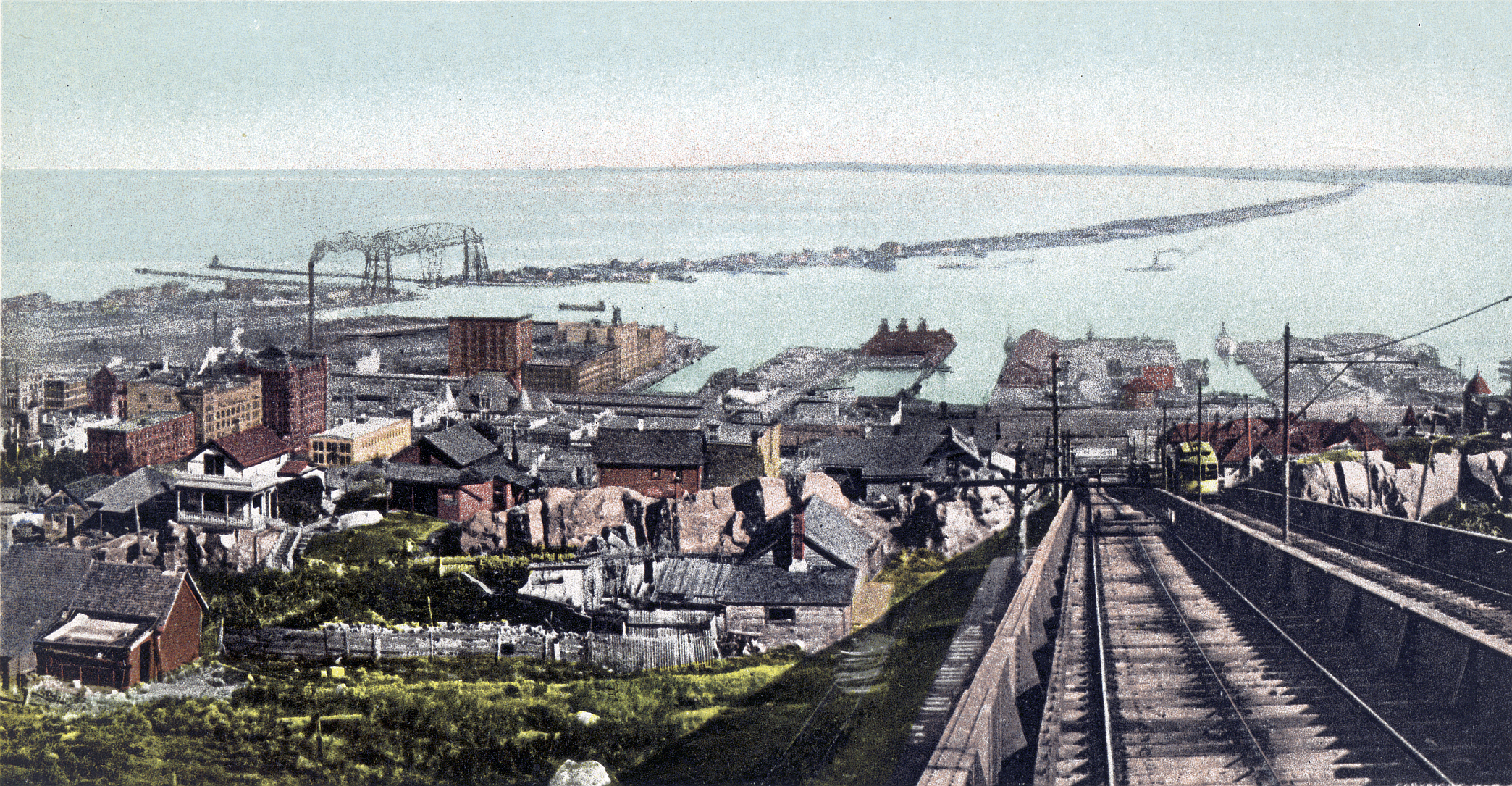
Minnesota Point (or Park Point) from Incline Railway, 1907

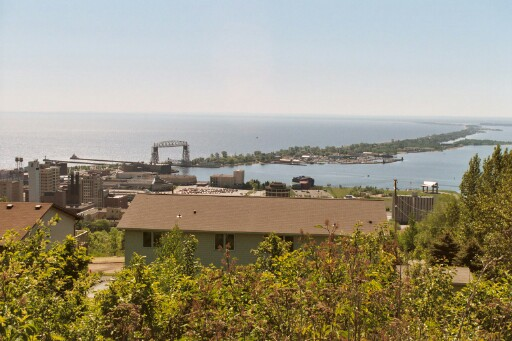
Minnesota Point in 2006

According to the United States Census Bureau, the city has an area of 80.168 square miles (207.63 km^{2}), of which 71.658 square miles (185.59 km^{2}) is land and 8.510 square miles (22.04 km^{2}) is water. It is Minnesota's second-largest city by land area, surpassed only by Hibbing. Duluth's canal connects Lake Superior to the Duluth–Superior harbor and the Saint Louis River. It is spanned by the Aerial Lift Bridge, which connects Canal Park with Minnesota Point (or "Park Point"). Minnesota Point is about 7 miles (11 km) long and, when included with adjacent Wisconsin Point, which extends 3 miles (4.8 km) from the city of Superior, Wisconsin, is the largest freshwater baymouth bar in the world at a total of 10 miles (16 km).

Map of Duluth neighborhoods

Duluth's topography is dominated by a steep hillside that climbs from Lake Superior to high inland elevations. Duluth has been called "the San Francisco of the Midwest", alluding to San Francisco's similar water-to-hilltop topography. This similarity was most evident before World War II, when Duluth had a network of streetcars and an inclined railroad, the 7th Avenue West Incline Railway, that, like San Francisco's cable cars, climbed a steep hill. The change in elevation is illustrated by Duluth's two airports. The weather station at the lakeside Sky Harbor Airport on Minnesota Point has an elevation of 607 feet (185 m), while Duluth International Airport, atop the hill, is 820 feet (250 m) higher at 1,427 feet (435 m).

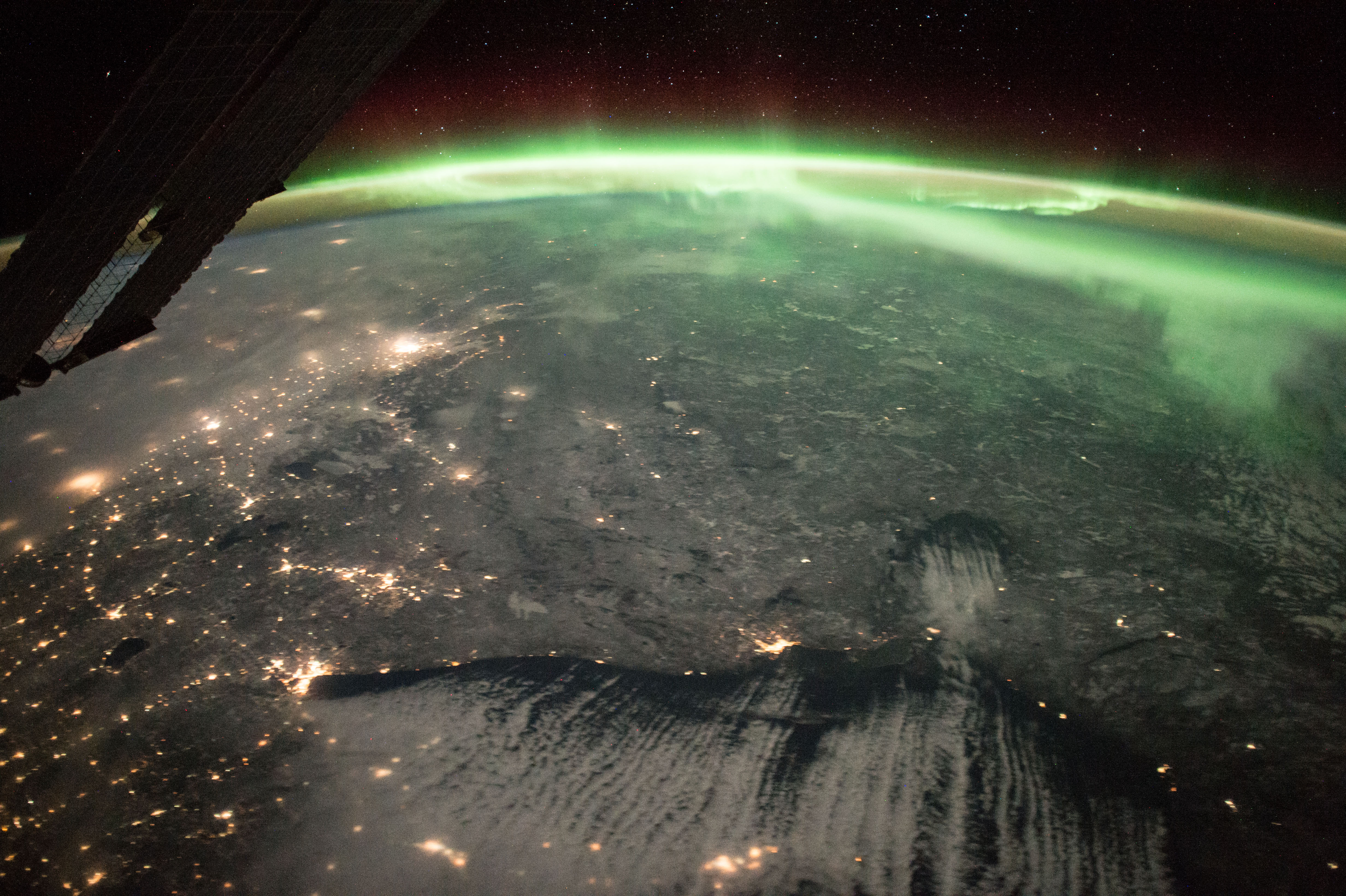
View from International Space Station, 2017. Duluth and Lake Superior coast are visible at far left

Even as the city has grown, its populace has tended to hug Lake Superior's shoreline, making Duluth a primarily southwest–northeast city. The considerable development on the hill has given Duluth many steep streets. Some neighborhoods, such as Piedmont Heights and Bayview Heights, are atop the hill with scenic views of the city. Skyline Parkway is a scenic roadway that extends from Becks Road above the Gary–New Duluth neighborhood near the western end of the city to the Lester Park neighborhood on the east side. It crosses nearly Duluth's entire length and affords views of Lake Superior, the Aerial Lift Bridge, Canal Park, and the many industries that inhabit the largest inland port.

A developing part of the city is the Miller Hill Mall area, as well as the adjacent big-box retailer shopping strips "over the hill" along the Miller Trunk Highway corridor. The 2009–10 road reconstruction project in Duluth's Miller Hill area improved movement through the U.S. Highway 53 corridor from Trinity Road to Maple Grove Road. The highway project reconstructed connector roads, intersections, and adjacent roadways. A new international airport terminal was completed in 2013 as part of the federal government's Stimulus Reconstruction Program.

=== Geological history ===
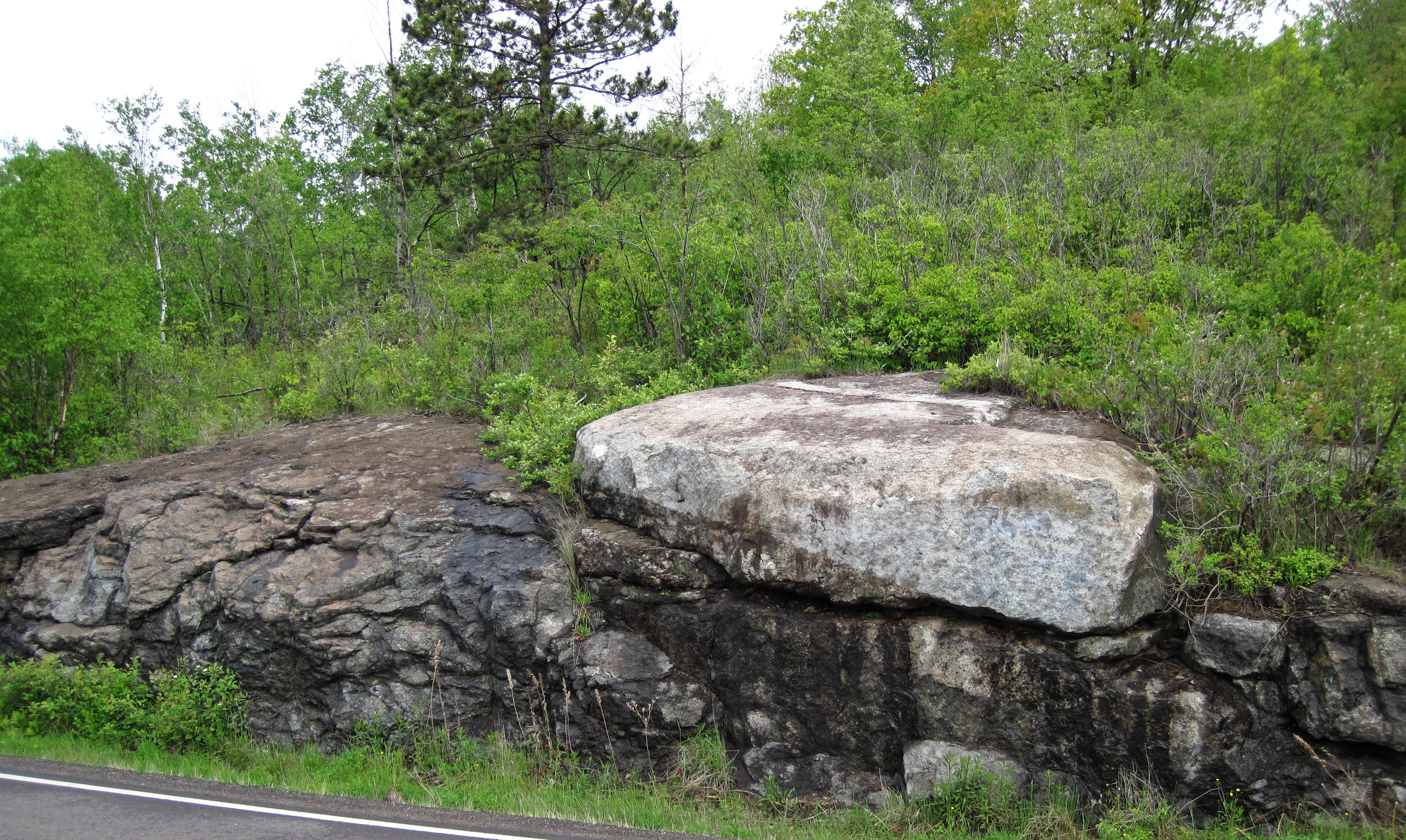
Anorthosite xenolith in Duluth, part of the Duluth Complex

Duluth's geology demonstrates the Midcontinent Rift, formed as the North American continent began to split apart about 1.1 billion years ago. As the Earth's crust thinned, magma rose toward the surface. These intrusions formed a 16 km (9.9 mi)-thick sill, primarily of gabbro, which is known as the Duluth Complex.

The creation of the Lake Superior basin reflects the erosive power of continental glaciers that advanced and retreated over Minnesota several times in the past 2 million years. The mile-thick ice sheets easily eroded the sandstone that filled the axis of the rift valley but encountered more resistance from the igneous rocks forming the flanks of the rift, now the margins of the lake basin. As the last glacier retreated, water filled the lake as high as 500 feet (150 m) above the current level; the Skyline Parkway roughly follows one of the highest levels of the ancient Lake Superior, Glacial Lake Duluth. The sandstone that buried the igneous rocks of the rift is exposed near Fond du Lac. At one time, a large number of quarries produced the stone, after which it was sold as Fond du Lac or Lake Superior brownstone; such stone was widely used in Duluth buildings and also shipped to Minneapolis, Chicago, and Milwaukee. The weathered sandstone forms the sandy lake bottom and shores of Park Point.

=== Climate ===
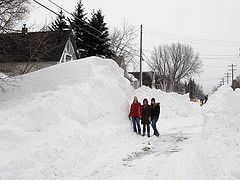
Late-winter blizzard, March 2007

Duluth

Climate chart (precipitation, max. and min. temperature)
J	F	M	A	M	J	J	A	S	O	N	D
1 20 2	1 25 6	1.5 36 18	2.5 49 30	3.4 63 41	4.4 72 50	3.9 78 56	3.7 76 55	3.5 67 47	2.9 53 36	2 37 23	1.5 25 10
- █ Average max. and min. temperatures in °F
- █ Precipitation totals in inches
Metric conversion
J	F	M	A	M	J	J	A	S	O	N	D
24 −7 −16	26 −4 −14	37 2 −8	64 10 −1	86 17 5	112 22 10	100 25 13	95 24 13	88 20 9	74 12 2	50 3 −5	37 −4 −12
- █ Average max. and min. temperatures in °C
- █ Precipitation totals in mm

Duluth has a humid continental climate (Köppen Dfb), slightly moderated by its proximity to Lake Superior. Winters are long, snowy, and very cold, normally seeing maximum temperatures remaining at or below 32 °F (0 °C) for 100 days (the second-most of any city in the contiguous US behind International Falls), falling to or below 0 °F (−18 °C) on 38 nights, and bringing consistent snow cover from late November to early April. Winter storms that pass south or east of Duluth can often set up easterly or northeasterly flow, leading to occasional upslope lake-effect snow events that bring 1 foot (30 cm) or more of snow to the city while areas 50 miles (80 km) inland receive considerably less. The average annual snowfall is 90.2 inches (2,290 mm). The lake steams in the winter when moist lake-warmed air at the surface rises and cools, losing some of its moisture-carrying capacity.

Using data on the minimum monthly temperature between 1981 and 2010, the National Oceanic and Atmospheric Administration (NOAA) developed a Comparative Climatic Data report. With a minimum average monthly low temperature of 1.5 °F (−16.9 °C) and a maximum average monthly low temperature of 55.4 °F (13.0 °C), Duluth was found to be the fifth-coldest city in the United States.

Summers are warm, although nights are generally cool, with daytime temperatures averaging 78 °F (26 °C) in July, with that figure being a few degrees warmer inland. Temperatures reach or exceed 90 °F (32 °C) on average only two days per year, while the city has officially seen 100 °F (38 °C) temperatures on only three days, all during the July 1936 heat wave from the Dust Bowl years. The phrase "cooler by the lake" can be heard often in weather forecasts during the summer, especially on days when an easterly wind is expected. Great local variations are also common because of the rapid change in elevation between the nearly 900-foot (270 m) hilltop and shoreside. Often, this variation manifests itself as snow in higher elevations, whereas rain falls near Lake Superior.

The record low temperature in Duluth is −41 °F (−41 °C), set on January 2, 1885. The record high temperature is 106 °F (41 °C), set on July 13, 1936. On average, the first freezing temperature occurs on September 30 and the last on May 14, although a freezing temperature has occurred in August. The average window for measurable (≥0.1 in or 0.25 cm) snowfall is October 22 through April 26.

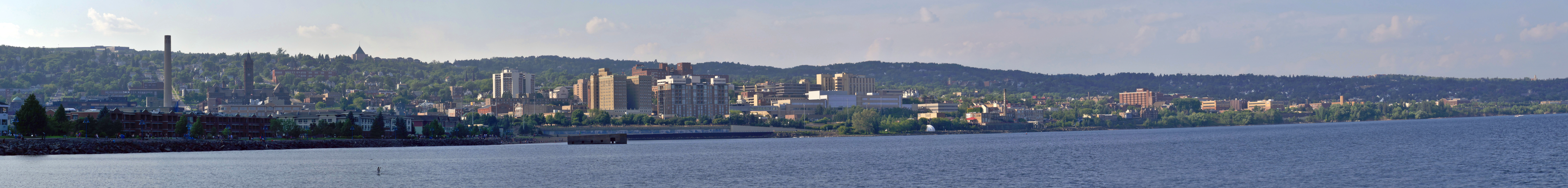
Skyline in summer, August 2017

Climate data for Duluth Int'l, Minnesota (1991–2020 normals, (Note: Mean monthly maxima and minima (i.e. the expected highest and lowest temperature readings at any point during the year or given month) calculated based on data at said location from 1991 to 2020.) extremes 1871–present (Note: Official records for Duluth were kept at downtown from August 1871 to May 1941, and at Duluth Int'l since June 1941. For more information, see ThreadEx.))
Month	Jan	Feb	Mar	Apr	May	Jun	Jul	Aug	Sep	Oct	Nov	Dec	Year
Record high °F (°C)	55 (13)	58 (14)	81 (27)	88 (31)	95 (35)	97 (36)	106 (41)	97 (36)	97 (36)	86 (30)	75 (24)	56 (13)	106 (41)
Mean maximum °F (°C)	38.6 (3.7)	43.0 (6.1)	55.9 (13.3)	70.7 (21.5)	81.7 (27.6)	86.0 (30.0)	88.6 (31.4)	86.7 (30.4)	81.9 (27.7)	74.0 (23.3)	55.4 (13.0)	40.3 (4.6)	90.2 (32.3)
Mean daily maximum °F (°C)	19.9 (−6.7)	24.8 (−4.0)	36.2 (2.3)	49.2 (9.6)	63.0 (17.2)	72.1 (22.3)	77.7 (25.4)	75.8 (24.3)	67.2 (19.6)	52.7 (11.5)	37.1 (2.8)	24.7 (−4.1)	50.0 (10.0)
Daily mean °F (°C)	11.2 (−11.6)	15.4 (−9.2)	27.0 (−2.8)	39.5 (4.2)	52.0 (11.1)	61.2 (16.2)	67.0 (19.4)	65.5 (18.6)	57.2 (14.0)	44.1 (6.7)	29.8 (−1.2)	17.1 (−8.3)	40.6 (4.8)
Mean daily minimum °F (°C)	2.4 (−16.4)	6.0 (−14.4)	17.8 (−7.9)	29.9 (−1.2)	41.0 (5.0)	50.2 (10.1)	56.2 (13.4)	55.2 (12.9)	47.3 (8.5)	35.6 (2.0)	22.5 (−5.3)	9.6 (−12.4)	31.1 (−0.5)
Mean minimum °F (°C)	−21.9 (−29.9)	−17.3 (−27.4)	−7.4 (−21.9)	14.7 (−9.6)	28.7 (−1.8)	38.1 (3.4)	45.7 (7.6)	44.6 (7.0)	32.5 (0.3)	21.9 (−5.6)	2.7 (−16.3)	−14.3 (−25.7)	−23.9 (−31.1)
Record low °F (°C)	−41 (−41)	−39 (−39)	−29 (−34)	−5 (−21)	16 (−9)	27 (−3)	35 (2)	32 (0)	23 (−5)	6 (−14)	−29 (−34)	−35 (−37)	−41 (−41)
Average precipitation inches (mm)	0.95 (24)	1.01 (26)	1.46 (37)	2.53 (64)	3.37 (86)	4.39 (112)	3.92 (100)	3.73 (95)	3.48 (88)	2.91 (74)	1.96 (50)	1.47 (37)	31.18 (792)
Average snowfall inches (cm)	16.8 (43)	15.1 (38)	12.8 (33)	9.1 (23)	0.8 (2.0)	0.0 (0.0)	0.0 (0.0)	0.0 (0.0)	0.1 (0.25)	2.7 (6.9)	14.1 (36)	18.7 (47)	90.2 (229)
Average extreme snow depth inches (cm)	18.6 (47)	20.3 (52)	19.4 (49)	8.2 (21)	0.4 (1.0)	0.0 (0.0)	0.0 (0.0)	0.0 (0.0)	0.0 (0.0)	1.2 (3.0)	6.6 (17)	12.7 (32)	24.8 (63)
Average precipitation days (≥ 0.01 in)	10.4	8.9	9.6	11.3	12.7	12.4	11.9	10.8	11.6	11.9	11.0	10.7	133.2
Average snowy days (≥ 0.1 in)	13.1	10.9	8.0	5.7	0.6	0.0	0.0	0.0	0.1	2.1	9.0	12.9	62.4
Average relative humidity (%)	72.0	69.8	69.3	63.6	62.7	69.5	70.9	74.5	75.7	71.4	74.9	76.3	70.9
Average dew point °F (°C)	0.3 (−17.6)	4.5 (−15.3)	15.4 (−9.2)	25.5 (−3.6)	36.5 (2.5)	48.2 (9.0)	55.0 (12.8)	54.0 (12.2)	45.7 (7.6)	34.0 (1.1)	21.2 (−6.0)	7.2 (−13.8)	29.0 (−1.7)
Mean monthly sunshine hours	132.7	149.7	190.7	229.5	263.5	272.8	307.5	261.8	194.0	150.4	98.5	102.3	2,353.4
Percentage possible sunshine	47	52	52	56	57	58	64	60	51	44	35	38	53
Source: NOAA (relative humidity, dew point, and sun 1961–1990)

Climate data for Superior, Wisconsin (adjacent to Duluth, 1991–2020 normals, extremes 1909–present)
Month	Jan	Feb	Mar	Apr	May	Jun	Jul	Aug	Sep	Oct	Nov	Dec	Year
Record high °F (°C)	55 (13)	60 (16)	80 (27)	92 (33)	96 (36)	98 (37)	105 (41)	99 (37)	97 (36)	89 (32)	79 (26)	60 (16)	105 (41)
Mean maximum °F (°C)	41.3 (5.2)	45.0 (7.2)	56.7 (13.7)	70.4 (21.3)	82.3 (27.9)	87.3 (30.7)	91.1 (32.8)	89.4 (31.9)	83.3 (28.5)	74.7 (23.7)	57.1 (13.9)	43.0 (6.1)	92.7 (33.7)
Mean daily maximum °F (°C)	22.5 (−5.3)	26.9 (−2.8)	36.1 (2.3)	46.0 (7.8)	57.4 (14.1)	67.0 (19.4)	76.1 (24.5)	74.8 (23.8)	66.6 (19.2)	53.0 (11.7)	39.1 (3.9)	27.3 (−2.6)	49.4 (9.7)
Daily mean °F (°C)	14.1 (−9.9)	18.0 (−7.8)	28.5 (−1.9)	38.9 (3.8)	49.1 (9.5)	58.2 (14.6)	67.1 (19.5)	66.4 (19.1)	58.4 (14.7)	45.8 (7.7)	32.4 (0.2)	20.2 (−6.6)	41.4 (5.2)
Mean daily minimum °F (°C)	5.8 (−14.6)	9.1 (−12.7)	21.0 (−6.1)	31.8 (−0.1)	40.9 (4.9)	49.5 (9.7)	58.0 (14.4)	58.0 (14.4)	50.1 (10.1)	38.6 (3.7)	25.6 (−3.6)	13.1 (−10.5)	33.5 (0.8)
Mean minimum °F (°C)	−17.2 (−27.3)	−10.9 (−23.8)	−1.4 (−18.6)	18.3 (−7.6)	30.6 (−0.8)	39.2 (4.0)	47.1 (8.4)	47.0 (8.3)	35.3 (1.8)	25.1 (−3.8)	7.9 (−13.4)	−9.3 (−22.9)	−19.5 (−28.6)
Record low °F (°C)	−37 (−38)	−38 (−39)	−38 (−39)	−2 (−19)	11 (−12)	25 (−4)	34 (1)	31 (−1)	19 (−7)	9 (−13)	−19 (−28)	−32 (−36)	−38 (−39)
Average precipitation inches (mm)	0.81 (21)	0.89 (23)	1.41 (36)	2.64 (67)	3.37 (86)	4.56 (116)	3.88 (99)	3.92 (100)	3.39 (86)	3.17 (81)	2.12 (54)	1.29 (33)	31.45 (799)
Average snowfall inches (cm)	14.5 (37)	12.4 (31)	9.1 (23)	1.7 (4.3)	0.0 (0.0)	0.0 (0.0)	0.0 (0.0)	0.0 (0.0)	0.0 (0.0)	0.2 (0.51)	5.8 (15)	12.3 (31)	56.0 (142)
Average precipitation days (≥ 0.01 in)	7.1	5.6	7.1	8.8	11.6	11.5	10.4	9.6	9.9	9.7	8.1	7.0	106.4
Average snowy days (≥ 0.1 in)	6.8	5.2	3.7	1.6	0.0	0.0	0.0	0.0	0.0	0.1	3.1	5.7	26.2
Source: NOAA

=== 2012 flooding ===
On June 19–20, 2012, Duluth suffered the worst flood in its history, caused by nine in (230 mm) of rain in 30 hours. Combined with its rocky sediments, hard soil, and 44 streams and creeks, the city could not handle the massive rainfall. Mayor Don Ness declared a state of emergency, asking for national assistance. Minnesota Governor Mark Dayton declared a state of emergency, sending the National Guard and the Red Cross to assist in the relief efforts. Several sinkholes opened throughout the city, causing massive property damage. Several feet of standing water accumulated in many city alleys and parking lots. Streets were turned into rapids, and many roads split apart due to the heavy flow of water. A portion of West Skyline Parkway tumbled down the hill, isolating a neighborhood. The Saint Louis River, in Duluth's Fond du Lac neighborhood, flooded Highway 23, isolating that neighborhood as well and damaging roadways and bridges.

The Lake Superior Zoo flooded in the early hours of June 20; 11 barnyard animals drowned, as did a turkey vulture, a raven, and a snowy owl. The rising waters enabled a polar bear to escape her exhibit, though she was quickly found on zoo grounds, tranquilized, and moved to safety. Two harbor seals escaped the zoo grounds but were later found on Grand Avenue. All three animals were moved to Como Park Zoo in Saint Paul for a temporary but indeterminate amount of time. The polar bear was transferred to the Kansas City Zoo in 2012 as part of the American Zoological Association's (AZA) Species Survival Program breeding recommendation.

=== 2012 tornado ===
Tornadoes are uncommon in Duluth, considering its latitude and location next to the climate-moderating Lake Superior. But on August 9, 2012, at around 11 a.m., a tornado touched down on Minnesota Point. It had started as a waterspout in Superior Bay, two miles (3.2 km) from Sky Harbor Airport, but briefly found its way onto the sandbar's shoreline, making it a true tornado. It quickly dissipated but soon touched down again on Superior's Barker's Island, where it again quickly dissipated. It caused no serious damage; the tornado was categorized as an EF0 on the Enhanced Fujita Scale. At the time, the National Weather Service reported that it was Duluth's first tornado. Further investigation showed that more than 60 years ago, on May 26, 1958, Duluth had a "miniature tornado" that collapsed a garage and damaged two area lake cabins. It lasted only five minutes. The News Tribune reported a possible twister on July 11, 1935:

Swirling into the city on the wings of a torrential rain, a miniature tornado struck in the heart of the Gary-New Duluth district shortly before 8 a.m. yesterday, flattening a row of coal sheds [and] a frame garage and causing general damage to trees in the vicinity. The United States weather bureau had no means of officially recording the twister, the high wind having limited itself to the Gary-New Duluth district.

== Demographics ==
Historical population
Census	Pop.	Note	%±
1860	80		—
1870	3,131		3,813.8%
1880	3,483		11.2%
1890	33,115		850.8%
1900	52,969		60.0%
1910	78,466		48.1%
1920	98,917		26.1%
1930	101,453		2.6%
1940	101,065		−0.4%
1950	104,511		3.4%
1960	107,312		2.7%
1970	100,578		−6.3%
1980	92,811		−7.7%
1990	85,493		−7.9%
2000	86,918		1.7%
2010	86,265		−0.8%
2020	86,697		0.5%
2025 (est.)	88,330		1.9%
U.S. Decennial Census; 2020 Census

According to the 2023 American Community Survey, there were 38,843 estimated households in Duluth with an average of 2.15 persons per household. The city had a median household income of $61,163. Approximately 17.7% of the city's population lived at or below the poverty line. Duluth had an estimated 68.0% employment rate, with 44.4% of the population holding a bachelor's degree or higher and 95.8% holding a high school diploma.

The ACS 2023 one-year estimate reported that Duluth's residents were 74,622 (85.09%) White, 2,063 (2.35%) African American, 777 (0.89%) Native American, 2,093 (2.39%) Asian, 122 (0.14%) Pacific Islander, 1,355 (1.55%) from some other race, and 6,654 (7.59%) from two or more races. Hispanic or Latino people of any race were 2,424 (2.76%) of the population.

The median age in the city was 37.0 years.

=== Racial and ethnic composition ===
Historically, Duluth has been overwhelmingly populated by non-Hispanic whites. Since 1990, it has been home to a small but growing Black, Asian, and Hispanic population.

Duluth, Minnesota – racial and ethnic composition Note: the US Census treats Hispanic/Latino as an ethnic category. This table excludes Latinos from the racial categories and assigns them to a separate category. Hispanics/Latinos may be of any race.
Race / ethnicity (NH = non-Hispanic)	Pop. 1990	Pop. 2000	Pop. 2010	Pop. 2020	% 1990	% 2000	% 2010	% 2020
White alone (NH)	81,674	80,043	77,184	72,984	95.53%	92.09%	89.47%	84.18%
Black or African American alone (NH)	730	1,389	1,955	3,001	0.85%	1.60%	2.27%	3.46%
Native American or Alaska Native alone (NH)	1,779	2,056	2,011	2,077	2.08%	2.37%	2.33%	2.40%
Asian alone (NH)	760	989	1,287	1,381	0.89%	1.14%	1.49%	1.59%
Pacific Islander alone (NH)	—	25	28	34	—	0.03%	0.03%	0.04%
Other race alone (NH)	40	64	54	293	0.05%	0.07%	0.06%	0.34%
Mixed race or multiracial (NH)	—	1,431	2,441	4,869	—	1.65%	2.83%	5.62%
Hispanic or Latino (any race)	510	921	1,305	2,058	0.60%	1.06%	1.51%	2.37%
Total	85,493	86,918	86,265	86,697	100.00%	100.00%	100.00%	100.00%

=== 2020 census ===
As of the 2020 census, Duluth had a population of 86,697. The median age was 35.7 years. 17.9% of residents were under the age of 18, 5.4% were under 5, and 17.4% were 65 years of age or older. For every 100 females there were 96.7 males, and for every 100 females age 18 and over there were 95.3 males age 18 and over.

96.0% of residents lived in urban areas, while 4.0% lived in rural areas.

There were 37,104 households and 18,700 families in the city, of which 21.7% had children under the age of 18 living in them. Of all households, 35.9% were married-couple households, 23.6% were households with a male householder and no spouse or partner present, and 31.6% were households with a female householder and no spouse or partner present. About 37.5% of all households were made up of individuals and 13.8% had someone living alone who was 65 years of age or older.

The population density was 1,209.3 inhabitants per square mile (466.9/km^{2}). There were 39,762 housing units at an average density of 554.6 inhabitants per square mile (214.1/km^{2}); 6.7% were vacant. The homeowner vacancy rate was 1.0% and the rental vacancy rate was 6.1%.

Racial composition as of the 2020 census
Race	Number	Percent
White	73,672	85.0%
Black or African American	3,089	3.6%
American Indian and Alaska Native	2,211	2.6%
Asian	1,390	1.6%
Native Hawaiian and Other Pacific Islander	40	0.0%
Some other race	679	0.8%
Two or more races	5,616	6.5%
Hispanic or Latino (of any race)	2,058	2.4%

The most common ancestries in Duluth were German (24.0%), Norwegian (14.2%), Swedish (10.3%), Irish (9.8%), and Polish (6.7%). 95.2% of residents were born in the United States, and 72.7% were born in Minnesota. 95.2% spoke only English at home, and 1.7% spoke Spanish. 94.5% had at least a high school degree, and 39.0% had at least a bachelor's degree.

=== 2010 census ===
As of the 2010 census, there were 86,265 people, 35,705 households, and 18,680 families residing in the city. The population density was 1,272.5 inhabitants per square mile (491.3/km^{2}). There were 38,208 housing units at an average density of 563.6 inhabitants per square mile (217.6/km^{2}). The racial makeup of the city was 90.38% White, 2.30% African American, 2.47% Native American, 1.50% Asian, 0.03% Pacific Islander, 0.26% from some other races and 3.05% from two or more races. Hispanic or Latino people of any race were 1.51% of the population.

There were 35,705 households, of which 24.2% had children under the age of 18 living with them, 37.2% were married couples living together, 11.2% had a female householder with no husband present, 4.0% had a male householder with no wife present, and 47.7% were non-families. 35.1% of all households were made up of individuals, and 12.1% had someone living alone who was 65 years of age or older. The average household size was 2.23, and the average family size was 2.84.

The median age in the city was 33.6 years. 18.5% of residents were under the age of 18, 19.6% were between the ages of 18 and 24, 23.4% were from 25 to 44, 24.8% were from 45 to 64, and 13.8% were 65 years of age or older. The gender makeup of the city was 49.0% male and 51.0% female.

=== 2000 census ===
As of the 2000 census, there were 86,918 people, 35,500 households, and 19,918 families residing in the city. The population density was 1,278.1 inhabitants per square mile (493.5/km^{2}). There were 36,994 housing units at an average density of 544.0 inhabitants per square mile (210.0/km^{2}). The racial makeup of the city was 92.65% White, 1.63% African American, 2.44% Native American, 1.14% Asian, 0.03% Pacific Islander, 0.29% from some other races and 1.82% from two or more races. Hispanic or Latino people of any race were 1.06% of the population.

There were 35,500 households: 26.6% had children under the age of 18 living with them, 41.4% were married couples living together, 11.4% had a female householder with no husband present, and 43.9% were non-families. 34.5% of all households were made up of individuals and 13.3% had someone living alone who was 65 years of age or older. The average household size was 2.26, and the average family size was 2.90.

In the city, the population was spread out with 21.3% under the age of 18, 16.2% from 18 to 24, 26.1% from 25 to 44, 21.3% from 45 to 64, and 15.1% who were 65 years of age or older. The median age was 35 years. For every 100 females, there were 93.4 males. For every 100 females age 18 and over, there were 89.7 males.

The median income for a household in the city was $33,766, and the median income for a family was $46,394. Males had a median income of $35,182 versus $24,965 for females. The per capita income for the city was $18,969. About 8.6% of families and 15.5% of the population were below the poverty line, including 15.4% of those under age 18 and 9.5% of those age 65 or over.

== Economy ==
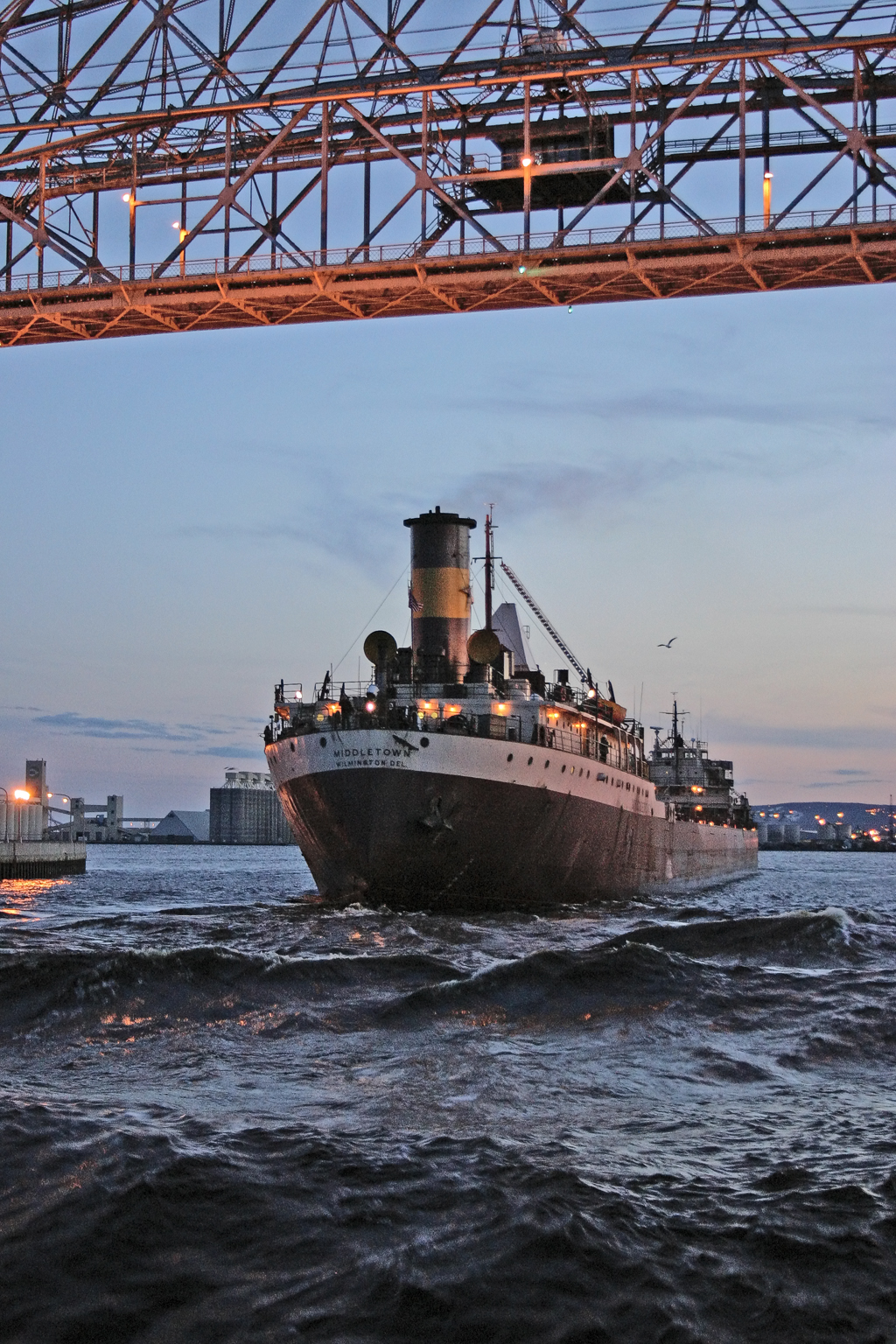
SS Middletown beneath Duluth's aerial lift bridge

Duluth is the major regional center for health care, higher education, retail, and business services not only of its own immediate area but also of a larger area encompassing northeastern Minnesota, northwestern Wisconsin, and the western Upper Peninsula of Michigan. It is also a major transportation center for the transshipment of coal, taconite, agricultural products, steel, limestone, and cement. In recent years, it has seen strong growth in the transshipment of wind turbine components coming and going from manufacturers in both Europe and North Dakota, as well as of oversized industrial machinery manufactured all around the world and destined for the tar sands oil extraction projects in northern Alberta. The Port of Duluth handles an average of 35 million short tons of cargo and nearly 900 vessel visits each year. 90 percent of the port's vessels are "Lakers", ships that ship goods exclusively among the upper four Great Lakes and are too large to transit the Welland Canal. The rest are "Salties", ships that can traverse the seaway all the way from the Atlantic Ocean.

The Twin Ports has attracted several new engineering firms, including TKDA, Barr Engineering, LHB, Enbridge, and Lake Superior Consulting, as well as new start-ups in various fields including Loll Designs and Epicurean, two sister companies that make eco-friendly furniture and kitchen utensils respectively, and microbrewery Bent Paddle. Women's clothing retail chain Maurices is also headquartered in Duluth, as are luggage manufacturers and suppliers Duluth Pack and Frost River. In 1989, the workwear and accessories brand Duluth Trading Company was founded on a barge in the city's shipping district. The company moved its headquarters to southern Wisconsin in 2000. Supermarket chain Super One Foods is also based in the Twin Ports, with its headquarters in neighboring Hermantown.

Duluth is a center for aquatic biology and aquatic science. The city is home to the EPA's Mid-Continent Ecology Division Laboratory and the University of Minnesota Duluth. These institutions have spawned many economically and scientifically important businesses that support Duluth's economy. A short list of these businesses includes ERA Laboratories, LimnoLogic, the ASci Corporation, Environmental Consulting and Testing, and Ecolab.

The city is popular for tourism. Duluth is a convenient base for trips to the scenic North Shore via Highway 61 and to fishing and wilderness destinations in Minnesota's far north, including the Superior National Forest, Voyageurs National Park, Lake Vermilion, and the Boundary Waters Canoe Area Wilderness. Tourists also may drive on the North Shore Scenic Drive to Gooseberry Falls State Park, Baptism Falls (Minnesota's largest waterfall), the vertical cliff of Palisade Head, Isle Royale National Park (reached via ferry), Grand Portage National Monument in Grand Portage, and High Falls of the Pigeon River (on the Canada–US border). Thunder Bay, Ontario, can be reached by following the highway into Canada along Lake Superior.

In 2006, a volunteer task force was formed to manage the spiraling retiree health care benefit obligations that were threatening to bankrupt the city. Mayor Don Ness called it "the single most important volunteer effort in our city's history". After reforming and restructuring the benefits and a court case that went all the way to the Minnesota Supreme Court, in 2013 the liability stood at an estimated $191 million. In 2014, Ness announced "a full solution for the retiree health care issue that once threatened to bankrupt our city".

=== Top employers ===
According to the city's 2024 Comprehensive Annual Financial Report, Duluth's 10 largest employers are:

#	Employer	Type of Business	# of Employees
1	Essentia Health (St. Mary's/Duluth Clinic)	Healthcare / hospital	9,298
2	St. Luke's Hospital	Healthcare / hospital	3,685
3	St. Louis County	Government	2,258
4	Cirrus Aircraft	Aviation	1,600
5	Allete (Minnesota Power)	Electric utility	1,404
6	Duluth Public Schools ISD No. 709	Education	1,108
7	Duluth Air National Guard Base	Military	1,019
8	University of Minnesota Duluth	Education	1,012
9	United Healthcare	Insurance	900
10	City of Duluth	Government	895

=== Aviation ===
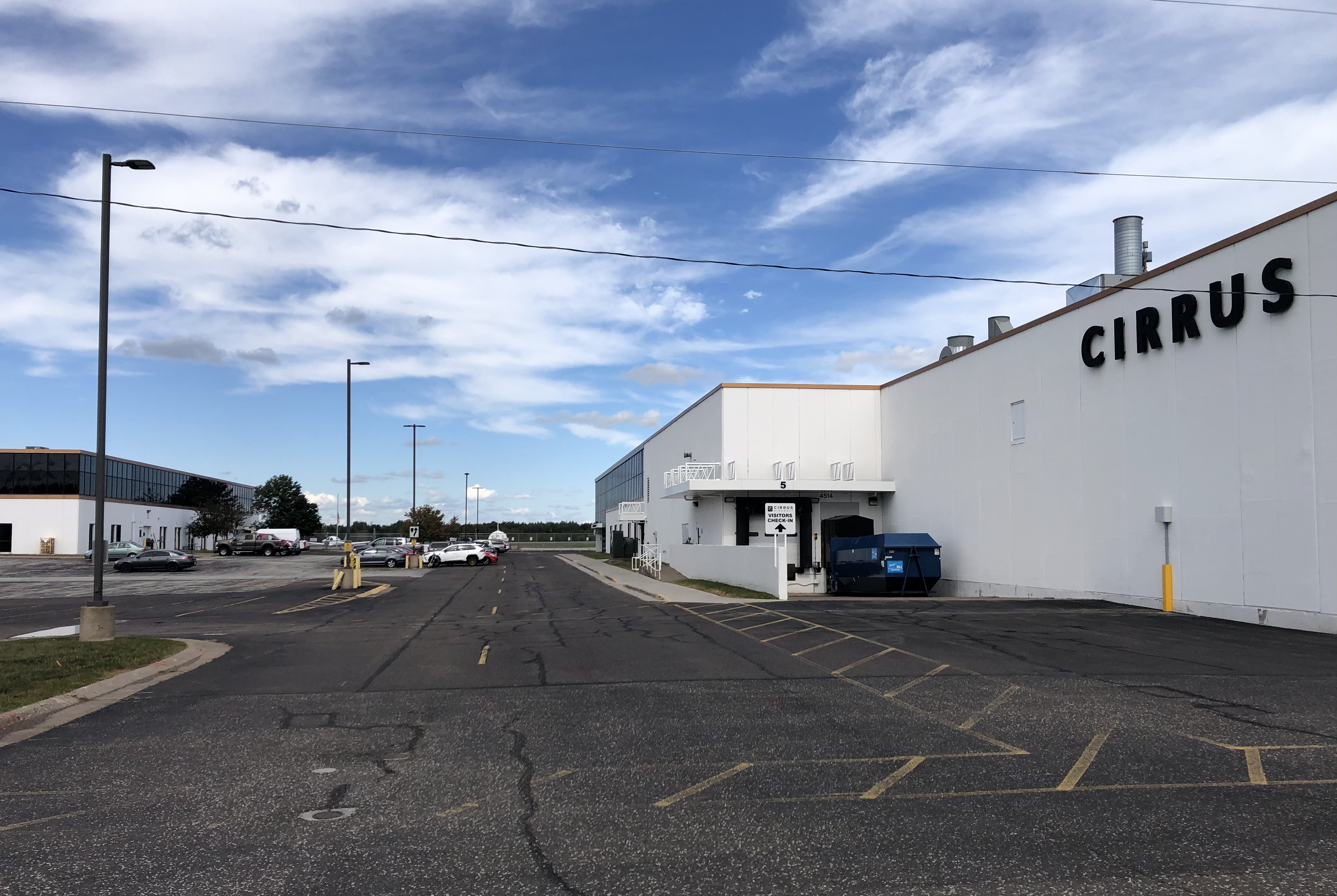
Cirrus's Duluth headquarters and main manufacturing facilities

Several multinational aviation corporations operate near Duluth. Since 1994, the city has been home to the headquarters and main manufacturing facilities of Cirrus Aircraft, a company with nearly 1,600 Duluth employees (as of 2023) building the world's best-selling general aviation aircraft, the SR22, and the world's first single-engine personal jet, the Vision SF50. James Fallows, national correspondent for The Atlantic, said that Cirrus' rapid growth in Duluth over the years "was a major, major factor in the town's modern emergence". Former mayor Gary Doty called the arrival of Cirrus in the mid-1990s a "crucial turning point" for Duluth and said it was "the catalyst for more positive attitudes about the city... If that hadn't happened, then we might really have been in a tailspin." As of 2024, the company is Duluth's largest manufacturer and third-largest employer. In January 2012, another aircraft manufacturer, Kestrel Aircraft, maker of the K-350 turboprop plane and later known as ONE Aviation, moved to the Twin Ports. In October of that year, AAR Corp opened an aircraft repair and maintenance facility at the Duluth airport. Both companies ceased operations in the region during the COVID-19 pandemic.

In January 2013, the Duluth International Airport opened a new terminal, now named the U.S. Representative James L. Oberstar Terminal after the late Jim Oberstar.

The Air National Guard's 148th Fighter Wing is at the Duluth Air National Guard Base and is the city's sixth-largest employer as of 2022. It is one of a handful of National Guard units with an active association which, in the 148th's case, means having the capability to provide training for Air Force pilots. The 179th Fighter Squadron is a unit of the 148th.

Minnesota's largest airshow, the Duluth Air & Aviation Expo, takes place each year on the grounds of Duluth International Airport.

== Arts and culture ==
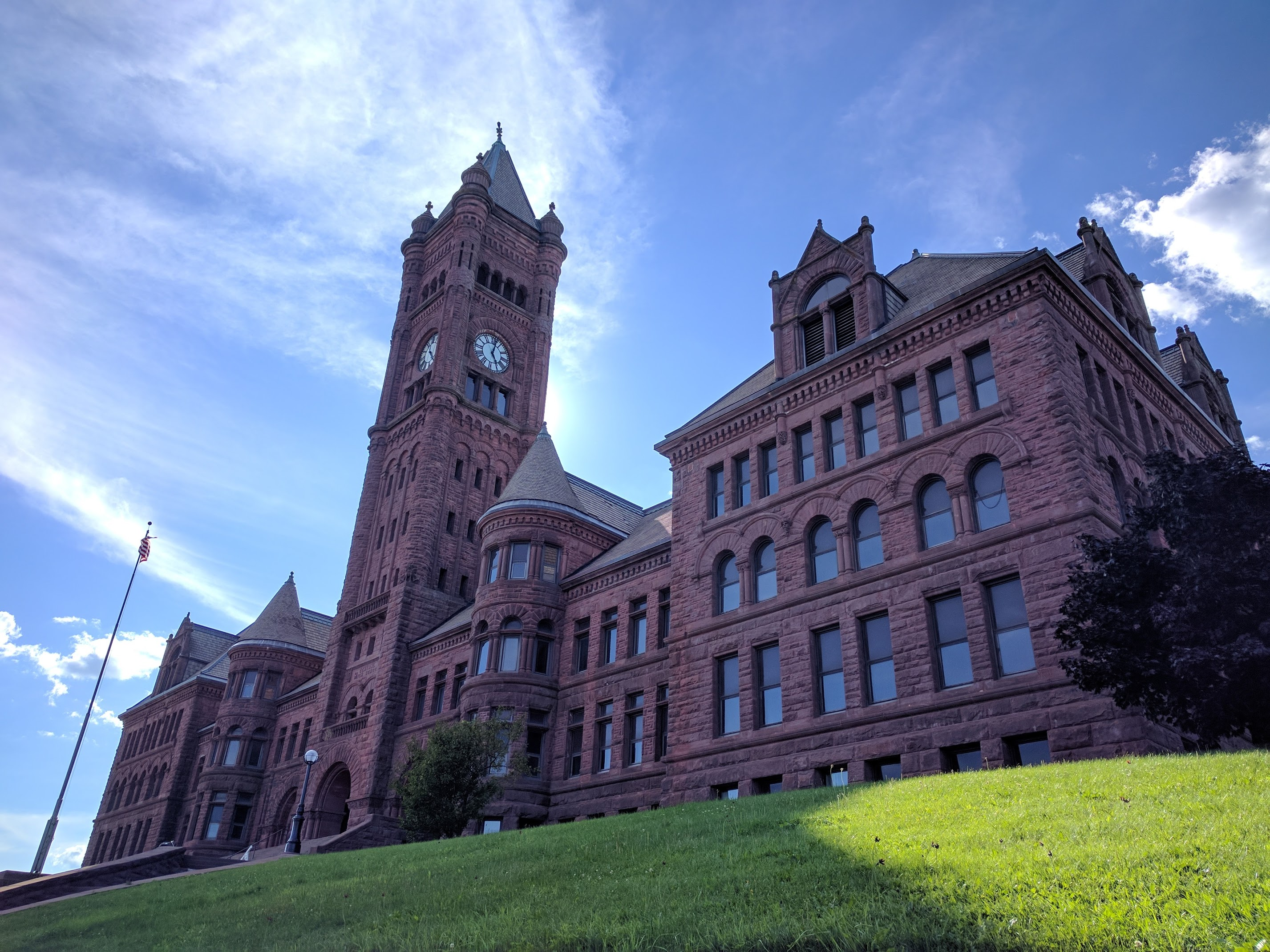
Historic Old Central High School

Duluth hosts a variety of museums and cultural institutions. It is the starting point of the North Shore of Lake Superior scenic route that runs from Duluth, at the southwestern end of the lake, to Thunder Bay and Nipigon in the north and Sault Ste. Marie in the east. The route was already a popular tourist destination after 1855, when the Great Lakes lock system first allowed steamboats onto the lake and eastern tourists began to travel onto Lake Superior for recreational purposes. By the mid-1870s, many excursion boats, coastal steamers, and ferries ran along the North Shore, primarily out of Duluth and Thunder Bay. After docking in Duluth, tourists often canoed or were ferried up the North Shore, staying in hunting and fishing camps and later hotels and small cabins.

The Duluth Children's Museum, founded in 1930, is the fifth-oldest of its kind in the U.S. Located in Lincoln Park, it offers interactive exhibits and educational programming, with a collection of over 25,000 artifacts focusing on regional history, including Indigenous and immigrant cultures. Other museums include the Tweed Museum of Art at the University of Minnesota Duluth and the Karpeles Manuscript Library Museum. The Historic Old Central High School, built in 1892 and notable for its 230-foot clock tower modeled after Big Ben, was once home to a local museum. Listed on the National Register of Historic Places, it is an example of Romanesque architecture and was sold to developers in 2022.

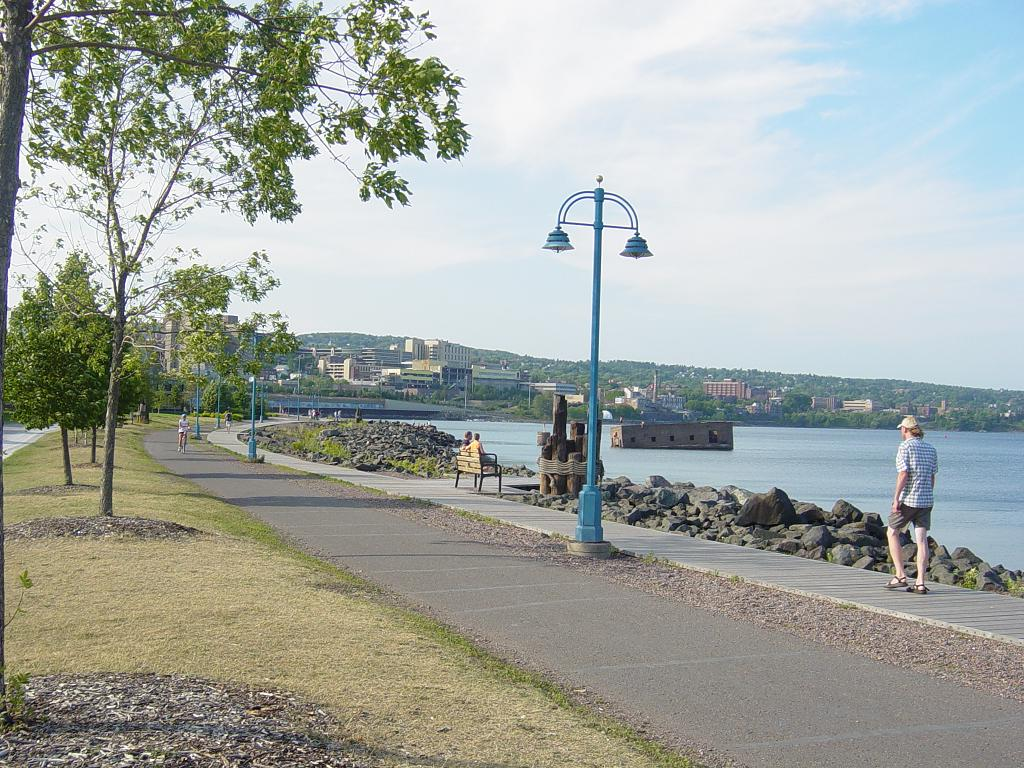
Duluth Canal Park Lakewalk

The Duluth Art Institute, housed in the Duluth Depot downtown, features galleries, studios, and educational programming. The city is also home to the Minnesota Ballet and Duluth Superior Symphony Orchestra. In the summer, free concerts are held in Chester Park. The Bayfront Blues Festival is held in early August. Several local theater companies operate in Duluth, including the Duluth Playhouse, founded in 1914 and one of the oldest continuously operating community theaters in the U.S. It stages performances across multiple venues, including the restored Nor Shor Theatre, a historic 600-seat movie palace reopened in 2018. The Playhouse also hosts a respected theater education program.

Since 2004, Duluth has celebrated Pride with a parade on Labor Day weekend. Since 1998, the city has held the Homegrown Music Festival in the first week of May; it features over 170 local musical acts performing across the city. The Junior Achievement High School ROCKS–Battle of the Bands showcases middle-school and high-school bands from central Minnesota to the Canada–U.S. border and northern Wisconsin at the Duluth Entertainment Convention Center (DECC) in mid-April. Duluth also hosts the Northeastern Minnesota Book Awards, honoring books about the region.

=== Attractions ===
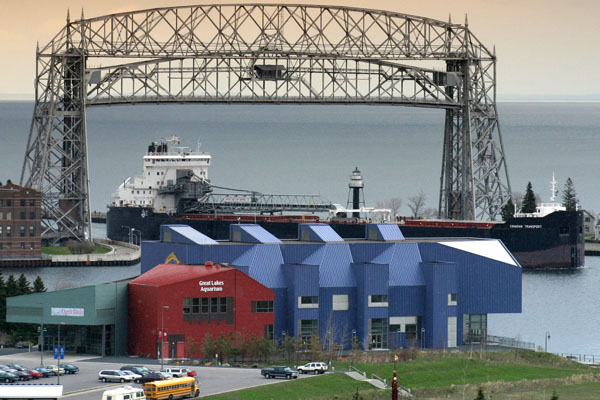
Great Lakes Aquarium with lift bridge in background

Once a warehouse district, Canal Park has become a hub of restaurants, shops, and recreation. A 2.6-mile (4.2 km) walking path offers views of Lake Superior, Park Point's sand dunes, and the Aerial Lift Bridge, which spans the Duluth Ship Canal. The seven-mile Lakewalk passes landmarks like Leif Erikson Park and the Duluth Rose Garden, ending at Bayfront Festival Park, which hosts concerts and events.

Among Duluth's most visited attractions is the Great Lakes Aquarium, a freshwater-focused facility showcasing ecosystems such as the Amazon River and Great Lakes Basin. Nearby, the Lake Superior Maritime Visitor Center features shipwreck artifacts and interactive exhibits, including a replica ship's pilot house. The wreck of the Thomas Wilson, an early-20th-century whaleback ore boat, lies underwater less than 1 mile (1.6 km) outside the Duluth Ship Canal. The SS William A. Irvin, a retired U.S. Steel flagship, now serves as a floating museum.

The Lake Superior Railroad Museum, in the Duluth Union Depot, houses a collection of locomotives and rolling stock, including the William Crooks and a rare Yellowstone locomotive. From there, the North Shore Scenic Railroad operates heritage excursions to Two Harbors, Minnesota, during the summer and fall. Other notable historic and cultural sites include the Fitger's Brewery Complex, established in the 19th century and now home to shops, restaurants, and a brewery museum; the Glensheen Historic Estate, a 38-room Jacobean mansion on Lake Superior's shore; and the Lake Superior Zoo, which spans 16 acres and features species from around the world.

Duluth's natural attractions are numerous. Enger Tower, atop Enger Hill, provides panoramic views of the region. Hawk Ridge, on Skyline Parkway, is a renowned bird-watching site during the autumn raptor migration. Gichi-Ode' Akiing Park, named for the Ojibwe for "a grand heart place", includes a memorial to Kechewaishke, whose 1849 petition helped preserve Anishinaabe land in the area.

=== Events ===
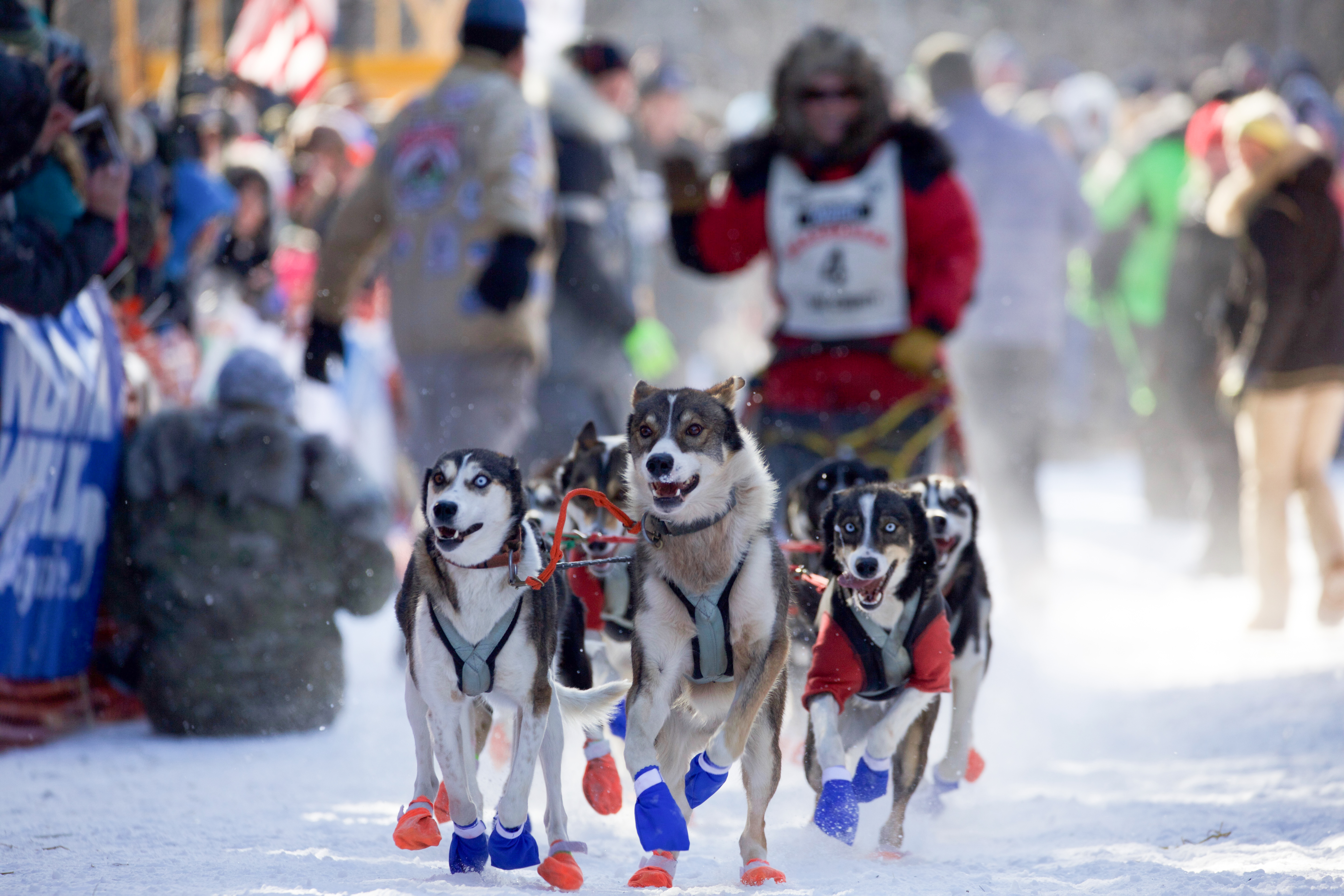
2017 John Beargrease Dogsled Marathon

The city hosts several annual events. The Duluth Airshow, Minnesota's largest, brings military and civilian flight teams to Duluth International Airport. The John Beargrease Sled Dog Marathon, held in January, is one of the longest races in the lower 48 states and serves as a preparatory event for the Iditarod Trail Sled Dog Race. In May, the Magic Smelt Parade celebrates the smelt run with music and costume, modeled after New Orleans-style Second Line Parade.

Grandma's Marathon, founded in 1977, attracts runners from around the world to a lakeside course between Two Harbors and Canal Park; the same route is used for the North Shore Inline Marathon. In November, the Christmas City of the North Parade kicks off the holiday season with marching bands and floats. During November and December, the Bentleyville Tour of Lights transforms Bayfront Festival Park into a walk-through holiday display featuring over five million lights.

== Sports ==
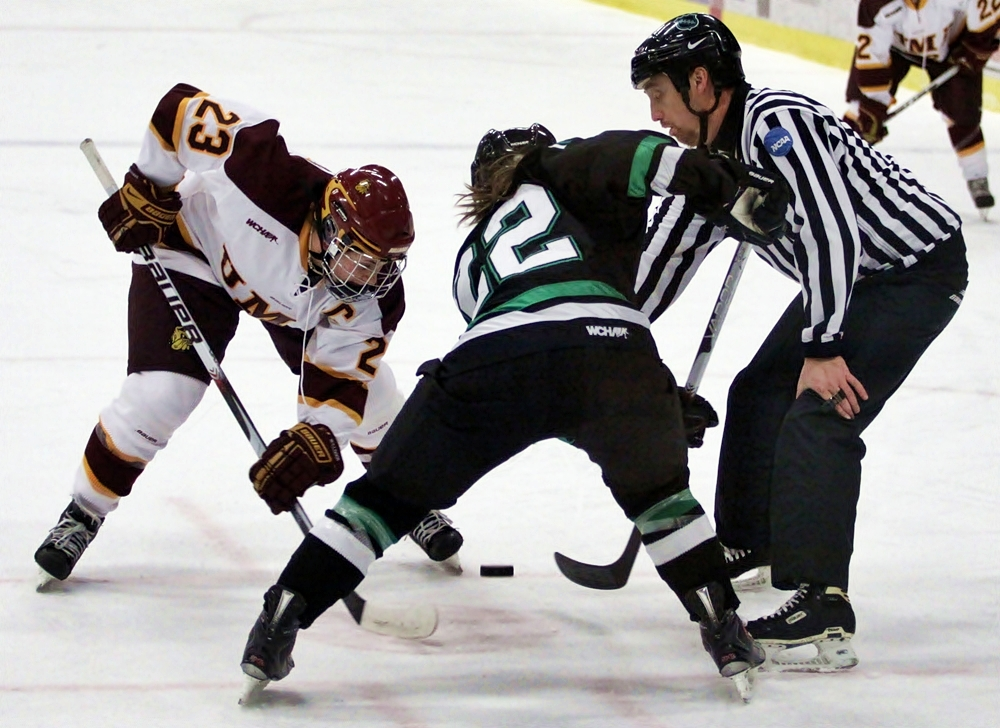
Saara Niemi playing with the Minnesota Duluth Bulldogs in 2010

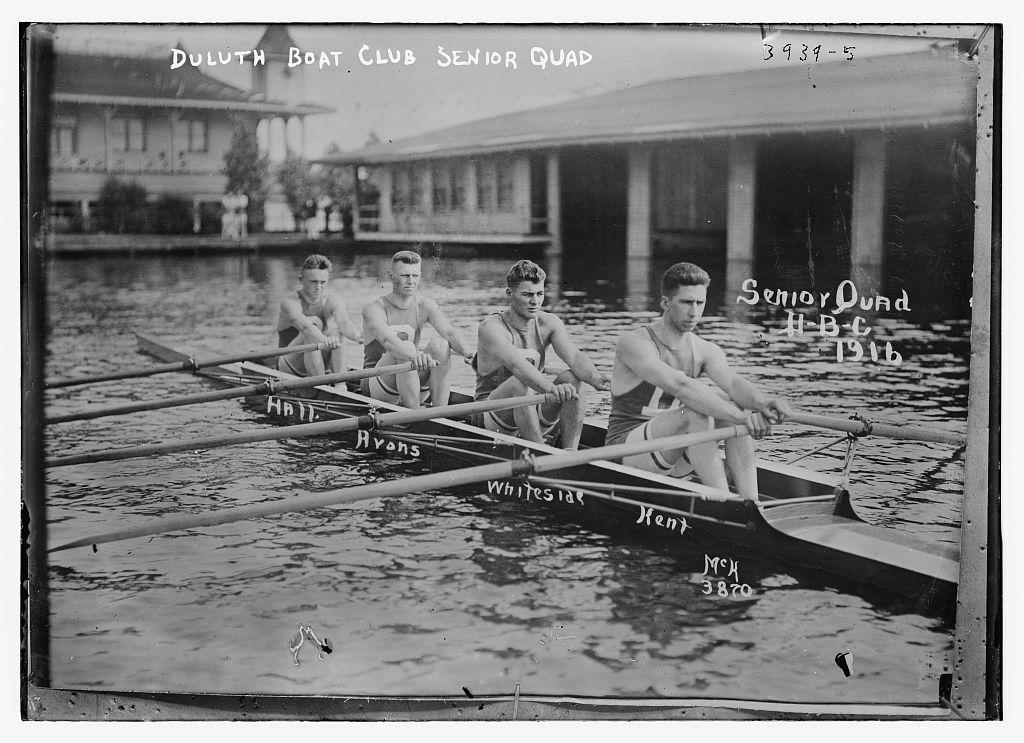
Duluth Boat Club Senior Quad, c. 1915–1920

Duluth has a varied sports history, including hosting two early National Football League teams: the Duluth Kelleys/Eskimos (1923–1925; 1926–1927), the latter inspiring the 2008 film Leatherheads. In baseball, the Duluth–Superior Dukes played at Wade Stadium in the independent Northern League from 1993 to 2002 and won the 1997 championship; an earlier Northern League was also in operation off and on from 1902 to 1971 in the city. Duluth also supports several amateur baseball teams, including the Duluth Xpress, Twin Ports North Stars, and the collegiate summer team Duluth Huskies, who have played at Wade Stadium since 2003. Local high schools also field competitive teams. In boxing, Horton's Gym (later Jungle Boy Boxing Gym) trained notable Minnesota fighters including Zach "Jungle Boy" Walters and Andy Kolle.

Duluth also has a history of hosting arena football teams. The city first had the Duluth-Superior Lumberjacks in the Indoor Football League (1999–2000) and held games at the DECC Arena. The Arena League awarded the city a team, the Duluth Harbor Monsters (2024–2025), as the second of the four original teams over the league's first expansion phase in 2023, also played at the DECC Arena. After coming off their back-to-back Arena League championship seasons, when they also hosted both ArenaMania I and II, that same Harbor Monsters team was rebranded as the Minnesota Monsters as it moved operations from The Arena League to Arena Football One. The Monsters played at AMSOIL Arena in the 2026 season before relocating to the Minneapolis–Saint Paul area.

In hockey, the University of Minnesota Duluth Bulldogs men's and women's teams have earned national acclaim. The men's team, with notable alumni such as Brett Hull and Matt Niskanen, won NCAA national championships in 2011, 2018, and 2019, playing before large crowds at AMSOIL Arena. The women's team has won five NCAA titles (2001–03, 2008, 2010), with memorable wins including a triple-overtime victory in 2010 and a dramatic double-overtime goal in 2003. The city has also hosted multiple Frozen Four tournaments.

Other amateur sports are well-represented. The Duluth Boat Club, established in 1886, has a storied rowing history, with 20 national championships, and remains active in regattas. Duluth FC plays in the National Premier Soccer League at Denfeld High School's stadium. Dynamo Duluth has been a leading bandy team, claiming the 2013 American Bandy League championship and the 2009 North American Cup in rink bandy. Harbor City Roller Derby, founded in 2007, is the region's first women's flat-track roller derby league. Curling is also prominent; the Duluth Curling Club, founded in 1891 and housed in the DECC since 1976, produced the 2018 men's Olympic curling gold medal team.

== Parks and recreation ==
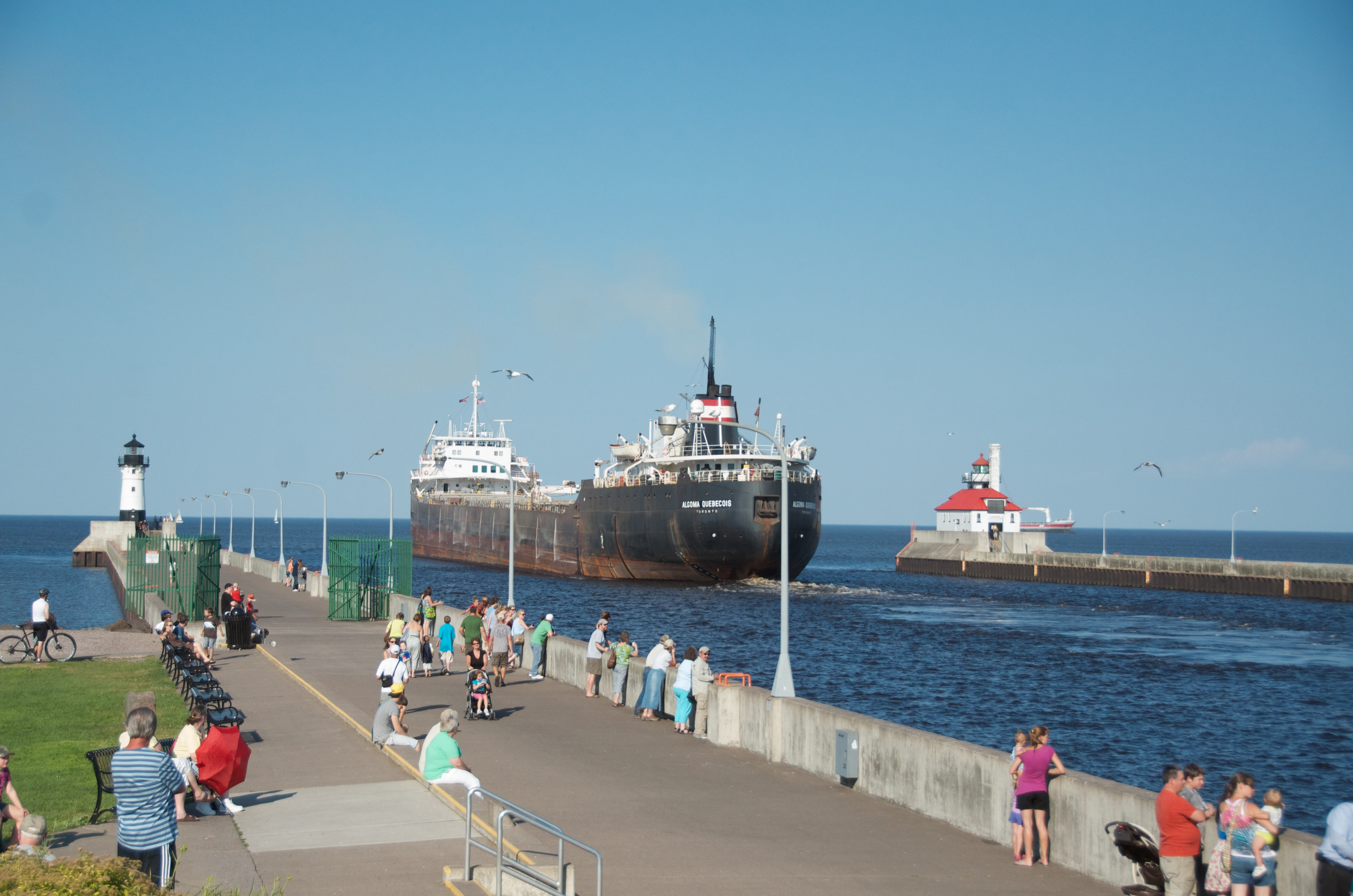
Lake freighter Algoma Quebecois exiting the Duluth harbor

Duluth has numerous parks, including six parks on Lake Superior: Leif Erikson Park, which includes a lakeside rose garden; Brighton Beach Park; Canal Park on Park Point; the Lakewalk (connecting Canal Park and Leif Erikson Park via the lakeshore); and Lafayette Park on Park Point. The Park Point Recreation Area near the end of Park Point has a community center, numerous pavilions, a swimming beach, sand volleyball court, picnic tables and grills, and a boat launch. Park Point Pine Forest, at the tip of Park Point, is popular for bird-watching in the spring and fall when shorebirds use the area as a resting point during their migration. A shipping schedule of ships entering the harbor is available, as well as five live cams including a cam of the canal, the lift bridge, and the beach.

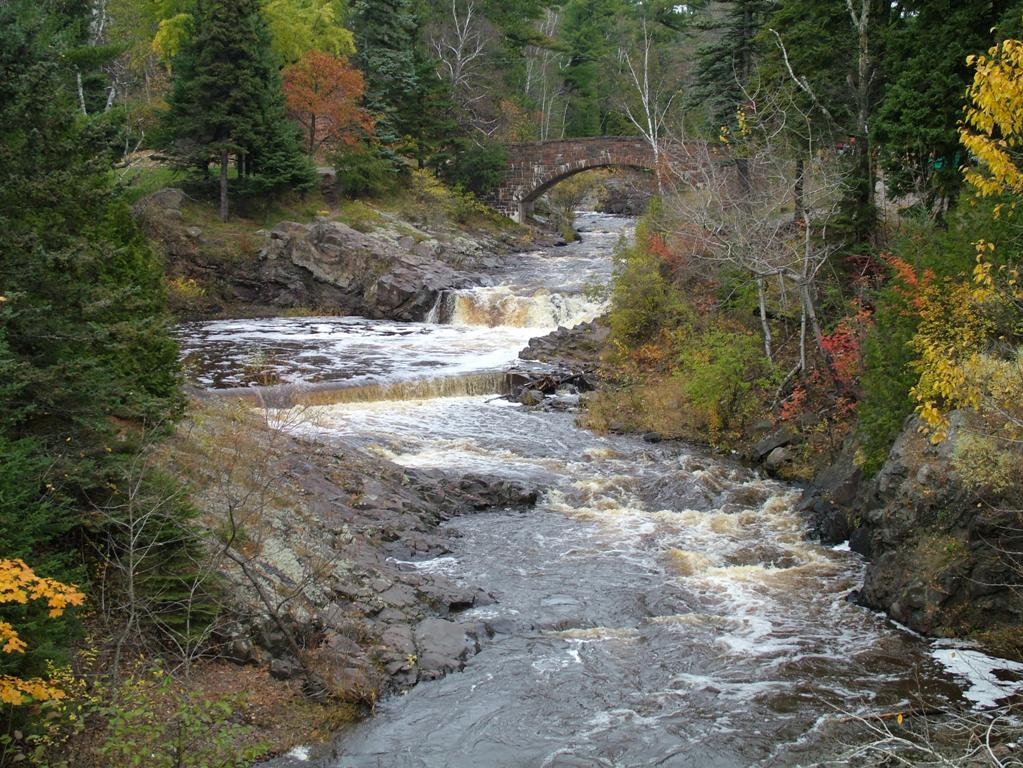
Lester River, one of 28 rivers and streams that run through Duluth

Other parks include historic Lester Park, one of Duluth's most popular parks. Just upstream from where Amity Creek joins the Lester River, a large, deep pool has formed that attracts cliff diving. Amity Creek is the site of The Seven Bridges Road, a four-mile section of Skyline Parkway where it follows Amity Creek from the top of the bluffs down to Lake Superior. The 400-foot drop has resulted in a long cascade of waterfalls.

Duluth's other parks include Congdon Park, Hartley Park, Chester Park, Bayfront Festival Park, Cascade Park, Enger Park, Lincoln Park, Brewer Park, Fairmount Park, Indian Point Park, Magney–Snively Park, and Fond du Lac Park, as well as some small neighborhood parks and athletic fields. Lester Park, Congdon Park, Hartley Park, and Chester Park have trail systems, and three of these—all but Hartley—also have waterfalls, as does Lincoln Park. Hartley Park also has a nature center. Lester Park and Enger Park have public golf courses. Fairmount Park has the Lake Superior Zoo. Jay Cooke State Park is a Minnesota state park about ten miles (16 km) southwest of Duluth. The park is along the Saint Louis River and is one of Minnesota's 10 most visited state parks.

=== Leif Erikson Park ===
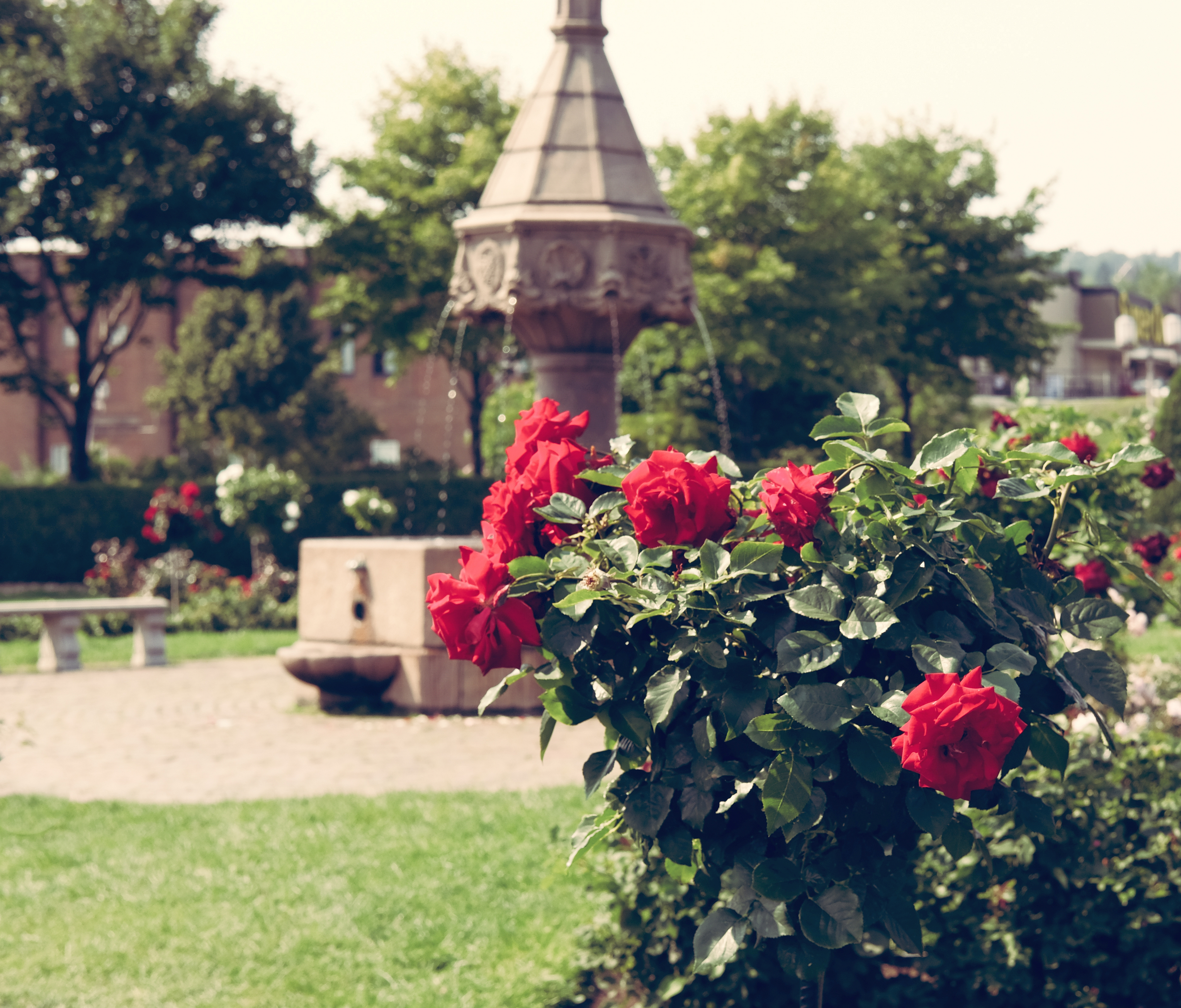
Duluth Rose Garden in Leif Erikson Park

The Leif Erikson, a 42 feet (13 m) replica Viking ship built in Norway to commemorate the voyage of Norse explorer Leif Erikson to North America in c. 1000 CE, was brought to Duluth in 1927 by invitation of Norwegian-American businessman H. H. Borgen. After completing a 6,700 miles (10,800 km) transatlantic journey, the ship was greeted by large crowds and soon purchased by local resident Emil Olson, who donated it to the city. It was displayed in what became Leif Erikson Park, but decades of exposure and vandalism led to severe deterioration. In 1980, the idea of a ceremonial Viking burning inspired Olson's grandson, Will Borg, to lead a restoration effort. Despite fundraising and partial restorations starting in 1991, progress was slow, and although the ship was declared fully restored in 2015, it remained in storage as of 2022 due to the absence of a proper display structure.

Leif Erikson Park also includes the Duluth Rose Garden, a six-acre formal English-style garden perched above a highway tunnel along Lake Superior. Featuring over 3,000 rose bushes and 12,000 additional plantings, the garden is known for its labeled varieties, informational signage, and scenic design, including brick paths, an antique horse fountain, and a marble gazebo. The space is a popular site for summer weddings and community gatherings. In 1956, a bronze statue of Leif Erikson by John Karl Daniels was added to the park. The statue was donated by the Norwegian American League and members of the community.

=== Recreation ===
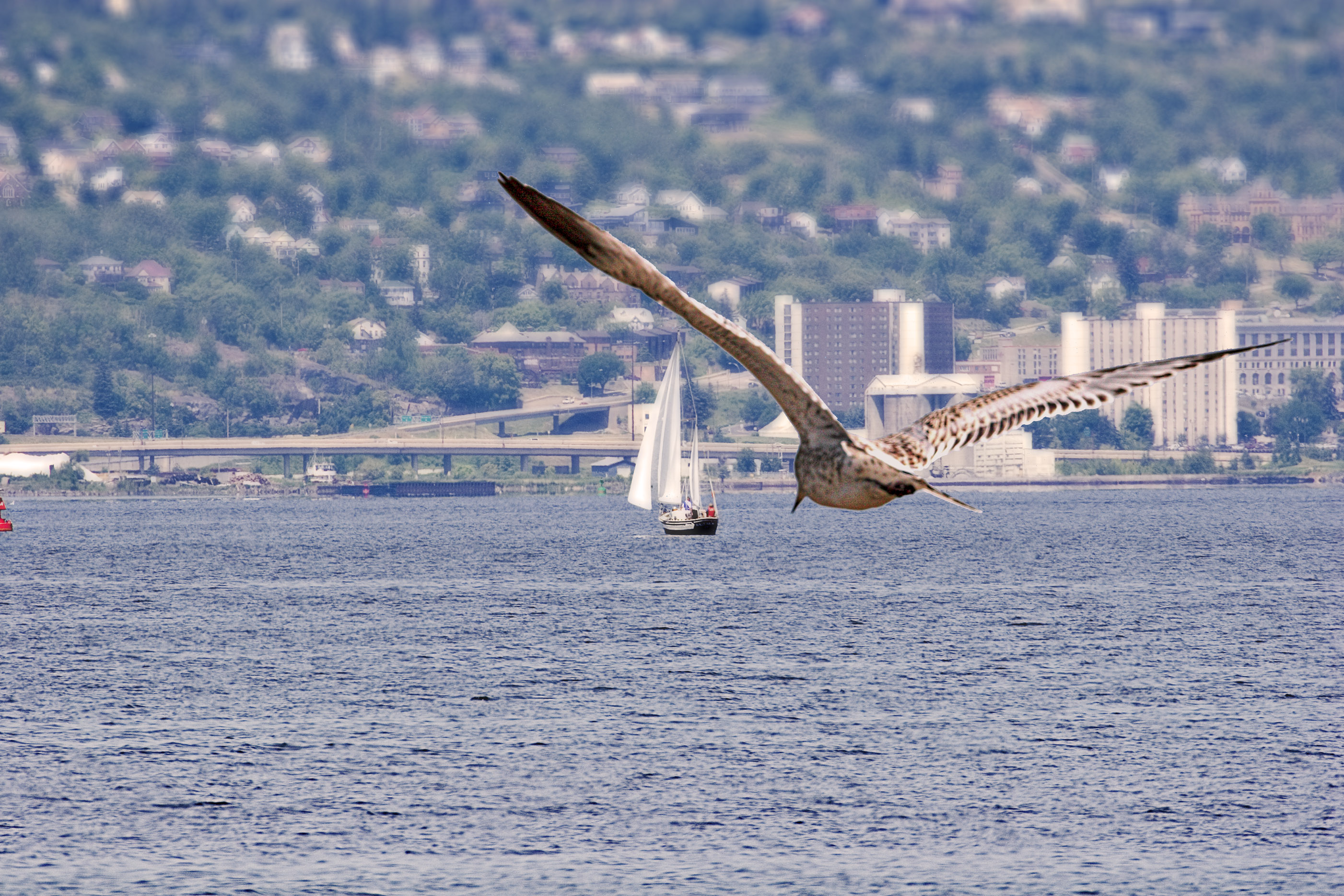
Gull and sailboat in Duluth harbor

Duluth offers numerous outdoor activities, including fishing, hiking, skiing, sailing, canoeing, kayaking, surfing, trail running, and mountain biking.

The city features two public golf courses (including Ridgeview Country Club), multiple private clubs, public and private tennis courts, and numerous indoor and outdoor ice rinks, including curling facilities. The University of Minnesota Duluth's Recreational Sports Outdoor Program provides instruction in kayaking, stand-up paddleboarding, canoeing, sea kayaking, and rock climbing, and organizes events like the St. Louis River Whitewater Rendezvous. Duluth also hosts a 339-mile (63 km) segment of the Superior Hiking Trail and the 10-mile (16 km) Piedmont mountain biking trail, offering scenic views of the surrounding natural landscape.

Skiing is popular in the area, particularly at Spirit Mountain, Minnesota's second-highest ski hill at 700 feet (210 m). Nordic skiing is also well supported, with many parks providing groomed trails for skate and classic styles. Chester Bowl, a city-owned ski area, offers extremely affordable lift tickets. Duluth's active sailing and rowing community is centered around local yacht and rowing clubs. The city hosts the biennial Trans Superior Race, one of the world's longest freshwater sailing races at almost 390 mi (630 km), and triennial Tall Ships festivals, which draw hundreds of thousands of spectators.

Surfing on Lake Superior has grown in popularity, with spots like Park Point, Lester River, and Stoney Point favored by locals when strong northeast winds produce adequate waves. Duluth is also known for Lake Superior agate hunting, particularly along Park Point, where natural forces renew the shoreline annually. The state's official gemstone, agates are found throughout the area's beaches, streams, and gravel cuts, with guidebooks available for enthusiasts.

== Government ==
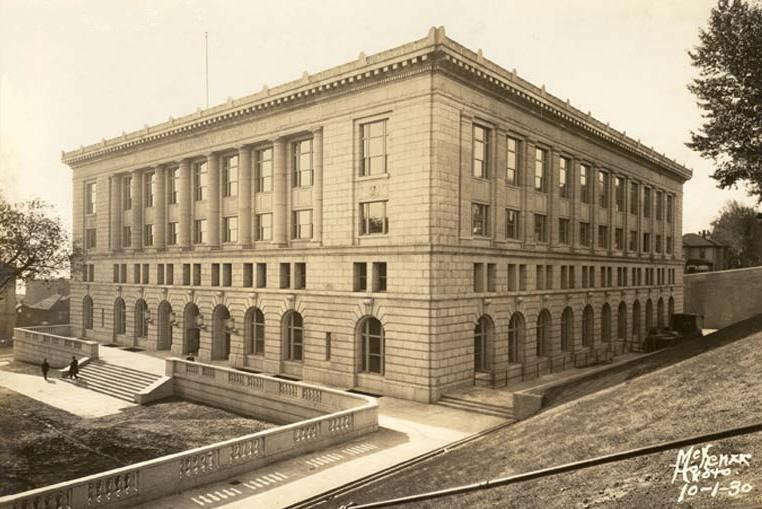
The Gerald W. Heaney Federal Building-Courthouse and Custom House near the Saint Louis County Courthouse, 1930

Duluth is in Minnesota's 8th congressional district, represented by Republican Pete Stauber. It has a mayor–council form of government. The mayor is Roger Reinert, who took office in 2024 after defeating incumbent Emily Larson, the city's first female mayor. The Democratic–Farmer–Labor Party has controlled the mayor's office continuously since 1975. Duluth's longest-serving mayor was Samuel F. Snively, serving from 1921 to 1937. He is remembered for his initiatives creating parks and boulevards, such as the Seven Bridges Road and Skyline Parkway.

Duluth is in Minnesota's 8th Senate District, represented in the Minnesota Senate by Jen McEwen and in the Minnesota House of Representatives by Liish Kozlowski (District 8B) and Peter Johnson (District 8A)—all members of the Democratic–Farmer–Labor Party, which has long dominated the city's (as well as the state's) politics.

=== Local government ===
The City Administration makes policy proposals to a nine-member City Council. Duluth's five representational districts are divided into 36 precincts. Each district elects its own councilor. There are also four at-large councilors, representing the entire city. The City Council elects a president who presides over meetings.

The council also oversees the city's financial operations, including the annual budget, and serves as a check against the mayor in a mayor-council government model.

The current president of the council is Lynn Marie Nephew.

Presidential election results 1960–2024

Precinct General Election Results
Year	Republican	Democratic	Third parties
2024	29.5% 14,786	68.2% 34,172	2.4% 1,180
2020	29.0% 14,560	68.4% 34,384	2.6% 1,329
2016	30.5% 14,764	59.6% 28,845	9.9% 4,807
2012	29.7% 14,842	67.4% 33,660	2.9% 1,459
2008	29.4% 15,253	68.6% 35,611	2.0% 1,087
2004	31.5% 16,463	67.3% 35,177	1.2% 550
2000	31.2% 14,082	61.7% 27,362	7.1% 3,595
1996	27.8% 11,326	62.3% 25,335	9.9% 4,035
1992	25.5% 11,836	55.6% 25,794	18.9% 8,754
1988	34.5% 14,716	65.5% 27,879	0.0% 0
1984	33.2% 15,451	66.8% 31,152	0.0% 0
1980	30.6% 14,265	56.7% 26,411	12.7% 5,928
1976	37.7% 17,686	59.8% 28,000	2.5% 1,168
1972	45.2% 20,957	53.2% 24,626	1.6% 739
1968	30.1% 13,638	66.8% 30,313	3.1% 1,412
1964	28.2% 13,411	71.3% 33,965	0.5% 235
1960	43.1% 21,498	56.1% 27,965	0.8% 417

== Education ==
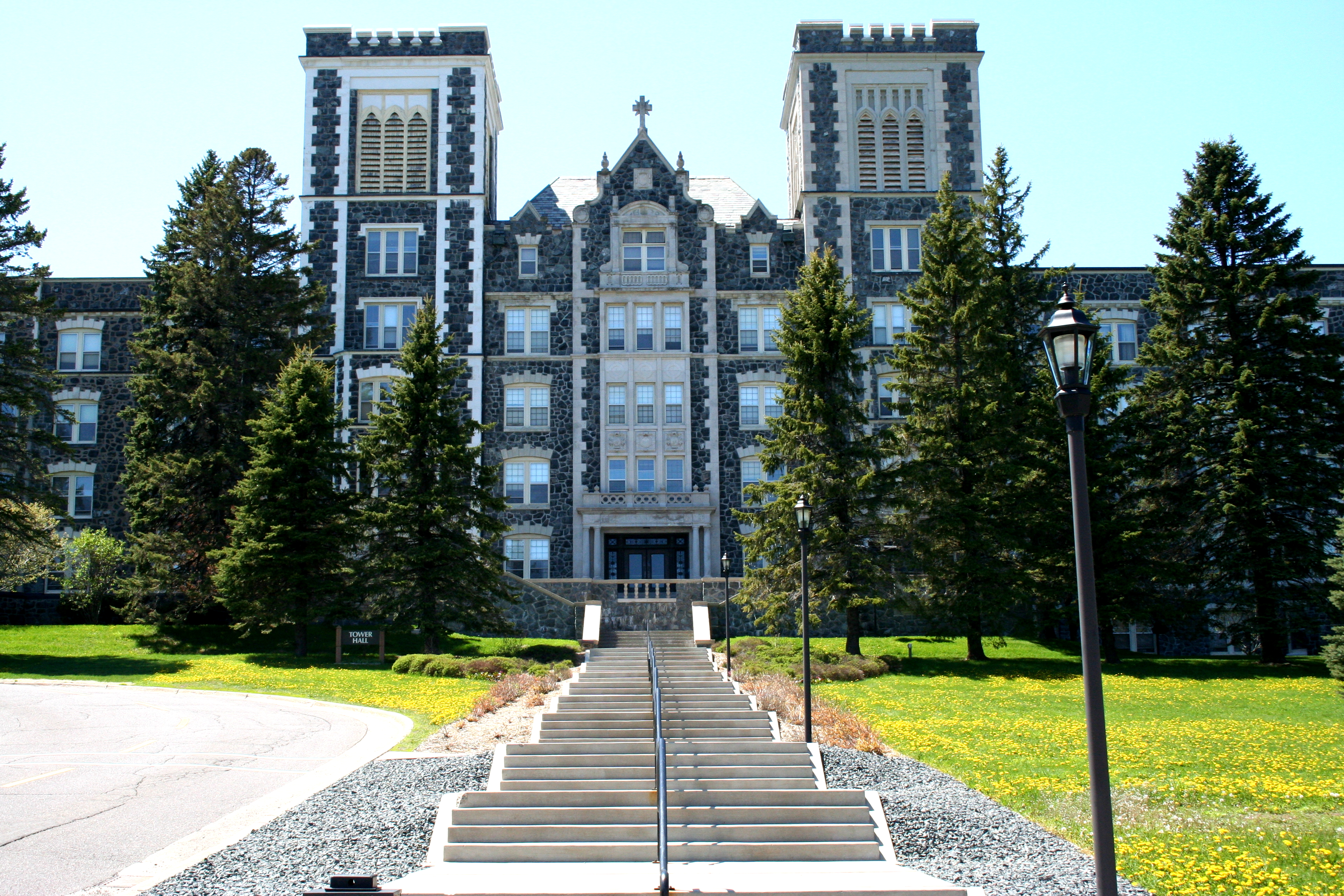
Tower Hall at The College of St. Scholastica

Local colleges and universities include the University of Minnesota Duluth (UMD); the UMD campus includes a medical school. The UMD Bulldogs won the Division I National Hockey Championship in 2011, 2018 and 2019. Other schools include The College of St. Scholastica, Lake Superior College, and Duluth Business University. The University of Wisconsin–Superior and Northwood Technical College are in nearby Superior, Wisconsin.

The Duluth Public Schools school district covers the majority of the municipality, and most public schools are administered by Duluth Public Schools. The schools have open enrollment. ISD 709 (Independent School District number 709) is now undertaking a reconstruction of all area schools under a program called the "Red Plan." The Red Plan's goals are the reconstruction of some older schools (to meet new educational guidelines) and the construction of four new school buildings. The new schools will result in the redistricting of many students. As of 2009, the Red Plan was and is being contested in court by some citizens because of the cost of implementing the plan and because of the choice of construction management contractor.

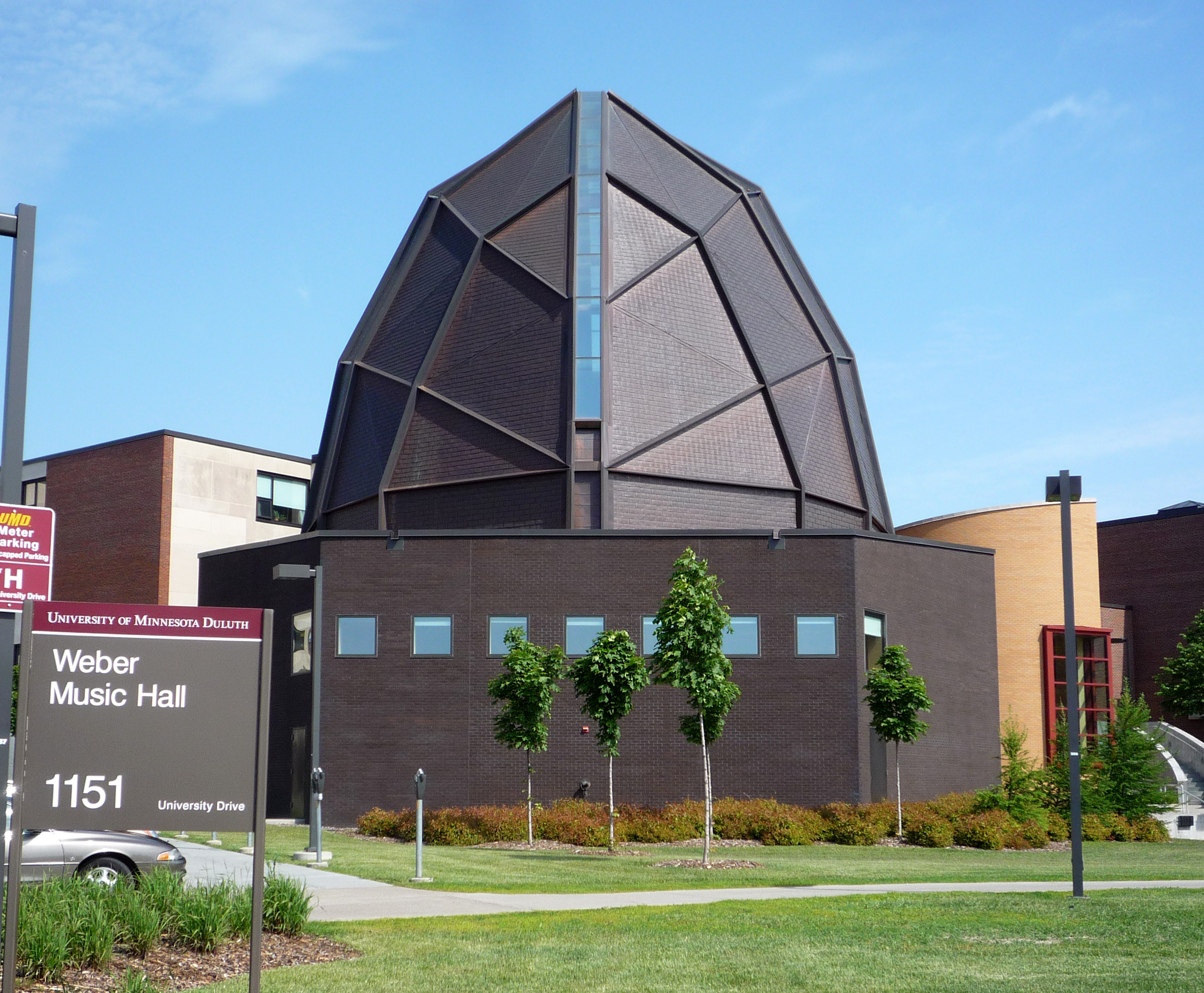
Weber Music Hall at the University of Minnesota Duluth

One other school district, the Proctor Public School District, covers a small part of southwest Duluth. Several independent and public charter schools also serve Duluth students. The largest is Duluth Edison Charter Schools, a public charter school covering grades K-8. Marshall School, a private college preparatory school founded as Duluth Cathedral in 1904, covers grades 4–12. Duluth's Catholic school system, Stella Maris Academy, has four campuses providing Catholic education from early childhood to high school. There are also two Protestant schools, two Montessori schools, and six other charter and private schools.

Due to its proximity to the Great Lakes, Duluth is the location for the Large Lakes Observatory. The Large Lakes Observatory operates the largest university-owned research vessel in the Great Lakes, the R/V Blue Heron. Built in 1985 for fishing on the Grand Banks, the Blue Heron was purchased by the University of Minnesota in 1997; sailed from Portland, Maine, up the St. Lawrence Seaway, to Duluth; and converted into a limnological research vessel during the winter of 1997–98. The Blue Heron is part of the University National Oceanographic Laboratory System and is available for charter by research scientists on any of the Great Lakes.

== Media ==
Local newspapers include the monthly BusinessNorth and the twice-weekly Duluth News Tribune. Free newspapers include the Transistor, The Zenith, and The Reader Weekly.

Locally based, nationally distributed magazines include Lake Superior Magazine and New Moon Magazine.

Major television affiliates serving the area include KBJR-TV and KDLH, WDIO-DT, and KQDS-TV.

Most commercial radio stations in the Duluth-Superior market are owned by Midwest Communications or Townsquare Media. Townsquare owns the oldest station in the market, WEBC, which signed on June 1, 1924. Midwest owns KQDS-FM, the market's highest-rated station.

Numerous non-commercial stations can also be heard in the market, including stations affiliated with Wisconsin Public Radio and Minnesota Public Radio.

== Infrastructure ==
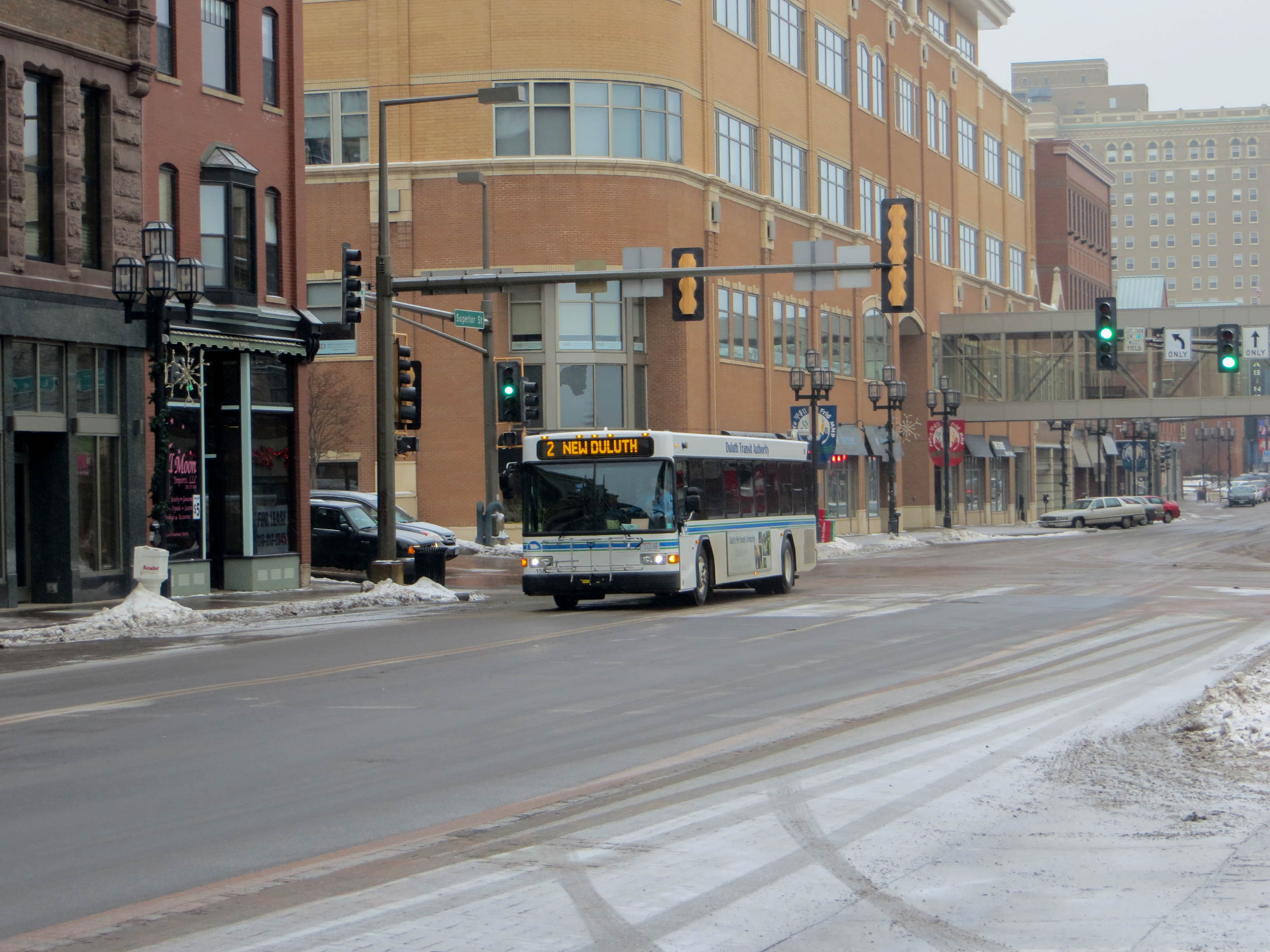
Duluth Transit Authority bus

=== Public transportation ===
The local bus system is run by the Duluth Transit Authority (DTA), which serves Duluth, Hermantown, Proctor, Rice Lake, and Superior, Wisconsin. The DTA runs a system of buses manufactured by Gillig and Proterra, including new hybrids and battery electric busses. Duluth is also served by Skyline Shuttle, with daily service to the Minneapolis-Saint Paul International Airport; Jefferson Lines, with daily service to the Twin Cities; and Indian Trails, with service to Michigan's Upper Peninsula.

=== Railways ===
Duluth was connected to Minneapolis by the North Star passenger train from 1978 to 1985. The North Shore Scenic Railroad operated seasonal excursion trains on its line to Two Harbors. The former Duluth, Missabe and Iron Range Railway, now part of the Canadian National Railway, operates taconite-hauling trains in the area. Duluth is also served by the BNSF Railway, the Canadian Pacific Railway, and the Union Pacific Railroad.

A proposal to restore service between the Twin Cities and the Twin Ports via the Northern Lights Express was first made in 2000. Detailed plans and environmental assessments have since been completed, but the project has yet to be fully funded.

=== Air transport ===
Duluth International Airport (KDLH) serves the city and surrounding region with daily flights to Minneapolis and Chicago. Nearby municipal airports are Duluth Sky Harbor on Minnesota Point and the Richard I. Bong Airport in Superior. Both the Bong Airport and Bong Bridge are named for famed World War II pilot and highest-scoring American World War II air ace Major Richard Ira "Dick" Bong, a native of nearby Poplar, Wisconsin.

=== Highways ===
The Duluth area marks the northern endpoint of Interstate Highway 35, which stretches south to Laredo, Texas. U.S. Highways that serve the area are U.S. Highway 53, which stretches from La Crosse, Wisconsin, to International Falls, and U.S. Highway 2, which stretches from Everett, Washington, to St. Ignace, in the Upper Peninsula of Michigan. The southwestern part of the city has Thompson Hill, where travelers entering Duluth on I-35 can see most of Duluth, including the Aerial Lift Bridge and the waterfront. There are two freeway connections from Duluth to Superior. U.S. 2 provides a connection into Superior via the Richard I. Bong Memorial Bridge; Interstate 535 runs concurrently with U.S. 53 over the John Blatnik Bridge.

Many state highways serve the area. Highway 23 runs diagonally across Minnesota, indirectly connecting Duluth to Sioux Falls, South Dakota. Highway 33 provides a western bypass of Duluth connecting Interstate 35, which comes up from the Twin Cities to U.S. 53, which leads to Iron Range cities and International Falls. Highway 61 provides access to Thunder Bay, Ontario, via the North Shore of Lake Superior. Highway 194 provides a spur route into the city of Duluth known as "Central Entrance" and Mesaba Avenue. Wisconsin Highway 13 reaches along Lake Superior's South Shore. Wisconsin Highway 35 runs along Wisconsin's western border for 412 miles (663 km) to its southern terminus at the Wisconsin–Illinois border (three miles or 4.8 kilometres north of East Dubuque). Highway 61 and parts of Highways 2 and 53 are segments of the Lake Superior Circle Tour route that follows Lake Superior through Minnesota, Ontario, Michigan, and Wisconsin.

==== Major highways ====
- Interstate 35
- Interstate 535
- U.S. Highway 2
- U.S. Highway 53
- Minnesota State Highway 23
- Minnesota State Highway 61 – North Shore
- Minnesota State Highway 194 – Central Entrance – Mesaba Avenue
- Minnesota State Highway 210
- Saint Louis County Road 4 – Rice Lake Road
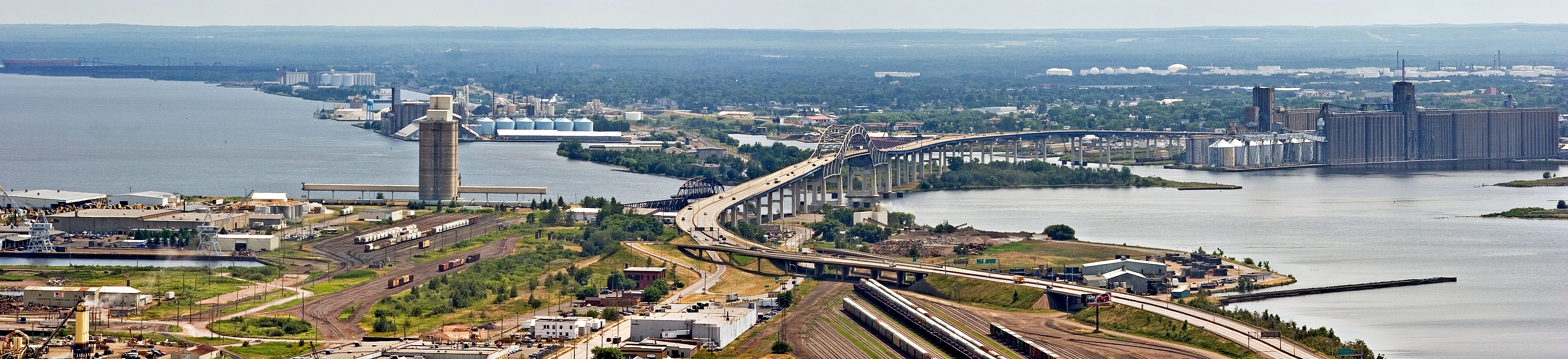
Blatnik Bridge looking east

=== Port of Duluth–Superior ===
At the western end of the Saint Lawrence Seaway, the Duluth–Superior port is North America's largest and farthest-inland freshwater port. The port handles an average of 46 million short tons (42,000,000 t) of cargo and over 1,100 visits each year from domestic and international vessels. With 49 miles (79 km) of waterfront, it is one of North America's leading bulk cargo ports and ranks among the top 20 ports in the U.S. Duluth is a major shipping port for taconite pellets, made from concentrated low-grade iron ore and destined for midwestern and eastern steel mills. The arrival schedule of the ships that pass under the bridge is available, and locals and visitors gather to watch them enter the harbor. Despite their size, large sections of the Great Lakes freeze over in winter, interrupting most shipping from January to March.

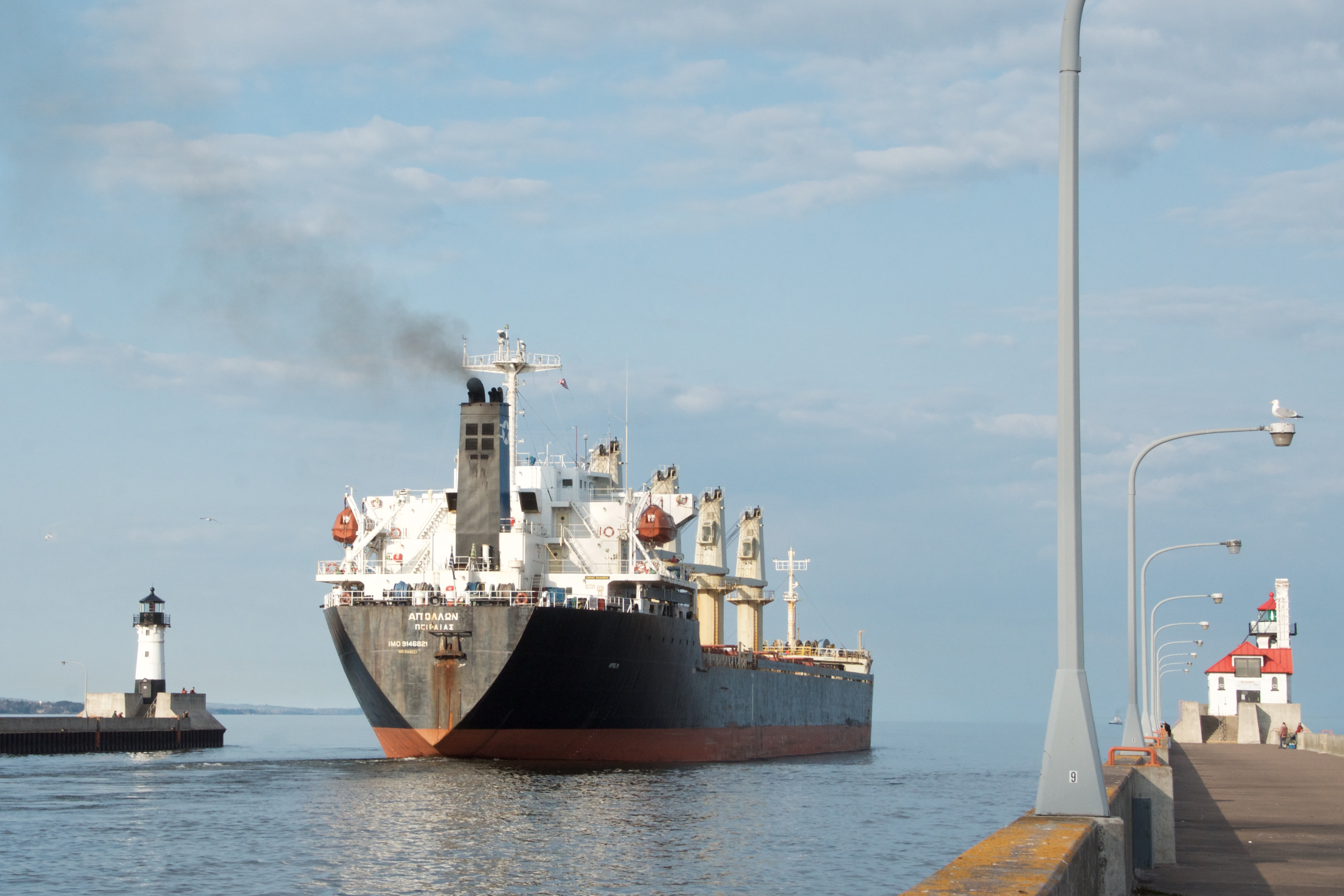
MV Apollon, registered in Greece

Two types of ships regularly enter the port: the lakers and the salties. The lakers, which comprise over 90% of the port traffic, are the larger cargo ships built specially to sail the Great Lakes, with the largest ones over 1,000 feet long. They are mostly self-unloaders, with a long boom mounted on the upper deck. Their traffic is limited to the Great Lakes because they are too large to fit through the St. Lawrence Seaway. The salties are smaller ships with a maximum size of 740 feet. They typically have sharply cutaway bows as compared to the lakers' vertical ones, as well as a series of cranes rising above their decks. They are small enough to navigate the St. Lawrence Seaway. Other than their size, they can also be identified by their color, often blue, red, or green. The lakers are generally black or rust.

=== Utilities ===
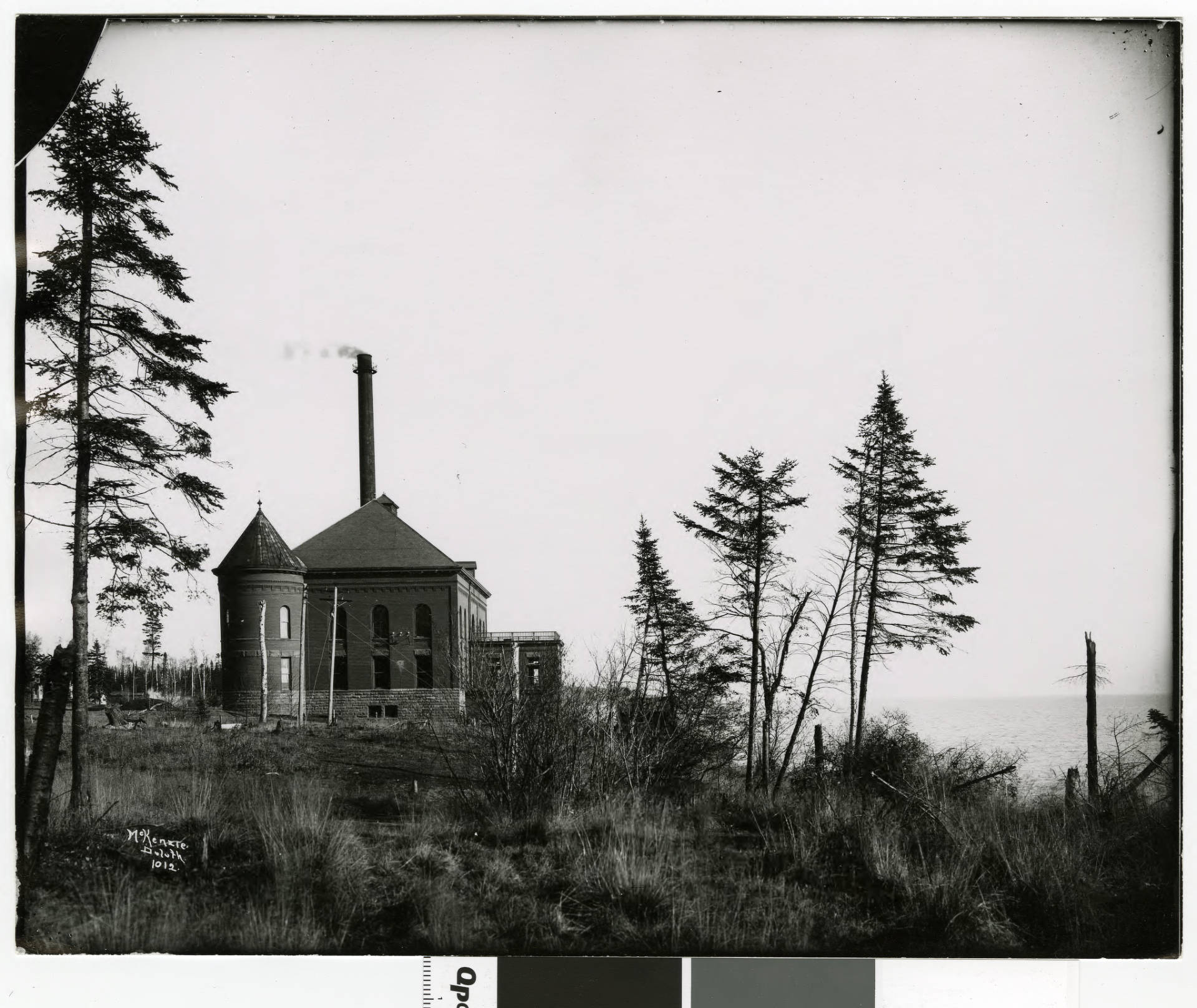
Duluth's Lakewood Pumphouse, built in 1896 and pictured in 1915, is still in use today

Duluth gets electric power from Duluth-based Minnesota Power, a subsidiary of ALLETE, Inc. Minnesota Power produces energy at generation facilities throughout northern Minnesota and a generation plant in North Dakota. The latter supplies electricity into the MP system by the Square Butte HVDC line, which ends near the town. Minnesota Power primarily uses western coal to generate electricity but also has a number of small hydroelectric facilities, the largest of which is the Thomson Dam southwest of Duluth on the Saint Louis River. Because of wind energy demand, Duluth has recently become a port for wind energy parts shipments from overseas and the Midwestern hub for shipments out to various wind energy sites.

Duluth's water supply is sourced from Lake Superior and treated at the Lakewood Water Treatment Plant. The plant's oldest structure, the Lakewood Pumphouse, was built in 1896 in Romanesque Revival style, replacing older facilities that had been unable to prevent a typhoid epidemic. It was designed by William Patton. A 42-inch original main from 1896, one of two leaving the facility with clean, treated water, is still in use today. The system supplies approximately 100,000 people in Duluth and nearby towns. Throughout its history, Duluth's sewers have overflowed when it rains, causing untreated sewage to flow into Lake Superior and the Saint Louis River. In 2001 alone, the overflow amounted to over 6.9 million US gallons (26,000,000 L; 5,700,000 imp gal).

=== Fire department ===
According to a 2013 report, the city of Duluth was protected by 132 paid, professional firefighters from the Duluth Fire Department that year. The Duluth Fire Department responded to 12,231 fire and emergency medical calls in 2015.

The Duluth Fire Department operates out of eight fire stations, under the command of an Assistant Chief, Squad 251. The department also operates a fire apparatus fleet of six engines, one tower ladder, two quints, one heavy-duty rescue, two light medical response vehicles, and numerous other special, support, and reserve units.

== Duluth innovations ==
Notable innovations established in Duluth include:

- Duluth pack, patented in 1882, a portage pack used for canoe travel.
- Pie à la Mode, invented in 1885, a slice of pie topped with a scoop of ice cream.
- Alexander Miles's electric elevator, invented in 1887 as a method of opening and closing elevator doors.
- Lark of Duluth, launched as the first airline service in the United States and first heavier-than-air airline in the world, carrying joyriders over the Duluth–Superior harbor from 1913 to 1914.
- Lake View Store, the first indoor shopping mall in the United States, opened in Duluth's Morgan Park in 1916.
- Pizza rolls, created by Duluth food industry magnate Jeno Paulucci and trademarked in 1967.
- Aerostich Roadcrafter suit, the first synthetic textile armored riding suit for motorcyclists, created by Andy Goldfine in 1982.
- Cirrus Airframe Parachute System, developed by the Klapmeier brothers and tested by Scott Anderson in 1998 as the first whole-plane parachute recovery system on a line of aircraft.

== In popular culture ==
- F. Scott Fitzgerald's The Great Gatsby (1925), a modernist novel set in the Jazz Age, has scenes in Duluth and on the shores of Lake Superior.
- You'll Like My Mother (1972) is a horror-thriller film shot in and around Duluth, principally at Glensheen Historic Estate.
- Far North (1988) is a comedy-drama film directed by Sam Shepard and starring Jessica Lange shot in and around Duluth.
- Iron Will (1994) is a Walt Disney Pictures adventure film with Duluth substituting for 1917 Winnipeg.
- The Louie Show (1996), a short-lived CBS television sitcom starring comedian Louie Anderson, is set in Duluth and features downtown Duluth buildings in its opening title sequence.
- Leatherheads (2008), a sports comedy film co-starring George Clooney and Renée Zellweger, is set in 1920s Duluth and features a fictitious pro football team partially based on the Duluth Eskimos.
- The first season of Fargo (2014), an FX black comedy-crime drama television series inspired by the 1996 film of the same name, is mainly set in and around Duluth and Bemidji.
- Girl from the North Country (2017) is a Broadway musical based on the songs of Bob Dylan (who was born in Duluth in 1941) and set in the city during the winter of 1934.

== Sister cities ==
Duluth has five sister cities:

- Isumi, Chiba Prefecture, Japan
- Petrozavodsk, Karelia, Russia
- Ranya, Kurdistan Region, Iraq
- Thunder Bay, Ontario, Canada
- Växjö, Kronoberg, Sweden

== See also ==
- Darling's Observatory
- Duluth model
- Federal Prison Camp, Duluth
- Oliver G. Traphagen House
- USS Duluth, 2 ships
