= Skyline Parkway =

Scenic byway in Minnesota

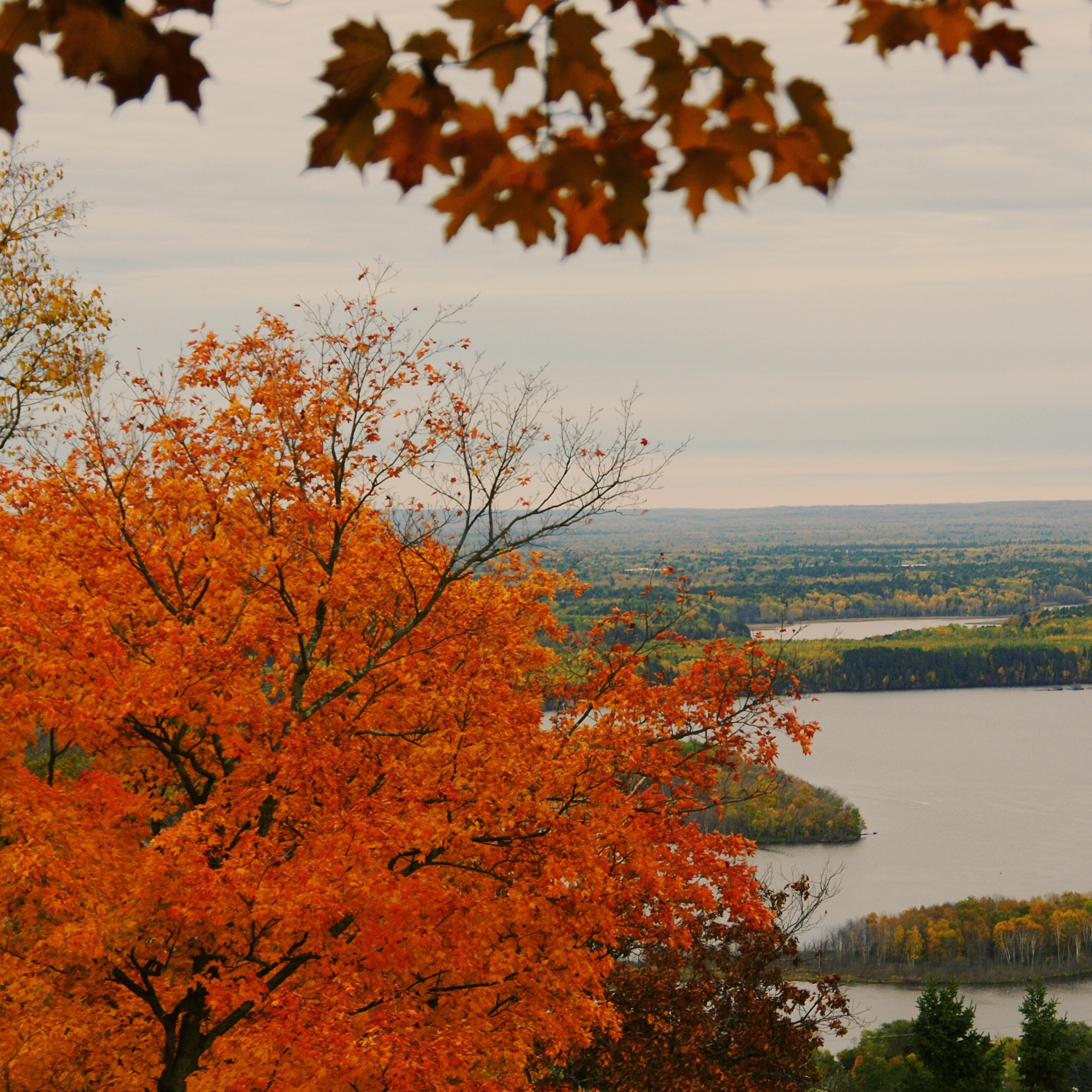
Fall colors and view of Spirit Lake from West Skyline Parkway

Skyline Parkway is a scenic byway in Duluth, Minnesota. The road stretches 28 miles (45 km) from Becks Road to Seven Bridges Road, and is split into West Skyline Parkway and East Skyline Parkway. It follows the ancient shoreline of Glacial Lake Duluth. The byway is known for its views of Duluth, Superior, Wisconsin, the Saint Louis River and Lake Superior.

== History ==
=== Pre-history ===
Skyline Parkway follows the shoreline of Glacial Lake Duluth. 18,000 years ago when the Laurentide Ice Sheet began to retreat it eventually created the shoreline and Glacial Lake Duluth. The lake was formed around 11,000 years ago. It would then drain and reveal the shoreline that Skyline Parkway follows.

=== Conception (1888–1892) ===
Skyline Parkway is considered "Duluth's First Tourist Attraction". It was conceived by William K. Rogers, the city's first park board president, in 1888. Rogers was a businessman and graduate of Harvard Law School who first arrived in Duluth in 1870. He came to Duluth to invest in the budding community. Construction began in April 1889 on Tenth Street, and by August the road was being used. The road slowly began to crawl west, but construction was difficult due to the terrain and rock. The road lacked an official name but was known locally by several names. Terrace Parkway, The Boulevard, the Boulevard Drive, Lake View Terrace, or Bay View Terrace were all used. By 1892, the Boulevard ran 5 miles (8.0 km) from Chester Bowl to Lincoln Park.

=== Rogers Boulevard ===
In 1894, the Duluth park board decided to officially name the boulevard. They voted unanimously to name it Rogers Boulevard in honor of William K. Rogers. Also in 1894, the city created two lakes that the road ran between. These are now known as Twin Ponds.

==== Expansion ====
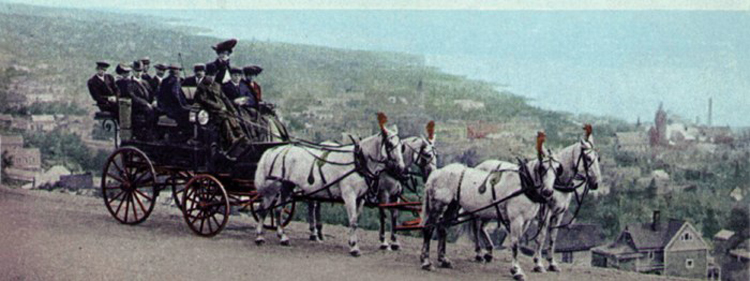
A stage coach or "Tally-ho" party in 1904 on Rogers Boulevard

In 1904, construction started to expand Rogers Boulevard past Lincoln Park. This part of the construction was expensive and difficult due to several ravines. By the end 1908, the road was extended to Oneota Cemetery. By 1913, it stretched to Thompson Hill. Rogers Boulevard was now 18 miles (29 km) in length.

=== Snively Boulevard ===
In 1899, future Duluth mayor Samuel F. Snively began work on his own scenic byway. Snively contacted many Duluthians like Chester Congdon and G.G Hartley to help finance the road. Snively Boulevard followed Amity Creek and passed Snively's farm. After difficulty maintaining the road and wooden bridges, Snively approached the park board for assistance. In 1910, the board gained control of the road, and it would eventually be added to the city parkway system. It was later renamed Seven Bridges Road.

=== Bardon's Peak Boulevard ===
In 1925, now-Mayor Snively finished "The Mayor's Boulevard Extension." This is a section near Proctor, Minnesota, that extends from Thompson Hill to Becks Road. This extension runs along an outcrop known as Bardon's Peak, named after pioneer of the area James Bardon. This peak provides views of West Duluth, Morganpark, Smithville, Riverside, and Gary-New Duluth.

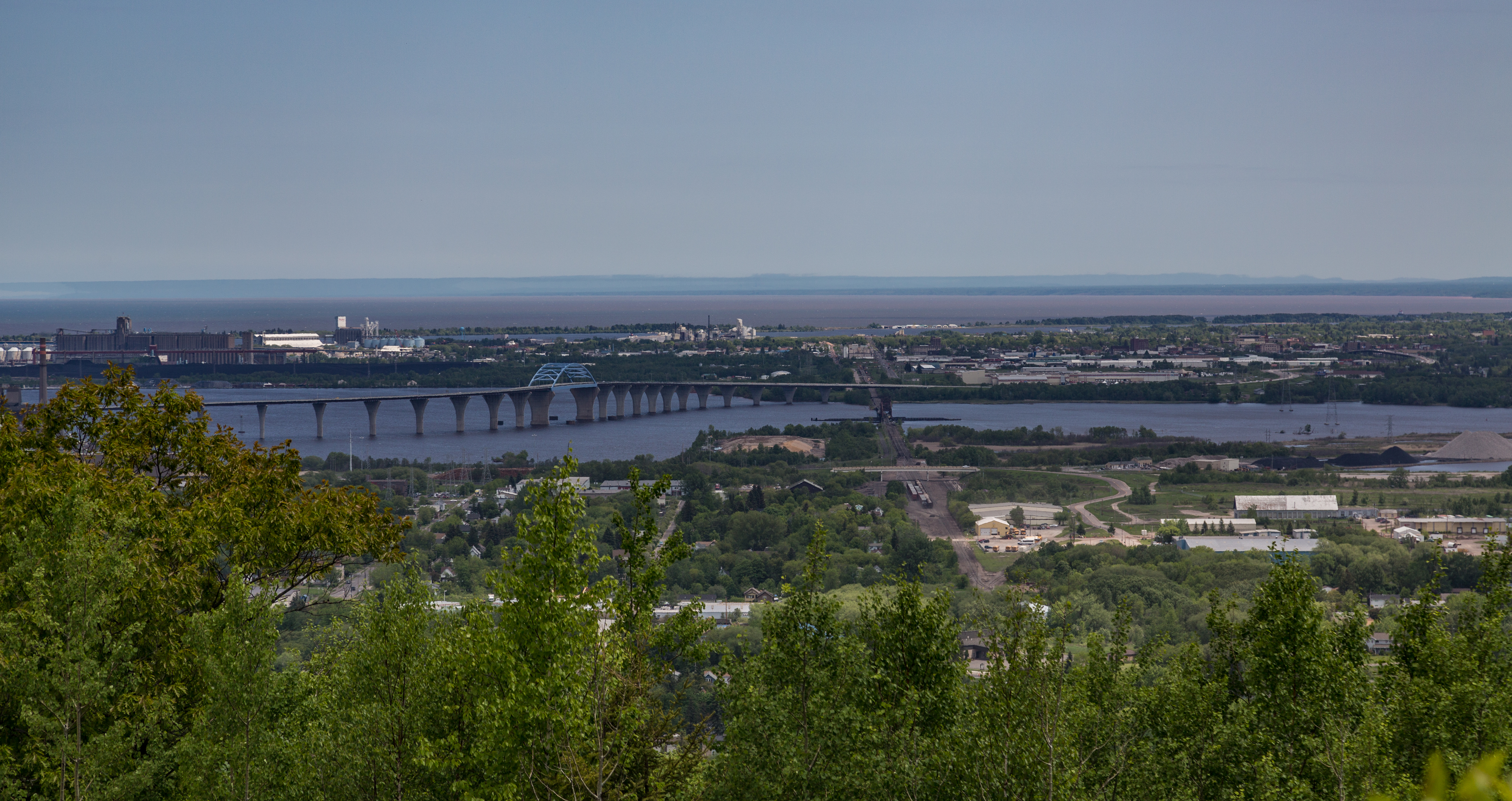
View of the St. Louis River and the Bong Bridge from Thompson Hill on West Skyline Parkway

Bardon's Peak Boulevard was built over Stewart Creek, and the Stewart Creek Bridge was constructed spanning it. This bridge was registered in the National Register for Historic Places in 1989. Also along this section is the Magney-Snively Natural Area. It was named after Snively and another Duluth mayor, Clarence Magney.

The section between Stewart Creek and Becks Road remains unpaved. The section between Magney-Snively Park and Becks Road is closed during the winter months. It remains open only for snowmobiles, bikes, and foot traffic.

=== Mission Creek Boulevard ===
In 1928, under Snively the boulevard extended to Jay Cooke State Park. This new section was known as Mission Creek Boulevard. It was largely ignored and today is closed to traffic, but remains a footpath.

=== Skyline Parkway (1929) ===
In 1929, after the completion of Mission Creek Boulevard, Snively declared the parkway finished. After a competition ran by the Duluth News Tribune, the parkway system was renamed Skyline Parkway. This system included Rogers Boulevard, Snively Boulevard, Bardon's Peak Boulevard, and Mission Creek Boulevard.

=== 2012 flooding ===
In 2012, a historic flood hit northeastern Minnesota. Portions of West Skyline Parkway were washed out trapping a neighborhood for a week. An area next to the Stewart Creek Bridge, and another area by Spirit Mountain trapped the neighborhood between them. Near the bridge, a monument for Samuel Snively was rebuilt following the flood.

== Attractions ==
- Bardon's Peak
- Magney-Snively Park
- Stewart Creek Bridge
- Spirit Mountain
- Thompson Hill
- Seven Bridges Road
- Enger Tower and Enger Park
- Twin Ponds
- First United Methodist Church (also known as Coppertop Church).
- Hawk Ridge Bird Observatory
