= Fairmount (Duluth) =

Neighborhood of Duluth, Minnesota

Coordinates: 46°44′N 92°11′W

Fairmount is a neighborhood located within the West Duluth district of Duluth, Minnesota, United States.

Grand Avenue serves as a main route in the community. Duluth's Lake Superior Zoo is located within the Fairmount neighborhood at 72nd Avenue West and Grand Avenue. Fairmount is located between Keene Creek and Kingsbury Creek. Keene Creek Dog Park is located at the eastern edge of the Fairmount neighborhood.

== Adjacent neighborhoods ==
(Directions following those of Duluth's general street grid system, not actual geographical coordinates)

- Cody (north)
- Norton Park (south, west)
- Irving (east)

== External links and references ==
- City of Duluth website
- City map of neighborhoods (PDF)
- Duluth's Lake Superior Zoo website
