= Oneota (Duluth) =

Neighborhood of Duluth, Minnesota

Coordinates: 46°44′47″N 92°09′58″W

Oneota is a neighborhood located within the West Duluth district of Duluth, Minnesota, United States. The neighborhood was named for the prehistoric Oneota Native American culture.

Interstate Highway 35, 40th Avenue West, West Michigan Street, and Oneota Street are four of the main routes in the community.

Part of the neighborhood is located along Saint Louis Bay. The entrance to the Bong Bridge (U.S. 2) is located within the Oneota neighborhood at 46th Avenue West.

Local business establishments include Perkins–West.

== Adjacent neighborhoods ==
(Directions following those of Duluth's general street grid system, not actual geographical coordinates)

- Spirit Valley (west)
- Denfeld (north, west)
- Irving (south, west)
- Lincoln Park (east)

== External links and references ==
- City of Duluth website
- City map of neighborhoods (PDF)
