= Stewart Creek Bridge =

Bridge in Duluth, Minnesota

- Bridge No. L-6007
- U.S. National Register of Historic Places
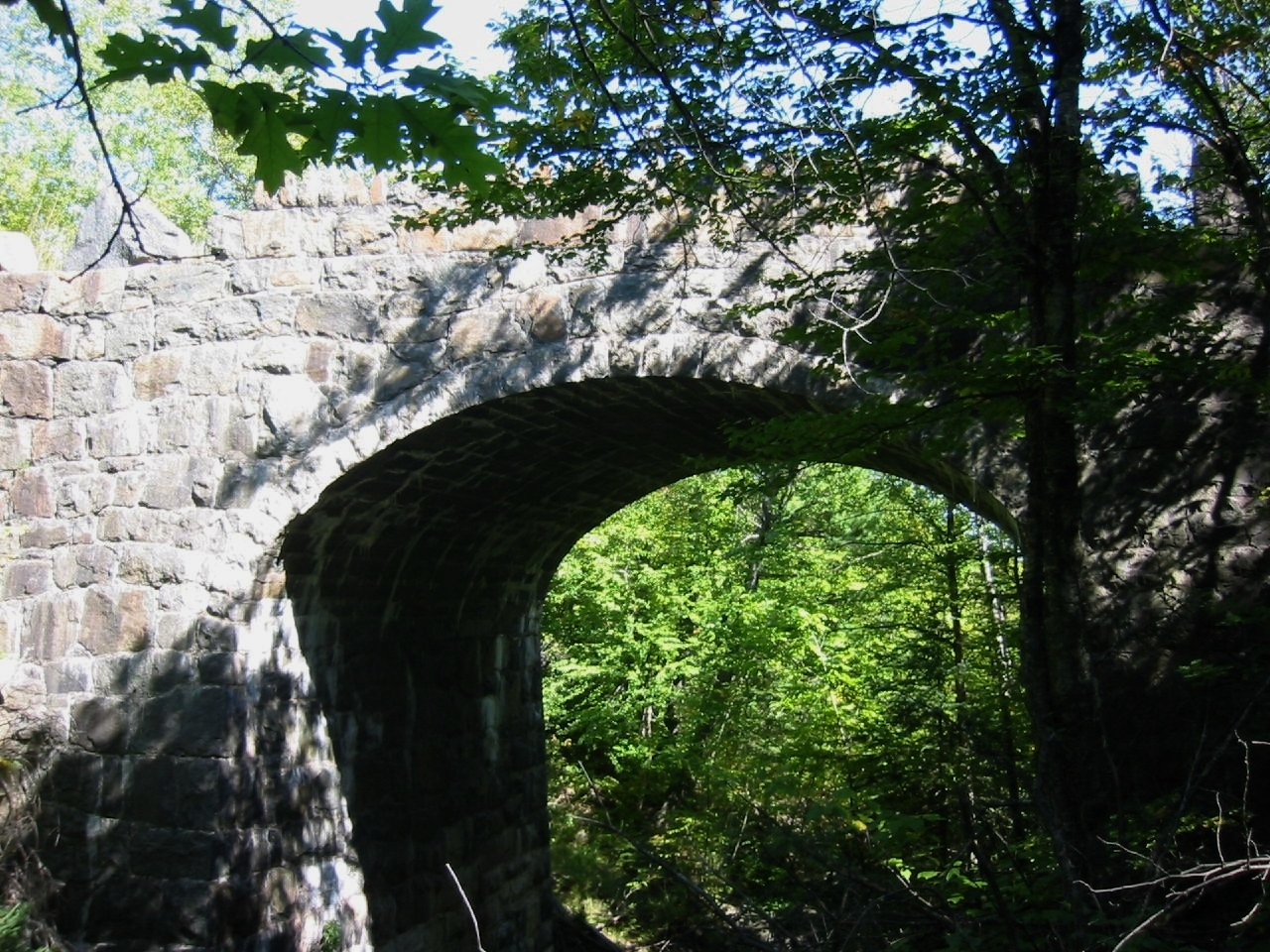
- The Stewart Creek Bridge viewed from the west

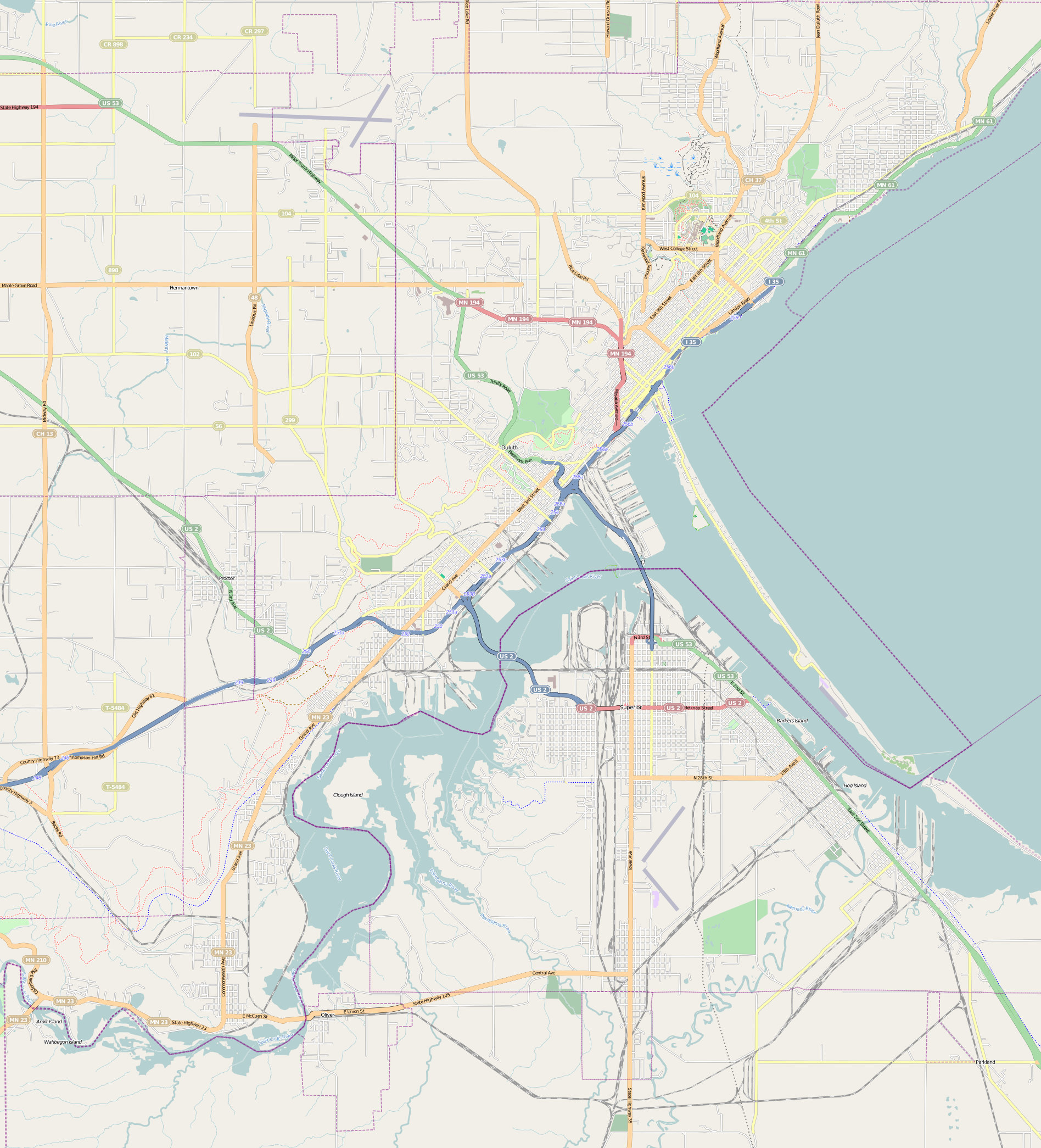
- Location within Duluth Location within Minnesota Location within the United States
- Location: Skyline Parkway over Stewart Creek, Duluth, Minnesota
- Coordinates: 46°42′13″N 92°13′41″W
- Area: Less than one acre
- Built: c. 1925
- Architectural style: Picturesque
- MPS: Minnesota Masonry-Arch Highway Bridges MPS
- NRHP reference No.: 89001826
- Added to NRHP: November 6, 1989

The Stewart Creek Bridge or Bridge L6007 is a stone arch bridge in the Smithville neighborhood of Duluth, Minnesota, United States. It was built around 1925 as part of the scenic Skyline Parkway overlooking the city. The Stewart Creek Bridge was listed on the National Register of Historic Places in 1989 under the name Bridge No. L-6007 for its state-level significance in the theme of engineering. It was nominated for being the most picturesque stone arch road bridge in design and setting in Minnesota.

The Stewart Creek Bridge is built of locally quarried, dark green gabbro, which is abundant in the Duluth area. The single-span arch over a deep ravine is built on rubble abutments, springing about seven feet (2.1 m) above grade and rising 10 feet (3 m) over a span of 30 feet (9 m). The rubble spandrel walls continue back in straight lines to form the retaining walls for the approaches. The bridge railings are topped with double sawtooth-shaped rows of gabbro. Overall, the bridge is about 29 feet (8.8 m) wide.

The bridge embodies mid-19th-century Picturesque traditions in its abrupt appearance on a secluded bend, high abutments emphasizing its height, arcing curve, pointed boulders lining the approach, and spiky railings. The City of Duluth rehabilitated the bridge from 2012 to 2013.

== See also ==
- List of bridges on the National Register of Historic Places in Minnesota
- National Register of Historic Places listings in St. Louis County, Minnesota
