= Bayview Heights =

Bayview Heights may refer to:

- Bayview Heights, Queensland, Australia
- Bayview Heights (Duluth), Minnesota, United States
- Bayview Heights, Saskatchewan, Canada
