= Lake Superior Zoo =

Zoo in Duluth, Minnesota, U.S.

- Interactive map of Lake Superior Zoo
- 46°43′31″N 92°11′28″W
- Date opened: 1923
- Location: Duluth, Minnesota, United States
- Land area: 19 acres (7.7 ha)
- No. of animals: 300+
- No. of species: 140+
- Memberships: AZA
- Major exhibits: Bear Country; Australia and Oceania; Primate Conservation Center and Nocturnal Building
- Owner: City of Duluth (operated by the Lake Superior Zoological Society)
- Director: Noah Hobbs
- Website: lszoo.org

The Lake Superior Zoo, formerly known as the Duluth Zoo, is an Association of Zoos and Aquariums (AZA)–accredited zoo in Duluth, Minnesota, United States. Covering roughly 19 acres (7.7 ha) in the Fairmount neighborhood of West Duluth, at the base of Spirit Mountain, it is the only zoo in northeastern Minnesota and northwestern Wisconsin. The zoo houses more than 400 animals representing over 140 species.

The zoo's grounds and buildings are owned by the City of Duluth and operated by the non-profit Lake Superior Zoological Society. Kingsbury Creek, a Minnesota Department of Natural Resources–designated trout stream, runs through the grounds, which include more than a mile of paved walking trails.

== History ==
=== Founding and early years (1923–1950s) ===
The zoo was founded in 1923 by Bert Onsgard, a West Duluth businessman, who built a pen in Fairmount Park for his rescued white-tailed deer, "Billy," after receiving permission from Mayor Samuel Frisby Snively. Onsgard's idea drew broad community support: the Pittsburgh Steel Company donated a rail car of fencing, citizens contributed exotic pets, and local schoolchildren raised money to purchase the zoo's first pair of lion cubs. By 1928 the collection had grown to more than 200 animals, and Onsgard at times paid for their feed out of his own pocket.

During the Great Depression, the Works Progress Administration (WPA) invested heavily in the grounds, building pedestrian bridges over Kingsbury Creek and a number of animal enclosures, including a bear den completed in 1940; several of these structures remain in use. An elephant house opened in 1937. The Arrowhead Zoological Society ran the facility for many years until 1959, when it became city-owned.

=== Growth and AZA accreditation (1960s–2000s) ===
During the 1960s and 1970s the zoo operated as a polar bear breeding facility. In the 1980s, an AZA-led movement toward modern animal welfare, natural habitats, and enrichment prompted the zoo to expand its focus on environmental education and conservation; it earned its first AZA accreditation in 1985. The facility was renamed the Lake Superior Zoo in the mid-1980s to reflect its regional role.

In 1987 the state legislature, the City of Duluth, and local citizens invested $7 million—$4 million from the state and $3 million from the city—to fund major renovations, producing new naturalistic habitats for large cats and bears and an Australian exhibit building. Further expansion in the 1990s added the Willard Munger Animal Care Center, named for the late state representative Willard Munger, to provide modern veterinary care, and the primate exhibit was renovated in 1998. The original 1937 elephant house was converted into the Polar Shores exhibit in 1990 to house polar bears and harbor seals.

The zoo lost its AZA accreditation in 2006 but regained it in 2011, after the City of Duluth transferred daily operations to the non-profit Lake Superior Zoological Society.

=== 2012 flood and rebuilding ===
On June 20, 2012, roughly nine inches of rain fell on the Duluth area, causing Kingsbury Creek to overflow its banks and inundate portions of the zoo. Fourteen animals died, most of them barnyard residents, among them sheep, goats, a donkey, a raven, a turkey vulture, and a snowy owl. A polar bear named Berlin and two harbor seals escaped their enclosures but were safely recovered; one of the seals was famously photographed swimming along Grand Avenue. Because of extensive damage to the Polar Shores habitat, the seals and polar bear were relocated to the Como Park Zoo and Conservatory in St. Paul, while the zoo's North American river otters were temporarily moved to the Great Lakes Aquarium in Duluth. The zoo closed for about three weeks and reopened on July 13, 2012, though visitation and revenue declined afterward.

Following the flood, the zoo's WPA-era bluestone open-air pavilion was renovated into an indoor classroom and event venue. A new master plan—substantially smaller than a $40 million plan approved in 2008—was completed in early 2016, leading to a new silver fox exhibit, new raptor enclosures, a renovated two-story primate exhibit, and a "Zoomobile" van for educational outreach.

== Exhibits and attractions ==
The zoo organizes its collection into geographic and thematic zones.

Bear Country was rebuilt and expanded after the 2012 flood with the help of a Minnesota state bonding bill, and features a year-round pool for the zoo's Alaska Peninsula brown bears, Tundra and Banks.

Zoo Central and the Griggs Learning Center serve as the indoor core of the zoo and an education hub, housing reptiles, amphibians, and small mammals such as sand cats, snapping turtle, axolotl, a Gila monster, and several parrot species.

Australia and Oceania is a specialized building featuring species native to the South Pacific, including Bennett's wallabies, kangaroos, capybara, and endangered turtles.

The Primate Conservation Center and Nocturnal Building is dedicated to primate enrichment and nocturnal species. The primate area houses animals such as the cotton-top tamarin and Angolan colobus, while the nocturnal section operates on a reversed light cycle so visitors can observe active night-dwelling animals including the Pallas's cat, pygmy slow loris, Egyptian fruit bats, two-toed sloths and the large-spotted genet.

The zoo's large carnivores include an Amur tiger, an African lion, a snow leopard, and a cougar. In late 2025, Canada lynx brothers Floki and Bjorn arrived from the Pittsburgh Zoo & PPG Aquarium as part of an AZA Species Survival Plan and went on view in a renovated habitat.

== Notable former animals and exhibits ==
- Bessie the elephant was one of the zoo's first star attractions, arriving in 1937 at age 12 when the elephant house opened. Before permanent perimeter fencing was installed, she occasionally wandered into surrounding West Duluth neighborhoods; in one account a zookeeper, summoned in his pajamas after Bessie appeared on a resident's porch, led her home by the trunk. She remained at the zoo until her death in 1974 at age 49.
- Valerie, a Himalayan black bear, served as a mascot for a World War II bomber unit before being donated to the zoo in 1946.
- Mr. Magoo, an Indian mongoose, was given to the zoo in 1962 after arriving on a merchant ship from Madras (now Chennai). Because a 1909 federal law barred mongooses from the United States, officials ordered the animal destroyed, prompting a widely publicized public campaign to save him. United States Secretary of the Interior Stewart Udall granted Mr. Magoo a temporary reprieve and then permanent asylum in 1963; President John F. Kennedy was reported to have praised the effort during a visit to Duluth that September. Mr. Magoo, who inspired the 1965 book The Duluth Mongoose by Jack Denton Scott, died on January 8, 1968, and was later preserved and placed on display at the zoo.
- Bubba the polar bear came to the zoo as a cub in 1990 and was known for his playful personality. He died of liver disease on August 8, 2007, at age 17.
- Polar Shores, originally the 1937 elephant house, was converted in 1990 to house polar bears and harbor seals and was permanently retired after the 2012 flood.

== Conservation and accreditation ==
The Lake Superior Zoo is one of three facilities in Minnesota accredited by the Association of Zoos and Aquariums, alongside the Minnesota Zoo and the Como Park Zoo and Conservatory. Accreditation requires standards for animal welfare, veterinary medicine, financial stability, and participation in conservation and research. The zoo takes part in several AZA Species Survival Plans, cooperative breeding programs that maintain genetically healthy populations of threatened species across accredited institutions.

== Governance and operations ==
While the grounds and buildings are owned by the City of Duluth, daily operations, animal care, and staffing are managed by the non-profit Lake Superior Zoological Society under a community board of directors. Operating costs and habitat projects are funded through a mix of municipal tourism-tax support, state bonding, grants, and private donations; in 2020 the city reported providing the zoo about $510,000 in tourism-tax support, with an additional $150,000 from the state.

The zoo's top position has changed hands frequently, particularly in the years following the 2012 flood and the COVID-19 pandemic. Erik Simonson, a Duluth assistant fire chief and state senator, was hired as CEO and executive director in September 2017 and oversaw the renewal of the zoo's AZA accreditation before leaving in March 2020 for Lake Superior College as the pandemic forced layoffs. He was succeeded in August 2020 by Haley Cope—later known as Haley Hedstrom—who had joined the zoo as marketing director in 2018 and led a rebranding effort; during her tenure the Bear Country exhibit opened and the zoo marked its centennial, before she left in 2025 to lead Visit Duluth. Noah Hobbs, a former Duluth city councilor, served as interim director from August 2025 and was named executive director in March 2026; his early tenure emphasized broadening the zoo's appeal, including the launch of an on-site venue known as the Porcupine Pub.

=== Notable leaders ===
Figures who have led the zoo or the Lake Superior Zoological Society include:

- Bert Onsgard, the West Duluth businessman who founded the zoo in 1923 and said he donated 13 years of his time to establish it.
- Lloyd Hackl, the zoo's director in the early 1960s, who took in and named Mr. Magoo and led the public campaign to keep the mongoose.
- Basil Norton, director during Mr. Magoo's final years in the late 1960s.
- Sam Maida, executive director of the Lake Superior Zoological Society, and Mike Janis, zoo director, both serving around 2002.
- Erik Simonson, CEO and executive director from 2017 to 2020.
- Haley Hedstrom (formerly Haley Cope), CEO and executive director from 2020 to 2025.
- Noah Hobbs, executive director since 2026 (interim from 2025).

== Events ==
The zoo hosts recurring seasonal events aimed at education and fundraising, including:

- Boo at the Zoo, a multi-weekend October trick-or-treating event;
- Tundra's Summer Cooldown, a midsummer ice-cream tasting named for the zoo's resident brown bear;
- Ice Luminary Walk, a winter trail event;
- Clean Yer Creek, an annual spring cleanup of Kingsbury Creek and the surrounding neighborhood; and
- Gala on the Grass, an outdoor fundraising dinner supporting the Lake Superior Zoological Society.
