= Denfeld (Duluth) =

Neighborhood in Duluth, Minnesota, US

Coordinates: 46.7319°N 92.1811°W

The Denfeld neighborhood is located within the West Duluth district of Duluth, Minnesota, United States. It consists mostly of closely spaced single-family residential homes, although a fair number of such houses have an area within the domicile registered as a rental unit. There are also a number of stores and businesses in the neighborhood concentrated along Grand Avenue.

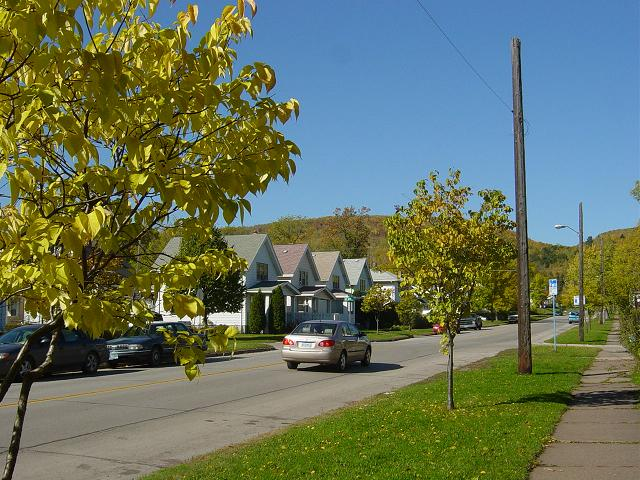
40th Avenue West, one of the neighborhood's main streets, leading to Hermantown and the Miller Hill area of Duluth.

The Denfeld neighborhood, according to the city's map, is bounded by West 8th Street until Central Avenue; by Central Avenue until its intersection with Grand Avenue; Grand Avenue, until it crosses 46th Avenue West; and a divide near the Interstate 35 freeway until the railroad tracks near Carlton Street, the classic dividing-point between West Duluth and rival neighborhood Lincoln Park.

Duluth Denfeld High School serves most of West Duluth; six neighborhoods farther to the west; and both Lincoln Park and Piedmont Heights to the east; and is an architectural icon of the neighborhood.

The first two victims of the 2024 Duluth, Minnesota shootings, a familicide with four fatalities excluding the suspect's death, were found dead in a Denfeld house.

== Adjacent neighborhoods ==
- Cody (north, west)
- Lincoln Park (east)
- Oneota (south)
- Spirit Valley (south, west)

== See also ==
- 40th Avenue West – County Road 91
