= Berghult =

Berghult is a Swedish surname that may refer to the following notable people:

- Carl Rudolf Berghult (1905–2000) was the mayor of Duluth, Minnesota, U.S.
- Joel Berghult (born 1988), Swedish singer, songwriter, producer, YouTuber and comedian
- Patricia Berghult (born 1994), Swedish professional boxer
