= Woodland (Duluth) =

Neighborhood in Duluth, Minnesota, United States

Coordinates: 46°50′46″N 92°04′57″W

Woodland is a neighborhood in Duluth, Minnesota, United States. Woodland Avenue serves as a main route in the community. The neighborhood is located between Fairmont Street and Martin Road. Other routes include Calvary Road.

== Notes ==
A small, healthy business district is located in the neighborhood. Businesses include a grocery store, a dental office, an automotive service shop, and several other local businesses.

Tischer Creek is located at the western edge of the neighborhood. Amity Creek flows through the neighborhood near its eastern edge.

Hartley Park is partially located within the neighborhood.

== Adjacent Neighborhoods ==
(Directions following those of Duluth's general street grid system, not actual geographical coordinates)

- Morley Heights / Parkview (east)
- Hunter's Park (south)
- Kenwood and City of Rice Lake (west)
- City of Rice Lake (north)
