= Norton Park (Duluth) =

Neighborhood of Duluth, Minnesota

Coordinates: 46.7319°N 92.1811°W

Norton Park is a neighborhood in Duluth, Minnesota, United States.

Grand Avenue serves as a main route in the community. The neighborhood is located between 75th Avenue West and 85th Avenue West. Norton Park is situated between Kingsbury Creek and Knowlton Creek. Indian Point Park along the Saint Louis River is located within the Norton Park neighborhood.

== Notes ==
- The Willard Munger Bicycle Trail (63-miles in length) currently begins in the Norton Park neighborhood at 75th Avenue West, near Grand Avenue. There are plans to have the Munger Trail extended to Duluth's Canal Park and connect with the lake walk. The project was expected to begin in 2011. The Western Waterfront Trail also begins at 75th Avenue West.
- This area also contains one of the last community parks maintained by neighborhood residents in the city. This is due in part by the dedication of people such as Charles J. Oliver, a lifelong resident and Denfeld graduate.
- The Norton Park Community Center building was built in 1965 and is made of 18–20 gauge steel from the Duluth Steel Building Company. The original steel part of the building sits on a 5-inch monolithic concrete slab that is 50 feet by 33 feet. The building is 15 feet tall. A small concrete block addition was added later.
- The location of the community park at 81st Avenue West and Coleman Street was once the site of the Norton Park School during the 1920s and 1930s.
- Norton Park has two churches. The Norton Park Methodist Church at 79th Avenue West and the First Love Church at 78th Avenue West. The First Love Church was formerly the Holy Cross Catholic Church built in 1923. It was moved in 1940 from 75th Avenue West and Grand Avenue to its present location.

== Adjacent neighborhoods ==
(Directions following those of Duluth's general street grid system, not actual geographical coordinates)

- Fairmount (north, east)
- Irving (east)
- Riverside (south, west)
- Bayview Heights (north)
