= East End / Endion (Duluth) =

Neighborhood of Duluth, Minnesota

Coordinates: 46°48′24″N 92°4′20″W

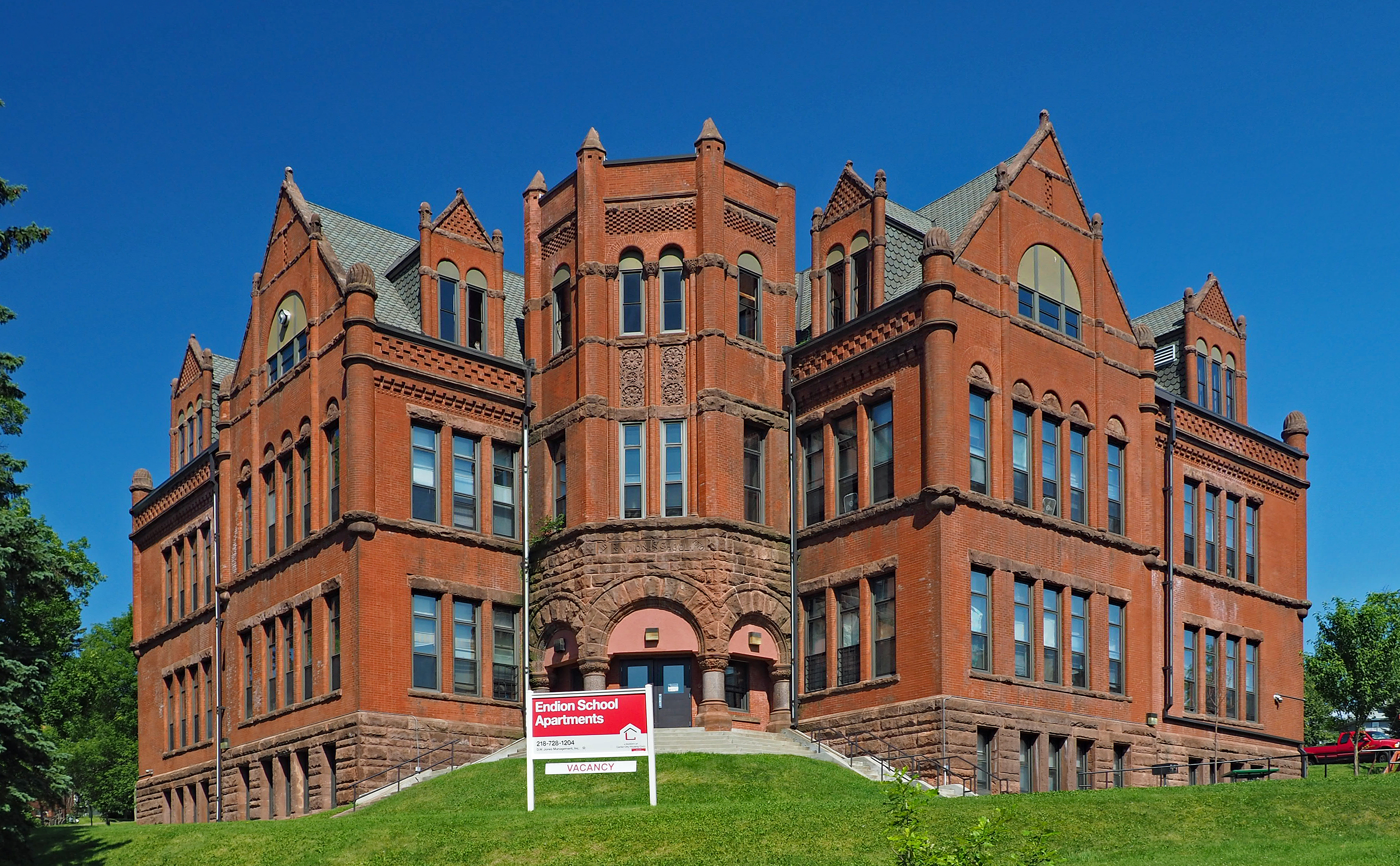
The Endion School building is a historic building in the neighborhood.

East End / Endion is a neighborhood in Duluth, Minnesota, United States.

21st Avenue East, East 2nd Street, and East 3rd Street serve as three of the main routes in the community.

== Etymology ==
Endion's name comes from the Ojibwe word endaayaan, meaning "where I live."

== Notes ==
Endion is one of the neighborhoods which surround the local higher-education institutions of the University of Minnesota Duluth and the College of St. Scholastica. It is an area filled with large homes built during the boom years of the early 1900s. Many homes are owner-occupied with some used as student rentals.

== Adjacent neighborhoods ==
(Directions following those of Duluth's general street grid system, not actual geographical coordinates)

- Congdon Park (east)
- Chester Park / UMD (north)
- East Hillside (west)

== External links and references ==
- City of Duluth website
- City map of neighborhoods (PDF)
- Out of town landlord website (Hawaii based – owns 30 boarding houses in the East End–Endion neighborhood of Duluth)
