= Spirit Valley (Duluth) =

Neighborhood of Duluth, Minnesota

Coordinates: 46°45′N 92°10′W

Spirit Valley is a neighborhood and business district located within the West Duluth district of Duluth, Minnesota, United States.

Many stores and businesses in the neighborhood are concentrated along Grand Avenue, Central Avenue, and I-35. The Spirit Valley neighborhood follows Grand Avenue between 46th Avenue West and 59th Avenue West, and includes the entire area between Grand Avenue and Mike Colalillo Drive. The core area is defined as "48th Ave. W., 8th St., Cody St., Keene Creek, and the St. Louis River."

The Spirit Valley business district is easily accessible by motor vehicle from Interstate Highway 35 at Central Avenue.

== Spirit Valley Days ==
The Spirit Valley Days festival takes place every August.

Events include a craft and vendors show, Classic car show, Waterfront Trail Run/Walk, Miss West Duluth Pageant, live music, rides, and Spirit Valley Days Parade.

== Adjacent neighborhoods ==
(Directions following those of Duluth's general street grid system, not actual geographical coordinates)

- Cody (north, west)
- Denfeld (north, east)
- Oneota (east)
- Irving (south)
