= Samuel F. Snively =

American mayor (1859–1952)

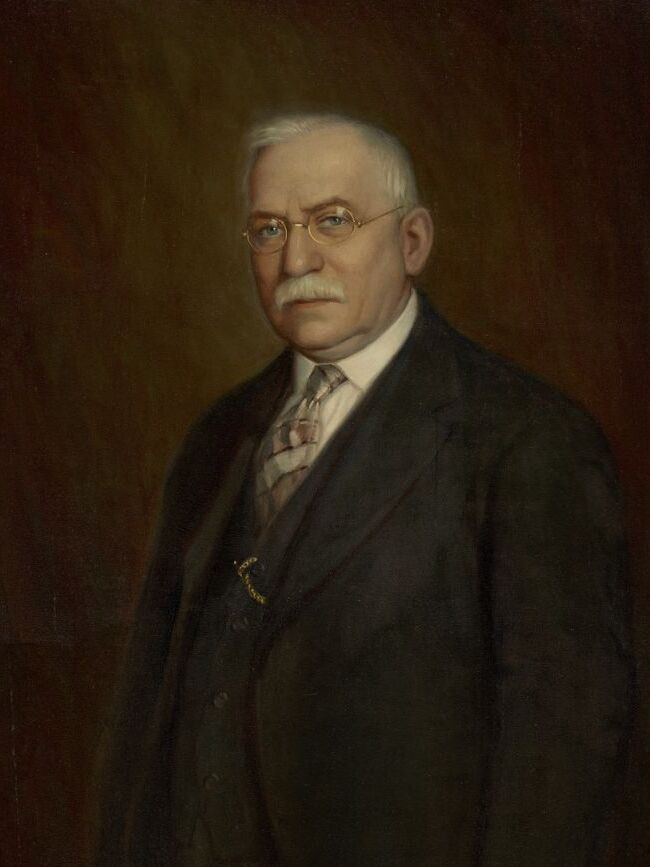
- Snively c. 1930

26th Mayor of Duluth
- In office 1921–1937
- Preceded by: Trevanion W. Hugo
- Succeeded by: Carl Rudolf Berghult

Personal details
- Born: November 24, 1859 Greencastle, Pennsylvania, U.S.
- Died: November 7, 1952 (aged 92)

Samuel Frisby Snively (November 24, 1859 – November 7, 1952) was an American politician who served as the 25th mayor of Duluth, Minnesota, from 1921–1937. His legacy as mayor is largely remembered for the effort he put into the creation of numerous parks and boulevards throughout the city, particularly Seven Bridges Road and Skyline Parkway. He remains the longest running mayor in Duluth's history.

== Early life and education ==
Snively was born on a farm near Greencastle, Pennsylvania, in the Cumberland Valley in 1859. He attended Dickinson College from 1878 to 1882, graduating with a degree in Bachelor of Arts, and also obtained a degree in Master of Arts in 1885 from the University of Philadelphia. During the 1882–83 school year, he taught in an academy in Path Valley, Pennsylvania. In the fall of 1883, he entered the law office of Benjamin Harris Brewster in Philadelphia. At the time, Brewster was the United States Attorney General in the cabinet of Chester A. Arthur. After taking a two-year course of law at University of Philadelphia, Snively passed the Philadelphia Bar exam, as well as the Bar of his home county of Franklin.

== Career ==
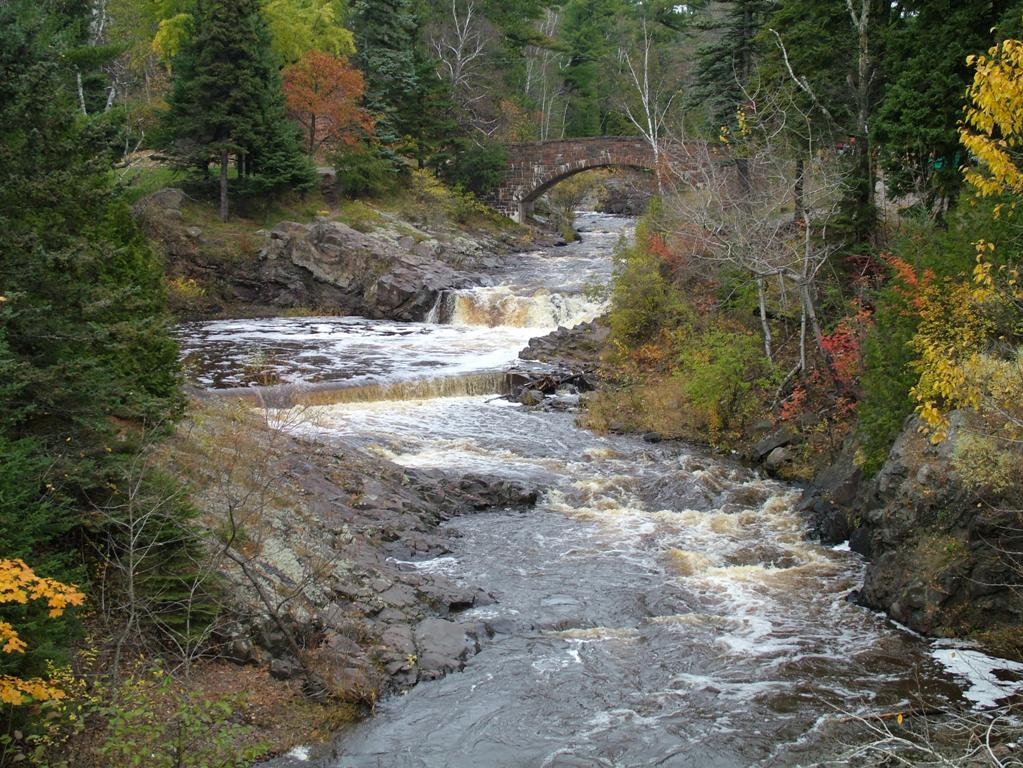
One of the many bridges throughout Amity-Lester Park, which both Seven Bridges Road and Skyline Parkway lead into and are all Duluth attractions that Snively helped develop during his career

In the spring of 1886, he moved to Duluth, Minnesota. Snively practiced law in partnership with Chas P. Craig for roughly six years under the name Snively and Craig. However they became separated in the financial massacre of 1893. Soon after, he began showing interest in farm land development. In 1900, together with J. L. Washburn and John G. Williams, they purchased over 200,000 acres (800 km^{2}) of land from the Northern Pacific Railway Company in Carlton and St. Louis county. The three were involved with the sale and development of the land for several years.

Snively owned a large 400 acre (1.6 km^{2}) farm above the Duluth suburbs of Lester Park and Lakeside. He often took leisurely hikes through the valley, exploring the woods. During these strolls, Snively began to envision a park drive that would rival any other in Duluth. After donating 60 acres (240,000 m^{2}) of his own property, Snively set to work contacting all the other landowners in the area, successfully garnering donations of the necessary rights-of-way for his road, as well as some of the necessary funds to build it.

A crew of workers was hired and construction on Snively's road began in the late fall of 1899 and continued into the following summer. During the road's construction phase, Snively was also building a house to serve as a centerpiece to his hilltop farm. By the Spring of 1900 the road reached about a mile up from its starting point just north of Lester Park. Snively built the road in a way that it crossed the Amity creek in nearly a dozen places, creating the need for the construction of many rustic wooden bridges. Upon its completion, Snively presented his new road to the city of Duluth as a designated parkway, and turned his attention to his farm and elsewhere.

Despite its popularity as a scenic parkway, the city of Duluth neglected to maintain Snively's road, and within a decade all the wooden bridges had fallen to ruin, making the road impassable to vehicle traffic. In 1910, the road was handed over to the Duluth's park commission, and a new plan for its rejuvenation was developed. The park board hired an architectural landscaping firm to design a new series of bridges for the road. During 1911, the roadway was regraded and graveled. News of the board's intentions delighted Snively. He even involved himself in the planning and building of the new bridges. Over the next year, nine stone-arch bridges were built simultaneously. When Snively's road reopened on July 6, 1912, it was renamed Amity Parkway, and became a popular destination for tourists and locals alike. Years later, when a route change threw two of the bridges into disuse, it became known as Seven Bridges Road.

For more than ninety years, seven of the original nine bridges remained structurally sound. However, most had become damaged from the decades of weather, vandalism, and car accidents. Realizing the historic value of the structures and using state and federal funds, the city of Duluth began restoring the bridges in 1996, completing the last one in 2008.

=== Duluth mayor ===
In the winter of 1921, Snively became a candidate for mayor of Duluth, was elected, and kept the position for a total of sixteen years—a record for Duluth mayors. Snively was sixty-one years old when he was elected to the office, and his first proclamation as mayor was his promise to make Duluth the most beautiful city in the Northwest, if not the country. The completion and promotion of Skyline Parkway, the city's hilltop boulevard, became Snively's personal project throughout his four terms in office. The idea for the city-wide boulevard is credited to William King Rogers of Ohio, who also oversaw construction of its initial segment from 1889 to 1891. After that, work on the boulevard fell off, and was piecemeal at best until Snively came into office. During his administration, the boulevard's expansion served as both a way to beautify the city and provide jobs during tough economic times in the 1930s.

The Magney–Snively Natural Area, located in the heart of the old growth forest in south Duluth, was named after him and fellow Duluth mayor Clarence Magney. It consists of nearly 10 miles of hiking, birdwatching, crosscountry skiing, and horseback trails for public use year-round.

== See also ==
- List of mayors of Duluth, Minnesota
