= Lincoln Park (Duluth) =

Neighborhood of Duluth, Minnesota

Coordinates: 46.7673°N 92.1376°W

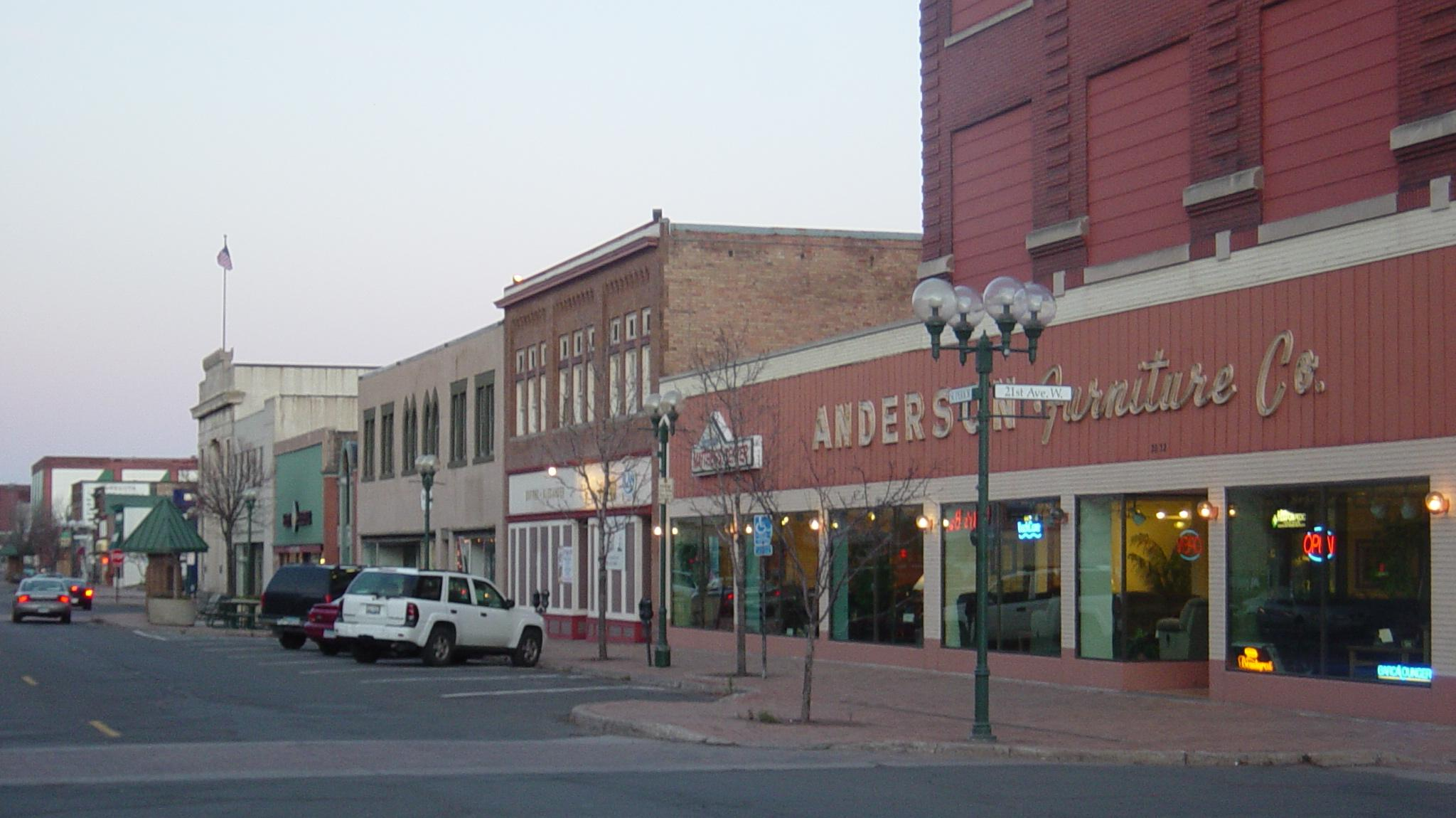
The Lincoln Park neighborhood's business district along West Superior Street

Lincoln Park is a neighborhood in Duluth, Minnesota, United States. Located between Garfield Avenue and Carlton Street (34th Avenue West), it stretches up the hillside to Skyline Parkway. The neighborhood is named after the municipal park within its boundaries.

Two creeks, Miller Creek and Coffee Creek, flow through the neighborhood. Geographical features include Rice's Point, a peninsula bordered by the Duluth Harbor Basin to the east and the Saint Louis Bay to the west. Garfield Avenue runs through Rice's Point, which is a large industrial area due to its proximity to shipping channels and railroads.

== History ==
Originally known as the "West End", the neighborhood was officially renamed "Lincoln Park" in 1996 to better represent the community and highlight the prominent park within its area. The neighborhood's development is closely tied to Duluth's growth as a port city.

== Demographics ==
As of the 2000 census, Lincoln Park had a population of 6,504, representing an 8.9% decline from the 1990 census. This represented the largest decrease in population of any of Duluth's neighborhoods. Lincoln Park has a total area of 1,954 acres (7.91 km^{2}), or 5% of the city's total area. A portion of that land is devoted to industrial and commercial uses.

The neighborhood has two public schools: Laura MacArthur Elementary School and Lincoln Park Middle School.

== Economy and transportation ==
Lincoln Park's economy is a blend of industrial, commercial, and service-oriented businesses. The main commercial business district runs along Michigan Street, Superior Street, and First Street, stretching from 17th to 22nd Avenues West. The area is accessible via Interstate 35 and U.S. Highway 53 (Piedmont Avenue). Other major routes that run through Lincoln Park are Interstate 35 and 24th Avenue West.

== See also ==
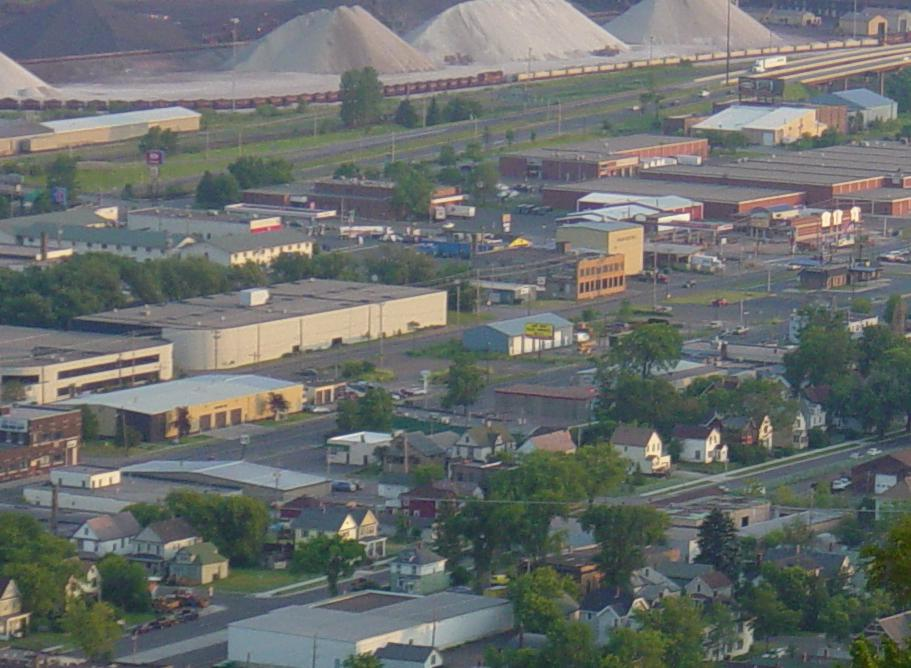
Part of Lincoln Park, as viewed from Duluth's Enger Tower

- Duluth, Minnesota
- Central Hillside and Downtown Duluth (east)
- Denfeld (west), part of West Duluth
- Piedmont Heights (north)
- Superior, Wisconsin (south, across I-535 and U.S. 53 – the John Blatnik Bridge)
- Interstate Highway 35
