= Endion School =

- U.S. National Register of Historic Places
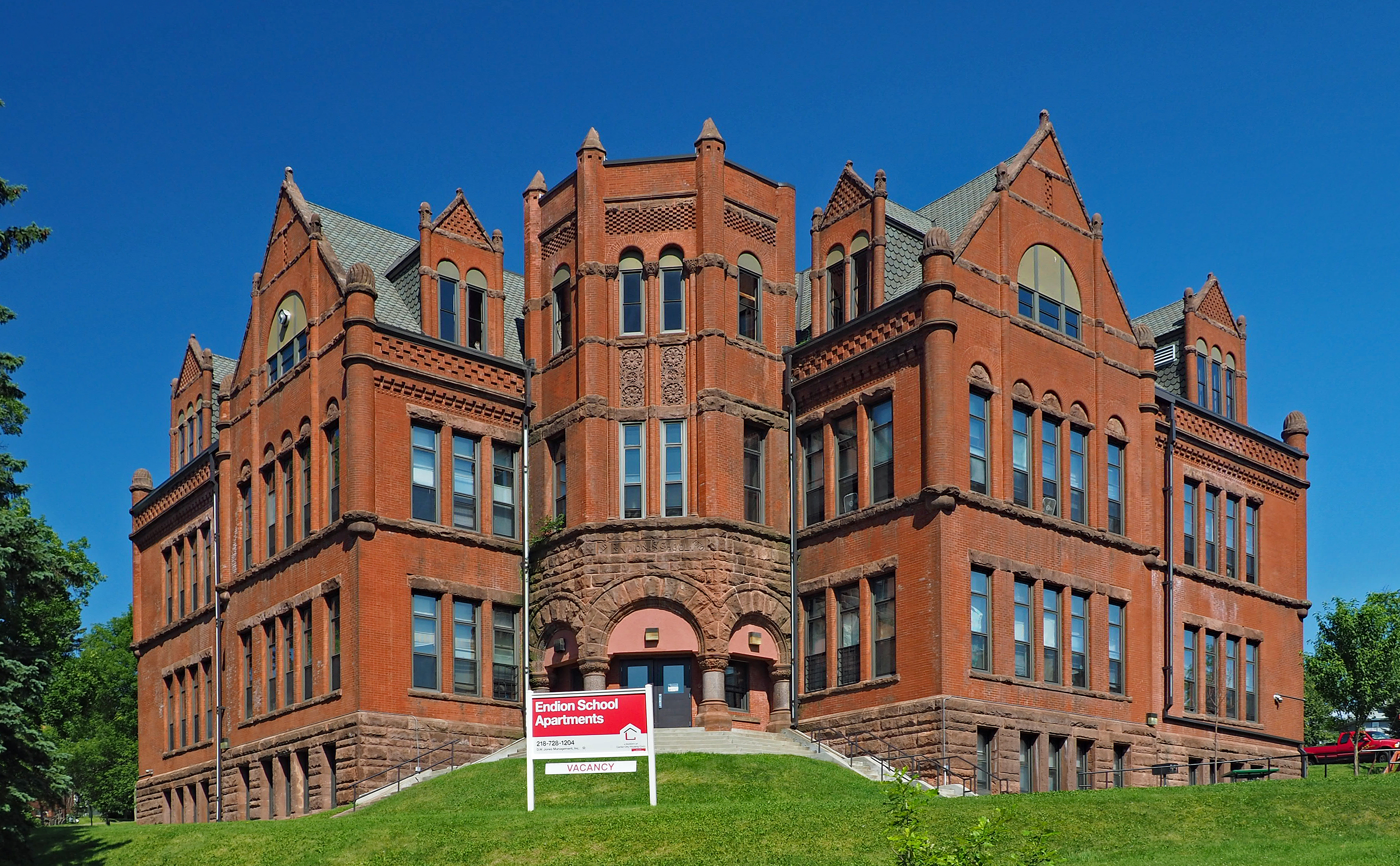
- Endion School viewed from the southeast

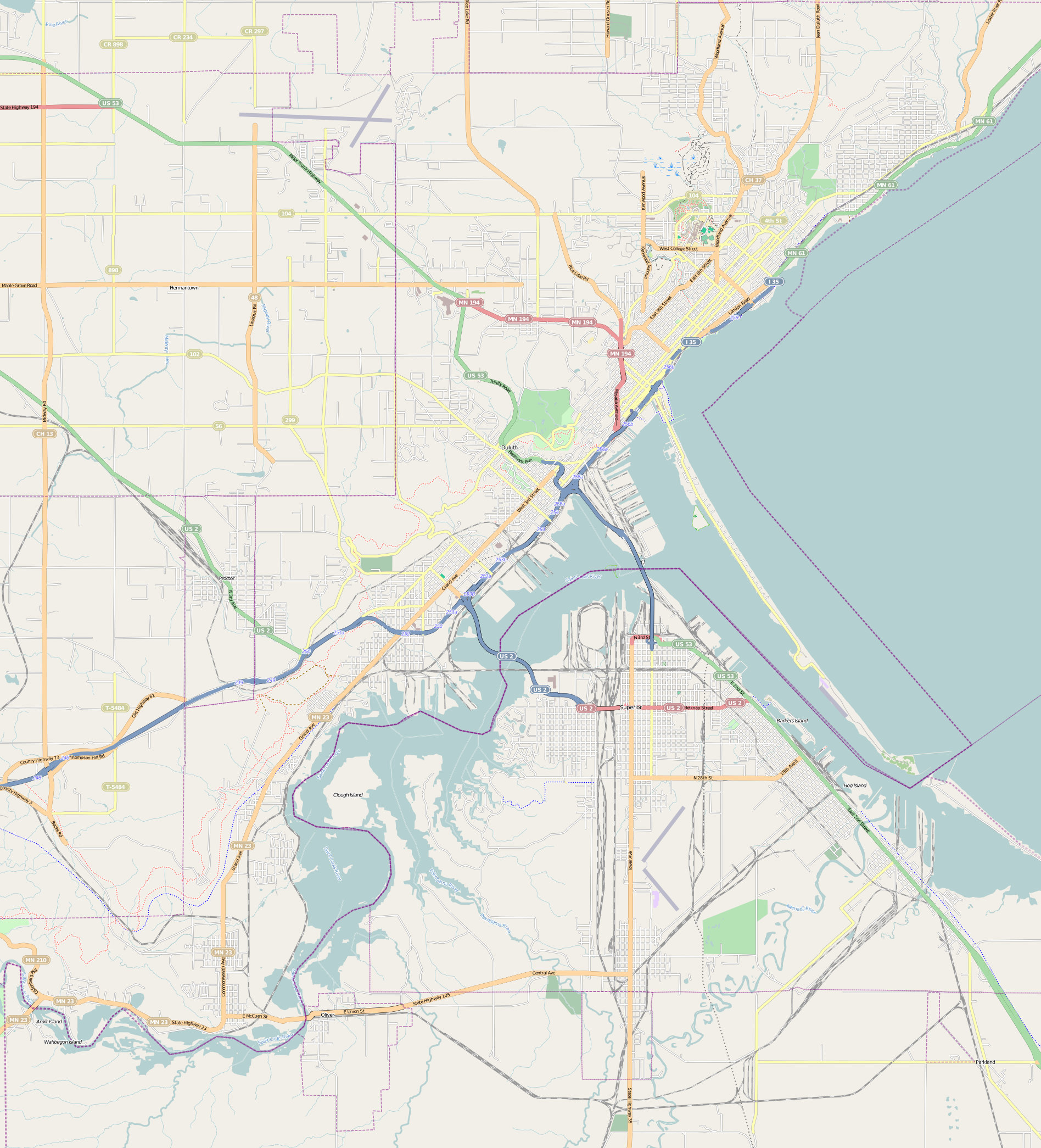
- Location within Duluth Location within Minnesota Location within the United States
- Location: 1801 E. 1st Street, Duluth, Minnesota
- Coordinates: 46°48′19″N 92°4′37″W
- Area: 1 acre (0.40 ha)
- Built: 1890
- Architect: Adolph F. Rudolph
- Architectural style: Richardsonian Romanesque
- NRHP reference No.: 83000946
- Added to NRHP: February 10, 1983

Endion School is a former school building in the East End/Endion neighborhood of Duluth, Minnesota, United States. Built in ornate Richardsonian Romanesque style with a unique design on a prominent hilltop site, it has been a local landmark since its construction in 1890. Endion School was listed on the National Register of Historic Places in 1983 for its local significance in the theme of architecture. It was nominated as the finest surviving example of Duluth's Late Victorian school buildings.

The footprint of Endion School is two squares overlapping at one corner. This unique design by local architect Adolph F. Rudolph allowed for classrooms with windows on two sides radiating around a central staircase.

A two-story annex was added to the rear of the building in 1953. It was placed at a slight distance with a connecting hallway so all four of the original wing's ornate façades would remain visible. Endion School closed in the 1970s. It has since reopened as an apartment building.

== See also ==
- National Register of Historic Places listings in St. Louis County, Minnesota
