= Bayview Heights (Duluth) =

Neighborhood of Duluth, Minnesota

Coordinates: 46.7505°N 92.2138°W

Bayview Heights is a primarily residential neighborhood in Duluth, Minnesota, United States. Although it is grouped by the city with the West Duluth communities, it often functions more as a part of the city of Proctor than of Duluth, due primarily to its hilltop location (1200 feet or roughly 400 m above sea level) rather than the 600 feet or roughly 200 m above sea level typical of West Duluth neighborhoods.

The neighborhood is centered on Duluth's Vinland Street, where the elementary school, affiliated with Proctor's school district, is located. Vinland Street begins in Proctor as 5th Street, changes its name at the Boundary Avenue intersection (which is the Duluth – Proctor boundary line), and ends at the "Bayview" intersection.

The "Bayview" intersection in Duluth's Bayview Heights neighborhood is the meeting point for Vinland Street, Getchell Road, Skyline Parkway, and Highland Street. Highland Street follows downhill to West Duluth; Getchell Road follows the opposite direction to Hermantown; and scenic Skyline Parkway continues its journey through the city of Duluth. Keene Creek flows through at the eastern edge of the neighborhood.

== See also ==
- Duluth, Minnesota
- Proctor, Minnesota
- West Duluth

== Adjacent neighborhoods ==
(Directions following those of Duluth's general street grid system, not actual geographical coordinates)

- City of Proctor (west)
- Cody (east)
- City of Hermantown (north)
- Piedmont Heights (east)
- Norton Park (south)
