= Judge C. R. Magney State Park =

State park in Minnesota, United States

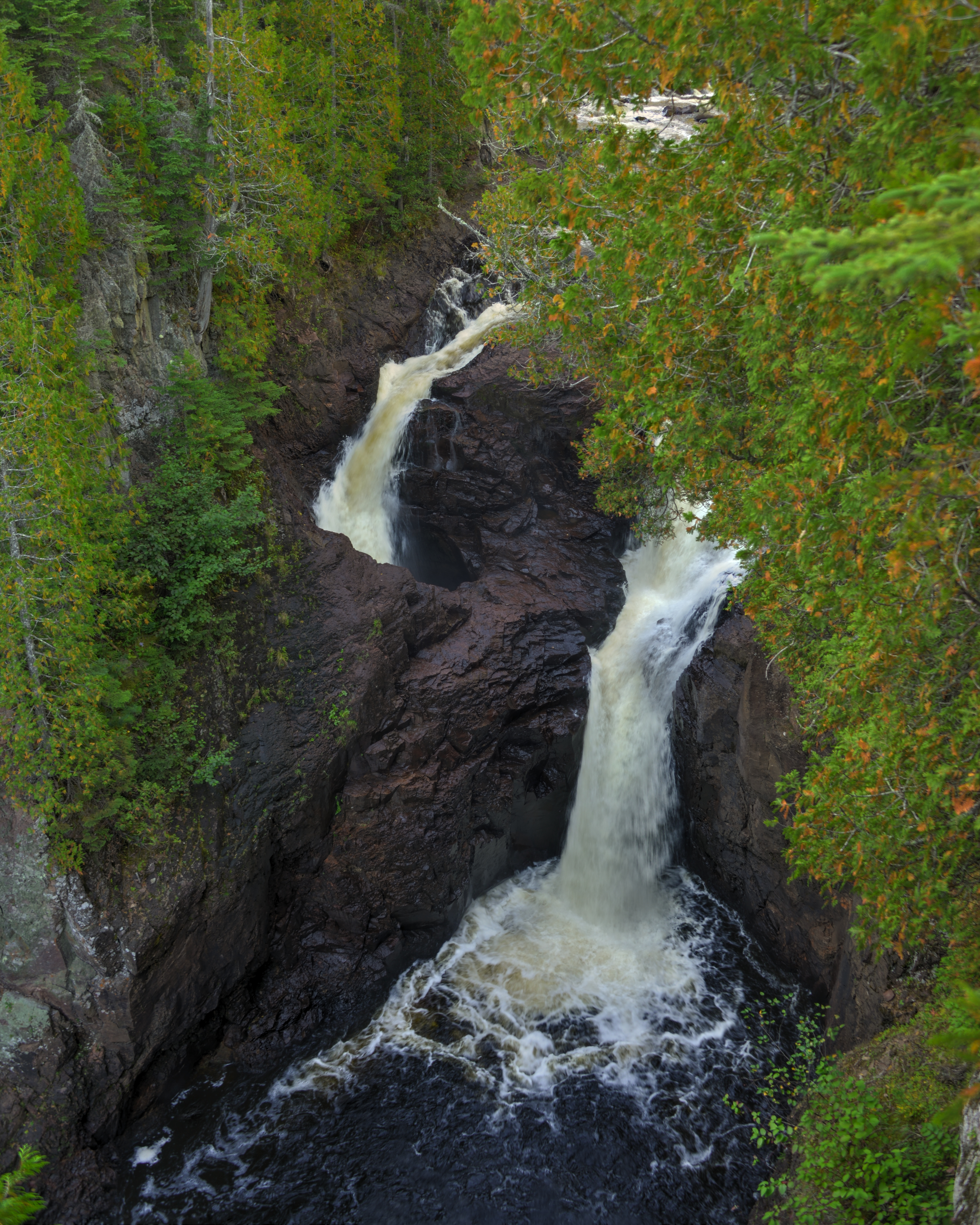
- Devil's Kettle at Judge C. R. Magney State Park

- Location within Minnesota Location within the United States
- Location: Cook, Minnesota, United States
- Coordinates: 47°51′4″N 90°3′30″W
- Area: 4,643 acres (18.79 km^{2})
- Elevation: 1,073 ft (327 m)
- Established: 1957
- Named for: Clarence R. Magney
- Governing body: Minnesota Department of Natural Resources

Judge C. R. Magney State Park is a state park in the U.S. state of Minnesota, on Lake Superior's North Shore. It was named for Clarence R. Magney, a former mayor of Duluth and justice of the Minnesota Supreme Court who was instrumental in getting 11 state parks and scenic waysides established along the North Shore. The park is best known for the Devil's Kettle, an unusual waterfall and rock formation in which half of the Brule River disappears into a pothole and reemerges underground downstream.

== Geography ==
Judge C. R. Magney State Park is on Minnesota State Highway 61, 25 miles (40 km) from the Canada–United States border. The last 8 miles (13 km) of the Brule River flow through the park, dropping 800 feet (240 m) and producing several waterfalls and cascades.

A tributary of the Brule, Gauthier Creek, flows in from the west. Mons Creek, an intermittent stream on the park's northeast border, drains a small marsh. This stretch of the Brule River has three named waterfalls. At 1 mile (1.6 km) from the lakeshore, Lower Falls drops 7 feet (2.1 m) over two steps just before the mouth of Gauthier Creek.

A short distance upstream are the Upper Falls, dropping 25 feet (7.6 m), and Devil's Kettle Falls. From the Devil's Kettle to Upper Falls the river flows through a 1/4-mile (0.40 km; 400 m) rocky gorge, as does the last 1/2 mile (0.80 km; 800 m) of Gauthier Creek.

Developed areas and trail access are confined to the park's lower third. The northern section is rugged and difficult to access, with open ridges stepping away from the river valley. These extremes produce an elevation change of about 1,000 feet (300 m) within the park. The park is within Grand Portage State Forest, although most of the land directly adjacent to the park is privately owned inholdings. The park has a continental climate of extreme seasonal variation, moderated by Lake Superior, which keeps the shore areas 6 to 8 °F (3.3 to 4.4 °C; 3.3 to 4.4 K) warmer in winter and cooler in summer than the inland part of the region. Winters tend to be mild and snowy.

== Natural history ==
=== Geology ===
The park is underlain by alternating layers of basalt and rhyolite, which erupted from the Midcontinent Rift System 1.1 billion years ago when the middle of the North American Plate began to crack. These layers bear intrusions of gabbro and diabase in the north and ferrodiorite in the south near the lakeshore. The rift itself formed a great basin, which gradually filled with sedimentary rock. The volcanic layers to either side became tilted; the basalt and rhyolite layers underneath the park dip about 12° and are estimated to be some 4,800 feet (1,500 m) thick altogether.

From 2 million years ago to 10,000 years ago a series of glacial periods repeatedly covered the region with ice, scouring the bedrock and scooping out the accumulated rock in the great basin. As the glaciers began to melt at the end of the last glacial period, pockets of rock and dirt till were left behind while the basin filled with meltwater, forming glacial Lake Duluth. A layer of red sediment with clay minerals remains from this time on the park's flat, inland areas. The changing configuration of the receding glaciers, plus post-glacial rebound of the surrounding land, altered the glacial Great Lakes' depth and area. The succession of lake levels left a series of beach ridges, wave-cut bluffs, and terraces at several elevations. These land forms are visible all along Minnesota's North Shore, but Judge C. R. Magney State Park is the only park bearing the complete series from the high water of Glacial Lake Duluth to the level of Glacial Lake Nipissing just above the current Superior shore. As the lake levels changed, so did the rivers flowing into them. Several former stream beds and deltas are at the park's southern end. The campground sits on a delta, and a former stream bed lies directly opposite the park entrance.

=== Devil's Kettle ===
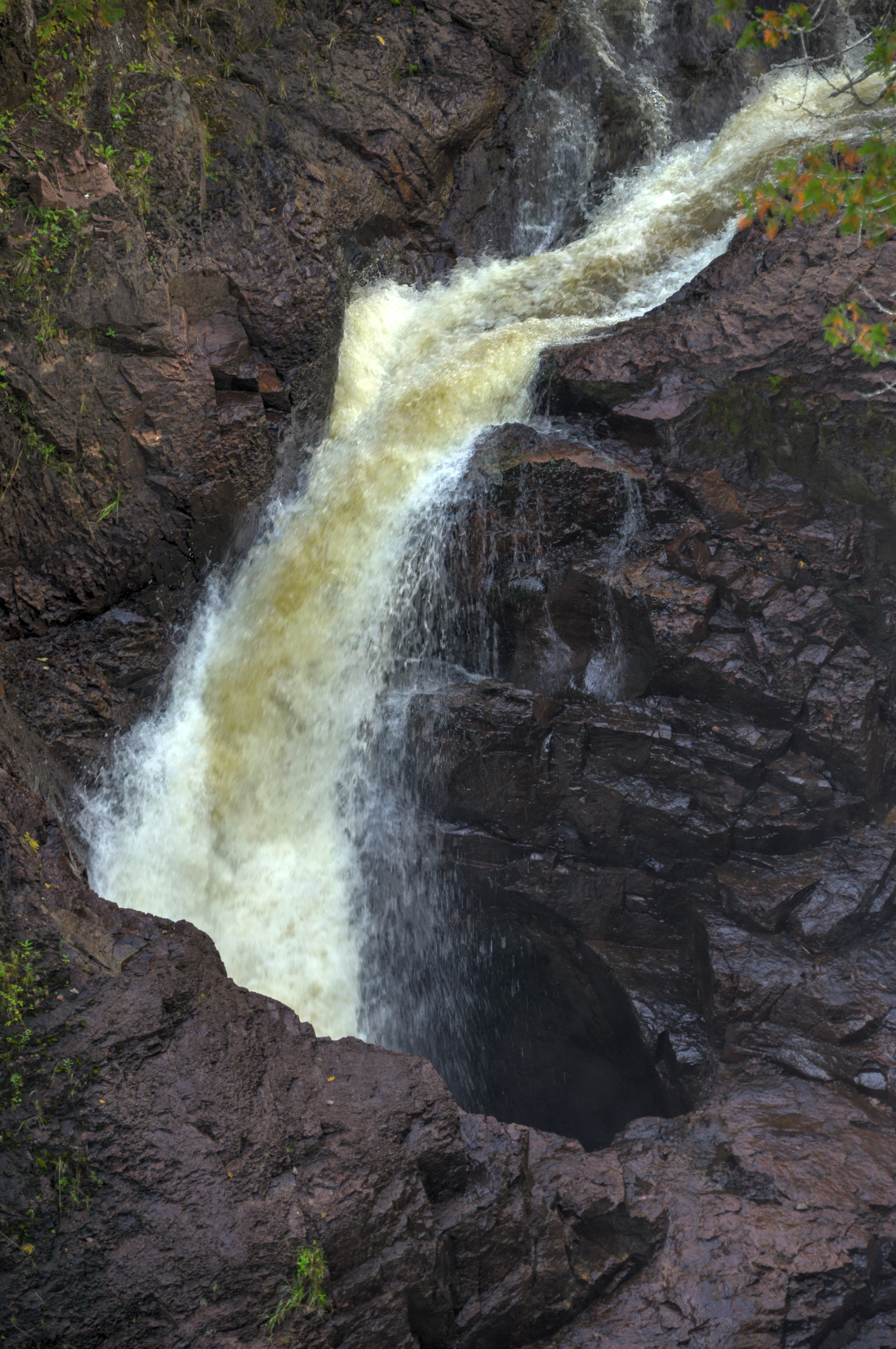
The Devil's Kettle.

The park is best known for "The Devil's Kettle", an unusual waterfall on the Brule River 1.5 miles (2.4 km) from its mouth. The river splits to flow around a mass of rhyolite rock. The eastern flow goes over a two-step, 50-foot (15 m) waterfall and continues downstream. The western flow surges into a pothole, falling at least 10 feet (3 m), from where it was popularly understood to "disappear underground".

Visitors have reportedly dropped sticks, ping-pong balls, and GPS trackers into the Devil's Kettle without seeing them resurface downstream. According to legend, someone once pushed a car into the fissure, but given that the Devil's Kettle is wholly inaccessible by road, most commentators have dismissed this as hyperbole. These stories have led to speculation that the channel had a separate outlet into Lake Superior, or more implausibly plunged deep underground or connected to another watershed entirely.

For decades, no satisfactory geological explanation was offered for the Devil's Kettle phenomenon, and it was a popular regional mystery. The underlying rock is not suitable for large underground passages, which are generally restricted to porous rock like limestone. Although lava tubes can form in certain igneous rock, they cannot appear in rhyolite, and the underlying basalt is both too deep and not formed in the proper volcanic conditions for tubes. The area is not known to contain any faults, and even if it did, it would not be permeable enough to drain half the river.

Experiments conducted in 2016 and announced by the Minnesota Department of Natural Resources (DNR) in February 2017 strongly indicate that the disappearing water simply flows back into the Brule River shortly below the falls. At state hydrologist Jeff Green's suggestion, two DNR experts measured the water flow above the falls and several hundred feet (meters) below them. The two readings were virtually identical, suggesting no water was being lost to another outlet. They said visitors' floating objects failed to reemerge because the kettle's plunge pool's currents are strong enough to hold most material down until it is pulverized.

Green and a colleague planned to conduct a dye tracing experiment in the fall of 2017 when water flows dropped again, in hopes of determining where the underground channel rejoins the main river, but park management discouraged them from doing so. They decided (under duress) that the dye experiment was not scientifically necessary to confirm that the water simply rejoins the river below the falls.

=== Flora and fauna ===
With an elevation change of 1,000 feet (300 m), Judge C. R. Magney State Park supports a wide variety of flora and fauna. The park contains Laurentian Mixed Forest, comprising both conifers and broadleafs. Before European settlement the Brule River Valley was forested mostly with white pine. Extensive logging and forest fires have altered the park's vegetation significantly, except around the rocky and inaccessible ridgetops. Today's secondary forest is dominated by aspen and birch, with stands of white spruce, sugar maple, and basswood. A few remnant stands of white pine survive on hilltops and ravines, especially along Gauthier Creek. Large northern white cedars are abundant along the river. Inland are many dense stands of white spruce, the result of planting and vigorous natural reseeding after the timber harvests. Around the waterfalls, the constant mist creates a microclimate conducive to several plant species not found elsewhere in the park.

The large mammals found in the park, particularly in the remote northern section, are white-tailed deer, moose, black bears, red foxes, and timber wolves. Smaller mammals include groundhogs, red squirrels, eastern chipmunks, martens, and snowshoe hares. Broad-winged hawks, barred owls, and great horned owls are prevalent, and many other raptor species pass through the park during their migration. Several species of warblers nest in the park. The Brule River and its tributary Gauthier Creek have spawning runs of rainbow trout in spring and salmon in the fall.

White-tailed deer are not endemic to northern Minnesota, having expanded into the region to take advantage of the plant regrowth during the logging period. In the 1940s and 1950s, as many as 300 deer per square mile were observed. The population has dropped as the forest has matured, but the deer still pose a management challenge as they overgraze young trees of certain species, altering the forest's composition. The park has fenced deer exclosures around reseeded white pines.

== Cultural history ==
The Ojibwe called the river Wiskode-zibi (Half-burned Wood River), which was translated directly into French as Bois Brulé and shortened by English speakers to "Brule River". The name likely refers to an early forest fire. Fires played a significant role in the park's early history. A series of fires in northern Wisconsin in 1892 to 1894 forced lumber companies to abandon that area and cross Lake Superior to begin logging the North Shore even though the quality of the timber was lower. The Red Cliff Lumber Company was headquartered a few miles west of the Brule River, and much of the future park was logged at that time. Logging practices of the day foreshortened the harvest of North Shore timber too, as slash left on the ground for several dry years fueled a devastating fire in 1908. Droughts and fires bedeviled the North Shore for the next 30 years. In 1928 the General Logging Company began harvesting second-growth wood in the Brule and Cascade River valleys for a pulp mill in Grand Marais, but in 1931 a devastating fire burned 25,000 acres (10,000 ha) and brought the industry to a halt.

The slowly regenerating Brule Valley very nearly became an exclusive resort for the wealthy, as entrepreneurs from Duluth formed the Naniboujou Club and planned a luxurious lakeside complex with a 150-room lodge, cabins, bathhouses, tennis courts, a golf course, and a swimming pool, all powered by a hydroelectric dam on the Brule. With a membership of almost 600, the club purchased 3,300 acres (1,300 ha) along the shoreline and planned to buy another 8,000 acres (3,200 ha) inland. The Naniboujou Club Lodge was completed in July 1929, but then the Wall Street Crash of 1929 struck that October, triggering the Great Depression. The rest of the complex was never built, and the lodge went through a succession of owners and periods of closure.

Instead of wealthy families, the future park's next residents were homeless men. In 1934 the state bought 3,000 acres (1,200 ha) from the Naniboujou Club and opened a "transient camp" on the Brule River to provide work and housing for men made homeless by the Depression. At first it was managed by the state's Division of Forestry and named the Grover Conzet Camp after its director, but at the end of 1936 it was transferred to the federal Works Progress Administration. The camp had 14 barracks, two recreation halls, two bathhouses, a dining hall, a bakery, three workshops, an office, a garage, a warehouse, and a root cellar. About 800 men rotated through the camp, conducting forestry projects such as planting trees and building fire roads. They also developed a small public park and built the trail and stairs leading to the Devil's Kettle. The enrollees farmed some of their own food and battled a 1936 forest fire that burned 10,000 acres (4,000 ha) north of Hovland. After the fire they built a sawmill and salvaged some of the downed wood. In return the men received wages, medical services, clothing, running water, and access to reading material and a radio. Despite these benefits a visiting timber union leader managed to foment a rebellion in February 1938 during which the administrators were briefly ejected from camp before state and local officials restored order. The WPA left in July 1938 and the U.S. Indian Service converted the facility into a camp for Ojibwe youth. Several camp buildings' concrete foundations are visible in the park's campground and picnic area.

In 1957, the Minnesota Legislature established Brule River State Park and appropriated $5,000 (equivalent to $57,316 in 2025) to purchase privately owned land within the 940-acre (380 ha) statutory boundaries. Clarence Magney, who had been instrumental in creating 11 state parks and waysides on the North Shore, died on May 14, 1962. The park was renamed in his honor in 1963, and in 1965 Judge C. R. Magney State Park was expanded to 4,500 acres (1,800 ha) by adding the section upstream from the Devil's Kettle. Development remained limited to a small campground, a picnic area, and the trail to the waterfalls. In 1987, a trail was added on the river's west bank.

== Recreation ==
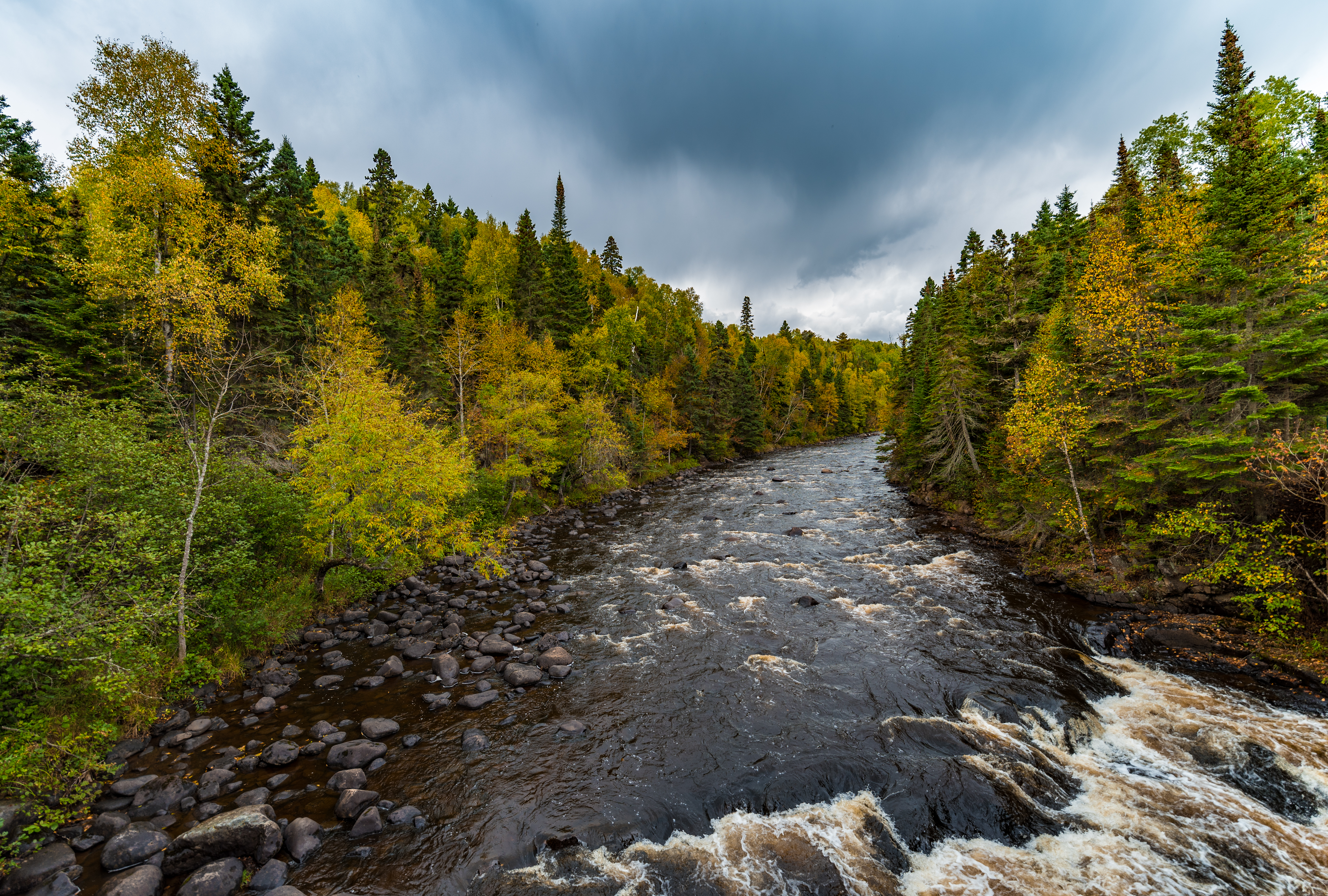
The Brule River in Judge C. R. Magney State Park.

Amenities are confined to the southern third of Judge C. R. Magney State Park. The summer-only campground has 27 sites and a sanitation building with flush toilets and showers. The historic, privately owned Naniboujou Club Lodge provides hotel accommodations directly across from the park entrance. The park has 9 miles (14 km) of hiking trails. The main hike is a strenuous 1.1-mile (1.8 km) walk to the Devil's Kettle and Upper and Lower Falls, including nearly 200 stairs. This route is part of the Superior Hiking Trail, which swings through the park but dead-ended there until 2003, when the northernmost 9 miles (14 km) were completed to the Canada–US border.

The Brule River is popular for its angling opportunities, as the Minnesota Department of Natural Resources has been stocking it with rainbow trout since 1930. The river also contains introduced brook trout, chinook salmon, and pink salmon during their respective spawning seasons. Anglers occasionally catch smallmouth bass and northern pike that entered the river from lakes upstream.

The Brule River also provides whitewater kayaking for experienced paddlers, who begin upstream of the park boundary and must portage around several stretches.

As Minnesota's only state park with minimal levels of light pollution, it is a pristine place for amateur astronomy with binoculars and small telescopes and night photography of the Milky Way.

== Media appearances ==
The Devil's Kettle is featured in Chuck Logan's 1998 crime novel The Big Law.

The 2009 horror film Jennifer's Body depicts a fictionalized version of the falls and a fictitious town named for them.

Naniboujou Lodge and the Devil's Kettle Falls featured in Monica Ferris's 2009 mystery anthology Sew Far, So Good.

In Minnesota author Peter Geye's historical novels The Lighthouse Road (2012) and Wintering (2016), this feature appears as The Devil's Maw and is an important part of the plot.

== Bibliography ==
- Collins, Bob (May 24, 2016). "The mystery of Devil's Kettle Falls". MPR News. (Article on falls with drone video from above the falls.)
