= Morley Heights / Parkview (Duluth) =

Neighborhood of Duluth, Minnesota

Coordinates: 46°50′50″N 92°3′30″W

Morley Heights / Parkview is a neighborhood in Duluth, Minnesota, United States.

Snively Road and Glenwood Street serve as main routes in the community. Amity Creek flows through the neighborhood.

== History ==
The neighborhood is named for industrialist Albert Morley Marshall.

Portions of Morley Heights were originally created in the 1920s as planned housing for employees of the Marshall–Wells Hardware Company. 80 homes were sold to employees at cost.

== Adjacent neighborhoods ==
(Directions following those of Duluth's general street grid system, not actual geographical coordinates)

- Lakeside – Lester Park (east)
- Congdon Park (south)
- Woodland (west)
- Hunter's Park (west)
- City of Rice Lake (north)
- Lakewood Township (north)

== External links and references ==
- City of Duluth website
- City map of neighborhoods (PDF)
