= Chester Park, Duluth =

Neighborhood in Duluth, Minnesota, US

Coordinates: 46.8134°N 92.0908°W

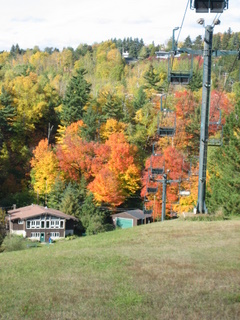
Downhill view of chalet and ski lift in autumn

Chester Park is a neighborhood in Duluth, Minnesota, United States.

8th Street, Kent Road, and Woodland Avenue are three of the main routes in the community.

== Park ==
Chester Park also refers to a large park adjacent to the neighborhood, located on East Skyline Parkway. Chester Park straddles both sides of a wooded ravine that contains Chester Creek, one of 28 streams that flow through the city. It is a popular hiking spot. The ravine opens at the top into a wide, wooded, "bowl"-shaped valley known as Chester Bowl and contains a small lift served ski area, ski jumps, pond, soccer field and cross country ski trails.

The parks ski jumps previously used to train Olympic ski jumpers were torn down in Aug. 2014 as safety hazards.

== Adjacent Neighborhoods ==
(Directions following those of Duluth's general street grid system, not actual geographical coordinates)

- Congdon Park (east)
- Hunter's Park (north)
- East End / Endion (south)
- Kenwood and East Hillside (west)
