= Hunter's Park (Duluth) =

Neighborhood in Duluth, Minnesota, US

Coordinates: 46°49′45″N 92°04′24″W

Hunter's Park (also spelled Hunters Park) is a neighborhood in Duluth, Minnesota, United States.

Woodland Avenue and Arrowhead Road are two of the main routes in the community.

The Hartley Nature Center, Hartley Park, and the Hartley hiking and bicycle trails are partially located within the neighborhood.

Tischer Creek flows through the neighborhood.

== Adjacent neighborhoods ==
(Directions following those of Duluth's general street grid system, not actual geographical coordinates)

- Morley Heights / Parkview (east)
- Congdon Park (east)
- Woodland (north)
- Chester Park (south)
- Kenwood (west)

== External links and references ==
- City of Duluth website
- City map of neighborhoods (PDF)
