= East Hillside (Duluth) =

Neighborhood of Duluth, Minnesota

Coordinates: 46°48′9″N 92°5′44″W

East Hillside is a neighborhood in the City of Duluth, Minnesota, United States.

East 4th Street serves as one of the main thoroughfares in the community, as well as a small business corridor. In addition to housing both renters and homeowners, East Hillside is the site of many of the major hospitals and clinics that serve Duluth and its surrounding areas.

Many families use Myers-Wilkins Elementary School, the Grant Recreation Facility, as well as many of the other parks located within the neighborhood. Chester Creek flows through at the eastern edge of the neighborhood.

== Adjacent neighborhoods ==
(Directions following those of Duluth's general street grid system, not actual geographical coordinates)

- Central Hillside (west)
- Downtown Duluth (west)
- East End / Endion (east)
- Chester Park / UMD (north, east)
- Kenwood (north)
