= Congdon Park (Duluth) =

Neighborhood in Duluth, Minnesota, US

Coordinates: 46.8212°N 92.0626°W

Congdon Park is a neighborhood in Duluth, Minnesota, United States.

London Road (MN 61) serves as one of the main routes in the community. Tischer Creek flows through the neighborhood.

The Northland Country Club and the Glensheen Historic Estate museum are both located within the neighborhood.

The area is named after Chester Congdon, who donated land for its establishment in 1908.

== Adjacent neighborhoods ==
(Directions following those of Duluth's general street grid system, not actual geographical coordinates)

- Morley Heights / Parkview (north)
- Lakeside – Lester Park (east)
- Hunter's Park (west)
- Chester Park (west)
- East End / Endion (west)
