= Bardon Peak =

Mountain in Minnesota, United States

Highest point
- Elevation: 1,243 ft (379 m)
- Coordinates: 46°41′23″N 92°14′09″W

Geography
- Location: Duluth, Minnesota, U.S.
- Topo map: USGS West Duluth

Bardon Peak is a peak in northeastern Minnesota, United States. It is located inside the southwestern city limits of Duluth, near the Gary – New Duluth neighborhood, and adjacent to Midway Township. The peak is located above the Morgan Park neighborhood. Bardon Peak was named for a James Bardon of nearby Superior, Wisconsin.

According to the city's official map, Bardon's Peak on West Skyline Parkway is located within the boundaries of the Smithville neighborhood.
