= Naniboujou Club Lodge =

- U.S. National Register of Historic Places
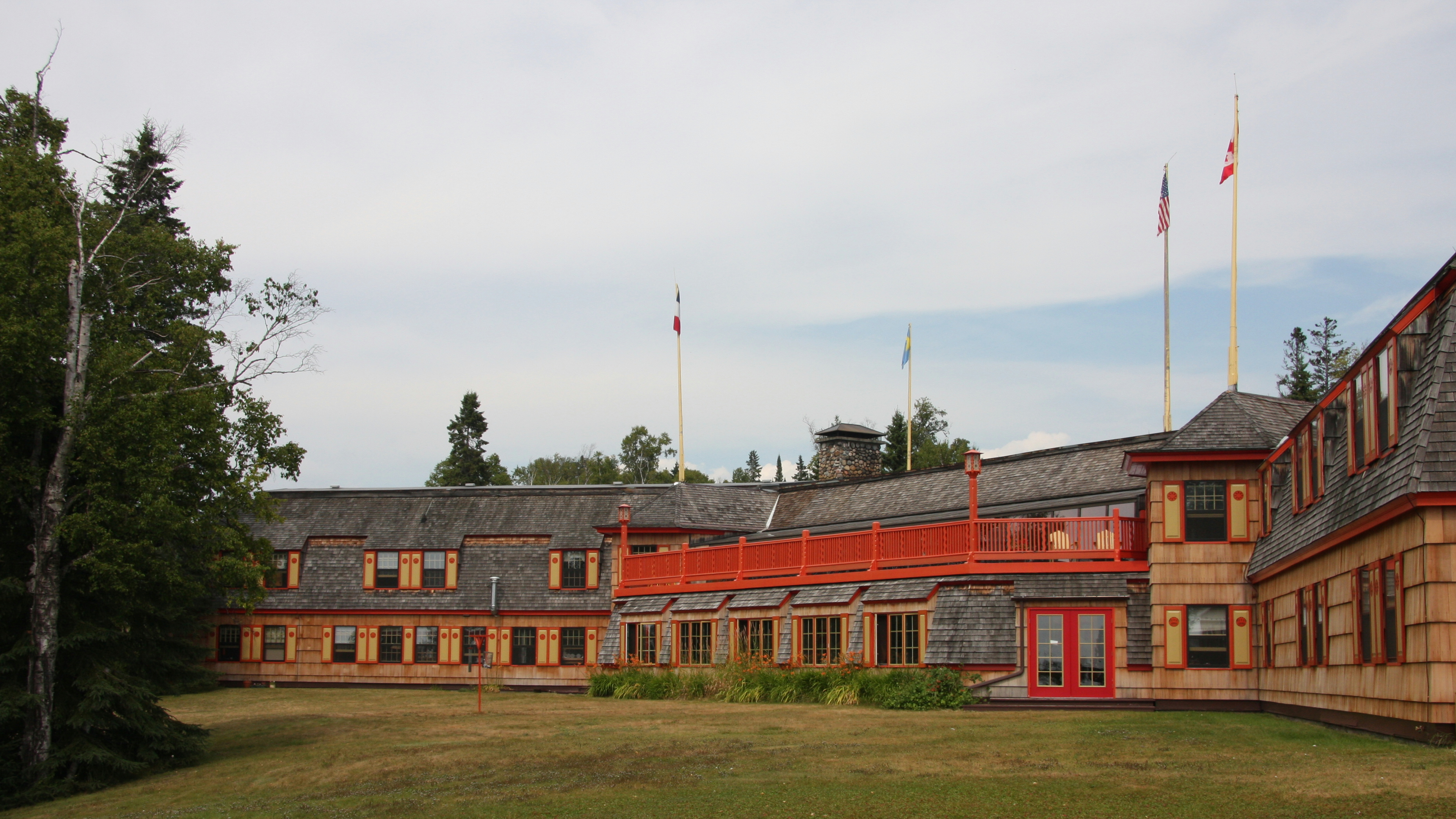
- Naniboujou Lodge in 2013

- Location within Minnesota Location within the United States
- Location: East Cook, Minnesota
- Nearest city: Grand Marais, Minnesota
- Coordinates: 47°49′.91″N 90°2′57.16″W
- Built: 1928
- Architects: Holstead & Sullivan, Duluth
- NRHP reference No.: 82000558
- Added to NRHP: October 21, 1982

The Naniboujou Club Lodge is a resort and restaurant built as part of a private club on the North Shore of Lake Superior in Cook County, Minnesota, United States, about 15 miles (24 km) east of Grand Marais. It is named after Naniboujou, a character from the Cree, and the lodge's décor has both Native American and Art Deco influences. Commenced in the twilight of the Jazz Age, the club's grandiose plans succumbed to the economic realities of the Great Depression, and only the clubhouse was built. That building retains its original design and is listed as a historic property.

== History ==
Wealthy businessmen from Duluth, Minnesota, planned a resort on 3,330 acres (1,350 ha) along the newly opened North Shore Highway and announced the project in 1927. The name selected was that of a Cree spirit of the woods, and the membership sales pitch was rooted in Indian legend. Ground was broken in 1928, and the club opened for business in 1929. Membership was to be limited, and free memberships were given to public figures of the day in order to attract other members. Members included celebrities Babe Ruth, Jack Dempsey, and Ring Lardner.

Plans included a golf course, swimming pool, tennis courts, a marina, a 150–room clubhouse, and an inland hunting lodge, but only a smaller clubhouse was built. Financial difficulties during the Great Depression led to foreclosure in 1935. The facility was sold in 1939. Much of the land became part of Judge C. R. Magney State Park, but the lakeshore property on which the lodge is located remained in private hands. Thereafter the lodge has had a number of owners, who operated it as part of a hotel chain and later as a family resort.

Ownership Chart

Owner	Owners of Naniboujou Lodge
Naniboujou Holding Company	Nov 1927 – 1935 (foreclosure)
Arthur Roberts Hotel Chain	1939–1953
Mr. and Mrs. Francis C. Hussey	1953–1963
Luther and Suzie Wallace	1963–1980
Campus Church	1980–1985
Tim And Nancy Ramey	1985–present

== Architecture and décor ==
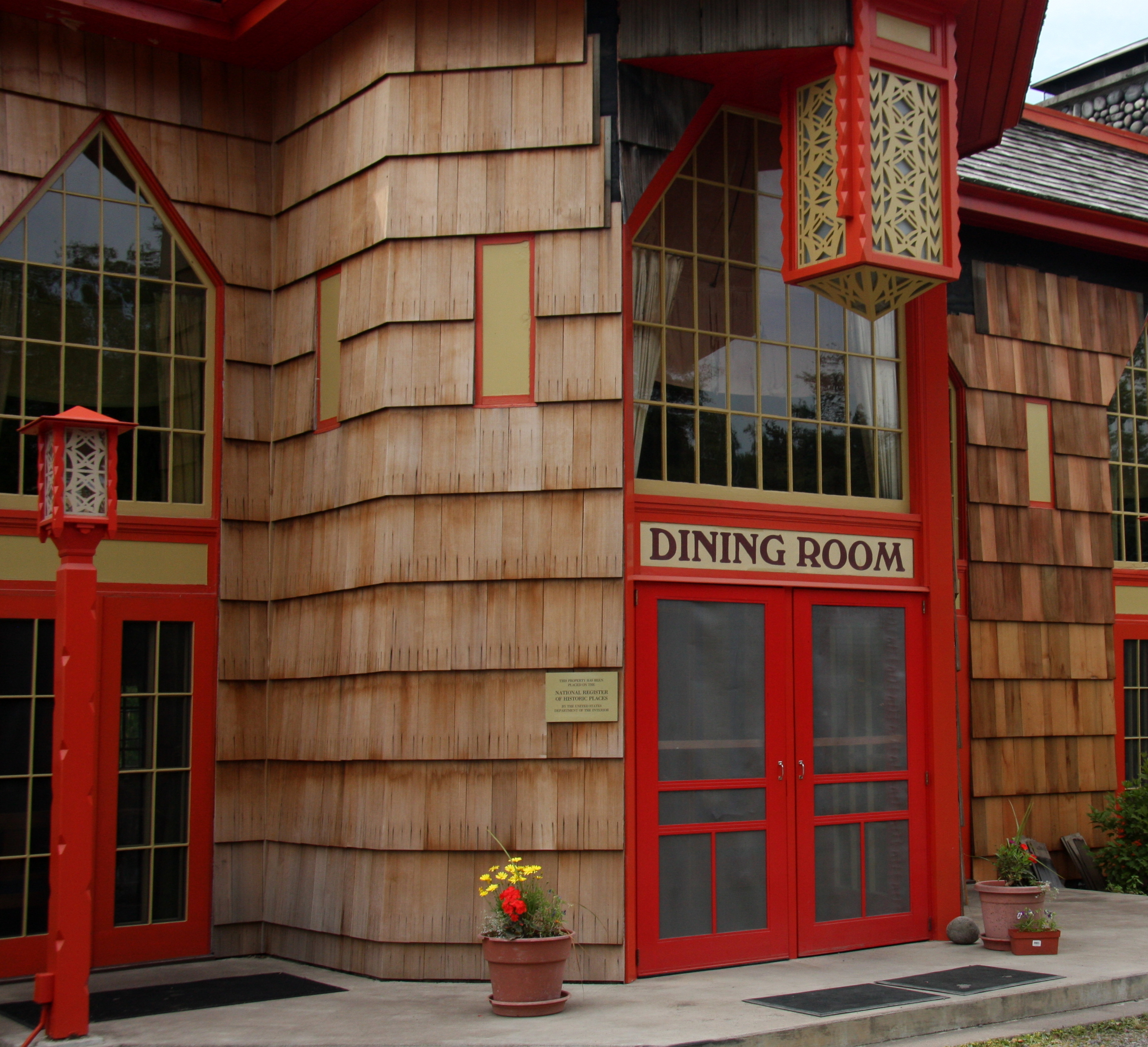
Naniboujou Dining Room entrance

The Naniboujou Club Lodge is on the National Register of Historic Places. It was nominated for the Register in 1982, as it had retained "its original design in a good state of preservation".

Design elements include architectural features such as polygonal towers, cedar shakes, a gambrel roof pierced by dormers, and French doors topped by sashes with pointed crowns. The Cree theme of the lodge is displayed in the common room, which has a 200-short-ton (180 t) native rock fireplace about 12 feet (3.7 m) high. Inset above the hearth is a native welcome symbol in the shape of a sunburst, made of the same water-rounded stone used in the fireplace. The chamber's walls and ceilings were painted by the artist Antoine Gouffe (who was of French descent and studied art in Paris) with other native-inspired designs and have been called a "psychedelic marriage of Art Deco and traditional Cree Indian patterns".

== The lodge today ==
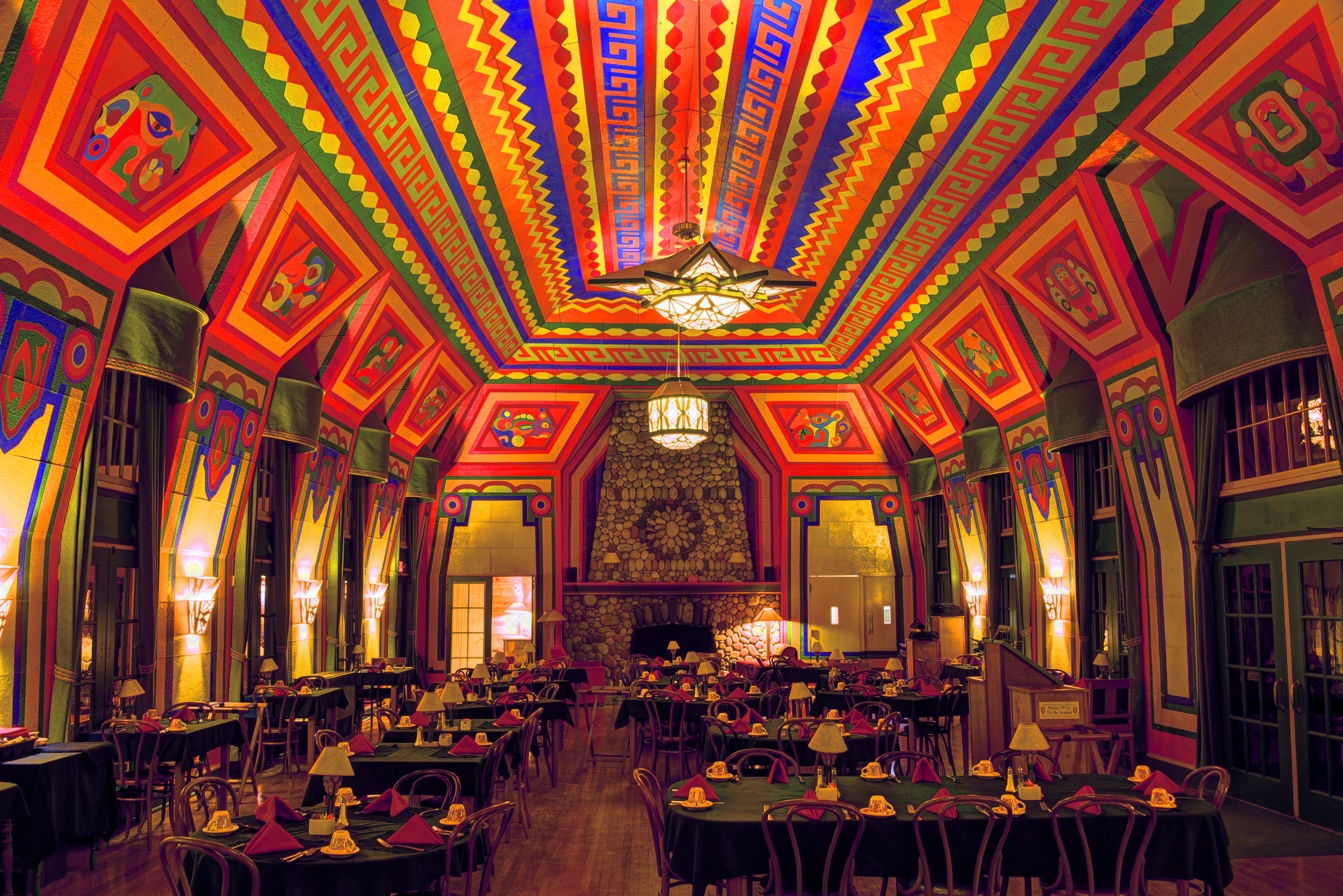
Naniboujou Lodge common room

Now known as Naniboujou Lodge and Restaurant, the property is a privately owned hotel and restaurant. The sleeping wings contain the hotel rooms, and the former common area, still bearing its original decoration, is now the dining hall. Later changes to the building have continued the Cree theme.

Facilities include a restaurant, in the former Great Hall club commons, and a solarium. Lake Superior and the Brule River adjoin the 9-acre (36,000 m^{2}) plot on which the resort is located. Across the highway are the exotic rock formations and natural beauties of Judge C. R. Magney State Park, created from the former club's lands, including the Devil's Kettle. Nearby are other state parks and the Superior National Forest, which offer canoeing, hiking, camping, and fishing in the North Woods and lakes of Minnesota's Arrowhead Region.

== Naniboujou in modern culture ==
Naniboujou Lodge has been featured in books on tourism in Minnesota or the North Shore. Monica Ferris' murder mystery novel Unraveled Sleeve is set at Naniboujou Lodge. Naniboujou Club Lodge has also been featured in Minnesota Monthly.

== Nanabozho ==
In Anishinaabe mythology, particularly among the Ojibwa, Nanabozho is a spirit who figures prominently in their storytelling, including their account of the world's creation. Nanabozho is the Ojibwe trickster figure and culture hero (these two archetypes are often combined into a single figure in First Nations mythologies). He plays a similar role as the Saulteaux Wiisagejaak (Cree Wisakedjak).
