= Neighborhoods of Duluth, Minnesota =

Map of Duluth neighborhoods

The city of Duluth, Minnesota has 32 neighborhoods organized into six geographic areas: Central, Eastern Duluth, Above the Hill, West Duluth, West of West Duluth, and Lincoln Park.

== Neighborhoods ==
=== Central ===
- Canal Park
- Central Hillside
- Downtown Duluth
- East Hillside
- Park Point

=== Eastern Duluth ===
- Chester Park / UMD
- Congdon Park
- East End / Endion
- Hunter's Park
- Lakeside – Lester Park
- Morley Heights / Parkview
- North Shore

=== Above the hill ===
- Duluth Heights
- Kenwood
- Piedmont Heights
- Woodland

=== West Duluth ===
- Bayview Heights
- Cody
- Denfeld
- Fairmount
- Irving
- Oneota
- Spirit Valley

=== West of West Duluth ===
- Fond du Lac
- Gary – New Duluth
- Norton Park
- Morgan Park
- Riverside
- Smithville

=== Lincoln Park ===
- Lincoln Park
- Goat Hill
- Rice’s Point
