= Irving (Duluth) =

Neighborhood of Duluth, Minnesota

Coordinates: 46°43′54.25″N 92°10′16.67″W

Irving is a neighborhood located within the West Duluth district of Duluth, Minnesota, United States. Raleigh Street, Central Avenue, and 59th Avenue West are three of the main routes in the community.

The Irving Park and Playfield and Grassy Point along the Saint Louis Bay are located within the Irving neighborhood. Keene Creek flows through the neighborhood.

== Adjacent neighborhoods ==
(Directions following those of Duluth's general street grid system, not actual geographical coordinates)

- Spirit Valley (north)
- Fairmount (west)
- Norton Park (south, west)

== External links and references ==
- City of Duluth website
- City map of neighborhoods (PDF)
