= Cody (Duluth) =

Neighborhood of Duluth, Minnesota

Coordinates: 46.7410°N 92.1718°W

Cody is a neighborhood located within the West Duluth district of Duluth, Minnesota, United States.

Cody Street, Highland Street, 59th Avenue West, and West 8th Street are four of the main routes in the Cody neighborhood. Keene Creek flows through the neighborhood.

== Adjacent neighborhoods ==
(Directions following those of Duluth's general street grid system, not actual geographical coordinates)

- Spirit Valley (south, east)
- Fairmount (south)
- Denfeld (east)
- Bayview Heights (west)
