= Proctor, Minnesota =

City in Minnesota, United States

Proctor
- City
- City of Proctor
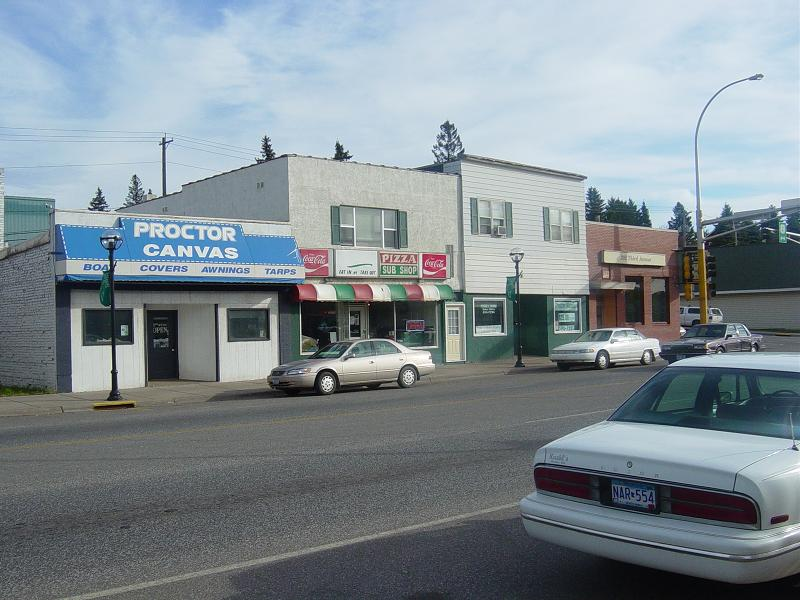
- Downtown Proctor along U.S. Highway 2
- Motto: You Have a Place in Proctor
- Location of the city of Proctor within Saint Louis County, Minnesota
- Coordinates: 46°44′36″N 92°13′32″W
- Country: United States
- State: Minnesota
- County: Saint Louis

Area
  - Total: 3.36 sq mi (8.71 km^{2})
  - Land: 3.36 sq mi (8.71 km^{2})
  - Water: 0 sq mi (0.00 km^{2})
- Elevation: 1,247 ft (380 m)

Population (2020)
  - Total: 3,120
  - Density: 928.2/sq mi (358.39/km^{2})
- Time zone: UTC-6 (Central (CST))
  - Summer (DST): UTC-5 (CDT)
- ZIP codes: 55810
- Area code: 218
- FIPS code: 27-52630
- GNIS feature ID: 0662232
- Website: https://proctormn.gov/

Proctor is a city in Saint Louis County, Minnesota, United States. Established in 1894, the town was named after former Kentucky Governor J. Proctor Knott. It is part of the Duluth Metropolitan Area. The population was 3,120 at the 2020 census.

== History ==
The city was established as Proctorknott in 1894, with the name coming from former Kentucky Governor J. Proctor Knott. Knott was famous for delivering the speech The Untold Delights of Duluth to the U.S. House of Representatives. The city's name was shortened to Proctor in 1904.

== Geography ==
According to the United States Census Bureau, the city has an area of 3.00 square miles (7.77 km^{2}), all land.

Proctor is adjacent to Duluth's Bayview Heights neighborhood, with which it forms something of a contiguous community unit due to Bayview Heights's topographical separation (the hill) from adjacent West Duluth. It is bounded by the city of Hermantown to the north, Midway Township to the west, Bayview Heights to the east, and a mostly undeveloped area of Duluth (officially in the Riverside neighborhood) to the south.

Kingsbury Creek flows through central Proctor. Knowlton Creek flows through southeast Proctor.

== Demographics ==
Historical population
Census	Pop.	Note	%±
1900	784		—
1910	2,243		186.1%
1920	2,378		6.0%
1930	2,521		6.0%
1940	2,468		−2.1%
1950	2,693		9.1%
1960	2,963		10.0%
1970	3,123		5.4%
1980	3,180		1.8%
1990	2,974		−6.5%
2000	2,852		−4.1%
2010	3,057		7.2%
2020	3,120		2.1%
U.S. Decennial Census

=== 2020 census ===
As of the 2020 census, Proctor had a population of 3,120. The median age was 41.4 years. 22.1% of residents were under the age of 18 and 20.1% of residents were 65 years of age or older. For every 100 females there were 102.3 males, and for every 100 females age 18 and over there were 97.4 males age 18 and over.

98.1% of residents lived in urban areas, while 1.9% lived in rural areas.

There were 1,313 households in Proctor, of which 27.0% had children under the age of 18 living in them. Of all households, 47.1% were married-couple households, 19.6% were households with a male householder and no spouse or partner present, and 24.9% were households with a female householder and no spouse or partner present. About 32.8% of all households were made up of individuals and 12.8% had someone living alone who was 65 years of age or older.

There were 1,373 housing units, of which 4.4% were vacant. The homeowner vacancy rate was 0.7% and the rental vacancy rate was 2.5%.

Racial composition as of the 2020 census
Race	Number	Percent
White	2,867	91.9%
Black or African American	15	0.5%
American Indian and Alaska Native	33	1.1%
Asian	29	0.9%
Native Hawaiian and Other Pacific Islander	0	0.0%
Some other race	18	0.6%
Two or more races	158	5.1%
Hispanic or Latino (of any race)	49	1.6%

=== 2010 census ===
As of the census of 2010, there were 3,057 people, 1,268 households, and 795 families living in the city. The population density was 1,019.0 inhabitants per square mile (393.4/km^{2}). There were 1,361 housing units at an average density of 453.7 per square mile (175.2/km^{2}). The racial makeup of the city was 96.8% White, 0.2% African American, 1.1% Native American, 0.4% Asian, 0.2% from other races, and 1.3% from two or more races. Hispanic or Latino of any race were 1.2% of the population.

There were 1,268 households, of which 27.4% had children under the age of 18 living with them, 48.8% were married couples living together, 9.6% had a female householder with no husband present, 4.3% had a male householder with no wife present, and 37.3% were non-families. 30.4% of all households were made up of individuals, and 13% had someone living alone who was 65 years of age or older. The average household size was 2.34 and the average family size was 2.90.

The median age in the city was 41.4 years. 20.7% of residents were under the age of 18; 8.2% were between the ages of 18 and 24; 25.5% were from 25 to 44; 29.7% were from 45 to 64; and 16.1% were 65 years of age or older. The gender makeup of the city was 49.3% male and 50.7% female.

=== 2000 census ===
As of the census of 2000, there were 2,852 people, 1,196 households, and 772 families living in the city. The population density was 942.8 inhabitants per square mile (364.0/km^{2}). There were 1,246 housing units at an average density of 411.9 per square mile (159.0/km^{2}). The racial makeup of the city was 96.49% White, 0.14% African American, 1.16% Native American, 0.53% Asian, 0.28% from other races, and 1.40% from two or more races. Hispanic or Latino of any race were 0.74% of the population. 19.8% were of German, 17.9% Norwegian, 10.3% Swedish, 7.3% French, 7.0% Finnish, 6.2% Polish, 6.0% Irish and 5.4% Italian ancestry.

There were 1,196 households, out of which 28.6% had children under the age of 18 living with them, 51.5% were married couples living together, 10.6% had a female householder with no husband present, and 35.4% were non-families. 30.8% of all households were made up of individuals, and 17.1% had someone living alone who was 65 years of age or older. The average household size was 2.38 and the average family size was 2.99.

In the city, the population was spread out, with 24.0% under the age of 18, 9.4% from 18 to 24, 27.3% from 25 to 44, 23.6% from 45 to 64, and 15.8% who were 65 years of age or older. The median age was 38 years. For every 100 females, there were 86.6 males. For every 100 females age 18 and over, there were 85.8 males.

The median income for a household in the city was $38,322, and the median income for a family was $49,875. Males had a median income of $33,583 versus $22,035 for females. The per capita income for the city was $18,851. About 3.2% of families and 5.0% of the population were below the poverty line, including 5.5% of those under age 18 and 5.9% of those age 65 or over.

== Politics ==
Presidential election results

Precinct General Election Results
Year	Republican	Democratic	Third parties
2020	40.6% 790	56.8% 1,106	2.6% 51
2016	37.8% 655	52.2% 903	10.0% 173
2012	29.8% 525	67.6% 1,193	2.6% 46
2008	29.9% 546	67.6% 1,234	2.5% 46
2004	29.0% 511	69.9% 1,233	1.1% 20
2000	28.2% 443	66.2% 1,042	5.6% 88
1996	22.5% 348	66.6% 965	9.9% 147
1992	19.8% 327	61.8% 1,019	18.4% 304
1988	27.0% 392	73.0% 1,062	0.0% 0
1984	25.1% 394	74.9% 1,178	0.0% 0
1980	22.9% 376	71.9% 1,179	5.2% 85
1976	24.7% 372	73.4% 1,106	1.9% 26
1968	14.3% 195	83.3% 1,133	2.4% 33
1964	14.8% 213	85.1% 1,224	0.1% 2
1960	31.1% 442	68.7% 977	0.2% 4

== Culture ==
Proctor is the home of the South Saint Louis County Fairgrounds and the Proctor Speedway.

The Proctor Hoghead Festival takes place every August. Hoghead celebrates Proctor's railroad history.

The Proctor Area Museum is operated by the Proctor Area Historical Society.

Proctor is the starting point for the Blackwoods Blizzard Tour, an annual snowmobile ride around northern Minnesota that raises money to fight ALS. The ride goes from Proctor up to Tower, over to Two Harbors, and returns to Proctor. The organization raises over $1 million every year for ALS research, making it the largest snowmobile fundraiser in the world.

== Infrastructure ==
=== Public transit ===
- Duluth Transit Authority

=== Major highways ===
- U.S. Highway 2
- Interstate 35

== Education ==
Proctor's public school district is Proctor Public Schools. It encompasses Proctor, Duluth's Bayview Heights neighborhood, and Canosia, Grand Lake, Midway, and Solway townships. ISD 704 operates two elementary schools (Bayview Heights and Pike Lake), Jedlicka Middle School, and Proctor High School.
