= Kenwood (Duluth) =

Coordinates: 46.8295°N 92.1362°W

Kenwood is a neighborhood in Duluth, Minnesota, United States.

Kenwood Avenue and Arrowhead Road are two of the main routes in the community.

== Notes ==
Businesses in Kenwood's small business district include a grocery store, an automotive service shop, restaurants, and several other local businesses.

Chester Creek flows through the Kenwood neighborhood.

City bus routes providing service to Kenwood include the following:

- #18 (UMD / CSS)
- #12 (Kenwood)
- #13 and 13U (UMD–Woodland)
- #11 and #11K (East 8th–UMD).

== Adjacent neighborhoods ==
(Directions following those of Duluth's general street grid system, not actual geographical coordinates)

- Chester Park, UMD, and Hunter's Park (east)
- Duluth Heights (west)
- East Hillside (south)
- City of Rice Lake (north)
