= Piedmont Heights (Duluth) =

Neighborhood of Duluth, Minnesota

Coordinates: 46.7737°N 92.1484°W

Piedmont Heights is a neighborhood in Duluth, Minnesota, United States.

Piedmont Avenue, Chambersburg Avenue, and Morris Thomas Road are three of the main routes in the community. The neighborhood is located between Haines Road and Skyline Parkway.

== Notes ==
A small business district, as well as Piedmont Elementary School are centrally located in the neighborhood. Piedmont Heights also has a community center with two hockey rinks and a baseball field. The community center is also home to several local softball and hockey teams. The neighborhood is mostly suburban in character, with scenic views of the Duluth Harbor and the Saint Louis Bay.

Miller Creek flows through at the eastern edge of the neighborhood.

== Adjacent neighborhoods ==
(Directions following those of Duluth's general street grid system, not actual geographical coordinates)

- Duluth Heights (northeast)
- City of Hermantown (west)
- Lincoln Park (south)
- Cody (southwest)

== See also ==
- Piedmont (United States), a plateau region of the eastern United States
- Piedmont (Italy), a region of northwestern Italy
- Piedmont (disambiguation) – places and things known as Piedmont
- Saint Louis Bay
- Morris Thomas Road
