= West Duluth =

Neighborhood of Duluth, Minnesota

Coordinates: 46°44′08″N 92°11′11″W

West Duluth refers to an official neighborhood district in the west–central part of Duluth, Minnesota, United States.

Grand Avenue, Central Avenue, Cody Street, and Interstate Highway 35 are four of the main routes in West Duluth. Other main routes include 40th Avenue West, 46th Avenue West, and Mike Colalillo Drive.

== Neighborhoods ==
Seven neighborhoods are located within the official West Duluth district boundaries:

- Cody
- Denfeld
- Fairmount
- Irving
- Oneota
- Spirit Valley
- Bayview Heights (associated more with Proctor, Minnesota)

== Geography & Population ==
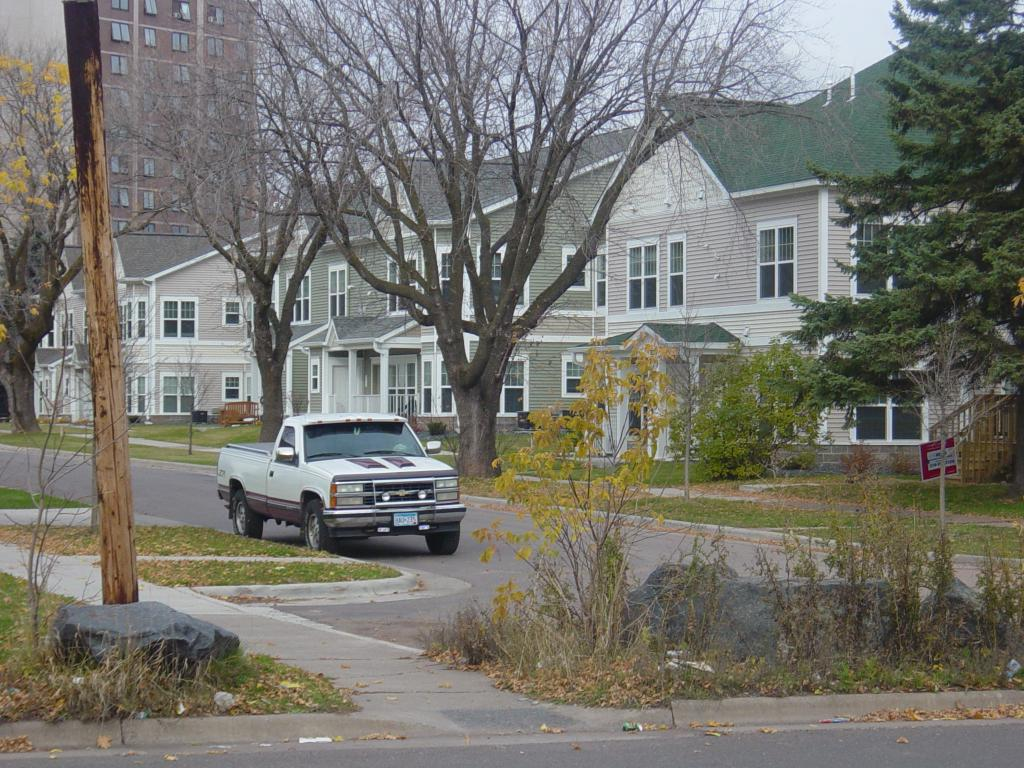
A new local rowhouse (townhome) development.

West Duluth covers an area of 5,726 acres (23 km^{2}), or 13% of the city area, making it the third-largest district in the city. Note that, as with many other Duluth neighborhood districts, the area actually developed to a major extent is considerably smaller than the district figure. This is largely due to the harsh topography (hills) of the area.

The 2000 census enumerated 11,431 residents in the district, a 3% change from 1990. 23.8% of the population is under 18, and 15.7% over 65. 73.5% of households are owned, slightly higher than the city figure of 64.1%. The official figure places household density at just 0.85 / acre, but in most areas where development has actually taken place the density is much higher. As with the rest of the city, the housing stock tends to be very old by American standards, with a large percentage (most likely a majority) of homes having been built before 1939.

The entrance to the Bong Bridge (U.S. Highway 2) is located within West Duluth at 46th Avenue West.

== West Duluth's Center ==
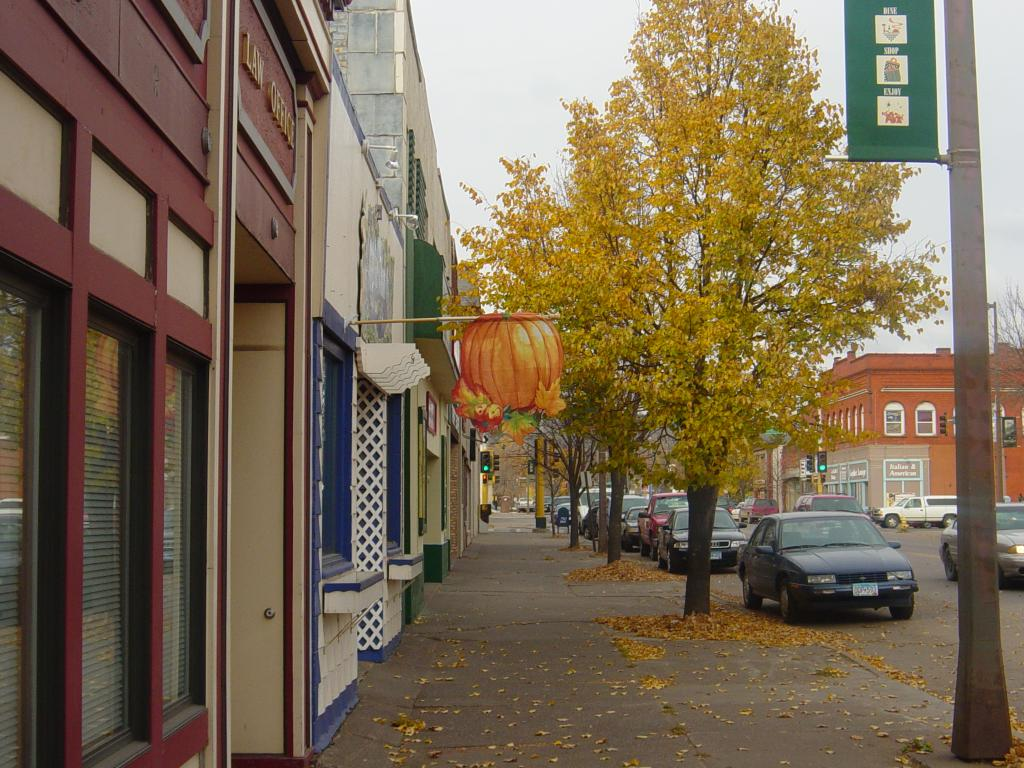
Businesses on Central Avenue

On a map, the core of West Duluth's "downtown" or center of activity roughly forms a triangle, with the sides being Grand Avenue (State Highway 23), Central Avenue, and Bristol Street in Spirit Valley. This area is formed by two building styles, the first old, often joined buildings, usually containing small, locally owned stores on the first floor and apartments on the second (if present), and fronted by broad sidewalks. These occupy much of the Grand and Central Avenue portions.

The other type, enclosed by Grand Avenue, Central Avenue, and facing Bristol Street on both sides, consists of more recent construction resembling suburban sprawl, despite never sprawling, but only replacing older buildings. A strip mall, "Valley Shopping Center", is anchored by a Kmart store. A large sea of asphalt (parking lots and streets) divided by buildings and concrete barriers sits between the mall and other establishments, such as a large Super One supermarket.

Just outside the core is a new urbanist rowhouse development.

West Duluth's Spirit Valley business district is easily accessible from Interstate Highway 35 at Central Avenue.

The Spirit Valley neighborhood, according to the city's official map, follows Grand Avenue between 46th Avenue West and 59th Avenue West; and includes the entire area between Grand Avenue and Mike Colalillo Drive.

== Education ==
West Duluth students attend Stowe Elementary School, Laura MacArthur Elementary School, Lincoln Park Middle School, and Duluth Denfeld High School. The local Catholic school is St. James, grades K–8, affiliated with the parish of the same name.

An exception to this is the Bayview Heights neighborhood, where students attend Proctor's public schools.

== Restoration ==
=== Roads and streets ===
- In 2004, a large section of 59th Avenue West was given new road surface pavement.
- In the summer of 2005, a large portion of Grand Avenue was given new road surface pavement. A stretch from 46th Avenue West to 59th Avenue West was entirely re-paved. The street lane format was altered, new stoplights were put in, new sidewalks were poured, as well as the addition of newer lamp posts.
- In the spring of 2006, construction started on the second phase of Grand Avenue. A section from 40th Avenue West to 46th Avenue West was redone. This project also repaired the sewage lines for several homes in the area.
- In the summer of 2010, a $66 million 3-year project went underway to reconstruct a large section of Interstate Highway 35 in West Duluth. All pavement was torn up and replaced, along with many concrete guardrails. Unused railroad bridges were removed, and many freeway entrance and exit ramps were given new pavement. The Minnesota Department of Transportation referred to the 2010–2012 road construction project in the media as the "Interstate 35 Mega Project" in Duluth.
- In 2014, 57th Avenue West, between Cody Street and Highland Street, was reconstructed with new road surface pavement.

== Spirit Valley Days ==
The Spirit Valley Days festival takes place every August in West Duluth.

Events include:

- Craft show
- Classic car show
- Waterfront Trail Run/Walk
- Miss West Duluth Pageant
- Pancake breakfast
- Music at the Ramsey Square stage
- Spirit Valley Days Parade
- Kids Rides and Games

== See also ==
- Duluth, Minnesota
- Interstate Highway 35
- Interstate Highway 35 in Minnesota
- U.S. Highway 2
- U.S. Highway 2 in Minnesota
- Grand Avenue – State Highway 23
- 40th Avenue West – County Road 91

== External links and references ==
- City of Duluth website
- Duluth Neighborhood map
- Duluth Library locations website
- Duluth Denfeld High School website
- Spirit Valley Days festival – August – website
