= Riverside (Duluth) =

Neighborhood of Duluth, Minnesota

Coordinates: 46°42′36″N 92°12′15″W

Riverside is a neighborhood in Duluth, Minnesota, United States.

Grand Avenue, Riverside Drive, and Spring Street are three of the main routes in the community.

Riverside is located along the banks of the Saint Louis River and Spirit Lake. The Willard Munger Bicycle Trail passes through the neighborhood.

== History ==
The 1918 McDougall Duluth Shipbuilding Company was located there on Spring Street, now the site of the Spirit Lake Marina.

== Adjacent Neighborhoods ==
(Directions following those of Duluth's general street grid system, not actual geographical coordinates)

- Norton Park (north, east)
- Smithville (south)
- City of Proctor (north)

== External links and references ==
- City of Duluth website
- City map of neighborhoods

Specific
