= Carl Rudolf Berghult =

American politician (1905–2000)

Carl Rudolph Berghult
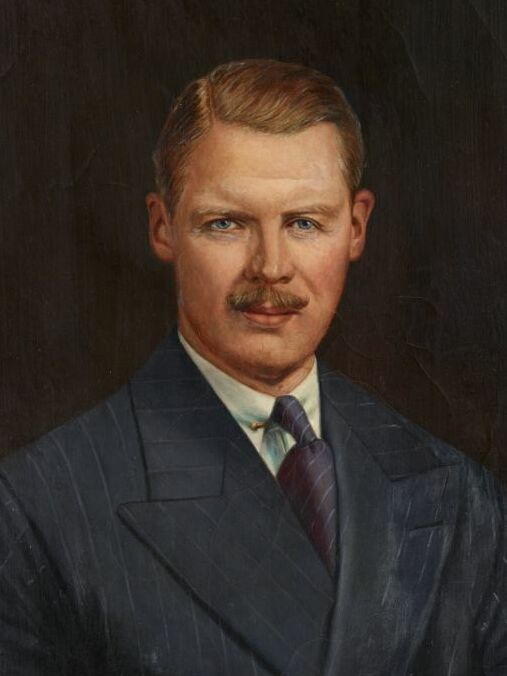
- Berghult in 1941

27th Mayor of Duluth, Minnesota
- In office 1937–1941
- Preceded by: Samuel F. Snively
- Succeeded by: Edward H. Hatch

Personal details
- Born: Carl Rudolf Berghult II; April 15, 1905 Duluth, Minnesota, U.S.
- Died: February 16, 2000 (aged 94) Arlington, Texas, U.S.
- Resting place: Oneota Cemetery, Duluth, Minnesota, U.S.
- Spouse: Eva Louise Drewes
- Children: 2
- Parent(s): Carl Emil Berghult; Ida Mathilda Carlsson
- Education: Denfeld High School; Gustavus Adolphus College
- Profession: Politician

Military service
- Allegiance: United States
- Branch/service: United States Navy
- Rank: Commander

Carl Rudolf "Rudy" Berghult II (April 15, 1905 – February 16, 2000) was an American politician who served as the 26th mayor of Duluth, Minnesota from 1937 to 1941.

== Early life and education ==
Berghult was born in Duluth, Minnesota, on April 15, 1905, to Carl Emil Berghult and Ida Mathilda Carlsson. Both of his parents were immigrants from Sweden who originated from Långasjö and Torsås.

Berghult attended Denfeld High School, graduating in 1923. Following this, he studied faculty at Gustavus Adolphus College.

== Career ==
In 1937, Berghult was elected to serve as the 26th mayor of Duluth, Minnesota until 1941. At the age of 31, Berghult was the youngest mayor of a U.S. city with a population larger than 100,000, as well as the first native-born mayor of Duluth, Minnesota.

Berghult was credited with secured government funding for the Blatnik Bridge and working to beautify the city's public land as mayor, in addition to revising the city's debt structure and beginning several health and work programs for its citizens.

Berghult was preceded by Samuel F. Snively and succeeded by Edward H. Hatch.

Following his tenure as mayor, Berghult joined the United States Navy, earning recognition for his service at Normandy Beach and in Norway. He retired as a commander.

== Personal life and death ==
Berghult resided in Duluth for the entirety of his life. He married Eva Louise Drewes, with whom he had two children.

Berghult died at the age of 94 in Arlington, Texas, on February 16, 2000. Berghult was cremated; his ashes were interred at Oneota Cemetery, located in Duluth.

== See also ==
- List of mayors of Duluth, Minnesota

Political offices
Preceded by Samuel F. Snively	26th Mayor of Duluth, Minnesota; 1937–1941	Succeeded by Edward H. Hatch
