= Kingsbury Creek =

Stream in St. Louis County, Minnesota, U.S.

Coordinates: 46°43′27″N 92°10′54″W

Kingsbury Creek is a stream in St. Louis County, in the U.S. state of Minnesota.

== History ==
Kingsbury Creek is named after William W. Kingsbury, a Minnesota legislator.

== See also ==
- List of rivers of Minnesota
