= Smithville (Duluth) =

Neighborhood of Duluth, Minnesota

Coordinates: 46°42′13″N 92°12′59″W

Smithville is a neighborhood in Duluth, Minnesota, United States. Grand Avenue serves as a main route in the community. Stewart Creek flows through the neighborhood, with the Saint Louis River located nearby.

According to the city's official map, Bardon's Peak on West Skyline Parkway is located within the boundaries of the Smithville neighborhood.

== History ==
Historically, Smithville was the location of Work People's College, a radical labor college launched in 1907 by activists of the Finnish Socialist Federation. This residential school, originally a Finnish religious seminary and general education facility, continued in operation until 1941, during most of which time it was politically close to the syndicalist trade union, the Industrial Workers of the World. The main building was later converted into a residential apartment house.

== Adjacent neighborhoods ==
(Directions following those of Duluth's general street grid system, not actual geographical coordinates)

- Riverside (north)
- Morgan Park (east)
- Gary – New Duluth (south)

== External links and references ==
- City of Duluth website
- City map of neighborhoods (PDF)
