= Clarence R. Magney =

American judge (1883–1962)

Clarence Magney
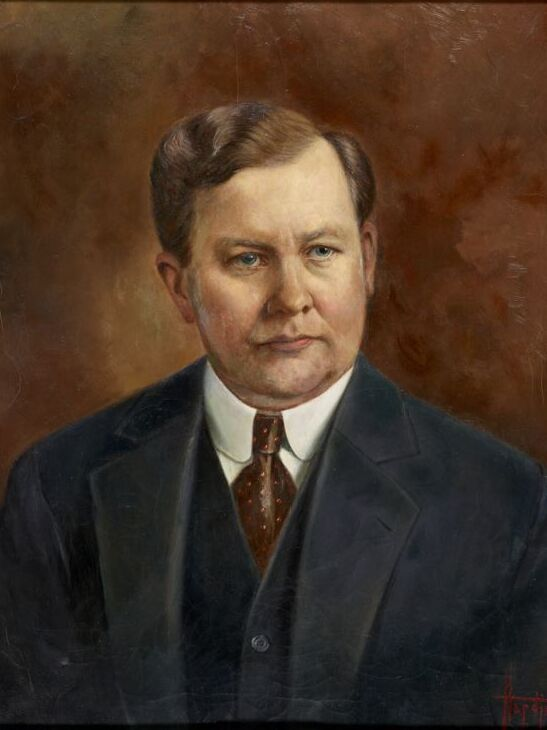
- Magney c. 1920

Associate Justice of the Minnesota Supreme Court
- In office 1943–1953

24th Mayor of Duluth
- In office 1917–1920
- Preceded by: William I. Prince
- Succeeded by: Trevanion W. Hugo

Personal details
- Born: January 11, 1883 Trenton, Pierce County, Wisconsin, U.S.
- Died: May 14, 1962 (aged 79)
- Education: Gustavus Adolphus College (BA); Harvard University (LLB)

Clarence R. Magney (January 11, 1883 – May 13, 1962) was an American attorney, lawyer, and jurist who served as the mayor of Duluth from 1917 to 1920 and associate justice of the Minnesota Supreme Court from 1943 to 1953.

== Early life and education ==
Born in Trenton, Pierce County, Wisconsin, Magney went to public schools in Bayport, Minnesota. He graduated from Gustavus Adolphus College in 1903 and Harvard Law School in 1908.

== Career ==
After graduating from law school, Magney worked as an attorney at Jenswold & Jenswold in Duluth. He was elected mayor of Duluth in 1917 and served until 1920. He was later elected to serve as a district court judge. Magney was appointed as an associate justice of the Minnesota Supreme Court in 1943 and served until 1953. He was instrumental in getting a number of state parks and scenic waysides established along the North Shore of Lake Superior. Judge C. R. Magney State Park is named for him. After retiring as a justice, he continued to work as commissioner of the Minnesota Supreme Court until his death in 1962.

== Personal life ==
His father, Jonas Magney (surname originally Magnuson), immigrated to the United States from Sweden in 1858. He was the first student at Gustavus and upon graduation became ordained as a Lutheran pastor.

== See also ==
- List of mayors of Duluth, Minnesota
