= Duluth Transit Authority =

Public transport agency in the Twin Ports region of Minnesota and Wisconsin

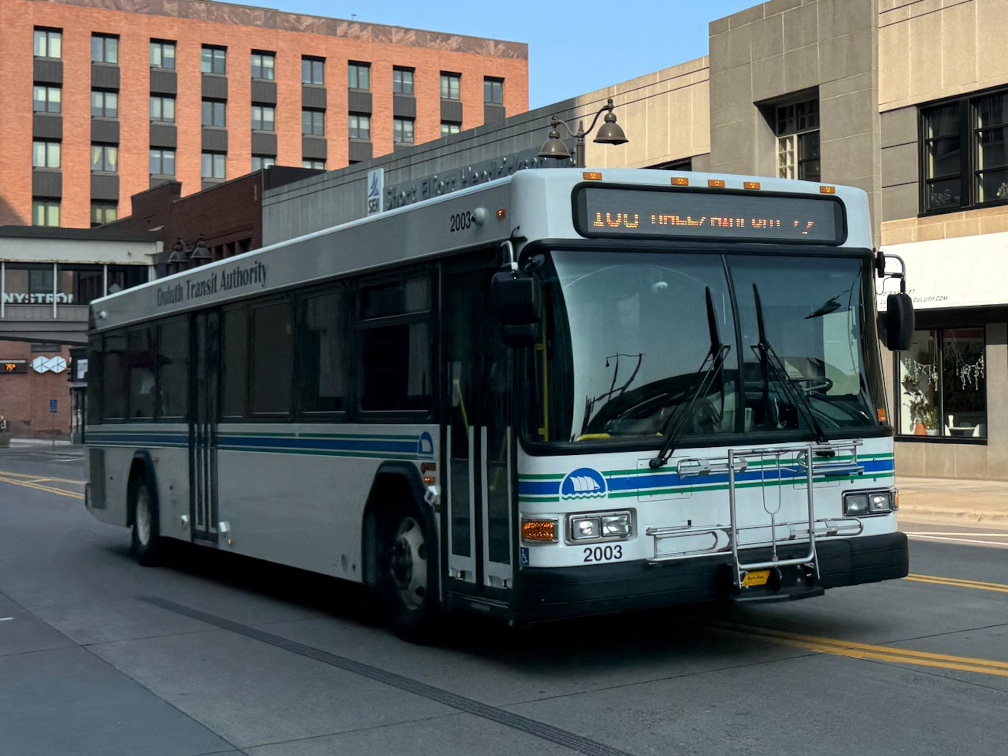
- Duluth Transit Authority bus in downtown Duluth
- Founded: 1969
- Headquarters: 2402 W. Michigan Street
- Service area: Twin Ports region of Minnesota and Wisconsin
- Service type: Transit bus; Bus rapid transit; Paratransit
- Routes: 14
- Annual ridership: 2,308,998 (2024)
- Website: duluthtransit.com

The Duluth Transit Authority (DTA) is the public transit operator in the Twin Ports region of Minnesota and Wisconsin. DTA operates 15 bus routes throughout the region, serving Duluth, Minnesota; Superior, Wisconsin, and their surrounding suburbs. DTA was founded in 1969 by an act of the Minnesota Legislature, and as of 2024, provides over 2.3 million passenger trips per year. In 2009, the DTA was named Transit System of the Year by the Minnesota Public Transit Association.

DTA operates 14 bus routes in the Twin Ports region. Two "GO Line" routes provide frequent, limited-stop service on key corridors, and a shuttle service operates during summers to connect tourist destinations on the Duluth waterfront.

== Routes ==
DTA redesigned its bus network in 2023 under the "Better Bus Blueprint" initiative. Planning began in 2017, and a final draft of the network was unveiled in 2021. Under the Better Bus Blueprint, DTA reallocated resources from its previous network of 33 routes to 14 new routes, with more frequent service on weekdays and expanded weekend service. Implementation of the plan was delayed due to issues in retaining bus drivers, compounded by the effects of the COVID-19 pandemic.

Route	Terminals		Via	Notes
101 Blue Line	Spirit Valley Grand Ave & 59th Ave W	University of Minnesota Duluth Kirby Plaza	Downtown Duluth Duluth Transportation Center	Go Line routes 101 and 102 operate every 15 minutes with limited stops. Uses Gillig BRT Plus rolling stock
102 Green Line	Downtown Duluth Duluth Transportation Center	Hermantown Walmart, Miller Trunk Hwy & Loberg Ave	Duluth Heights Miller Hill Mall	Go Line routes 101 and 102 operate every 15 minutes with limited stops. Uses Gillig BRT Plus rolling stock
1	Downtown Duluth Duluth Transportation Center	DTA Garage	Lincoln Park Superior St	Operates irregular schedule. Passengers who are not DTA Employees must exit before entering DTA Garage.
103	New Duluth Commonwealth Ave & McCuen St	University of Minnesota Duluth Kirby Plaza	Lakeside E Superior St & N 60th Ave E	Express service via I-35 between 6th Ave West and Central Ave
104	Downtown Duluth Duluth Transportation Center	University of Minnesota Duluth Kirby Plaza	E 4th St	30 minute frequencies
105	Downtown Duluth Duluth Transportation Center	University of Minnesota Duluth Kirby Plaza	E 9th St	30 minute frequencies
106	Downtown Duluth Duluth Transportation Center	University of Minnesota Duluth Kirby Plaza	College of St. Scholastica	
107	Downtown Duluth Duluth Transportation Center	Duluth Heights Miller Hill Mall	Lake Superior College	
108	Downtown Duluth Duluth Transportation Center	Duluth International Airport	Duluth Heights Miller Hill Mall	
109	Downtown Duluth Duluth Transportation Center	Proctor N 2nd Ave & 5th St	Oneota	Express service via I-35
110	Downtown Duluth Duluth Transportation Center	Superior, Wisconsin Walmart, Tower Ave & N 37th St	Rice’s Point, Duluth Garfield Ave John A. Blatnik Bridge	30 minute frequency
111	Superior, Wisconsin Tower Ave & Broadway St	Itasca, Wisconsin US-53 & 50th Ave E	University of Wisconsin–Superior	
112	Hermantown Miller Trunk Hwy & Burning Tree Rd	Woodland Woodland Park & Ride	College of St. Scholastica, University of Minnesota Duluth	
113	Downtown Duluth Duluth Transportation Center	Park Point Park Point Recreation Area		Terminus at Park Point beach during summer months
114	Downtown Duluth Duluth Transportation Center	Central Hillside Skyline Blvd & 8th Ave W		
Port Town Trolley	Downtown Duluth Duluth Transportation Center	Downtown Duluth Lake Superior Maritime Visitor Center	SS William A. Irvin, Duluth Entertainment Convention Center, Great Lakes Aquarium	Operates seasonally from the first Sunday in June to Labor Day

== Duluth Transportation Center ==
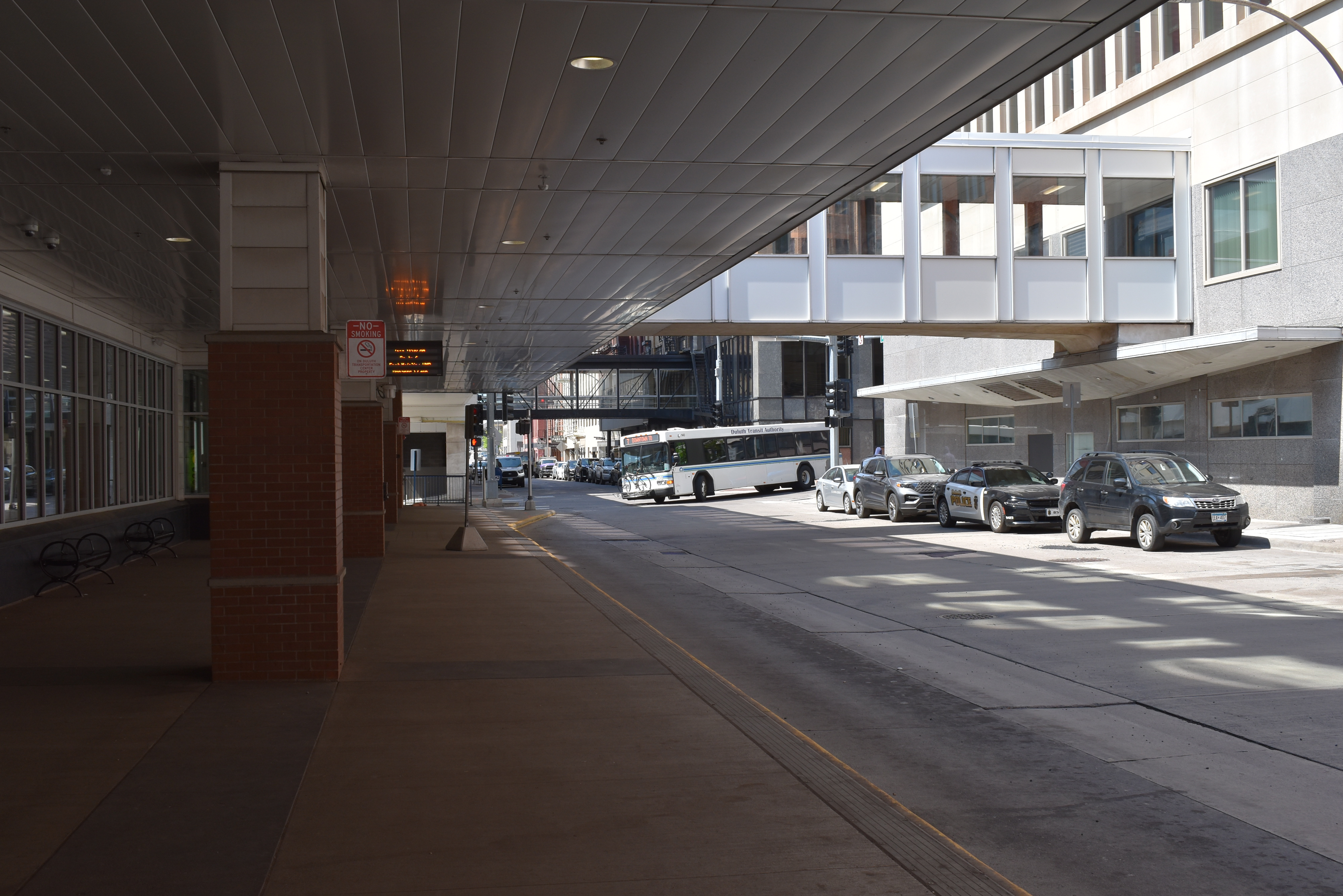
Duluth Transportation Center in 2023

Duluth Transportation Center (DTC) is the downtown hub for the Duluth transit system.

The DTC was built in February 2016, replacing an existing parking ramp. The building was designed by LHB Corporation and constructed by Mortenson Construction.

The DTC has eight docks for boarding buses, with space for layovers. Skyways to nearby buildings were replaced during construction, improving pedestrian access.

== Incidents ==
On September 10, 2021, a 36-year-old bus driver fatally struck a 64-year-old pedestrian near the Miller Hill Mall. She was charged with criminal vehicular homicide; prosecutors alleged she was distracted when she struck the pedestrian.

== Ridership ==
Duluth Transit Authority is the Minnesota's third-largest transit system by ridership, after the Metro Transit and University of Minnesota Campus Shuttle systems in Minneapolis–Saint Paul.

Year	Fixed route ridership	Change over previous year
2014	3,100,305	▼2.96%
2015	3,051,665	▼1.57%
2016	2,804,354	▼8.1%
2017	2,786,702	▼0.63%
2018	2,760,475	▼0.94%
2019	2,645,307	▼4.17%
2020	1,794,627	▼32.16%
2021	1,461,418	▼18.57%
2022	1,874,795	▲28.29%
2023	2,134,071	▲13.83%
2024	2,308,998	▲8.2%

== STRIDE ==
The DTA operates an ADA paratransit service under the brand name STRIDE (Special Transit RIDE) for passengers with disabilities.

STRIDE does not have any fixed routes, it is a point-to-point service that must be scheduled in advance. It is only available to passengers eligible under the ADA.

STRIDE fares are double the standard fixed-route fare. Charging $1.50 during off peak times and $3.00 on peak.

STRIDE utilizes shorter buses equipped with wheelchair ramps or lifts.

== Fleet ==
The DTA operates a fleet consisting of Gillig Low Floor 40-foot transit buses (which comprises the majority of the fleet), Gillig BRT Plus (Only used on Blue and Green lines), and Gillig Trolley Replicas (primarily used for seasonal service)

== See also ==
- List of bus transit systems in the United States
