= Duluth Heights =

Human settlement area of Duluth, Minnesota

Coordinates: 46°48′03″N 92°07′55″W

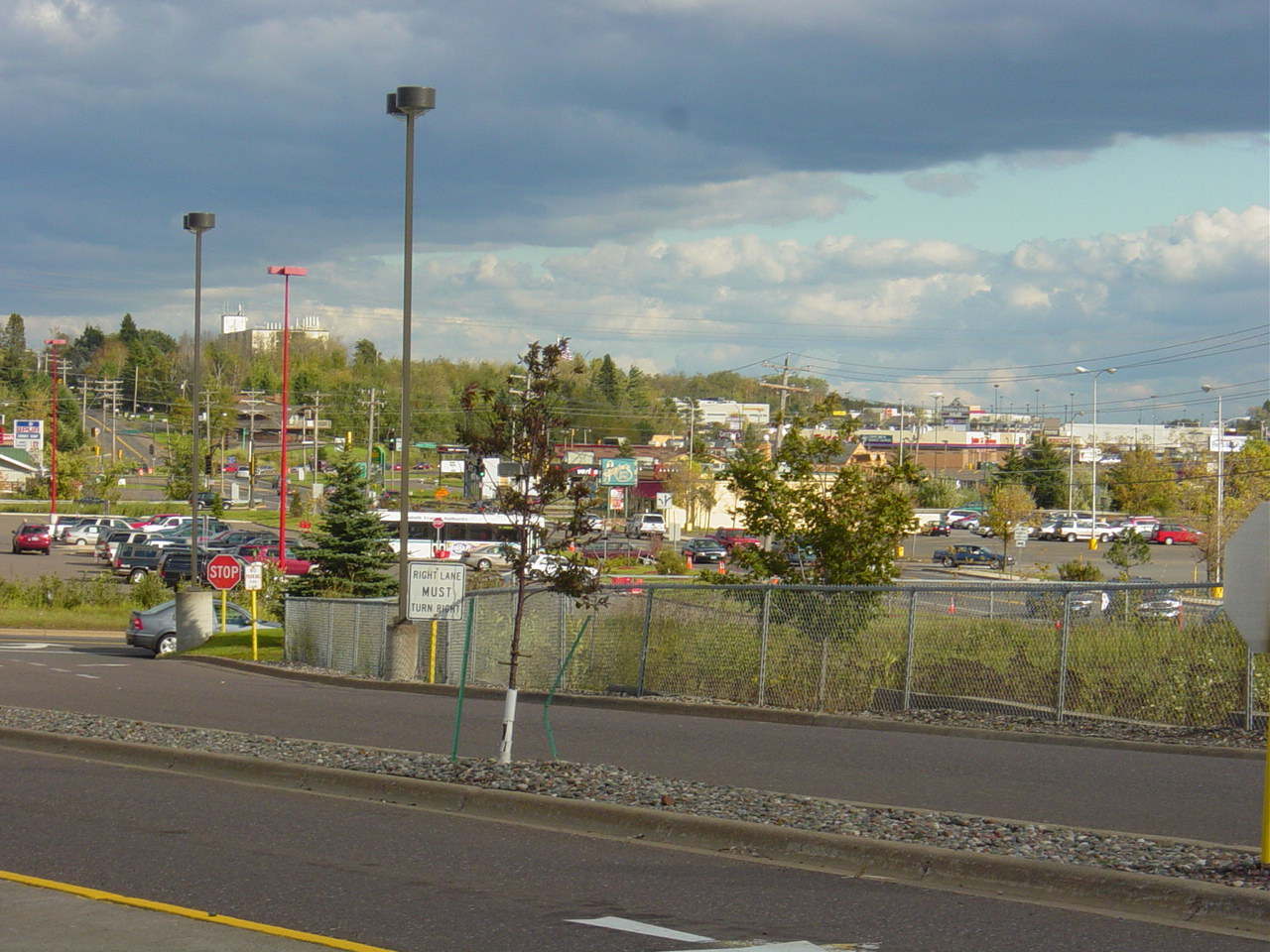
A great amount of development has taken place in the area surrounding the Miller Hill Mall in the past few decades

Duluth Heights is one of the largest neighborhoods (in terms of area) in the city of Duluth, Minnesota, United States.

Central Entrance, Arlington Avenue, and Arrowhead Road are three of the main routes in Duluth Heights.

Miller Creek, Coffee Creek, Buckingham Creek, and the West Branch of Chester Creek, all flow through the Duluth Heights neighborhood.

According to the city's official map, the Duluth International Airport, the Miller Hill shopping area, and the Enger Park Golf Course are all located within the boundaries of the Duluth Heights neighborhood.

== History ==
Duluth Heights was primarily undeveloped and rural before the 1970s, but the arrival of the Miller Hill Mall in 1973 brought a large number of businesses both in the building and outside, some migrating from the city's old Downtown district, forming the U.S. Highway 53 or Miller Trunk corridor. The area is more suburban in appearance than many other areas in Duluth.

== Adjacent Neighborhoods ==
- Kenwood (east)
- Piedmont Heights (southwest)
- City of Hermantown (west)
- City of Rice Lake (north)
- Central Hillside (south)

== See also ==
- U.S. Highway 53

== External links and references ==
- City of Duluth website
- City map of neighborhoods (PDF)
- Miller Hill Mall website
