= Buckingham Creek (St. Louis River tributary) =

Stream in St. Louis County, Minnesota, U.S.

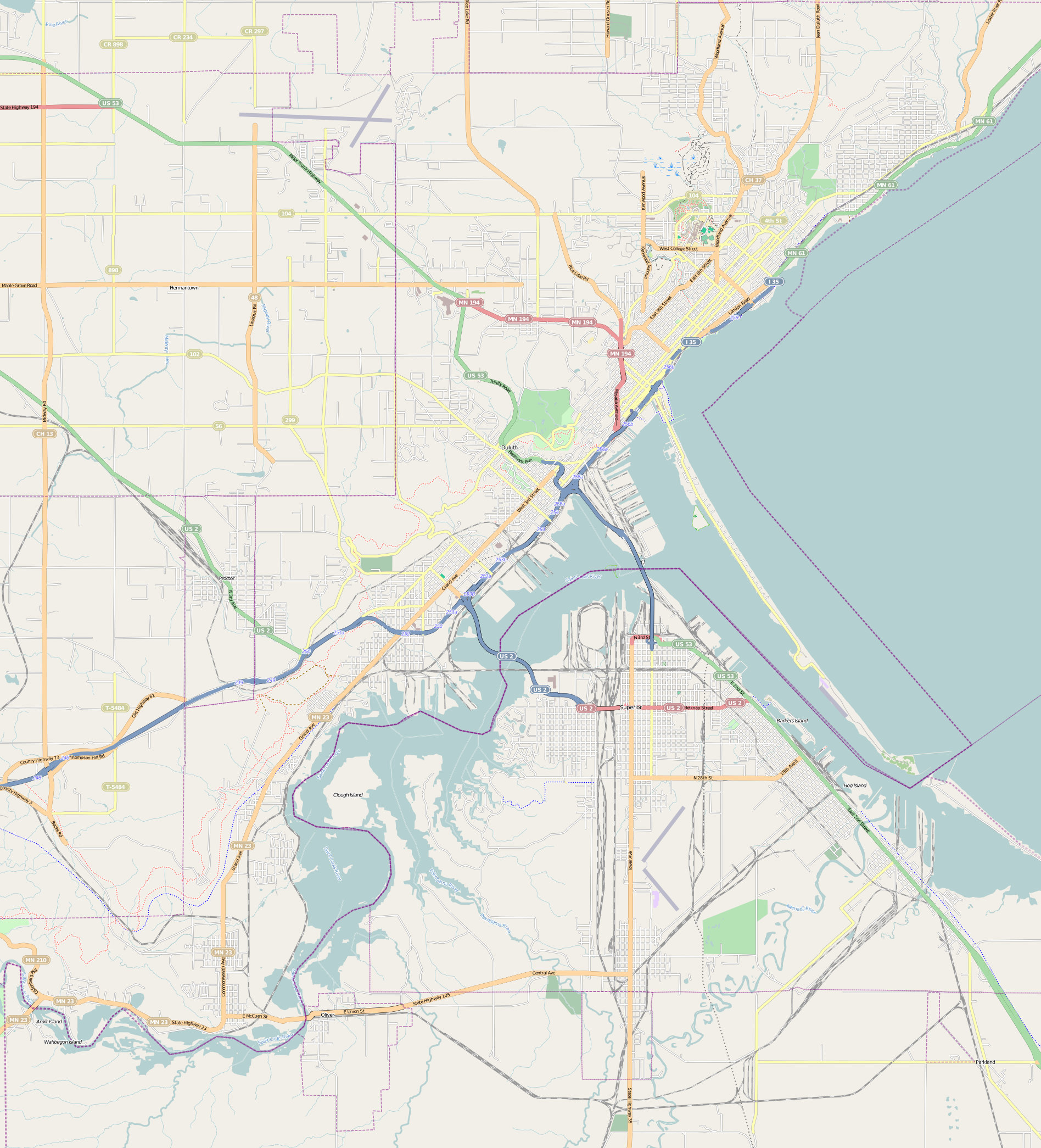
- Mouth of Buckingham Creek

Location
- Country: United States
- State: Minnesota
- County: St. Louis
- City: Duluth

Physical characteristics
- Source
  - location: Duluth Heights
  - coordinates: 46.7933°N 92.1337°W
- Mouth
  - location: Duluth Harbor Basin (Saint Louis River)
  - coordinates: 46.7726°N 92.1096°W
- Length: 1.9 mi-long (3.1 km)
- Basin size: 1.1 square miles (2.8 km^{2})

Buckingham Creek is a stream in the city of Duluth, St. Louis County, in the U.S. state of Minnesota. The creek is a tributary of the St. Louis River. The St. Louis River then empties into Lake Superior.

It has the coldest water of 16 trout streams in Duluth. Through a collaboration between the city of Duluth, the South St. Louis Soil & Water Conservation District, the Minnesota Pollution Control Agency, and the Minnesota Department of Natural Resources, the stream underwent a restoration project that was completed in October 2024, which restored more than 3,000 feet of channel through the Enger Park Golf Course.

== Geography ==
Buckingham Creek spans 1.9 miles (3.06 km), beginning in the Duluth Heights neighborhood. Its path takes it through Enger Park Golf Course and the Observation Hill area of Central Hillside, then into a culvert near 12th Avenue West and First Street, and ultimately empties into the St. Louis River estuary between downtown and Lincoln Park.

== History ==
=== Name ===
It is named for surveyor F.A. Buckingham, an early settler of the area, who built a claim shanty on the western bank of the creek where it crossed Superior Street. Mr. Buckingham was appointed one of the first councilman and trustees of the nearby town (now neighborhood) of Oneota incorporated by an act of territorial legislature in 1857.

=== Twin Ponds ===
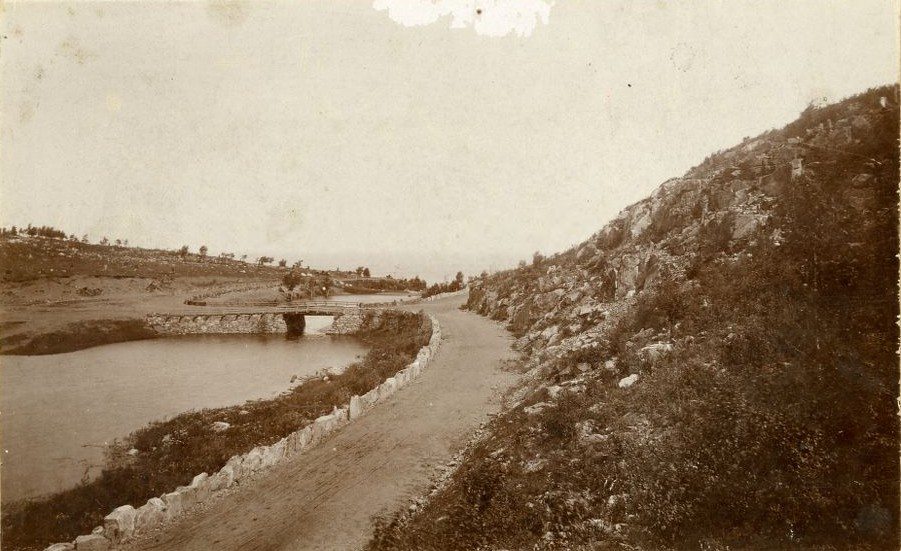
View of boulevard bridge separating the upper and lower ponds ca. 1893

In the 1890s, developers dammed Buckingham Creek downstream from the golf course, creating two small reservoirs known as "Gem Lakes." Today, these water bodies are called the Twin Ponds. In their early days, they served as a scenic picnic spot for those enjoying horse-and-carriage rides along Rogers Boulevard, now known as Skyline Parkway. Today, the Twin Ponds offer recreational opportunities such as fishing and swimming, and they also serve as a gateway to some regional trails. From the southeast shore of the lower pond, visitors can access the foot-traffic-only Superior Hiking Trail which leads to Enger Tower. Near the parking area and the upper pond, hikers and mountain bikers can connect to the multi-use Duluth Traverse trail.

The upper pond is a designated trout lake, stocked with rainbow trout since 1932, making it a popular spot for anglers. It's relatively small, covering 1.7 acres with a maximum depth of 9 feet. The lower pond is even smaller, with an area of 0.52 acres and a maximum depth of 5 feet. While the water quality in the ponds is generally suitable for recreation, it's important to note that the surrounding park area has faced challenges due to public disinvestment, which may affect the overall experience.

=== "Little Italy" or "The Glenn" ===
In the late 19th and early 20th centuries, an Italian-American community known as "Little Italy" or "The Glenn" thrived in the area around 12th Avenue West in Duluth. This neighborhood, characterized by its steep slopes and proximity to Buckingham Creek, was home to many immigrant families who played a significant role in the city's development. The name "The Glenn" likely originated from the area's topography, with "glen" meaning a valley bounded by steep slopes. This name later inspired the Glen Place Apartments built in the area during the 1970s.

== See also ==
- List of rivers of Minnesota
