= List of Great Lakes museum and historic ships =

This is a list of Great Lakes museum and historic ships, including surviving hulls, museum or historic ships at risk, other surviving historic hulls and notable partial ships.

== Museum ships and boats, surviving hulls ==
=== Lakers: bulk carriers ===
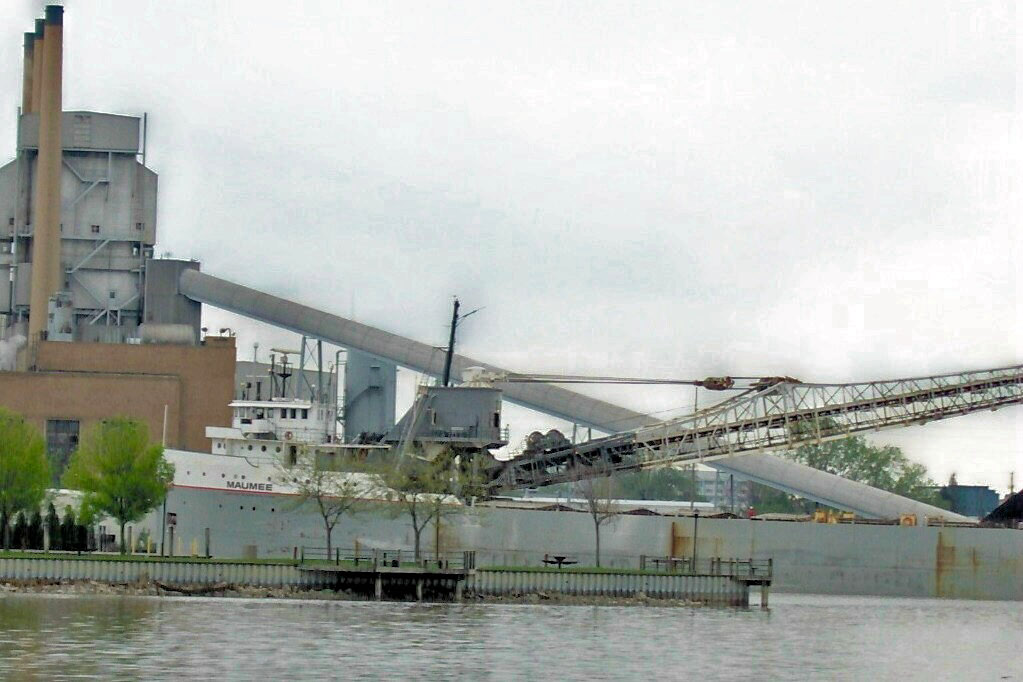
MV Maumee, used to be one of the oldest active bulk freighters on the Lakes, until she was scrapped in 2012. Here she is, unloading in Holland, Michigan

Lake freighters, or lakers, are bulk carrier vessels which ply the Great Lakes. The best-known variety is the oreboat, depicted in songs from Gordon Lightfoot, Stan Rogers and others. Some classic-design lakers still operate, including a few with steam engines.

==== SS Col. James M Schoonmaker (Toledo, Ohio) ====
Col. James M. Schoonmaker sailed from 1911 to 1980. She was first owned by the Shenango Furnace Company under her present name and was sold to the Cleveland-Cliffs Iron Company, which renamed her Willis B. Boyer. Col. James M. Schoonmaker was the largest bulk freighter in the world when commissioned. In an ambitious restoration, Col James M. Schoonmaker was re-christened with its original name July 1, 2011, on the 100th anniversary of the ship's launching in Toledo, Ohio. In October 2012, she was moved with great fanfare from her longtime berth at International Park in Toledo downriver to a site next to the new home of the National Museum of the Great Lakes. Ship and museum which opened to the public in Spring 2014.

==== SS William G Mather (Cleveland, Ohio) ====
SS William G. Mather was a laker built in 1925 and a former flagship for the Cleveland-Cliffs Iron Company. It is now a maritime museum, open to the public, in Cleveland's North Coast Harbor.

==== SS William A Irvin (Duluth, Minnesota) ====
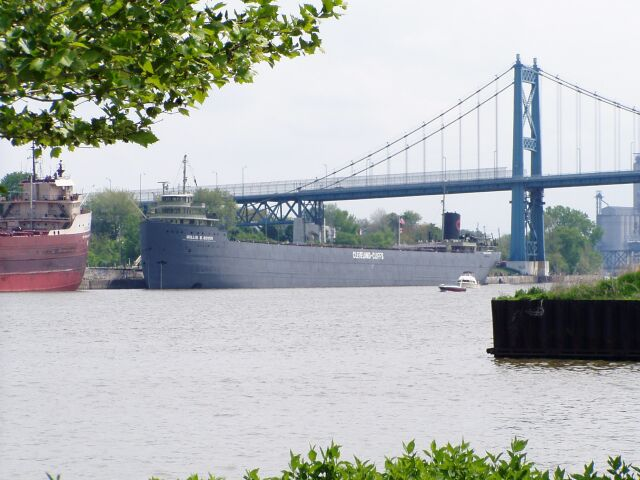
Willis B. Boyer (now Col. James M Schoonmaker) and Buckeye in the Maumee River, Toledo; Buckeye currently sails as the barge Lewis J. Kuber

William A. Irvin was named for the president of U.S. Steel at the time of its launching. It was the first laker with a welded design, and served as the flagship of US Steel's Great Lakes fleet from her launch in 1938 until 1975. It is open for tours at the Great Lakes Floating Maritime Museum in Duluth.

==== SS Meteor (1896—Superior, Wisconsin) ====
Meteor is the last surviving ship using whaleback design; she is a museum in Superior, home of the American Steel Barge Company (where 33 out of the 44 total whalebacks were built starting in 1891).

==== SS Valley Camp (Sault Ste. Marie, Michigan) ====
Valley Camp was a typical oreboat, who served the National Steel Corporation, Republic Steel Corporation and Wilson Transit Co. during her 1917–1966 working life. In 1968, she became a museum ship on the waterfront of Sault Ste. Marie, downstream of the Soo Locks. She holds many relics from SS Edmund Fitzgerald (including two of Edmund Fitzgerald's mauled lifeboats).

=== Passenger-freight steamers ===
==== SS Keewatin (Kingston, Ontario) ====
SS Keewatin is a former Canadian Pacific passenger liner. Built in Scotland in 1907, the boat steamed between Fort William and Port McNicoll for over 50 years until she was sold for scrap in 1967. Saved from the wrecker's torch, Keewatin was towed to Saugatuck, Michigan for use as a museum in 1968. She is the last unmodified Great Lakes passenger liner in existence, and an example of Edwardian luxury. Keewatin is one of the world's last coal-fired steamships. A June 24, 2007 Toronto Star article documented a Canadian effort to see the steamer returned to Dominion waters as a museum ship at Port McNicoll. The effort to repatriate "The Kee" bore fruit on June 23, 2012 (100 years to the day after she first entered Port McNicoll), when the ship returned to her former berth before a crowd of thousands.

==== SS Milwaukee Clipper (Muskegon, Michigan) ====
SS Milwaukee Clipper, another passenger steamer. The Clipper is the last Great Lakes American Passenger Ship of her kind. The SD Milwaukee Clipper was built in 1904 as the SS Juniata, She carried 350 passengers and cargo between Buffalo, NY, and Duluth, MN from 1905 through 1936, when she was tied up with an uncertain future. In 1940, the SS Juniata was purchased and was sent to Manitowoc Shipbuilding Co, to be rebuilt with an all-steel superstructure. She was christened as the SS Milwaukee Clipper in 1941, and carried 900 passengers and 120 automobiles between Muskegon, MI, and Milwaukee, WI. The run lasted until 1970 when she was pulled out of service. After 1970 the ship was saved as an attraction in Chicago. Later, she was moved to Hammond, IN, where the ship was going to be used as a casino. The Clipper was named a National Historic Landmark in 1989. The Clipper was brought back to Muskegon MI, in 1997 to be used as a museum and banquet/convention center where she sits today. The Clipper retains the last American-Built Quadruple Expansion Steam Engine.

=== Passenger and excursion steamers ===
==== SS Columbia (Detroit, Michigan) ====
SS Columbia is a former Boblo Island excursion boat, built in 1902, which has been in storage since 1991. A New York City group intends to save Columbia and use it on the Hudson River, like the old Hudson day steamers (all of which have been lost).

==== SS Ste Claire (Detroit) ====
Ste. Claire, a former Boblo Island excursion boat, was built in 1910. Like her Bob-Lo Amusement Park running mate Columbia, she was designed by Frank Kirby. In July, 2018 an apparently accidental fire destroyed most of her remaining wooden superstructure. She is undergoing an extensive rebuild and is expected to be finished by 2025.

=== Railroad and auto ferries ===
==== SS City of Milwaukee (Manistee, Michigan) ====
SS City of Milwaukee was a railroad ferry of the Grand Trunk Milwaukee Car Ferry Company which was built in 1931 to replace a previous ferry (SS Milwaukee, lost in 1929 with all hands). She sailed for the company for 40 years (and another five for the Ann Arbor Railroad) before laying up in Frankfort in 1982, where she remained until being sold as a museum. Later moved to her present berth in Manistee, she is open for tours as the last unmodified, classic railroad ferry.

==== Trillium (Toronto, Ontario) ====
The side-wheel steam ferry Trillium (1910), reactivated in 1976, calls Toronto home. Several vintage 1930s screw ferries serve alongside her.

=== Tugboats and workboats ===
Their small size and hardy construction make tugboats a favorite as museum ships. Their smaller size means lower maintenance costs (and maintenance can often be performed by volunteer crews). Three steam tugs survive, in addition to three former Army tugs later used for other purposes.

==== Steam tug Edna G (Two Harbors, Minnesota) ====
The steam tugboat Edna G is in retirement as a floating display. Built in 1896, it was one of the last operating steam tugboats on the Great Lakes and is on the National Register of Historic Places.

==== Steam tug Ned Hanlan (Toronto) ====
The steam tug Ned Hanlan has been preserved ashore as a static display on the grounds of the Canadian National Exhibition. Launched in 1932, the tug is one of three preserved Great Lakes steam tugs (the others are James Whalen and Edna G). It was named for the rower Ned Hanlan.

==== United States Army tug LT-5 (Oswego, New York) ====
The former World War II United States Army tugboat Major Elisha K. Henson, built in 1943, participated in the Normandy landings. An operational floating display, it worked as a commercial tug (Nash) for 30 years.

==== United States Army Corps tug Bayfield (Duluth, Minnesota) ====
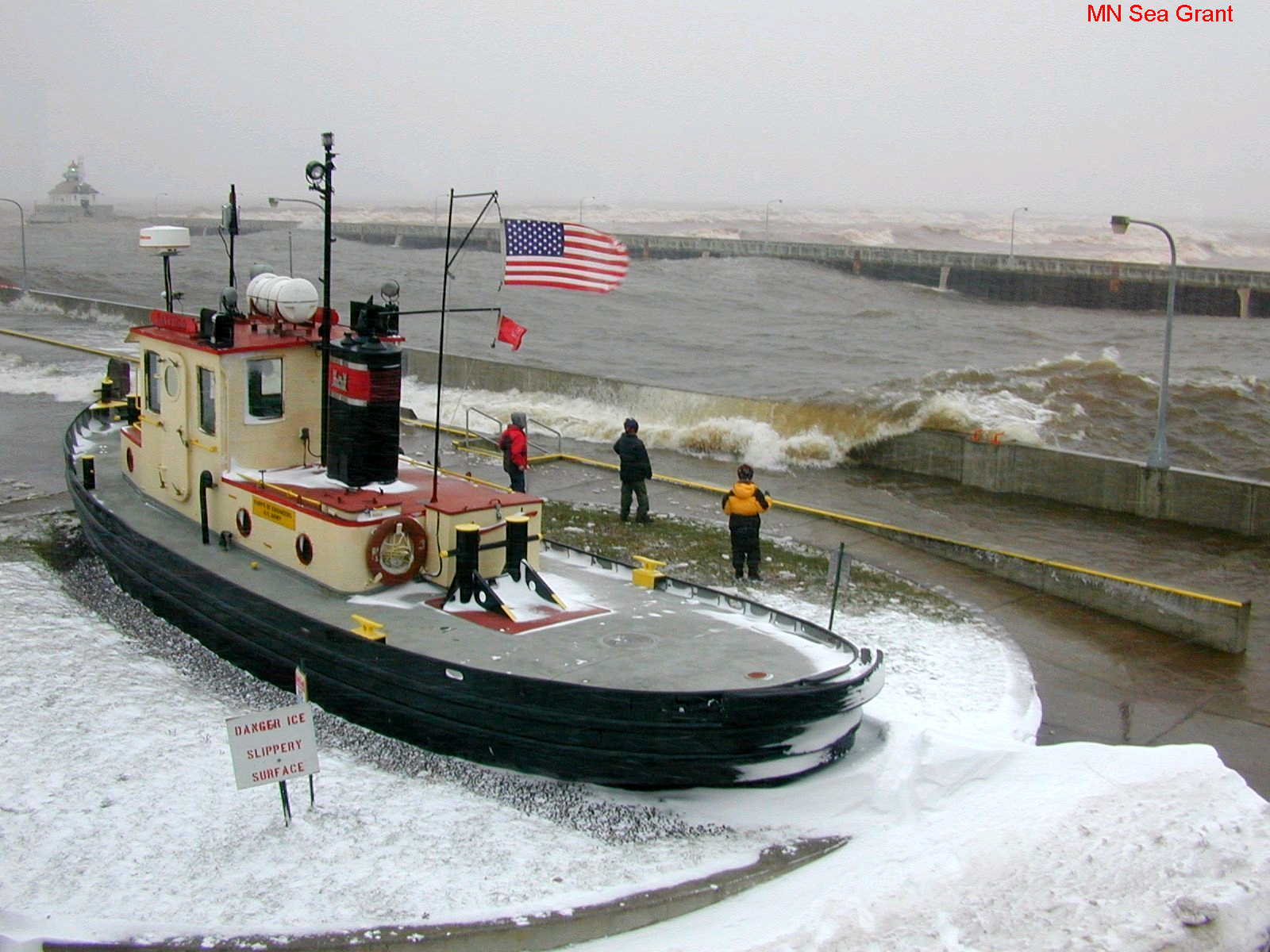
Army Corps tug Bayfield in Duluth

A United States Army Corps of Engineers tugboat, Bayfield, serves as a popular photo shoot at Duluth's Canal Park, Lake Superior Maritime Visitor Center.

==== United States Army Corps Tug Ludington (Kewaunee, Wisconsin) ====
The former United States Army Corps of Engineers tugboat Tug Ludington, built as an Army tug in 1943, also partook in the D-Day invasion at Normandy. A non-operational floating display, it is supervised by ex-Major Wilbur Browder.

==== Tug John Purves (Sturgeon Bay, Wisconsin) ====
The 1919 tug Butterfield was built for World War I, but was sold for the Lake Superior pulpwood trade. During World War II, the boat was taken into government service as the USAT Butterfield, LT-145, serving in the Gulf of Alaska and the Bering Sea. The Roen Steamship Company acquired the tug, renaming it John Purves (after the firm's general manager) and using it as a salvage vessel. It was later donated to the Door County Maritime Museum.

==== Tug Ohio (Toledo, Ohio) ====
Great Lakes Towing Company tug Ohio was built in 1903 as MFDS No.15 it operated as MFDS No.15 until it was retired in 1948 and sold to Great Lakes Towing, who then renamed her Lauren C Turner. She was renamed to Ohio in 1973 she would operate until 2015 when she was taken out of service. In 2018 she was towed from Cleveland to Toledo, where she was converted into a museum ship at the National Museum of The Great Lakes.

==== Tug Ancaster (Owen Sound, Ontario) ====
The Small warping tug Ancaster was built in 1951 operating under 3 owners and sinking once in 1979 but was raised in 1982 serving until 1991 when she became a permanent display at the Owen Sound Marine & Rail Museum she is famous in Canada for appearing on the back of the 1 dollar bill.

==== Tug Oconto (Burns Harbor, Indiana) ====
Built for the US army in 1953 as the ST-2162 she would transferred to the US Army Corps of Engineers and renamed Oconto and would serve with the Army for many years and would serve at the port of Burns Harbor for a few years before being brought on land to be a permanent display.

==== Tug Wilhem Baum (South Haven, Michigan) ====
Built in 1923 as the Capitan A Canfield for the US Army Corps of engineers serving with them until 1961. In 1965 she was bought by the King Company and renamed Julie Dee and then sold again to Beacon Contracting in 2003. She was retired and donated to the Michigan Maritime museum but sank at her dock in 2014. She was raised in 2016 and restored. She is now out of the water as a permanent display.

=== Naval ships ===
The Great Lakes are home to a large number of naval craft serving as museums (including five submarines, two destroyers and a cruiser). Three former army tugs are museums, having come to the lakes in commercial roles.

==== USS Cobia (Manitowoc, Wisconsin) ====
The World War II submarine USS Cobia is operated by the Wisconsin Maritime Museum, and is a good example of submarine restoration. It features the oldest radar set in the world.

==== USS Cod (Cleveland, Ohio) ====
USS Cod (SS-224) is a World War II Gato-class submarine which was brought to Cleveland, Ohio in 1959 as a training platform for Navy Reservists. Cod is a National Historic Landmark, also a memorial to the 3,900 submariners lost in their nation's service during the century of the US Navy's Submarine Force. She was awarded seven battle stars for wartime service. Cod is the only World War II Fleet submarine that is still intact and in her wartime configuration. Cod has been a museum ship in Cleveland's North Coast Harbor since 1 May 1976.

==== USS Croaker (Buffalo, NY) ====
The World War II submarine USS Croaker was brought to Buffalo in 1988, where it serves alongside USS The Sullivans and USS Little Rock. It was modernized in 1953 as a hunter-killer submarine during the Cold War, and resides at the Buffalo Naval and Military Park.

USS Edson (DD-946) is a Forrest Sherman-class destroyer and currently a museum ship in Bay City, Michigan.

==== HMCS Haida (Hamilton, Ontario) ====
The destroyer HMCS Haida is one of two surviving Canadian World War II warships.

==== USS Little Rock (Buffalo) ====
A Cold-War-era cruiser, USS Little Rock is one of three cruisers preserved as museum ships in the US. It resides at the Buffalo Naval and Military Park.

==== LST-393 (Muskegon, Michigan) ====
LST-393, a World War II tank landing ship launched in 1943, is available for tours at West Michigan Dock and Market in Muskegon. With the camouflage paint she wore at the end of the war, the ship worked as an automobile ferry between 1947 and 1973 as MV Highway 16 (after US Route 16, which was bridged by the ship between Muskegon and Milwaukee, Wisconsin). It was awarded three battle stars for war service.

==== HMCS Ojibwa "S72" (Port Burwell, Ontario) ====
S72 HMCS Ojibwa S72 was an Oberon-class submarine, laid down as HMS Onyx at Chatham Dockyard in Chatham, Kent, UK. It was purchased by Canada in 1962 and commissioned into the Canadian navy in 1965, served primarily in the Maritime Forces Atlantic until its decommissioning in 1998.

==== USS Silversides (Muskegon) ====
The World War II submarine USS Silversides was displayed at Chicago's Navy Pier. It moved to Muskegon in 1987.

==== USS The Sullivans (Buffalo) ====
The World War II Fletcher-class destroyer USS The Sullivans was named for five brothers killed in the line of duty. It earned nine battle stars in World War II and two for Korean War service. It resides at the Buffalo Naval and Military Park.

==== U-boat U-505 (Chicago, Illinois) ====
The German submarine U-505 was captured during World War II, allowing the Allies to capture its code books and the German Enigma code machine. Slated for sinking after the war for gunnery practice, the sub was instead donated to Chicago's Museum of Science and Industry. It was later moved inside to a climate-controlled environment (undergoing an extensive restoration), and was re-opened to the public in 2005.

=== Large government vessels ===
==== USCGC Acacia (Manistee, Michigan) ====
USCGC Acacia is a retired buoy tender with icebreaking capabilities serving as a museum ship moored near the railroad car ferry, SS City of Milwaukee. The World War II-vintage vessel is a tribute to the black-painted workhorses of the United States Coast Guard. A ribbon-cutting (announcing the ship's new role as a museum ship) was celebrated in Manistee on August 13, 2011.

==== BFD Edward M Cotter (Buffalo) ====
This 1900 Buffalo Fire Department fireboat, still in use for firefighting and icebreaking, is a National Historic Landmark.

==== MS Georgian Queen (Penetanguishene, Ontario) ====
Georgian Queen is a former Canadian Coast Guard icebreaking cutter which has been converted into a tour boat.

==== CCG Alexander Henry (Thunder Bay, Ontario) ====
Former Canadian Coast Guard icebreaker CCGS Alexander Henry resides at the Marine Museum of the Great Lakes as a display and a bed-and-breakfast. Launched in 1958, she and the former USCGC Mackinaw serve as the Great Lakes' two surviving large red-hulled icebreakers.

==== USCGC Mackinaw (Mackinaw City, Michigan) ====
USCGC Mackinaw (WAGB-83) is a 290-foot (88 m) vessel designed for icebreaking duties on the Great Lakes. Mackinaw was home-ported in Cheboygan, Michigan during its active service. Due to Mackinaw's age and expensive upkeep, the cutter was decommissioned and replaced with a smaller multipurpose cutter (USCGC Mackinaw (WLBB-30), which was commissioned in Cheboygan the same day). The old Mackinaw moved under its own power on June 21, 2006 from the port of its decommissioning to a permanent berth (at the SS Chief Wawatam dock) at the ship's namesake port, Mackinaw City, Michigan, where she now serves as the Icebreaker Mackinaw Maritime Museum.

==== Lightship Huron (Port Huron, Michigan) ====
Located ashore at the head of the St Clair River in Port Huron, US Light Ship Huron (LV-103) is the Great Lakes' only surviving lightvessel.

== At-risk vessel ==
The following historic museum ship did face an uncertain future:

=== MS Norgoma (Sault Ste. Marie, Ontario) ===
MS Norgoma, berthed in the Sault Ste. Marie, Ontario, was built as a steamer carrying freight and passengers in 1950. She ran from Owen Sound to Sault Ste. Marie from 1950 to 1963 on the "Turkey Trail". She became a museum ship in 1977. The city evicted her in 2019 and she now resides at a Canadian scrapyard above the locks, with the city wanting her scrapped.

== Surviving partial ships ==
- SS Ridgetown was partially sunk as a breakwater (with stack and cabins intact) near Toronto, at Port Credit. Built in 1905 as SS William E. Corey, it is one of the oldest surviving hulls on the lake. There are only few ships older, such as the J. B. Ford. Its silhouette is an example of the appearance of early-1900s bulk carriers.
- MV Benson Ford was named after Henry Ford's grandson, and was the 1924 flagship of the Ford Motor Company. The forward cabin and pilothouse is located on South Bass Island, Ohio, near the village of Put-in-Bay, Ohio a private summer residence owned by Bryan Kasper of Sandusky, Ohio. It has been featured in magazines and on television shows, such as HGTV's Extreme Homes, MTV Cribs and the Travel Channel's Extreme Vacation Homes. The pagoda-style cabin of the Ford provides a glimpse of what one of the largest freighters on the lakes looked like.
- The steamer Lewis G Harriman's bow and bow superstructure are preserved in Detour, Michigan. Lewis G Harriman (launched as the purpose-built cement steamer John W Boardman) was scrapped, but the bow was saved as a residence. It was restored in the Boardman's colors.
- The pilot house of SS William Clay Ford is part of the Dossin Great Lakes Museum on Belle Isle, Detroit. The bulk freighter was built in 1952 and scrapped in 1987.
- The past warship, converted into a Great Lakes freighter, SS Joseph H. Thompson's pilot house was removed when being converted to a barge.
- The hull of the freighter Sewell Avery is being used as a dock in Sault Ste Marie by Purvis Marine.
- SS Amasa Stone was partially sunk as a breakwater at Charlevoix, Michigan. She was built in 1905, and she is one of the oldest surviving hulls on the Great Lakes. Before sinking everything was removed from the ship including the Superstructure.
- The pilothouse of the Charles S. Hebard is preserved in Superior, Wisconsin as a hotel gift shop. Her hull is also being used as a breakwater along with Amasa Stone in Charlevoix.
- SS William Edenborn was a 497 ft (151 m) long Great Lakes bulk freighter that was built in 1900 and she was given the title Queen of the Lakes due to her length. She sailed from 1900, to 1962 when she was sunk as a breakwater at Cleveland, Ohio, at Gordon Park, where she was buried under 39 feet of dredgings from the Cuyahoga River. Along with the Edenborn, the bulk freighter James J. Hill was also sunk as breakwater for the same park.
- SS Howard L. Shaw was a 451 ft (137 m) long Lake freighter that was built in 1900 by the Detroit Shipbuilding Company of Wyandotte, Michigan, for the Eddy-Shaw Transit Company of Bay City, Michigan. She was sunk on July 4, 1960 in Ontario Place where she remains to this day.
- The hull of the E. W. Oglebay still survives as part of the dock at Drummond Island.
- The stern section of the package freighter Kearsarge (1894) survives as a floating barge in Cleveland. It was used as the venue for the Hornblower's Restaurant until 2006, before being purchased by Cleveland Metroparks for restoration and undetermined future use.
- The pilot house from the Thomas Walters survives as part of the Ashtabula Maritime & Surface Transportation Museum in Ashtabula, Ohio. It's noted that the Walters was the freighter built to replace the SS William C. Moreland, which ran aground on Sawtooth Reef, Lake Superior.
- The remains of the freighter Sidney E. Smith Jr. (1906, originally W. K. Bixby), serves as part of a dock in Sarnia, Ontario.
- The pilot house of the former 1945-built LST, later rebuilt in 1949 as a tanker, the MV Polaris, once owned by Cleveland Tankers, survives in Ashtabula, Ohio, located at the A. R. U. Marina and Campground.
- The pilot house of the 1907-built Paul L. Tietjen survives and is owned by the Bum Boat Bar. The Tietjen is noted to have been a survivor of the Great Storm of 1913 when she was the Matthew Andrews.
- The Pilot house of the Irvan L. Clymer is located on Pier B in Duluth, Minnesota. Built in 1917 and scrapped in 1994 the Irvan L. Clymer's pilot house sits at the end of the pier.
- The pilot house of the Frontanec (1966) is preserved in Two Harbors, Minnesota after the Frontanec ran aground in 1979 and scrapped in 1985 in Duluth Minnesota her pilot house now sits near the light house at Two Harbors. The Frontanec's original pilot house from 1923 is now preserved in Fairport Harbor, Ohio the original pilot house was removed during the 1966-1967 Season winter layup.
- The pilot house of the SS Calcite is located on the grounds of 40 Mile Lighthouse Park in Rogers City, Michigan. The Calcite was built in 1912 and was at the time the largest self-unloading ship in the world.
- The pilothouse of the cement carrier S.S. St Mary's Challenger is located at the National Museum of the Great Lakes in Toledo, OH. The St. Mary's Challenger was converted to a barge in 2013.
