= Canal Park =

Canal Park may refer to a place in the United States:

- Canal Park (Duluth), Minnesota, a neighborhood
- 7 17 Credit Union Park, a baseball stadium in Akron, OH formerly named Canal Park
