= Duluth International Airport =

Airport in Duluth, Minnesota, United States

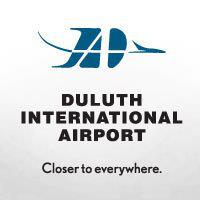

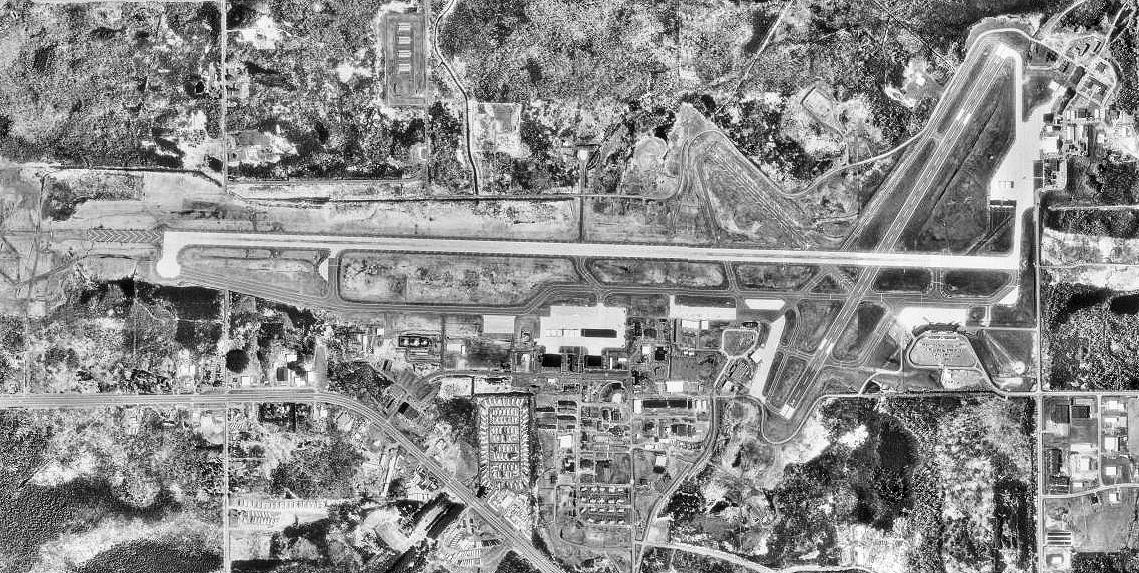
- IATA: DLH; ICAO: KDLH; FAA LID: DLH

Summary
- Airport type: Public
- Owner: City of Duluth, Minnesota
- Operator: Duluth Airport Authority
- Serves: Duluth, Minnesota and Superior, Wisconsin (Twin Ports)
- Location: St Louis County, Minnesota, United States
- Opened: 1930
- Elevation AMSL: 1,428 ft (435 m)
- Coordinates: 46°50′32″N 092°11′37″W
- Public transit access: Duluth Transit Authority
- Website: www.DuluthAirport.com

Map
- Location of the airport in Minnesota DLH (the United States)

Runways
Direction	Length		Surface
Direction	ft	m	Surface
9/27	10,591	3,228	Concrete
3/21	5,719	1,743	Asphalt

Statistics (2022)
- Total passengers (2021): 219,579
- Aircraft operations: 61,302
- Based aircraft: 89
- Sources: Airport website, FAA

For the United States Air Force use of this facility, see Duluth Air National Guard Base.

Duluth International Airport (IATA: DLH, ICAO: KDLH, FAA LID: DLH) is a city-owned public-use joint civil-military airport located five nautical miles (9 km) northwest of the central business district of Duluth, a city in Saint Louis County, Minnesota, United States. It serves the Twin Ports area, including Superior, Wisconsin. Mostly used for general aviation but also served by three airlines, it is Minnesota's third-busiest airport, behind Minneapolis–St. Paul International Airport (MSP) and Rochester International Airport.

The Minnesota Air National Guard's 148th Fighter Wing, equipped with F-16C Fighting Falcons, is based at Duluth Air National Guard Base, which is located on the grounds of the airport. Aircraft manufacturing company Cirrus is also based on the airport grounds, where it has its main manufacturing facilities, innovation center, and headquarters.

== History ==
The City of Duluth purchased the original property for the airport in 1929 from Saint Louis County. The airport was constructed on 640 acres (2.6 km^{2}) of land with two 2,650-foot (810 m) sod runways. In 1930, the airfield was dedicated as Williamson–Johnson Municipal Airport.

In 1940, Northwest Airlines began the first regularly scheduled air service to Duluth. Two years later, operations were temporarily halted by World War II.

In 1942, three runways were paved. Each runway was 4,000 feet (1,200 m) long, 150 feet (46 m) wide, and at nearly equal angles from each other, 30, 90, and 130 degrees. They were identified as runways 3–21, 9–27, and 13–31, respectively. The Corps of Engineers extended Runways 9–27 and 3–21 to 5,699 feet (1,737 m) in 1945. In 1951, the USAF extended Runway 9–27 to 9,000 feet (2,700 m) with a 1,000-foot (300 m) overrun and the control tower was built. Runway 9–27 was rebuilt in 1956 and extended in 1966 to 10,152 feet (3,094 m) in length.

The original terminal building was built in 1954, south of Runway 9–27 and west of Runway 3–21. The terminal floor area was 14,200 square feet (1,320 m^{2}) with 280 parking spaces. It would serve the airport for nearly 20 years.

In 1961, the Duluth Airport Authority Board renamed the facility Duluth International Airport.

In 1973, a new Terminal Building and U.S. Customs, International Arrivals Building, were completed east of Runway 13–31 and opened for operation. Runway 13–31 was shortened to 2,578 feet (786 m) to accommodate construction of an addition to the International Arrivals building. This resulted in Runway 13–31 being closed as a runway due to obstructions. Runway 13–31 was re-striped in 1980, decreasing its width to 75 feet (23 m), for use as a taxiway. In 1989, the newer terminal building and the adjacent structures were connected to form one enclosure. The original terminal building was then converted for use as offices for general aviation, the FAA, and the U.S. Weather Bureau.

Since 2001, Minnesota's largest airshow, the Duluth Air & Aviation Expo, takes place each year on the grounds of Duluth International Airport.

In 2013, a new passenger terminal was built directly in front of the 1973 terminal (with the 1973 terminal building having its last flight take place on January 13, 2013). This new building solved several problems of the previous terminal building, including that the tails of parked airplanes extended too close to the runway due to FAA airspace changes made after the building's completion. This terminal building has restrooms and concessions beyond the TSA security checkpoint, something the previous terminal lost when screening processes were put in place after 9/11. The first flight to leave the new terminal was on January 14: United Express Flight 5292 to Chicago O'Hare.

On October 30, 2015, the new terminal was named for the late U.S. Representative Jim Oberstar, who represented the congressional district in which the airport lies from 1975 to 2011 and helped secure funding for the facility before its 2013 opening.

A 370-stall parking ramp with skywalk connection to the terminal was completed in fall 2014.

On May 23, 2019, American Airlines began twice-daily service to Chicago O'Hare International Airport. American ceased operations into Duluth in April 2020, citing lackluster demand. This route is still served multiple times daily by United Express.

In 2020, the airport received a $5,246,844 federal grant via the CARES Act.

On November 17, 2025, the airport received a $20.5 million federal grant to replace its aging ATC tower through the Infrastructure Investment and Jobs Act

On June 10, 2026, the airport announced that Sun County Airlines would be returning with seasonal, twice-weekly service to Fort Myers, Florida beginning on January 29, 2027, using 737-800s.

== Facilities and aircraft ==
Duluth International Airport covers an area of 3,020 acres (1,220 ha) at an elevation of 1,428 feet (435 m) above mean sea level. It has two runways: 9/27 is 10,591 by 150 feet (3,228 m × 46 m) with a concrete surface and 3/21 is 5,719 by 150 feet (1,743 m × 46 m) with an asphalt surface.

For the year ending December 31, 2022, the airport had 61,302 aircraft operations, an average of 168 per day: 78% general aviation, 7% military, 11% air taxi and 3% scheduled commercial. At that time, there were 89 aircraft based at this airport: 49 single-engine, 10 multi-engine, 4 jet, 4 helicopter and 22 military.

== Airlines and destinations ==
=== Passenger ===
Airlines	Destinations
Delta Connection	Minneapolis/St. Paul
United Express	Chicago–O'Hare

=== Cargo ===
Airlines	Destinations
FedEx Feeder operated by Mountain Air Cargo	Minneapolis/St. Paul

Destinations map
Destinations from Duluth International Airport
Red = Year-round destination
Green = Seasonal destination
Blue = Future destination

== Ground transportation ==
The Duluth Transit Authority operates route 108 from the downtown Duluth Transit Center. Arrowhead Transit operates connected inter-county routes to destinations outside of the Twin Ports, including Grand Marais, Hibbing, Virginia, and Grand Rapids. Sun Country operates a Landline bus service to Minneapolis–Saint Paul International Airport's Terminal 2 from DLH.

== Statistics ==
=== Top destinations ===
Busiest domestic routes from DLH (Septamber 2025 – August 2026)
Rank	Airport	Passengers	Carriers
1	Minneapolis/Saint Paul, Minnesota	89,510	Delta
2	Chicago–O'Hare, Illinois	51,650	United

== Accidents ==
- On May 31, 1954, a USAF Douglas C-47 crashed in a gravel pit in heavy fog at then Duluth-Williamson-Johnson Municipal Airport. Eleven of the 14 occupants on board were killed.

== See also ==
- Duluth Transit Authority
- Duluth Transportation Center
- Duluth Union Depot
- List of airports in Minnesota
- Minnesota Aviation Hall of Fame
- Northern Lights Express
