= USACE Bayfield =

Tugboat built in 1953

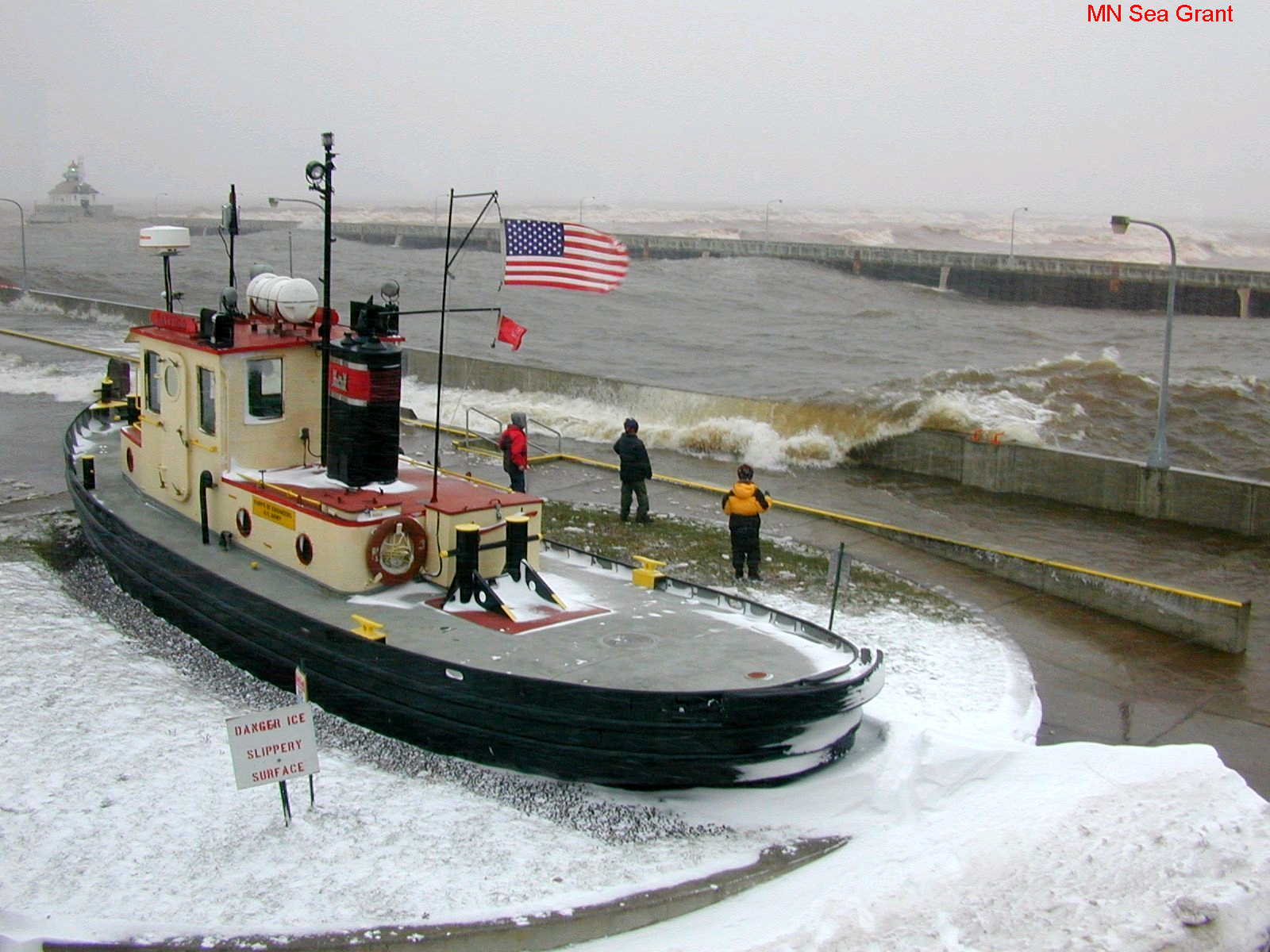
- Bayfield on Lake Superior in 2001

History
- Owner: 1953 - 1962 United States Army as ST-2023; 1962 - 1995 U.S. Army Corps of Engineers as USACE Bayfield; 1995 - current Lake Superior Maritime Visitor Center - Bayfield
- Builder: Roamer Boat Company in Holland, Michigan
- Completed: 1953
- In service: 1953-1995
- Status: Museum ship at Lake Superior Maritime Visitor Center, Duluth, Minnesota

General characteristics
- Type: Tugboat
- Tonnage: 122 gross register tons (GRT)
- Length: 45 ft (14 m)
- Beam: 13 ft (4.0 m)
- Depth: 7 ft (2.1 m)
- Installed power: 125 bhp
- Propulsion: Detroit Diesel, Detroit 8V-71

USACE Bayfield
- Location within Minnesota
- Location: 600 South Lake Avenue, Duluth, Minnesota
- Coordinates: 46°46′47.5″N 92°5′32.5″W
- Website: LSMMA website

USACE Bayfield is tugboat museum ship at Lake Superior Maritime Visitor Center, Duluth, Minnesota. Bayfield was built in 1953 as United States Army tugboat ST-2023. The Army's ST, small tugs, ranged from about 55 ft (17 m) to 92 ft (28 m) in length. The ST-2023 was built by the Roamer Boat Company in Holland, Michigan. Roamer Boat Company was founded by Robert R. Linn in 1946. ST-2023 was the 8th hull built by Roamer Boat Company. Bayfield is a small steel hull harbor tug. ST-2023 is of the design 320 type. Design 320 type is based on the Equity 45 type tugboat that was designed by Equitable Equipment Company. The Equitable Equipment Company was founded by Neville Levy in 1921 and is located on the Tchefuncte River in Madisonville, Louisiana, The United States Army transferred ST-2023 to the U.S. Army Corps of Engineers (USACE) in 1962 as USACE Bayfield. Bayfield was retired in 1995, and transferred as a fully functional museum ship to the Lake Superior Maritime Visitor Center. She is powered by a single diesel engine (Detroit 8V-71) built by Detroit Diesel with a single propeller. She as a length of 45 ft (14 m), a beam of 13 ft (4.0 m) and depth of 6 ft (1.8 m).

== See also ==
- List of museum ships in North America
- List of Great Lakes museum and historic ships
- List of museums in Minnesota
- Alma (tugboat)
