= Anchor Bar and Grill =

Restaurant in Superior, Wisconsin

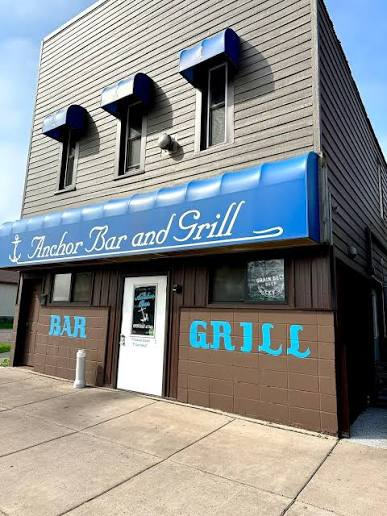
- The Anchor Bar & Grill building in Superior Wisconsin
- Interactive map of Anchor Bar and Grill

Restaurant information
- Established: 1977; 49 years ago
- Owners: Adam and Aaron Anderson
- Food type: Bar and Grill
- Location: 413 Tower Ave., Superior, Douglas County, Wisconsin, 54880, United States
- Coordinates: 46.7333°N 92.1040°W
- Seating capacity: Indoor and Outdoor seating
- Reservations: No
- Website: anchorbarandgrill.com

The Anchor Bar and Grill is a long-running tavern and burger restaurant known for its Lake Superior shipping theme and extensive collection of maritime memorabilia. The restaurant is located on the historic Tower Avenue in Superior, Wisconsin. The Anchor has a reputation of good portions at an affordable price.

== Overview ==
The business as its known today was founded in 1977 when the building was purchased by Tom Anderson and his family. Originally a bar frequented by workers at the nearby shipyard, the establishment grew overtime under the management of Bean Prettie, who worked at the Anchor for over 40 years. Today the Anchor is known for its Burgers and Fries and intentionally limited menu. Many of the burgers on the menu were made by Tom and Bean in the 1980s and 1990s and are still served the same way today.

Over time the Anchor began collecting national and regional awards for its burgers. The restaurant gained wider exposure through an appearance on the eleventh season of Food Network's "Diners, Drive-Ins and Dives." During the show, host Guy Fieri played clips of many of the famous burgers from the Anchor including the Cashew Burger, Jalapeño Cream Cheese Burger, Hawaiian Burger, and the large Galley Buster burger.

The restaurants signature burger is called the Anchor Burger, which is two-thirds of a pound of the signature Wisconsin beef topped with Tomato, onions, cheese, and lettuce. However, this is not the largest burger at the Anchor, which is the Gally Buster Burger. this burger is three cheese patties totaling one pound of Wisconsin beef stacked tall with onions and is served with a large amount of fires.

Hamburger America, a book about the best burgers in the United States, listed the Anchor as an essential burger that any American must try before they die.

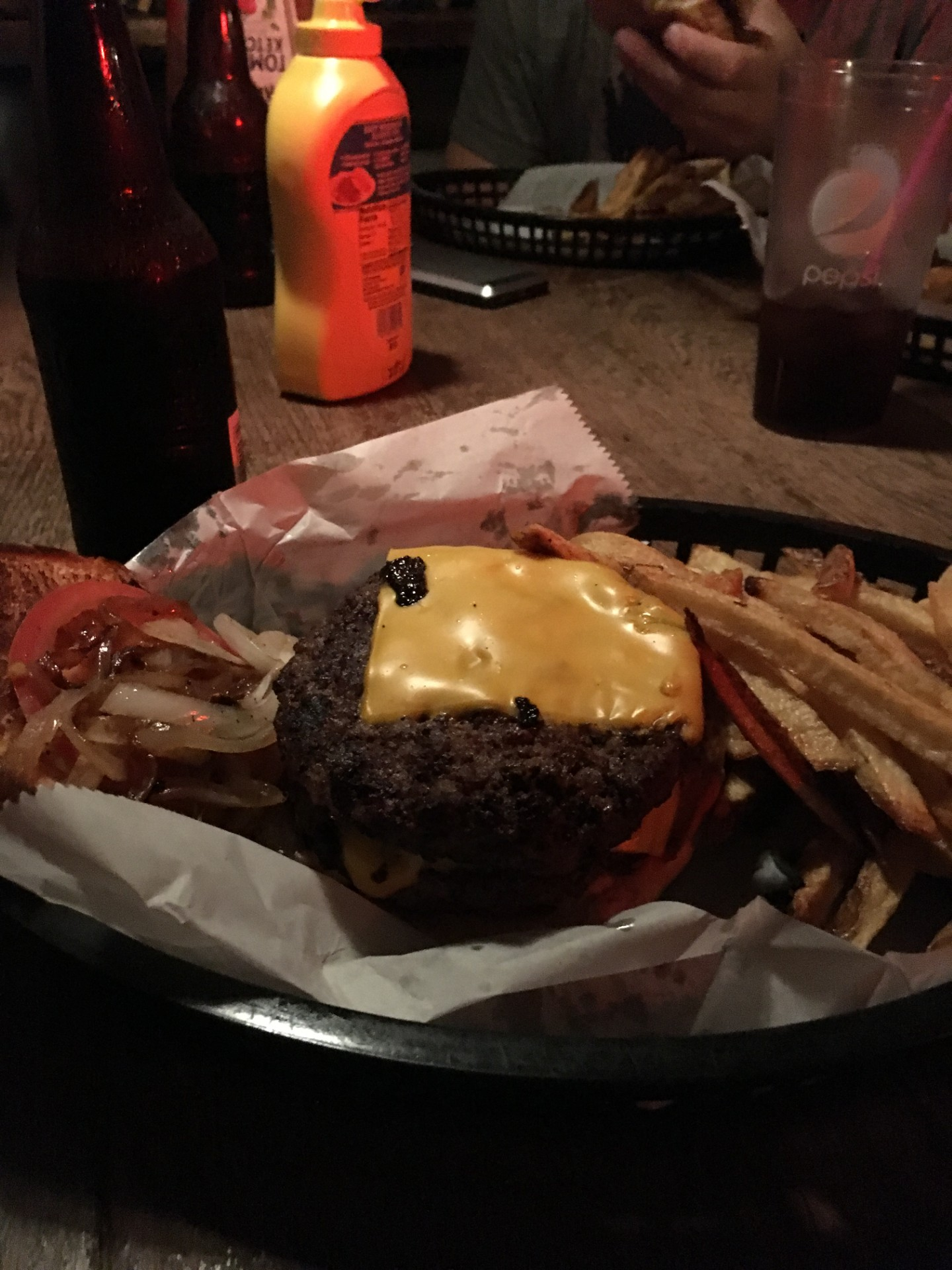
Burger at The Anchor Bar & Grill

== Maritime Artifacts ==
The Anchor Bar is well known for a collection of Great Lakes and maritime artifacts, including a life ring claimed to have originated from the SS Edmund Fitzgerald. The walls are heavily decorated with scavenger hunts on the menu to find certain items or count how many globes are on the walls.

Some other items on the wall include windows from an old local church, a library of old books on Great Lakes ships, and many more items from ships decommissioned at the local port.

On November 10 of every year the Anchor honors the wreck of the Edmund Fitzgerald with a symbolic 29 rings of a ship bell in the restaurant, symbolizing one ring for each man who died on the wreck. This ceremony is followed with a playing of the song written by Gordon Lightfoot to memorialize the sinking.

== Honors ==
- Won several categories 14 years in a row in the Northland Reader best of contest, including Best Bar & Grill and Best Really, Really Cheap Food
- 1st place in the Salvation Army Hamburger Hunt
- Won 2 years in a row Duluth News Tribune Best Hamburger Hunt
- 1st place Chamber of Commerce Best Burger Contest
- Won 2 years KZIO radio Hamburger Hunt contest
- Won in several categories in Ripsaw contest
- Won first place in Duluth City award for hamburgers
- Listed in book “500 Things to Eat Before It’s to Late”
- Article in Gourmet Magazine June 2009 mentions the Anchor in the top 20
- Article in Duluth-Superior Magazine 2010
- Had featured drink listed in Food Show Network Magazine
- Featured on Diners, Dives and Drive-ins on Food Show Network
- Talked about on Savvy PBS radio station
- Mentioned in several travel books on where to eat
- Featured in book Hamburger America as one of 150 great burger joints in USA
- Placed in Living North contest as one of the best restaurants in Superior-Duluth
- Named #8 in Best Taverns in Wisconsin book
- Listed as #1 cheap good burger in Wisconsin in Wisconsin Trails Magazine
- Won first place in Best Of the Northland Hamburger Contest 2012-Duluth Tribune
- B-105 Radio one of the 5 cheapest eats in the Twin Ports
