= Central Hillside =

Neighborhood of Duluth, Minnesota

Coordinates: 46°47′16″N 92°6′31″W

Central Hillside is a neighborhood in Duluth, Minnesota, United States; located directly uphill from the city's downtown. The neighborhood offers views of the city and lake.

Duluth's Mesaba Avenue (Highway 194) travels through the Central Hillside neighborhood. Many residents consider the area west of Mesaba Avenue to be the Observation Hill neighborhood, which is not included on official city maps. Mesaba Avenue, Lake Avenue, and Fourth Street are three of the main routes in the community.

Central Hillside has several notable architectural gems, including the Sacred Heart Center on Fourth Street. Buckingham Creek flows through the neighborhood near 12th Avenue West.

== Demographics ==
=== Race and ethnicity ===
- White 76.6%
- Black or African American 7.4%
- American Indian and Alaskan Native 4.7%
- Asian or Pacific Islander alone 2.0%
- Two or more races 6.9%
- Hispanic or Latino 2.5%

=== Languages ===
Primary language spoken at home:

- English only 93.4%
- Other 6.6%
- Speaks English less than "very well" 1.8%

=== Education ===
- Less than high school 11.5%
- High school diploma or GED 23.7%
- Some college or associate’s degree 33.7%
- Bachelor's Degree 22.4%
- Graduate or professional degree 8.7%
- High school graduate or higher 88.5%
- Bachelor's degree or higher 31.1%

== Adjacent Neighborhoods ==
(Directions following those of Duluth's general street grid system, not actual geographical coordinates)

- East Hillside (east)
- Downtown Duluth (south)
- Duluth Heights (north)
- Lincoln Park (west)

== External links and references ==
- City of Duluth website
- City map of neighborhoods (PDF)

== See also ==
- Duluth, Minnesota
- Mesaba Avenue – State Highway 194 (MN 194)
