= Duluth Transportation Center =

Bus station in Duluth, Minnesota

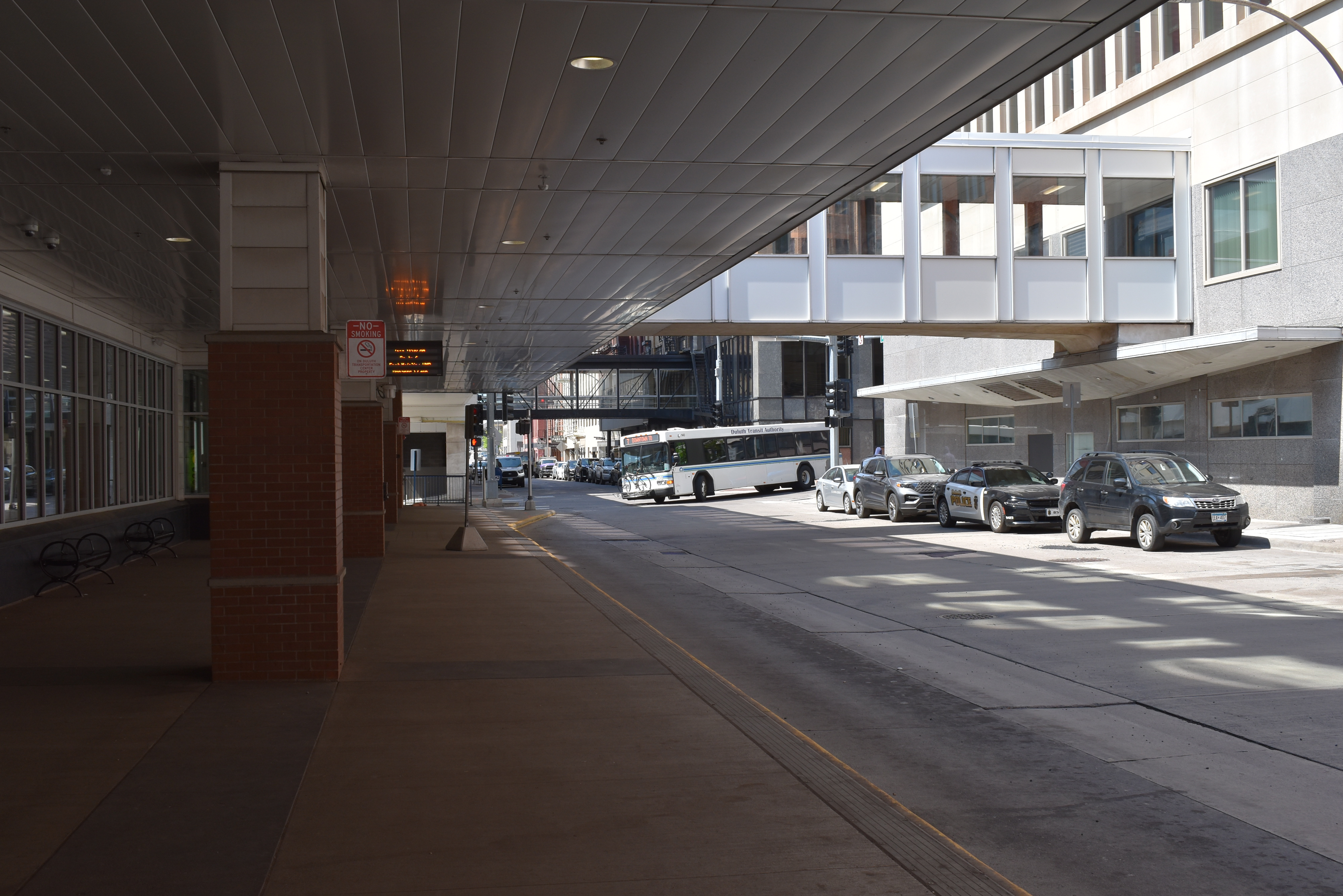
- The front of the DTC with a bus approaching

General information
- Location: 228 W Michigan Street, Duluth, MN 55802
- Coordinates: 46°47′2″N 92°6′2″W
- Owner: Duluth Transit Authority
- Lines: Duluth Transit Authority; Arrowhead Transit; Jefferson Lines; Amtrak Thruway

Construction
- Parking: Public Parking

History
- Opened: February 4, 2016
Location

Duluth Transportation Center (DTC) is a bus station in Duluth, Minnesota, served by urban transit, rural transit, and intercity buses. Duluth Transportation Center is the downtown hub for the Duluth transit system.

Urban transit routes at the center are operated by Duluth Transit Authority, the third-largest transit operator in Minnesota. Regional rural transit is provided from the station by Arrowhead Transit. Intercity services are operated by Jefferson Lines.

== Construction ==
Duluth Transportation Center was built in February 2016, replacing an existing parking ramp. The building was designed by LHB Architects and Engineers and LSA Design. Mortenson Construction was the contractor. Construction cost $30 million.

The center experienced a setback in 2015 when construction workers discovered a city storm sewer with a large hole that had been leaking for some time. The city authorized the site’s main contractor, Mortenson Construction, to repair the line, putting the storm sewer on pilings.

== Design and layout ==
The DTC has 8 docks for bus boarding, with space for layovers. Passenger waiting areas are heated during the winter.

Skyways to nearby buildings were replaced during construction, providing improved pedestrian access. Skyways connect to Northwest Passage, Harbor Center, Wells Fargo and the Transit Center East facility.

There are 410 public access parking spaces and 120 bike-storage spaces.

== Operation ==
Arrowhead Transit operates several connections to the DTC.

Duluth Transit operates its downtown routes through the DTC.

Jefferson Lines operates services to the Twin Cities and central Minnesota. Jefferson Lines paper tickets are sold at the station.
