= Lake Superior Maritime Visitor Center =

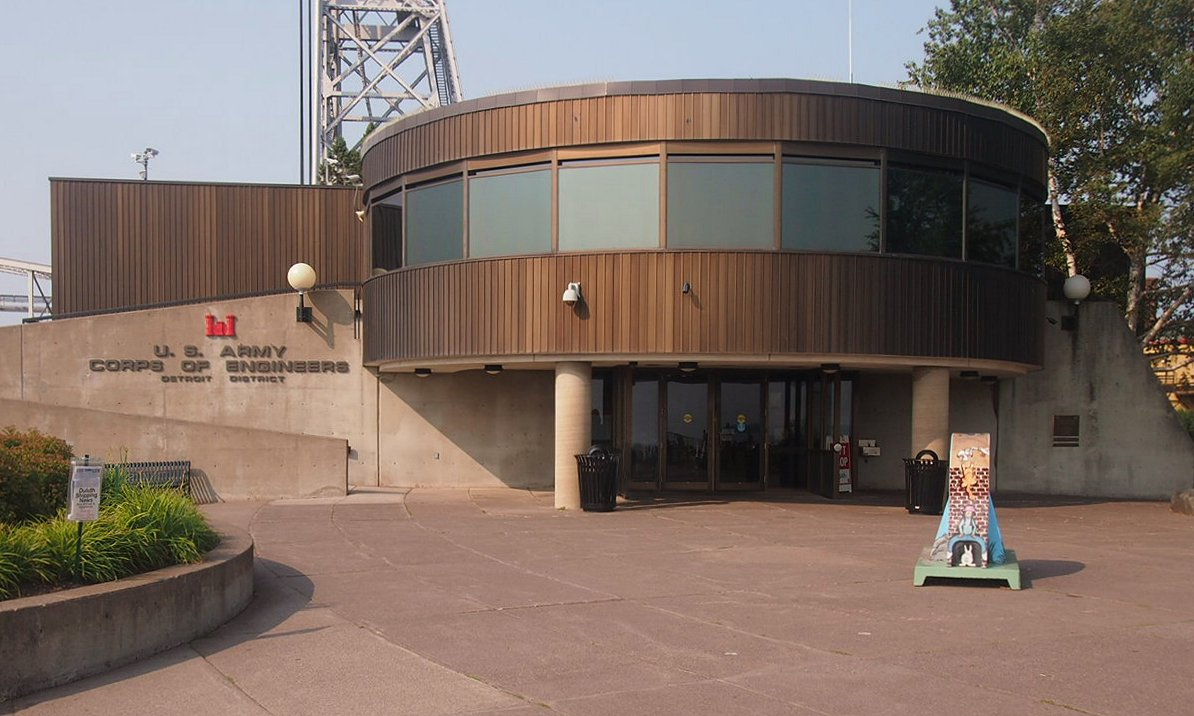
- The Lake Superior Maritime Visitor Center from the east

- Location within Minnesota
- Established: September 29, 1973
- Location: 600 South Lake Avenue, Duluth, Minnesota
- Coordinates: 46°46′47.5″N 92°5′32.5″W
- Type: Maritime museum
- Directors: James L. Banks, Allouez Marine Supply, Inc.
- Public transit access: DTA
- Website: LSMMA website

The Lake Superior Maritime Visitor Center is a museum in Duluth, Minnesota, operated by the United States Army Corps of Engineers.

== Background ==
The museum is in Duluth's Canal Park near the Aerial Lift Bridge and overlooks the entrance to the Duluth-Superior harbor.

The museum and grounds are all property of the U.S. federal government. All visitors are welcome to visit this museum without paying. Donations are accepted by the Lake Superior Marine Museum Association, and support general maintenance and upkeep of the building, new exhibit development and acquisition, and staffing.

Exhibits demonstrate the history and operations of upper Great Lakes commercial shipping and the Aerial Lift Bridge. Many visitors particularly enjoy the three historically accurate replica cabins and a pilothouse from typical ships which plowed the waves of Lake Superior in years past. A three-story steam engine, 50 scale models and many interactive displays are available for visitors to explore.

Thousand-foot-long freighters pass within 200 feet (61 m) of the building, underneath the Aerial Lift Bridge, which lifts up to allow them to pass through.

== See also ==
- USACE Bayfield
- List of museums in Minnesota
