= Miller Hill Mall =

- Location: Duluth, Minnesota, United States
- Coordinates: 46°48′13″N 92°09′36″W
- Opened: 1973
- Developer: Melvin Simon & Associates, Inc.
- Manager: Simon Property Group
- Owner: Simon Property Group
- Architect: The Law Company (Wichita, KS)
- Num. of stores: 103
- Num. of anchor tenants: 11 (9 open, 2 vacant)
- Floor area: 831,911 square feet (77,287.1 square meters)
- Floors: 1 (2 in JCPenney and former Younkers)
- Public transit: DTA
- Website: www.simon.com/mall/miller-hill-mall

Miller Hill Mall is a shopping mall located in Duluth, Minnesota, United States. It is located on U.S. Highway 53 where it intersects Trinity Road. The mall, owned by Simon Property Group, features 103 stores and a food court. The mall's anchor stores are JCPenney, Dick's Sporting Goods, Essentia Health - Health and Wellness Center, Essentia Health Surgery Center & Pharmacy, DSW, Barnes & Noble, Ulta Beauty. Dining options include Applebee's, Pizza Ranch, Noodles & Company, Chipotle Mexican Grill, Chilly Billy's Frozen Yogurt, and many more.

== History ==
The mall opened in 1973 and was expanded in 1987. When Mercantile Stores' Glass Block store was acquired by Dillard's, the anchor was then sold to Younkers.

The front facade displays many of the stores along U.S. Highway 53. In 2001, Longtime anchor Montgomery Ward was replaced by DSW Shoe Warehouse, Barnes & Noble and Old Navy, and the movie theater became Great American Bar & Grill, greatly improving the look of the front façade due to new architectural designs.

In 2007, the front façade and surrounding space in front of the recently vacated Walgreens was demolished. Inside the mall the entire section of the mall that used to house Walgreens and a few other small unsuccessful stores was walled off. This area is now home to a lifestyle center which includes a brand-new mall entrance and stores facing the highway including Men's Wearhouse, Noodles and Company, Chipotle, Five Guys Burgers and Fries, and AT&T.

A Culver's restaurant opened outside the mall on May 24, 2010.

Dick's Sporting Goods opened at the mall in September 2013.

On April 18, 2018, it was announced that Younkers would be closing as parent company The Bon-Ton Stores was going out of business. The store closed on August 29, 2018.

On May 31, 2018, Sears announced that it would be closing its Miller Hill location in September 2018, as part of a plan to close 72 stores nationwide. This closing left Dick's Sporting Goods and JCPenney as the only traditional anchors at the mall.

Part of the mall's roof collapsed on March 14, 2023, before the mall was due to open for the day. The collapse was presumably due to the weight of snow on the roof. Employees were evacuated, and the mall remained closed for the next several days. No one was injured in the roof collapse.

== Movies at the Miller Hill Mall ==
It began as a United Artist Theatre in 1976 and continued to serve mall patrons for several decades as a first-run theater. However, as a small, three-screen theater, it faced strong competition from the larger 8 and 10 multiplex theaters that were built in the 1980s and 1990s, located within two miles (3 km) of the Mall. Additionally, the facility suffered from a lack of investment and was seriously showing its age by the mid-1990s. In the late 1990s, the Movies at Miller Hill Mall became a second-run theater, showing films between 6 and 12 months old; tickets cost $2. The entire section was torn down and the space became occupied by Grandma's Restaurants, a local chain of restaurants headquartered in Duluth's Canal Park. Originally, Grandma's established a clone of its popular Little Angies restaurant located in Canal Park, but it was closed shortly after. Grandma's replaced Little Angies with an original concept, The Great American Bar & Grill which closed in 2011. The large sign for the Miller Hill Mall that stands on the edge of U.S Highway 53 was refurbished and repainted after the closure of the movie theater. The space on the sign that formerly displayed what movies were showing is now advertising space for local radio stations.
