= Lake Superior College =

Community college in Duluth, Minnesota, U.S.

Coordinates: 46.7841417°N 92.1448306°W

- Motto: Where Your Future Begins
- Type: Public community college
- Established: 1995
- Parent institution: Minnesota State
- President: Linda Kingston
- Students: 5,800
- Location: Duluth, Minnesota, United States
- Campus: Main, 97 acres (39 ha) and Gary/New Duluth, 105 acres (42 ha) Center for Advanced Aviation
- Mascot: IceHawks
- Website: lsc.edu

Lake Superior College (LSC) is a public community college in Duluth, Minnesota.

== History ==
Lake Superior College was created when the Duluth Technical College and Duluth Community College Center (the Duluth campus of Hibbing Community College) merged in 1995. At the time, Duluth Community College was housed in a wing of The Marshall School, and Duluth Technical College was housed in LSC's current location. The community college programs moved to the former Technical School campus when it was expanded in 1996.

== Facilities ==
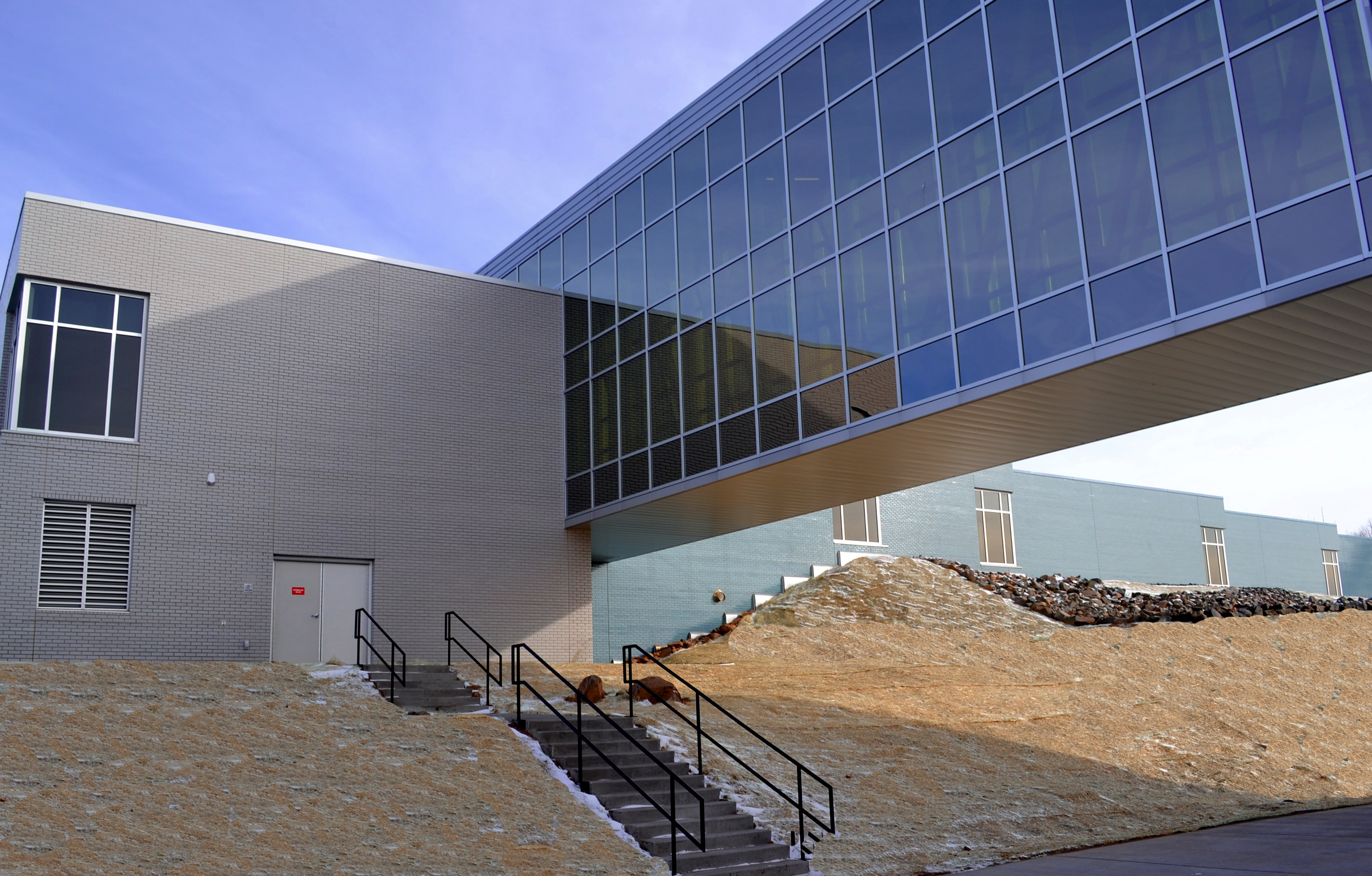
LSC Health and Science Building

Built in 1968, LSC's main campus is on Trinity Road in Duluth on a 97-acre (39 ha) tract that overlooks the western portion of the Duluth/Superior harbor and the Saint Louis River. The campus features an award-winning hiking trail and a trout stream, Miller Creek. Facilities have been expanded and upgraded over the years. In 2007, the Academic and Student Services building was completed and an area of the campus was renovated to house a Student Life Center.

On March 14, 2010, legislation was enacted approving funding for a new Health and Sciences Center addition. The $12 million+ project broke ground on June 11, 2010, and the grand opening was on January 6, 2012. The building opened for classes on January 9.

In addition to its main campus, LSC also operates an Emergency Response Training Center on 105 acres (42 ha) in Gary/New Duluth and a Professional Pilot Training Center out of leased facilities at the Duluth International Airport.

Lake Superior College opened a Duluth Downtown Center in 2014 to house welding, computer-aided drafting, and machining programs. This move increased the amount of teaching space in these fields from 3,000 square feet to 33,700 and included new equipment for labs. The Downtown Center closed in July 2024 because the building owner needed additional space. Those integrated manufacturing programs moved back to the Main Campus as part of the T-Building expansion in spring of 2025.

In September 2016, LSC opened a new Center for Advanced Aviation in Hangar 103 at the Duluth International Airport. LSC's aviation programs—professional pilot and aviation maintenance technician—are now under one roof. This 40,000-square-foot facility was remodeled to serve FAA teaching requirements.

== Accreditation ==
Lake Superior College is accredited by the Higher Learning Commission of the North Central Association of Colleges and Schools.

== Leadership ==
The president of Lake Superior College is Linda Kingston. Kingston succeeded Patricia Rogers on July 1, 2025. Rogers began her assignment in 2019, succeeding Patrick M. Johns. Johns began his assignment on July 1, 2010, succeeding Kathleen Nelson, who had served as president for 13 years. LSC's first president was Harold Erickson. He served from 1995 to 1997.

== Sustainability ==
Lake Superior College aligns its triple bottom line sustainability goals through academic planning (economy), strategic planning (society), and facilities planning (environment), and has developed strategies to achieve goals related to each.

A part of the Lake Superior Watershed, Lake Superior College is strongly committed to environmental stewardship and sustainable development. In 2010, the Academic and Student Services "S" building became the first LEED Certified project in the Minnesota State Colleges and Universities System and continues to build and renovate to at least LEED Silver standards. LSC regularly monitors energy and water consumption for its 15 buildings and almost 400,000 square feet of space, with a goal of reducing overall carbon emissions by 50% from its 2009 baseline by 2030. LSC reports its electric, natural gas, and water use to the Buildings, Benchmarks and Beyond (B3) public reporting database, where it is benchmarked against peers and tracks its progress toward reduction goals. In 2017, LSC was awarded a "Best of B3 Benchmarking" statewide award for its year-over-year energy efficiency improvement.

Lake Superior College is a member of the Association for the Advancement of Sustainability in Higher Education (AASHE), a 2008 signatory of the American Colleges and Universities Presidents' Climate Commitment (ACUPCC), a 2013 Sustainable Twin Ports Early Adopter, and a member of the Upper Midwest Association for Campus Sustainability (UMACS).

== Governance ==
Lake Superior College is a member of the Minnesota State Colleges and Universities System.

Lake Superior College is immune to "Educational Malpractice" lawsuits.
