= Canal Park, Duluth, Minnesota =

District of Duluth, Minnesota, United States

Coordinates: 46°46′49″N 92°5′35″W

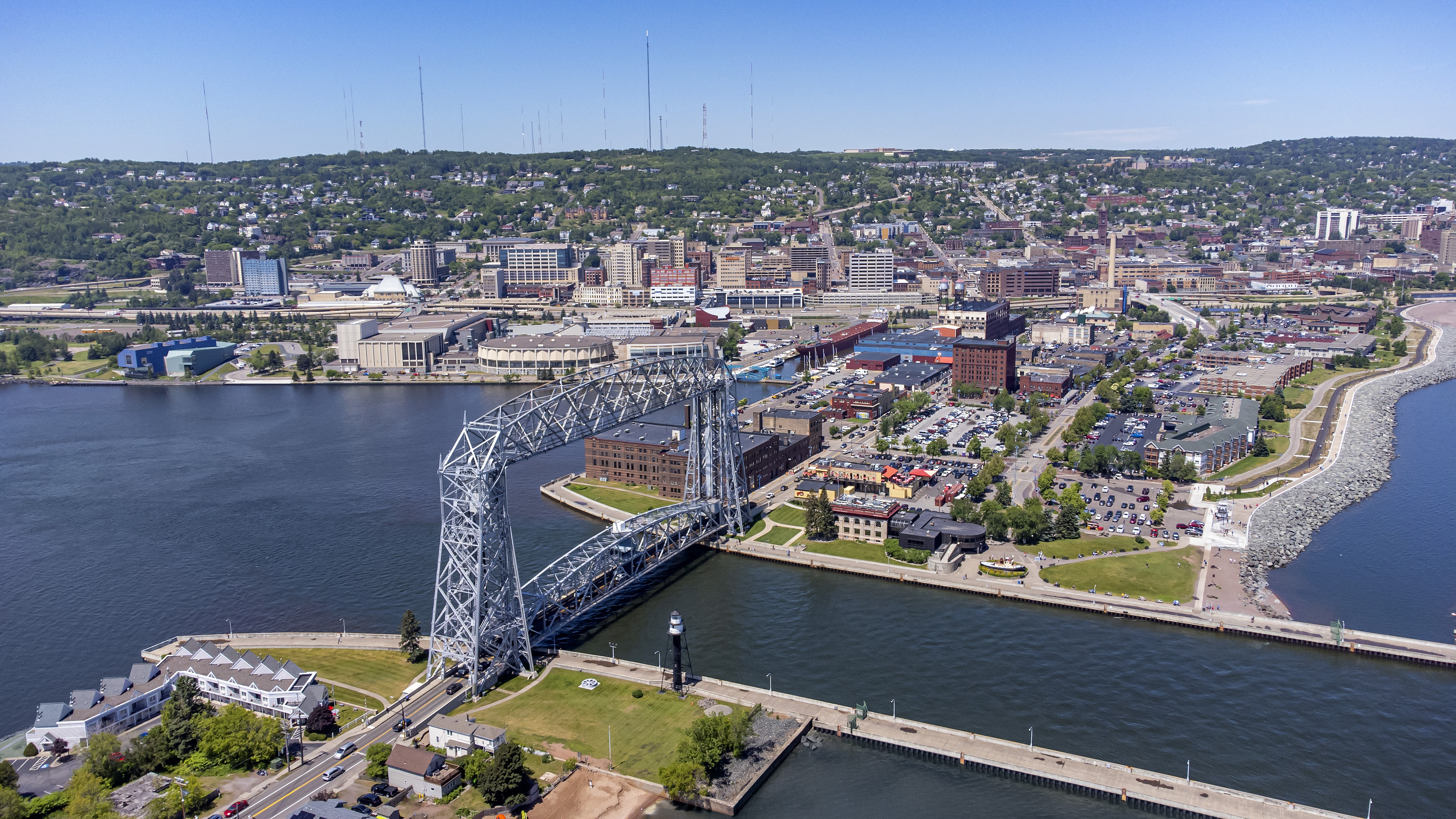
Canal Park aerial view

Canal Park is a tourist and recreation-oriented district of Duluth, Minnesota, United States. Situated across the Interstate 35 freeway from Downtown Duluth, it is connected by the Aerial Lift Bridge across the Duluth Ship Canal to the Park Point sandbar and neighborhood. Canal Park Drive and Lake Avenue South serve as the main routes in Canal Park.

== History ==
Canal Park is largely a conversion of an old warehouse district into restaurants, shops (especially those dealing in antiques and other novelties), cafés, and hotels. This conversion began in the 1980s as an attempt to use Duluth's rich industrial past, the decline of which had left the city in economic turmoil at the time, as an asset in a prospective tourist industry.

== Attractions ==
Many annual events are held in the Canal Park area, such as the Bayfront Blues Festival and Grandma's Marathon, which starts in Two Harbors, Minnesota, and finishes in Canal Park.

Some of Canal Park's attractions include a 4.2 mile long lake walk, a lighthouse pier, the Lake Superior Maritime Visitor Center, the Great Lakes Aquarium, and the William A. Irvin floating ship museum. Those interested in boats will also enjoy watching vessels from around the world enter Duluth's port.

Until January 2017, Canal Park was the home of broadcast studios for four Red Rock Radio stations. The Duluth NBC affiliate KBJR is still located in Canal Park.

The Duluth Entertainment Convention Center (DECC) now connected to the new AMSOIL Arena and the area's prominent entertainment venue, is also located in the district. The DECC provides an indoor connection to the skywalk system in Downtown Duluth.

== Gallery ==
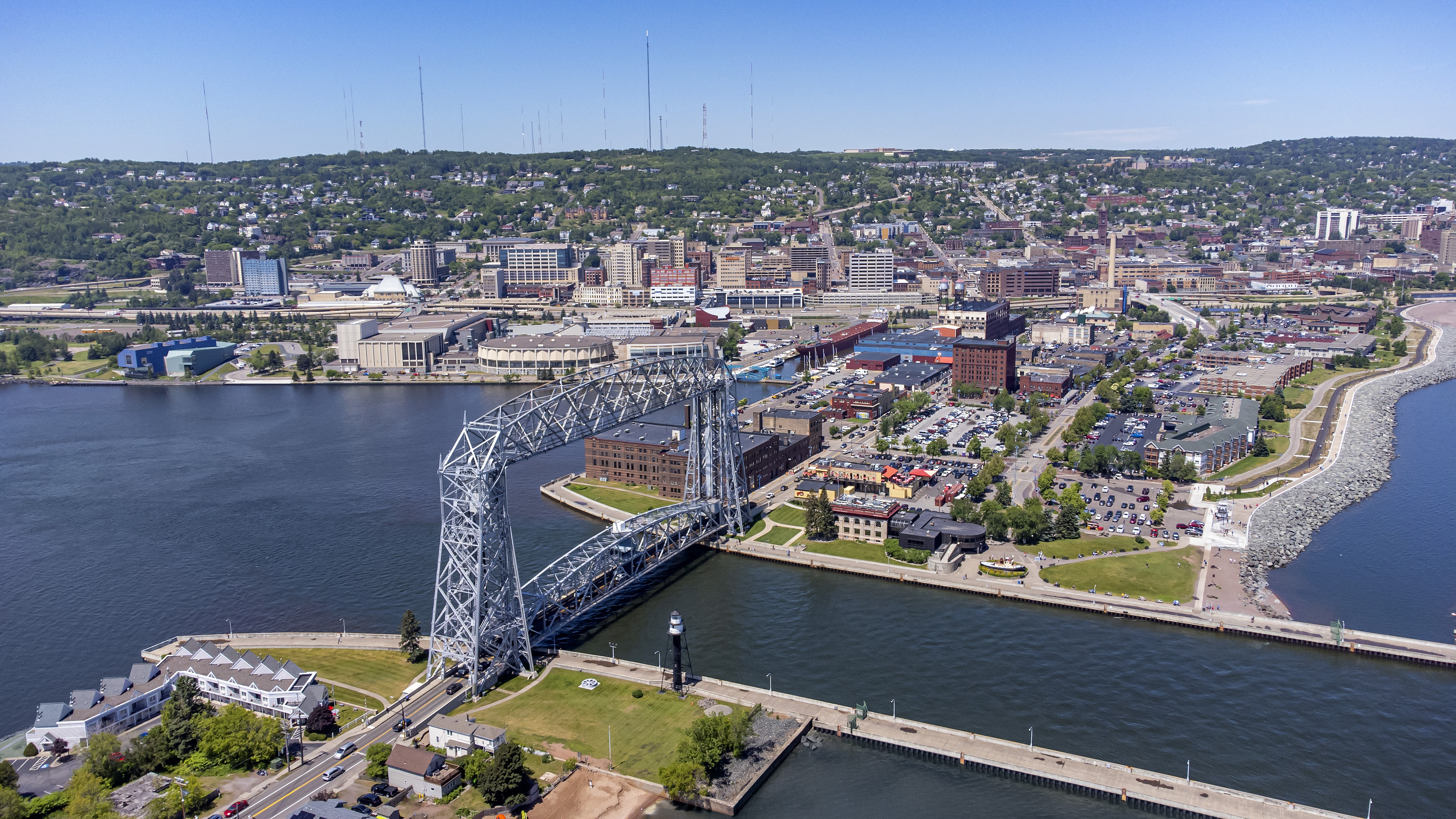
Aerial view with downtown and skyline

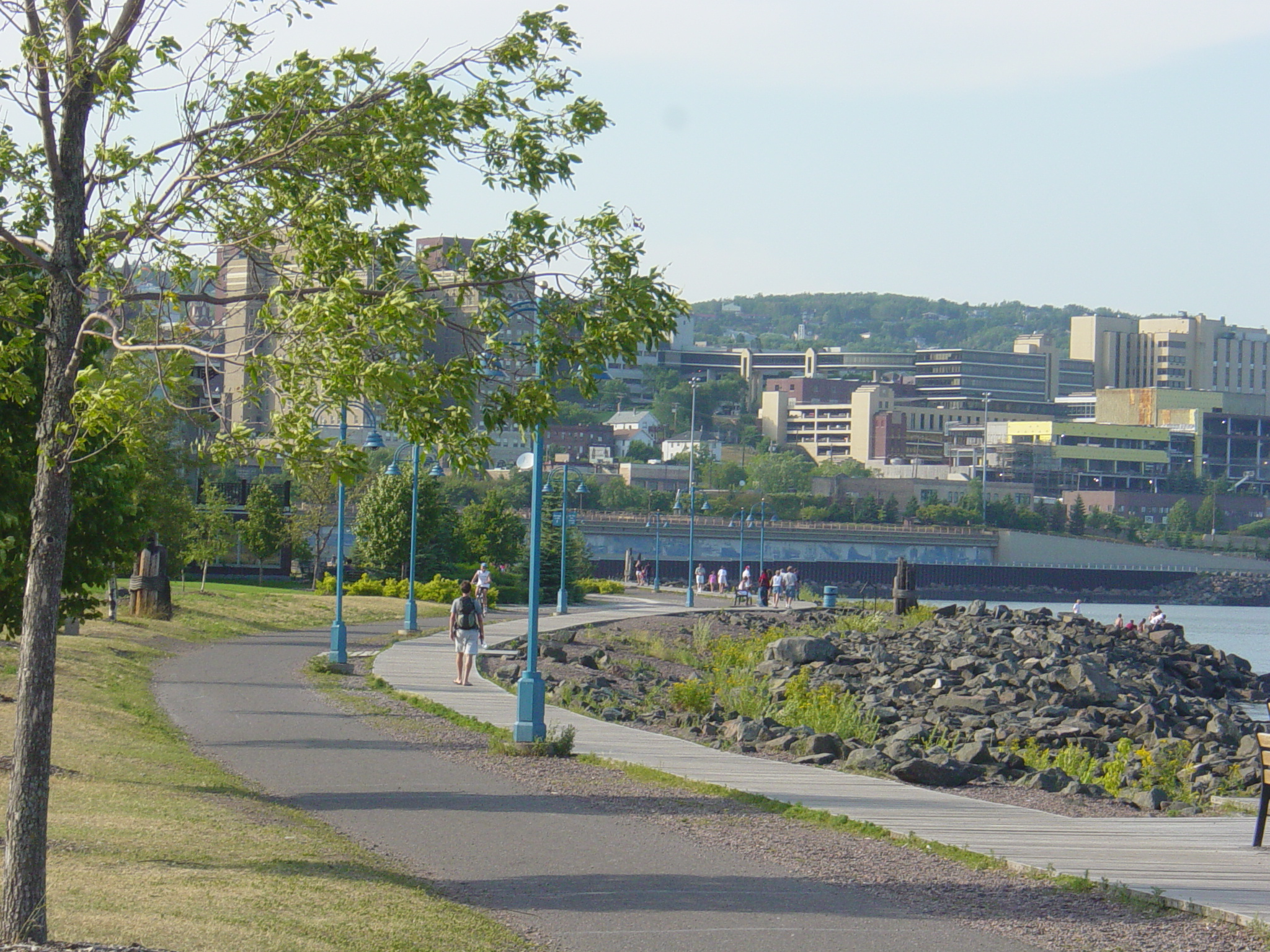
Lakewalk

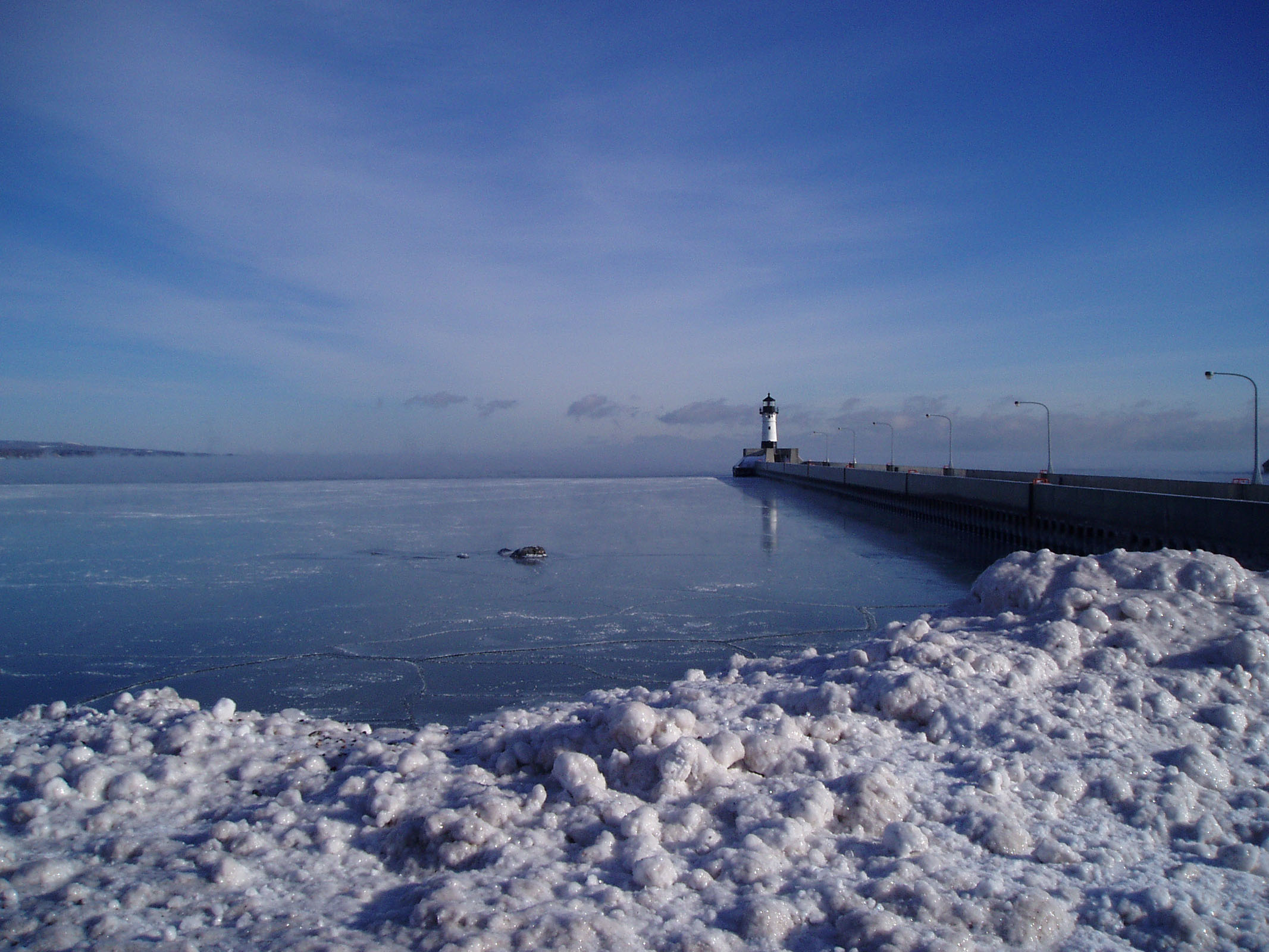
Lighthouse pier

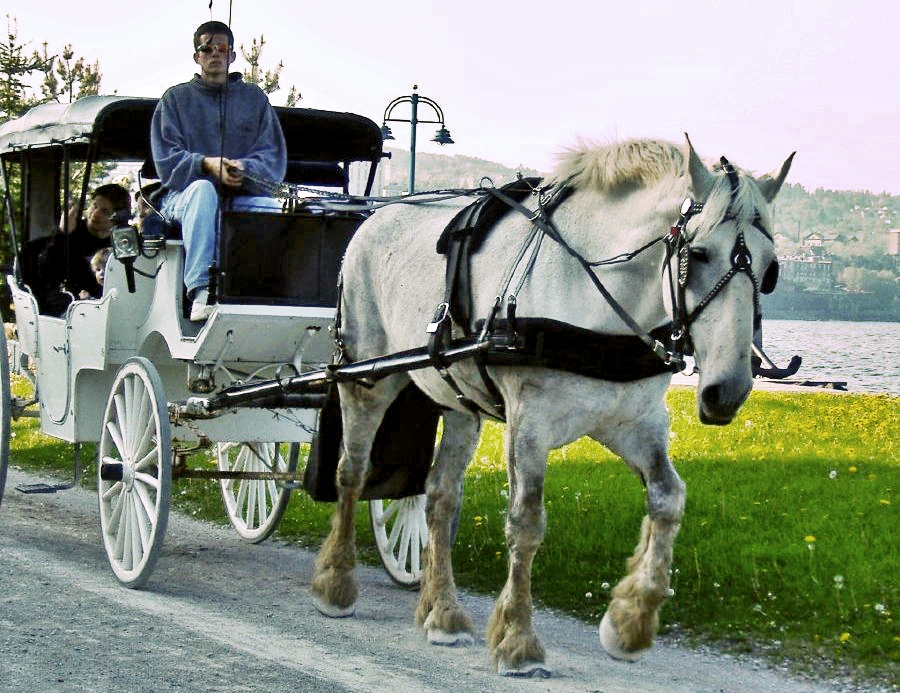
Carriage ride

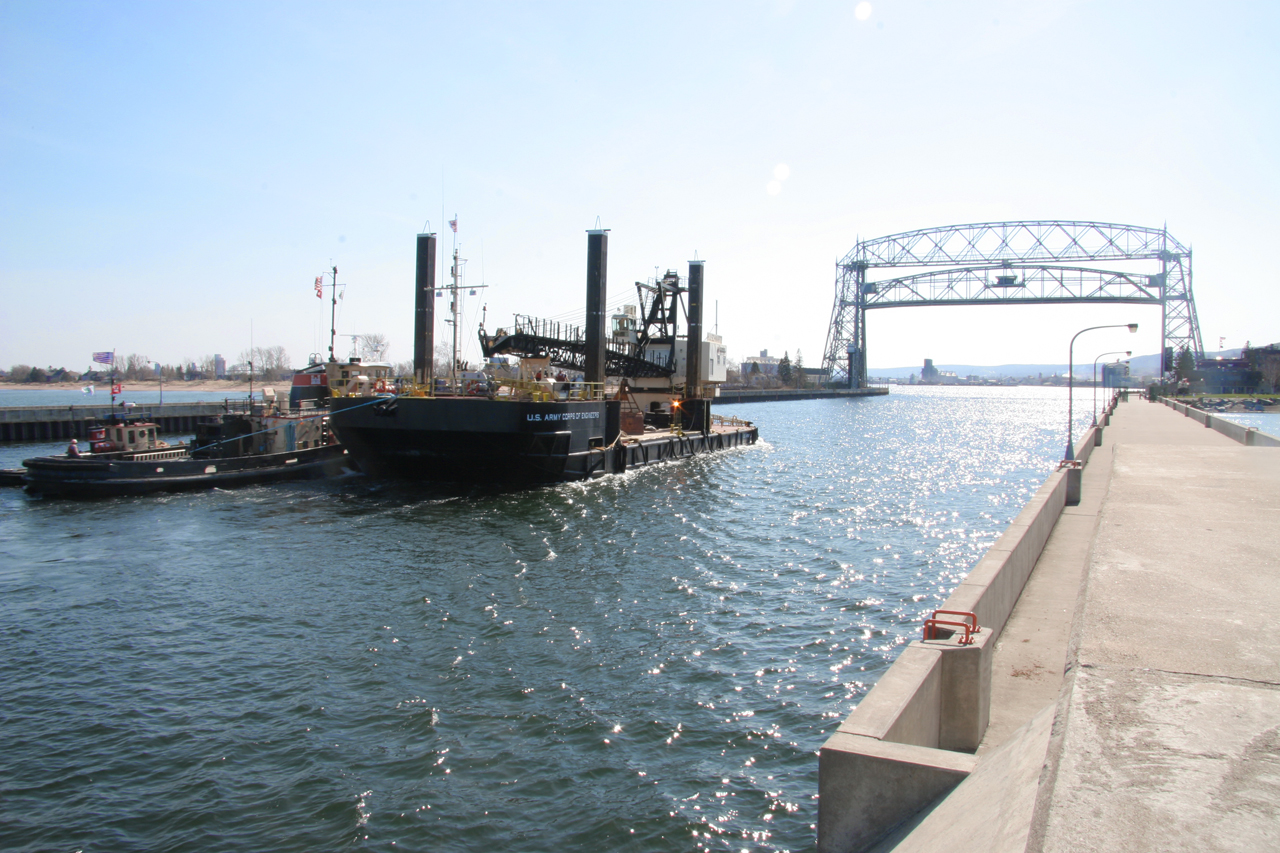
Ship canal

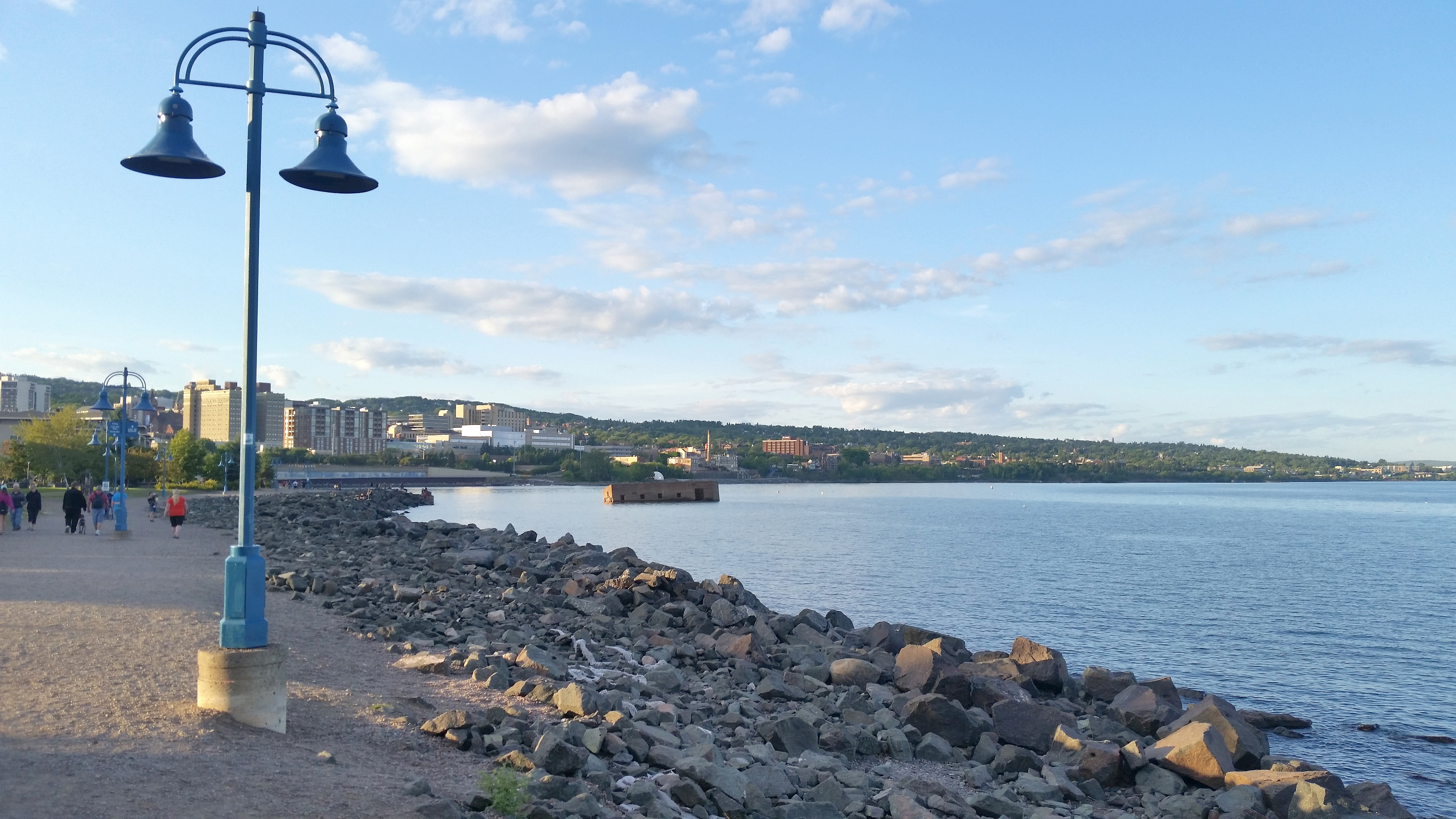
Lower North Shore from Canal Park

== See also ==
- Downtown Duluth (North)
- Duluth, Minnesota
- Park Point (South)
