= Minnesota State Highway 194 =

Highway in Minnesota

Trunk Highway 194
- Central Entrance; Mesaba Avenue
- MN 194 highlighted in red

Route information
- Maintained by MnDOT
- Length: 17.392 mi (27.990 km)
- Existed: April 22, 1933–present

Major junctions
- West end: US 2 in Solway Township
- US 53 in Hermantown; US 53 in Duluth
- East end: I-35 in downtown Duluth

Location
- Country: United States
- State: Minnesota
- Counties: St. Louis

Highway system
- Minnesota Trunk Highway System; Interstate; US; State; Legislative; Scenic
← MN 175	→ MN 197

Minnesota State Highway 194 (MN 194) is a 17.392-mile-long (27.990 km) highway in northeast Minnesota, which runs from its intersection with U.S. Highway 2 in Solway Township (near Hermantown) and continues east to its eastern terminus at its Mesaba Avenue interchange with Interstate Highway 35 in downtown Duluth. For part of its route, it runs together with U.S. Highway 53.

The route passes through the cities of Hermantown and Duluth.

Highway 194 is also known as Central Entrance and Mesaba Avenue within Duluth.

== Route description ==
State Highway 194 serves as an east–west arterial route between Solway Township, Hermantown, the Miller Hill area of Duluth, the Duluth Heights neighborhood, and downtown Duluth.

The highway is a spur route into the city of Duluth.

Highway 194 runs concurrent with U.S. Highway 53 for a 6-mile (9.7 km) stretch, from Lindahl Road in Hermantown to Trinity Road, near Duluth's Miller Hill Mall. This four-lane stretch of Highways 53 and 194 is also known as the Miller Trunk Highway in the cities of Duluth and Hermantown.

The Mesaba Avenue portion of Highway 194 offers an excellent view of the city of Duluth and Lake Superior.

== History ==
Highway 194 was authorized in 1933 and originally numbered State Highway 69. In 1935, this route was renumbered State Highway 94 when U.S. Highway 69 was extended into Minnesota from Iowa near Albert Lea.

The route was paved by 1940.

The route was renumbered again, to 194, c. 1959 to avoid duplication with Interstate Highway 94 that was being built in Minnesota during the early 1960s.

The section of present day State Highway 194 between U.S. 53 in Hermantown and downtown Duluth was authorized in 1933. The original alignment of this section was from U.S. 53 (Miller Trunk Highway) down Central Entrance to 6th Avenue East and then to Second and Third Streets in downtown Duluth (where it intersected then-Highway 61 as Second / Third Streets downtown). In 1991, the alignment of State Highway 194 on the Duluth hillside was changed from 6th Avenue East to Mesaba Avenue, southbound to Interstate 35. The section of Highway 61 that was signed on Second and Third Streets in downtown Duluth was eliminated at this time, due to the new I-35 extension around downtown Duluth completed in 1992.

== Major intersections ==
The entire route is in St. Louis County.

Location	mi	km	Destinations	Notes
Solway Township	0.000	0.000	US 2	
Solway Township	0.007	0.011	CR 46 (Saginaw Road)	
Solway Township	2.596	4.178	CR 98 (Canosia Road)	
Hermantown	6.610	10.638	CR 13 (Midway Road)	
Hermantown	7.638– 7.649	12.292– 12.310	US 53	West end of US 53 overlap
Hermantown			CR 48 north (Ugstad Road)	
Hermantown			CR 48 south (Lavaque Road)	
Hermantown			CR 17 (Stebner Road)	
Hermantown			CR 32 (Arrowhead Road)	
Hermantown–Duluth line			CR 91 (Haines Road)	
Duluth			CR 6 (Maple Grove Road)	
Duluth	13.569	21.837	US 53 (Trinity Road)	East end of US 53 overlap
Duluth	14.661	23.595	CR 90 (Arlington Avenue)	
Duluth	15.941	25.655	CR 4 north (Rice Lake Road), (Mesaba Avenue)	
Duluth	17.164– 17.381	27.623– 27.972	Superior Street (Michigan Street); I-35 / LSCT	Southbound exit and northbound entrance
1.000 mi = 1.609 km; 1.000 km = 0.621 mi: Concurrency terminus; Incomplete access
