= Downtown Duluth =

- Duluth Commercial Historic District
- U.S. National Register of Historic Places
- U.S. Historic district
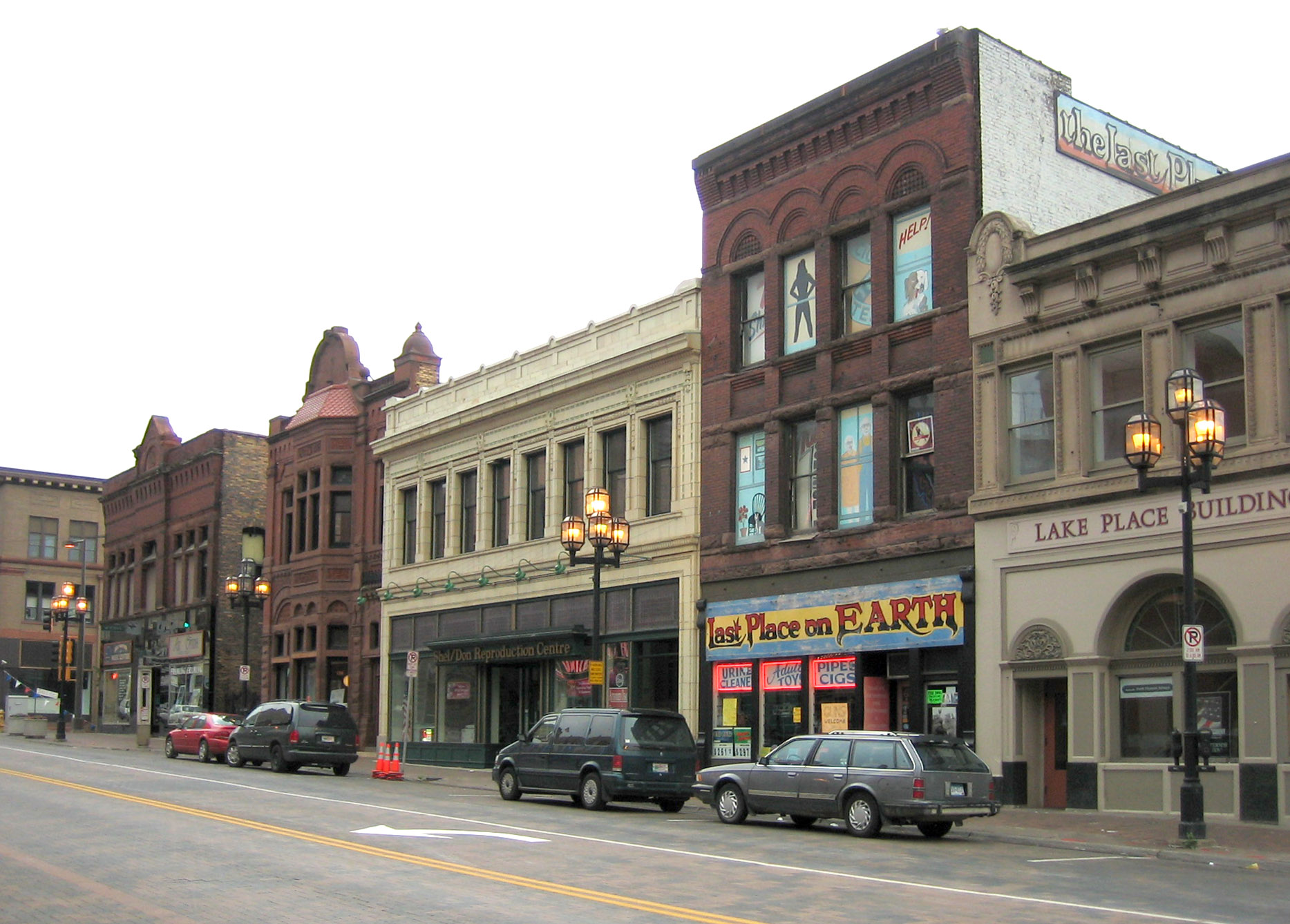
- The 100 block of East Superior Street

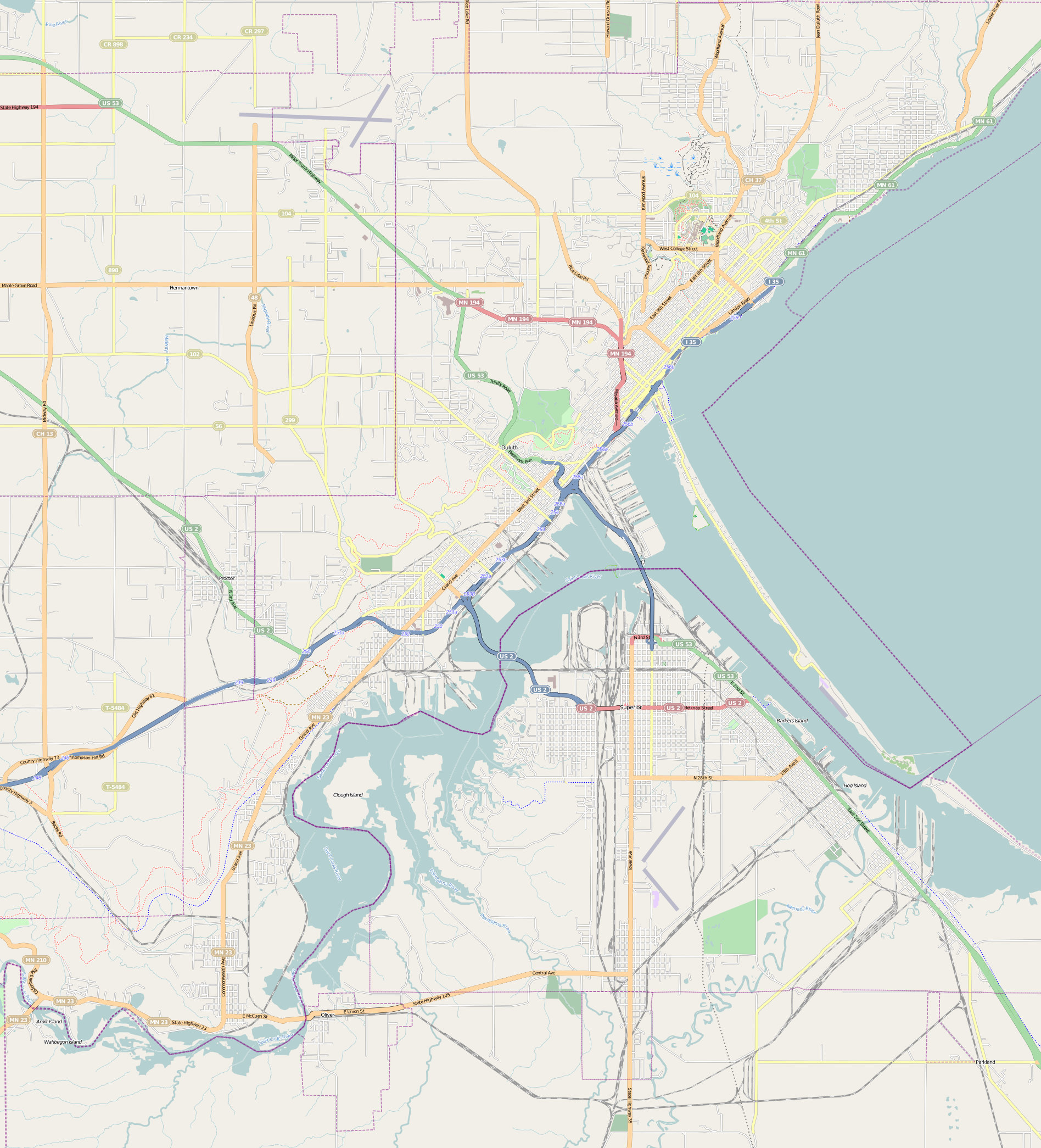
- Location within Duluth Location within Minnesota Location within the United States
- Location: Superior and 1st Streets between 4th Avenue West and 4th Avenue East, Duluth, Minnesota
- Coordinates: 46°47′14″N 92°5′56″W
- Area: 45 acres (18 ha)
- Built: 1872–1929
- Architect: William Hunt, Oliver G. Traphagen, John Wangenstein, George Wirth, et al.
- Architectural style: Neoclassical, Renaissance Revival, Richardsonian Romanesque, Romanesque Revival, Tudor Revival
- MPS: Duluth's Central Business District MPS
- NRHP reference No.: 06000455
- Added to NRHP: May 31, 2006

The downtown of Duluth, Minnesota, United States, is situated between Mesaba Avenue (Highway 194) and 4th Avenue East; and located on Michigan, Superior, First, Second, and Third streets.

The downtown area is home to a number of the city's cultural and social attractions, as well as government offices and business centers. Duluth's main library is located in downtown, as is the city's foremost museum, the courthouse, city hall, several local restaurants and bars with live music venues, and many of the larger business offices. Stores and places to eat and drink tend to be locally or regionally owned and operated, with most chain and franchise establishments having located (or re-located) themselves in the "Miller Hill area" around the Miller Trunk Corridor. A large portion of the eastern section of downtown is oriented around Essentia Health–St. Mary's Medical Center and Miller-Dwan Medical Center.

The downtown area is accessible from Interstate 35 as well as through transit service provided by Jefferson Lines and the Duluth Transit Authority. Most of the downtown is within walking distance of the touristy Canal Park district.

Five blocks along Superior Street and seven blocks along 1st Street West have been designated the Duluth Commercial Historic District, with 87 contributing properties built between 1872 and 1929. It was listed as a historic district on the National Register of Historic Places in 2006 for its state-level significance in the themes of architecture and commerce. It was nominated for representing Duluth's commercial development and popular architectural styles at the turn of the 20th century.

== Buildings ==
The downtown area contains a number of historical buildings, many of them dating to the city's peak days in the late 19th century and early 20th. These include the Historic Old Central High School (now the administrative offices of Duluth Public Schools), the NorShor Theatre, and the Duluth Depot (now a museum), among many others. Newly constructed ones are less common than older edifices, although some large newer buildings such as the Tech Village are present. Downtown Duluth is the home of Fond-du-Luth Casino.

== Streets ==
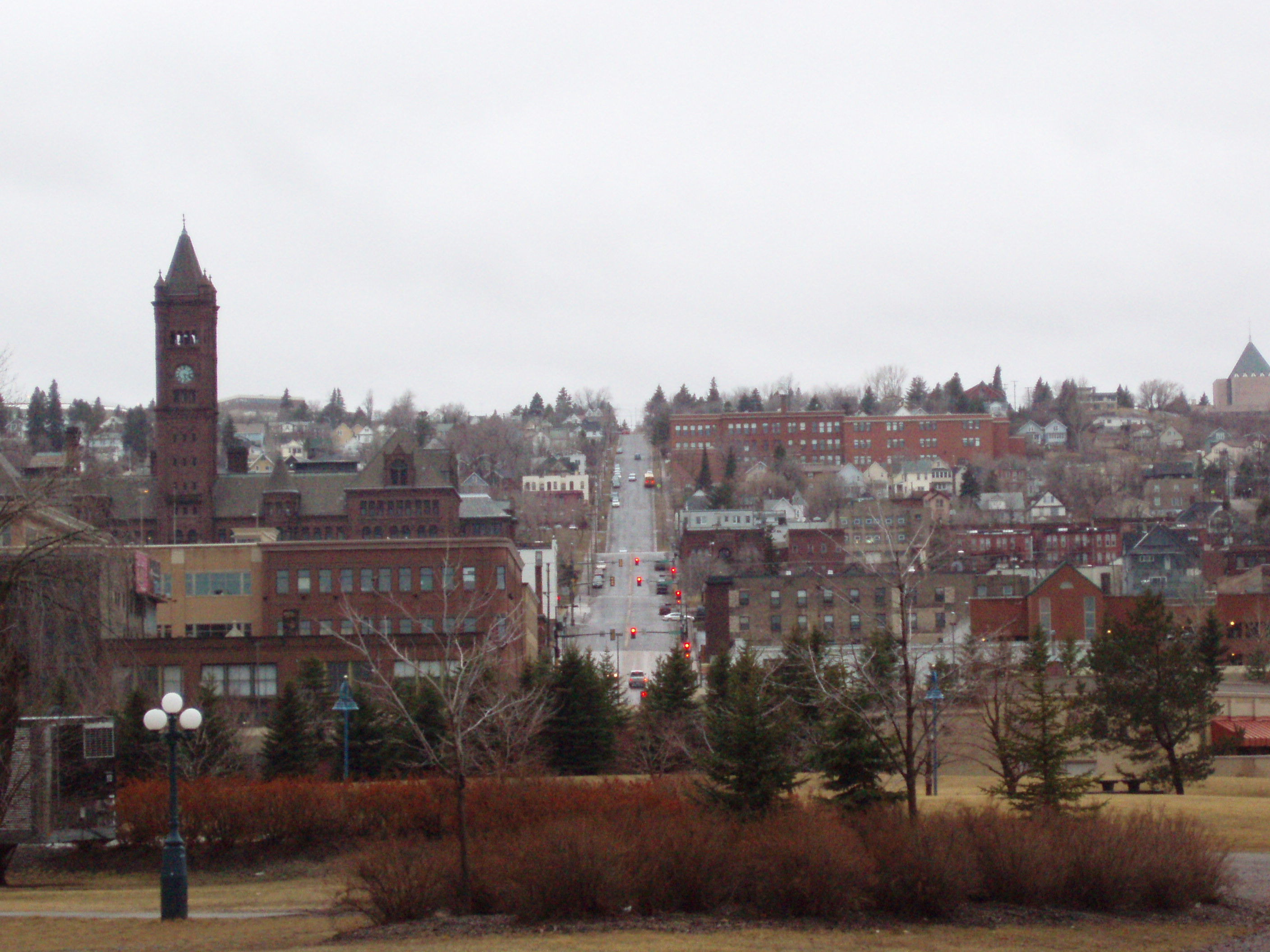
1st Avenue East rises 520 feet (160 m) in a one-mile climb up the hillside

Streets in Duluth's downtown area features dramatic upward slopes, a feature common to many of Duluth's neighborhoods due to the 800-foot (240 m) elevation difference between the shore and the hilltop.

As a part of a beautification project during Duluth's economic crisis of the 1980s, several blacktop streets were converted to brick. Along with this change came the introduction of "old-fashioned" ornamental streetlamps.

== Skywalk ==
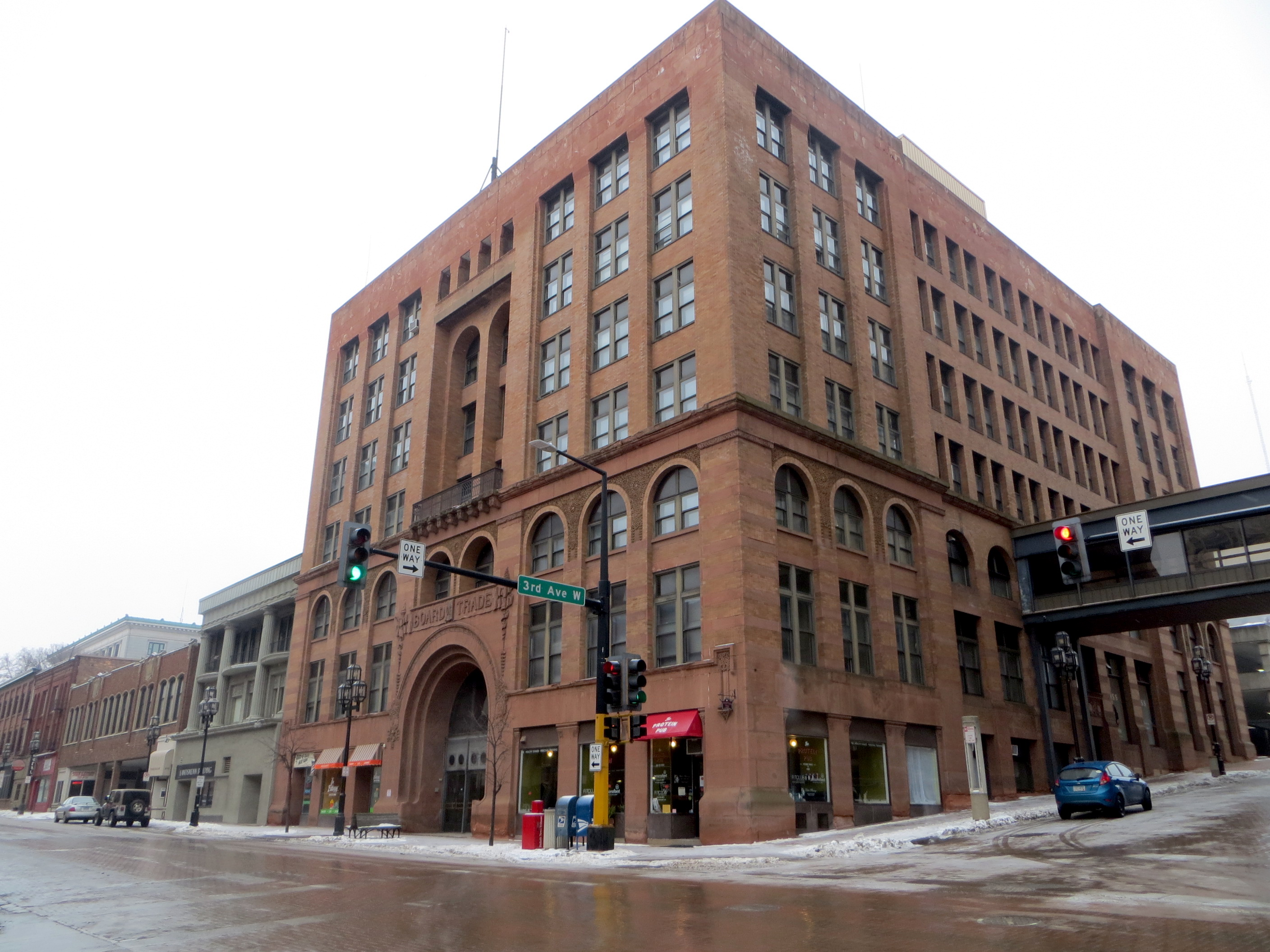
The Board of Trade building is a contributing property of the Duluth Commercial Historic District. A skywalk segment is seen at right.

Due to the city's cold winter temperatures (at times falling well below −20 °F (−29 °C)), a network of skywalks was constructed to provide indoor connectivity between most major buildings. The skywalk system is augmented by an over-the-freeway enclosed walkway leading to the Duluth Entertainment Convention Center (DECC) in the Canal Park district.

== See also ==
- Central Hillside (north and west)
- East Hillside (east)
- Lincoln Park (west)
- National Register of Historic Places listings in St. Louis County, Minnesota
