= Duluth Pack (company) =

- Type: Private
- Industry: Retail, fashion
- Founded: 1882; 144 years ago in Duluth, Minnesota, United States
- Founder: Camille Poirier
- Products: Canoe packs
- Owners: Kevin Hall & Partner
- Website: duluthpack.com

The Duluth Pack company is a manufacturer and supplier of canvas and leather packs and bags. They produce and sell a range of products, especially other bags and accessories built in the style of their original packs. The company grew out of the shoe repair business started by Camille Poirier in 1870. He patented the #3 Duluth pack in 1882 and later sold the canoe pack business to an outdoor supply store in downtown Duluth, Minnesota, where it is still located.

== History ==
The Duluth pack was invented by a French-Canadian named Camille Poirier, who went west to Duluth in 1870. Arriving with his "little stock of leather and tools", he began a small shoe store and quickly found success in what was then a booming frontier town. Out of his small shoe shop on the waterfront, Poirier began building a new style of canoe pack with a tumpline, sternum strap, and umbrella holder. He patented the design in 1882. The original #3 Duluth Packs have changed little since then, and came to be extensively used on wilderness canoe camping trips, giving prominence to both the name of the pack and the company. In 1911, Poirier sold off the canoe pack business to Duluth Tent and Awning on West Superior Street in downtown Duluth. In the 1920s, as America began its love affair with the automobile and auto camping became all the rage, Duluth Pack built "auto packs" that would clamp to the running boards of the car to hold extra gear. In some ways these were forerunners of RVs. The company has since grown globally and started joint ventures with Barney's in New York, Urban Outfitters, and other prominent companies.

== Change in ownership ==
In early 2025, Duluth Pack was sold to Kevin Hall and a business partner. The group announced plans to carry on Duluth Pack's legacy and keep the brand in Duluth, Minnesota while continuing to honor the brand's core values. A press release sent out by the company stated, in part, “The pair cares deeply about the brand’s future, its customers, its hardworking employees, and the Duluth community.”.

== Locations and operations ==
The single Duluth Pack store is located at 365 Canal Park Drive in Canal Park, Duluth. Duluth Pack also sells its products online and through a wide network of dealers around the world.

== Products ==
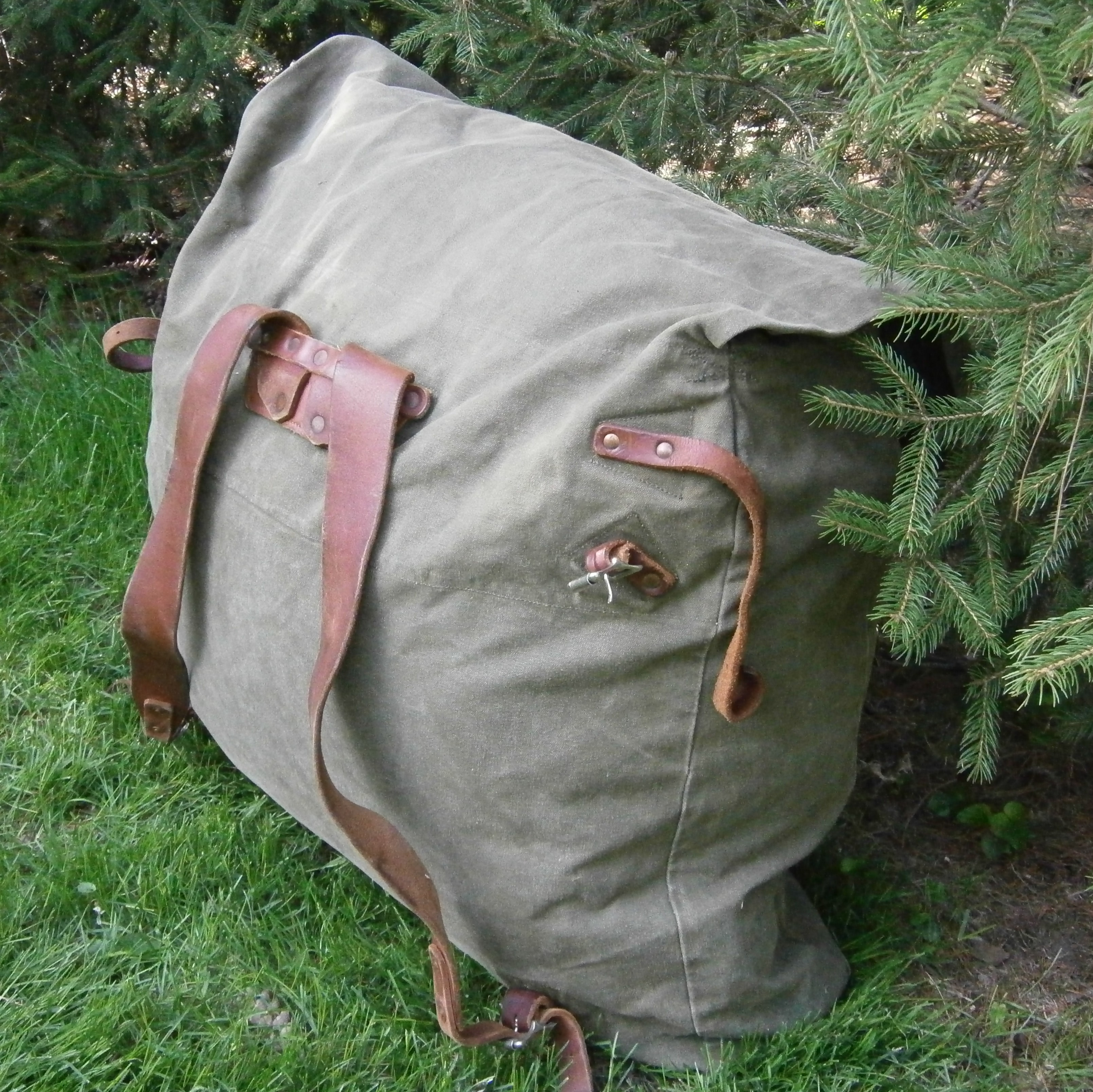
Number 4 Duluth pack

=== Duluth Pack ===
A Duluth Pack is a traditional portage pack used in canoe travel, particularly in the Boundary Waters region of northern Minnesota and the Quetico Provincial Park of Ontario. A specialized type of backpack, Duluth Packs are made of heavy canvas and leather, and are nearly square in order to fit easily in the bottom of a canoe. The typical Duluth Pack consists of a single large envelope that is closed by leather straps and roller buckles rather than a zipper. Larger sizes, such as #4, have a "set-out" and so are box-shaped rather than envelope-shaped. The pack is carried by two shoulder straps, and sometimes a tumpline worn over the top of the head. They are made in several sizes, traditionally referred to by numbers.

Their canoe pack's key attributes make them well adapted to wilderness camping where travel is largely by water (where the packs and gear do not need to be carried) punctuated by portages where the packs and gear need to be carried over land:

- They are generally larger than other packs, accommodating a quantity of gear. Canoe camping typically involves carrying more and heavier gear than, for example, backpacking.
- They must be built strong, carrying heavy loads even when exposure to the elements can weaken pack materials, especially by water saturation.
- Their shape accommodates large volumes while remaining compact, and their design has few protuberances. This allows better fitting into canoes, less snagging during loading and unloading, and packing lower in canoes to lower the center of gravity to enhance stability.
- They are not tall above the wearer's shoulders (as backpacking packs typically are), allowing the wearer to also carry a canoe.
- Some have a tumpline, which assists weight distribution with heavy loads.

=== Other products ===
The woodsmen and women of the 1940s and 1950s needed a pack they could take into the trees, but that would not snag on branches like the canoe pack. The Cruiser Pack was created to fulfill this requirement. These packs were narrower, but still as tough as a canoe pack, and they could travel more easily between the trees. The 1960s and 1970s saw the entry of the age of air travel and the need for durable luggage. While Duluth Pack had been building luggage for Gokey's and Orvis since the 1950s, a new line of sportsman's duffels was introduced and became popular. The most recent redesigns to the venerable pack have included padded laptop sleeves.

The rugged canvas and leather style of duluth Packs has become fashionable, and the company manufactures and markets a range of other products, such as purses, briefcases, duffel bags, totes, gun cases, & other hunting, camping, or hiking gear made in the same classic, handcrafted style. They now offer materials such as waxed canvas, cowhide leather, bison leather, wool, & more in addition to the traditional canvas style carried since 1882.

Duluth Pack also manufactures American Heritage products such as purses, briefcases, backpacks, iPad cases, luggage, gun cases, and a variety of accessory items. In addition to the traditional canvas and leather, there are new product lines using Faribault Woolen Mills wool, Woolrich wool, and American bison leather grown in North Dakota and tanned in St. Paul, Minnesota. In addition to products produced in their 15 standard colors, they have a line of camouflage bags and accessories using Mossy Oak New Break Up canvas.

== Trademark ==
The company has been headquartered at its present location for over 120 years and later changed the name it operates under to Duluth Pack.
