= Duluth pack =

Specialized backpack used in canoe travel

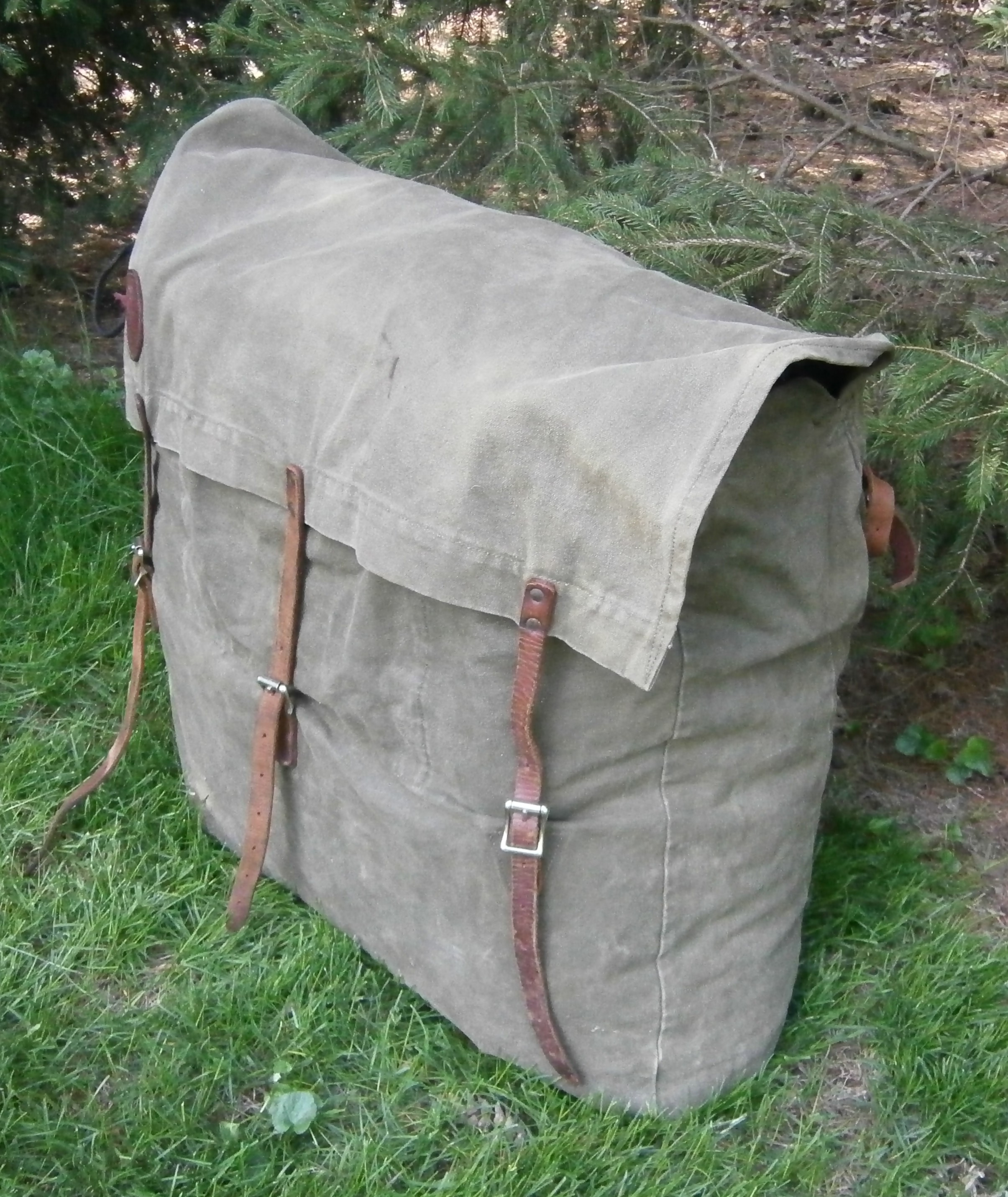
Canvas and leather pack produced by Duluth Pack. Their #4 has a "set out" and so is box-shaped.

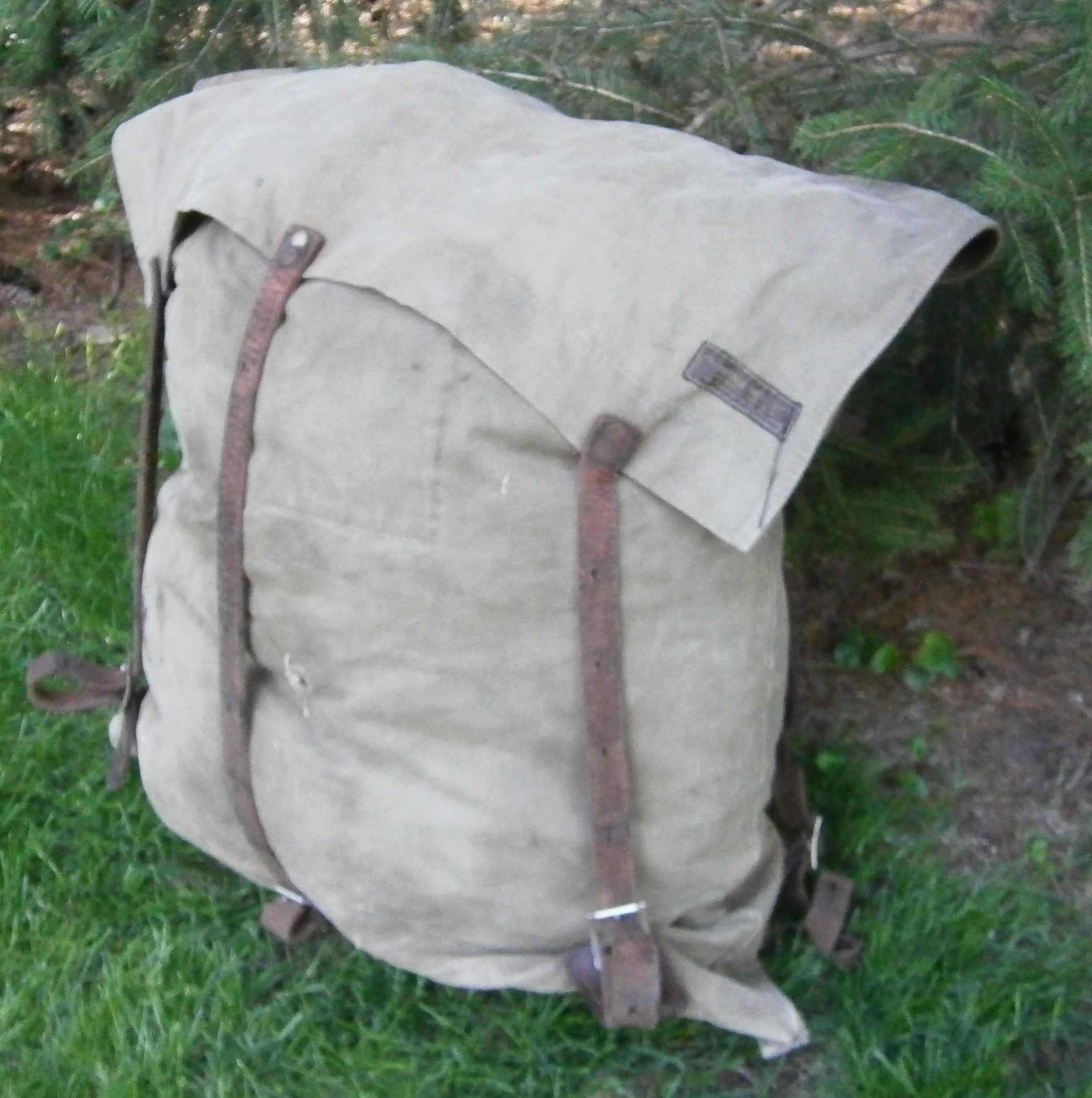
The #3 canvas and leather pack is produced by Duluth Pack and is envelope-shaped.

A Duluth pack or Poirier pack is a traditional portage pack used in canoe travel, particularly in the Boundary Waters region of northern Minnesota and the Quetico Provincial Park of Ontario. It is a specialized type of backpack that is designed to fit in the bottom of canoes. Originally known as the "Poirier pack" or "Poirier pack-sack" (for its inventor, Camille Poirier), the pack style later became known as the "Duluth pack", as its original, eponymous manufacturing company is located in Duluth, Minnesota.

== Description ==
A Duluth pack is a specialized type of backpack made of heavy canvas, leather, and/or cordura nylon. The packs are a traditional portage pack which are nearly square in order to fit easily in the bottom of a canoe. The simplest and most traditional Duluth pack comprises a single large envelope which is closed by straps and roller buckles. The pack is carried by two shoulder straps, and sometimes a tumpline worn over the top of the head.

== History ==
The pack has its origins in an innovative nineteenth-century French-Canadian shoemaker named Camille Poirier, who made his way west to Duluth, Minnesota, Arriving in 1870 with his "little stock of leather and tools." He began a small shoe store on the shores of Lake Superior, and quickly made a go of it in the booming frontier town. Out of his small shoe shop on the waterfront, Camille began building a new style canoe pack with a tumpline, sternum strap, and umbrella holder. He patented the "C. Poirier Pack Sack" strap design in 1882. In 1911, Poirier sold his business to Duluth Tent & Awning Company, which later became the Duluth Pack company. It became common to refer any pack made in this style as a "Duluth pack". Listings of this style of pack by other organizations often refer to them as portage packs or canoe packs.

== Features ==
Their key attributes make them well adapted to wilderness canoe camping where travel is largely by water—where the packs and gear do not need to be carried—punctuated by portages—where the packs and gear need to be carried over land:

- They are generally larger than other packs, accommodating a larger quantity of gear. Canoe camping typically involves carrying more and heavier gear than, for example, backpacking.
- They must be built strong, carrying heavy loads even when exposure to the elements can weaken certain pack materials (such as by saturation of leather).
- Their shape accommodates large volumes while remaining compact, and their design has few protuberances. This allows better fitting into canoes, less snagging during loading and unloading, less "catching" of the wind when traveling, and packing lower in canoes (thus lowering the center of gravity to enhance canoe stability).
- They are not tall above the wearer's shoulders (such as typical backpacks) allowing the wearer to also carry a canoe.
- Some have a tumpline which assists with weight distribution with heavy loads.
