= Sillero =

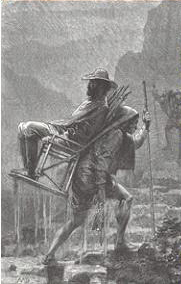
"The Ascent of Agony" Engraving by Maillard published in 1879 after a sketch by Edouard Andre depicting the crossing of the Quindio pass by silleros using tumplines

The silleros, cargueros or silleteros (also called saddle-men) were the porters used to carry people and their belongings through routes impossible by horse carriage. A famous example is the use of silleros by colonial officials to be carried across the Quindio pass in the Colombian Andes.

== History ==
Silleros often carried between 100 and 200 pounds (50 and 90 kg) of weight crossing the Quindio pass, considered the most difficult of the northern Andean passes. Besides their baggage, silleros even carried the travelers, such as colonial officials or explorers, in a wickerwork chair mounted on their backs.

The practice was described by Alexander von Humboldt, who crossed the Quindio in 1801 – he refused to be carried and preferred walking. Humboldt noted that porters were generally mestizo or whites, while others have stated that they were most often Indigenous. The contemporary descriptions often referred to the mode of transportation as a lomo de indio (on Indian back).

Another traveler who described the practice was Captain Charles Cochrane of the British Navy, who criticized the infrastructure of Colombia and, as Humboldt did, refused to mount silleros. He wrote that "I have been told that the Spaniards and the natives mount these chairmen with as much sang froid as if they were getting on the back of mules, and some brutal wretches have not hesitated to spur the flanks of these poor unfortunate men when they fancied they were not going fast enough". Cochrane also noted that the 300 silleros of Ibagué rarely lived past the age of 40 and that a leading cause of death was the bursting of a blood vessel or pulmonary problems.

According to nineteenth-century anecdotes, sometimes, when hired by particularly demanding or demeaning masters, the Indian porters would tire from the heavy burdens put upon them and eventually, would throw their riders into the abyss and escape into the forest.

In his work Shamanism, Colonialism, and the Wild Man, anthropologist Michael Taussig describes the practice of using silleros to cross the Andes as part of the colonial tendency to see and treat the indigenous people as subhuman wild creatures.

== Today ==
In parts of Andean Colombia, such as Antioquia, the silletero still exists and is considered an important part of the cultural heritage of the area, although now, they only carry goods, not passengers.

The city of Medellín holds an annual Festival of the Flowers every summer. One of its main events is a parade of silleteros who carry silletas filled with artistically-designed floral arrangements.

== Gallery ==
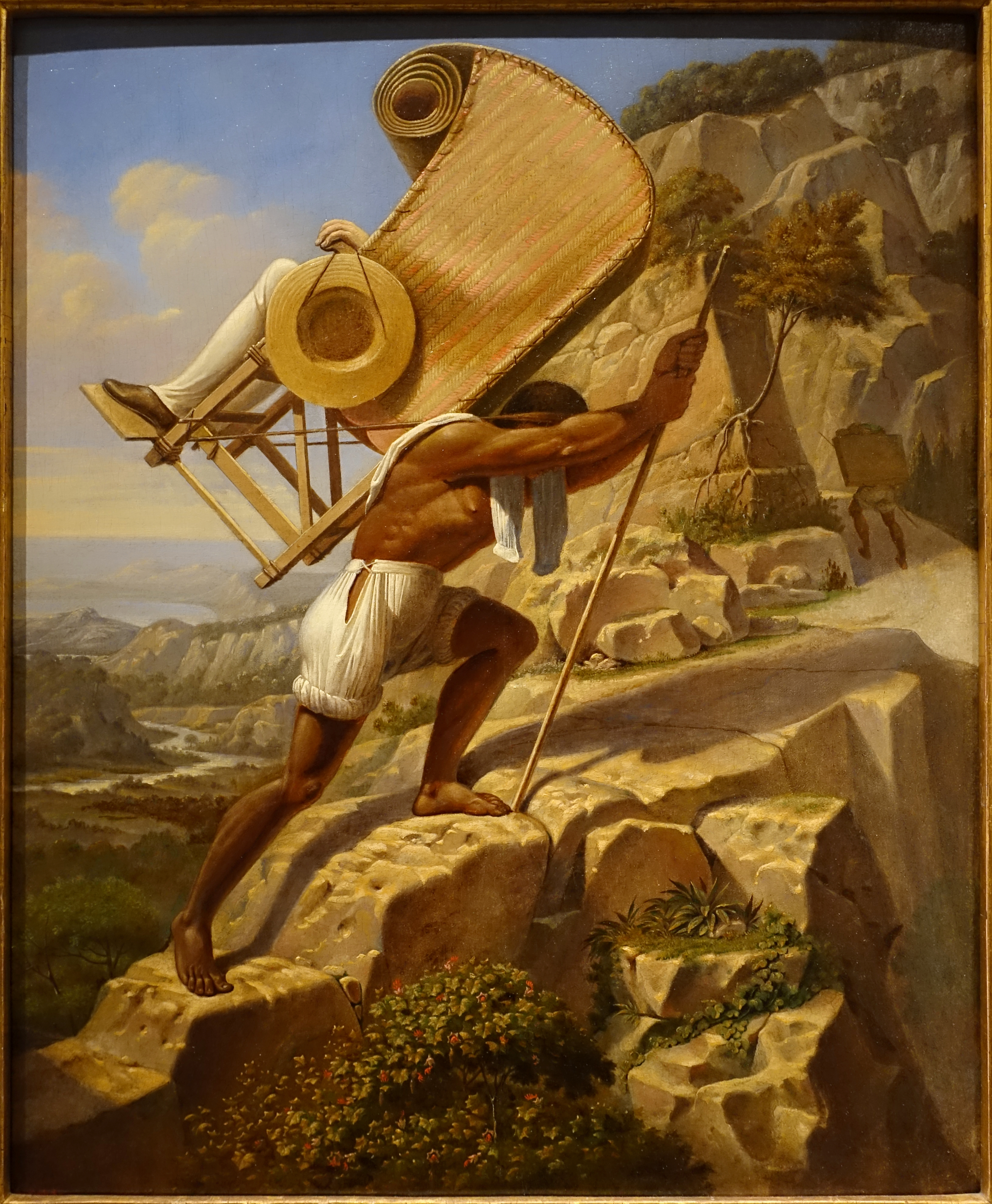
The artist carried in a sillero over the Chiapas from Palenque to Ocosingo, Mexico, by Jean-Frédéric Waldeck, c. 1833

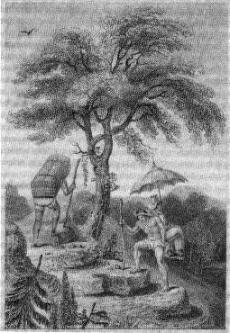
Image of travellers being carried across the mountains by silleros, taken from the 1884 work "Viajes por el interior de las provincias de Colombia" by John Potter Hamilton

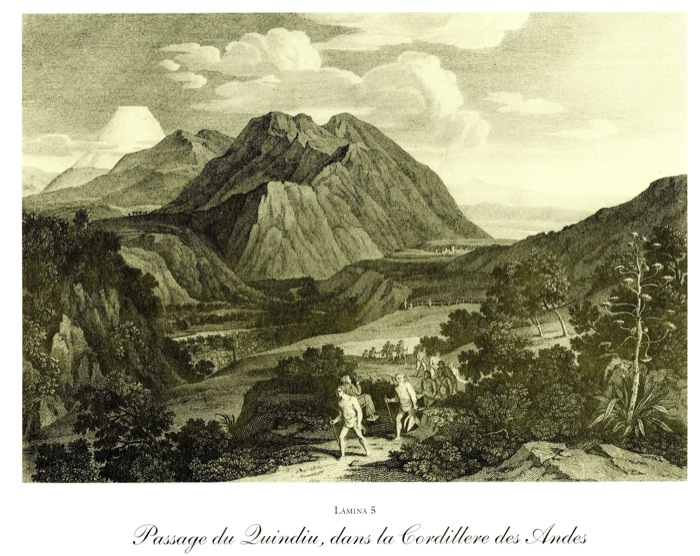
Alexander von Humboldt's depiction of the Quindio pass and the silleros, drawn in 1801

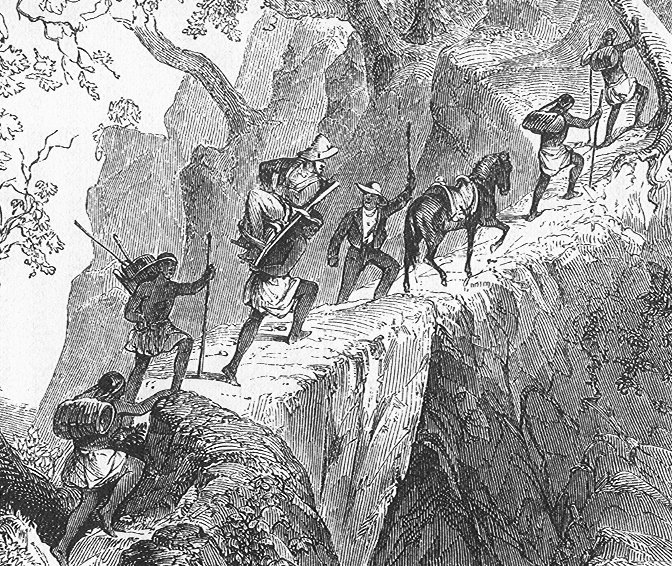
Traveling By Silla, by Frederick Catherwood. Scene in Chiapas. Engraving from 1841 book, "Incidents of Travel in Central America, Chiapas, and Yucatan" by John Lloyd Stephens.

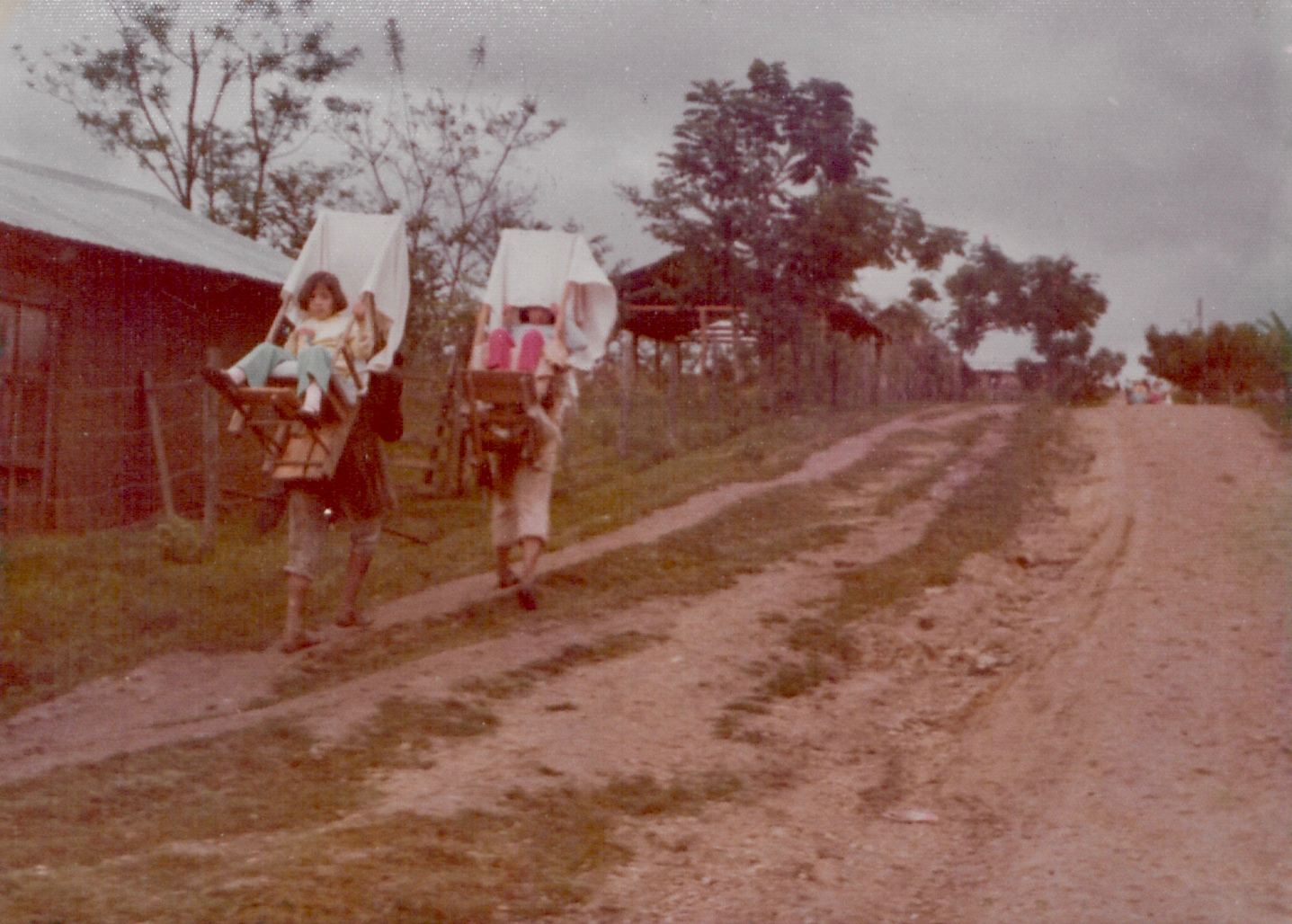
Children riding in sillas in Chiapas, 1978.

== See also ==
- Litter (vehicle), a device in which a person is carried by a bearer ("porter" or "chairman")
- Human-powered transport
- Sherpas, people of the Himalayas known for their mountaineering expertise
