= Festival of the Flowers =

Festival in Medellín, Colombia

Festival of the Flowers Feria de las Flores
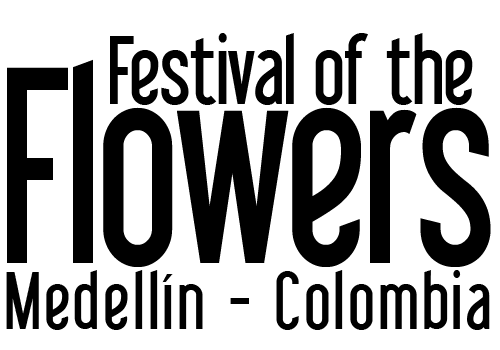

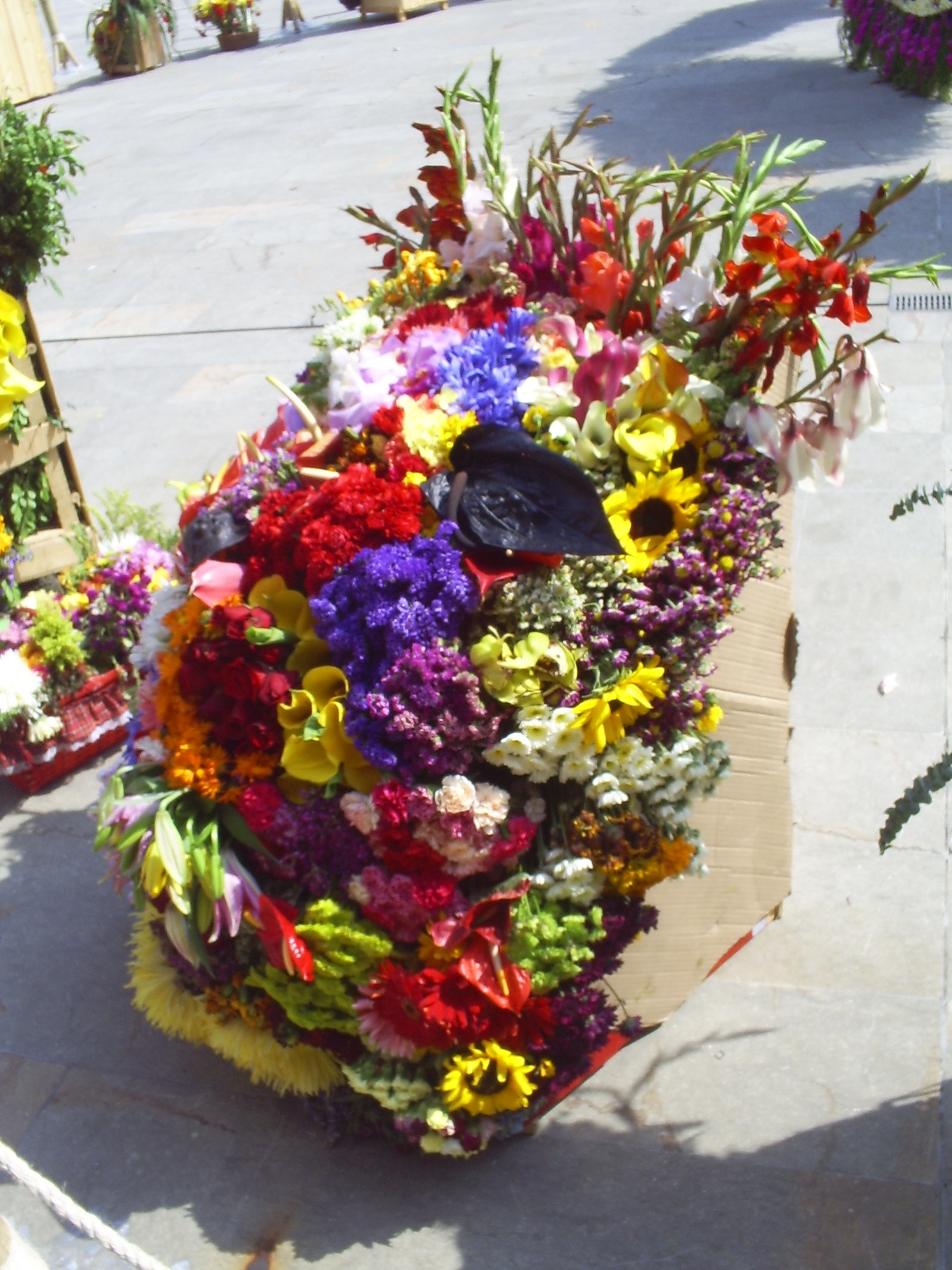
- Status: Active
- Genre: Cultural festival
- Frequency: Annually
- Location: Medellín
- Country: Colombia
- Inaugurated: 1963
- Website: feriadelasfloresmedellin.gov.co

The Flowers Festival (Spanish: Feria de las Flores) is a festival that takes place in Medellín, Colombia. The annual festival is a significant driver of tourism and holds importance to the cultural fabric of the city. In addition to various flower display-oriented events and contests, the festival includes musical performances, an antique car parade, and an 11km bike ride. It is estimated that the Flowers Festival annually attracts more than two million people to the city, and the event cost the city around $3.6 million to organize in 2019.

== History ==
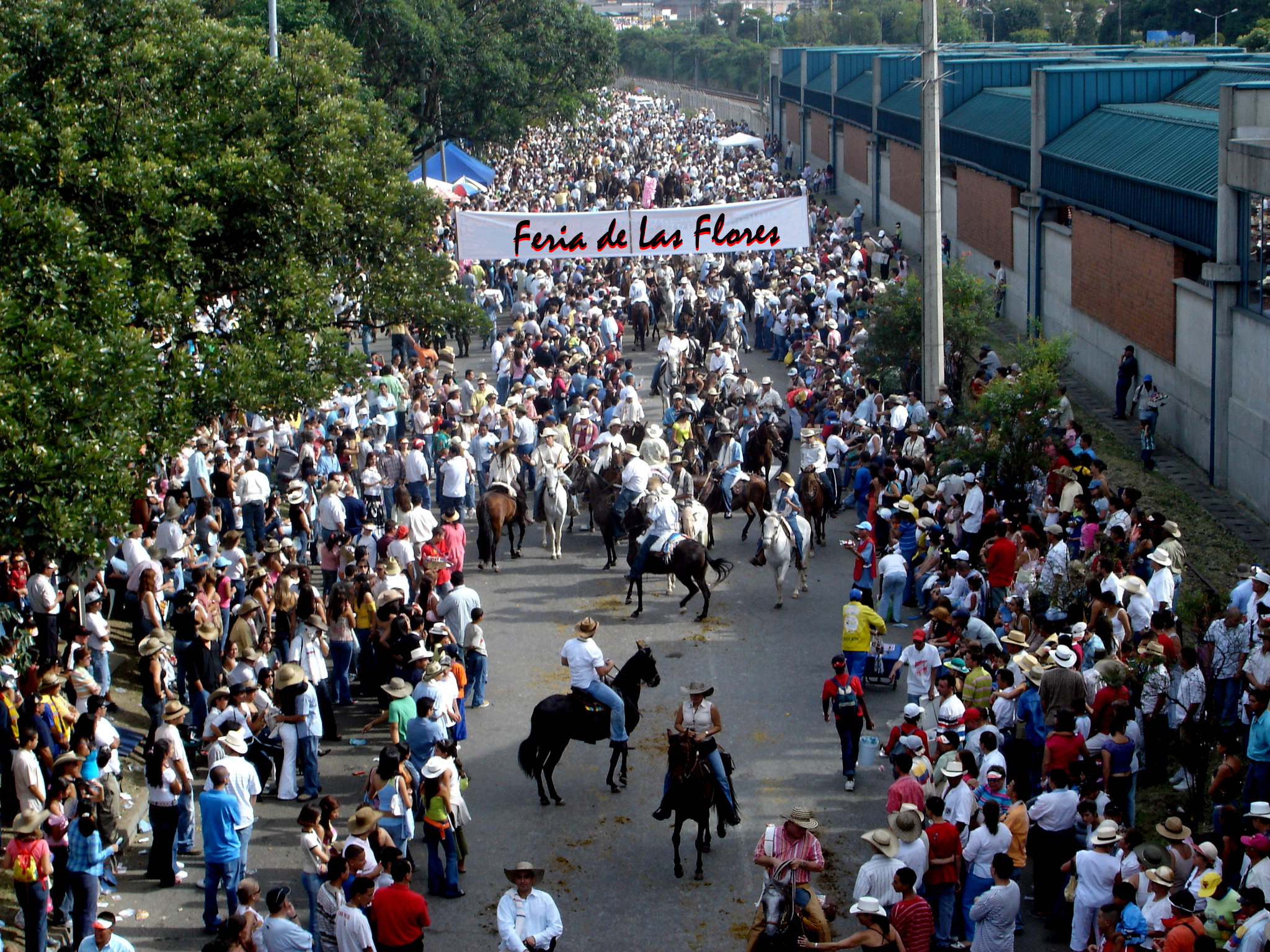
the Paso Fino cavalcade

The first Flowers Festival took place on May 1, 1957. It was organized by Arturo Uribe, a member of the Board of the Office of Development and Tourism in Medellin, Colombia. The festival lasted for five days with an exposition of flowers displayed in the Metropolitan Cathedral, which was organized by the Gardening Club of Medellín and monsignor Tulio Botero to celebrate the Virgin Mary day. This flower parade represents the end of slavery when slaves carried men and women on their backs up steep hills instead of flowers. The first silleteros parade also took place with some 40 men from the corregimiento of Santa Elena carrying on their backs flower arrangements to the exposition site.

This festival initially took place during the month of May but was changed to August in 1958 to celebrate the independence of Antioquia. Since then, other events have been added like the "International Pageant of the Flowers", the cavalcade, Guinness Records in 1996 and 1999, classic automobiles parade, Orchids exposition, among others.

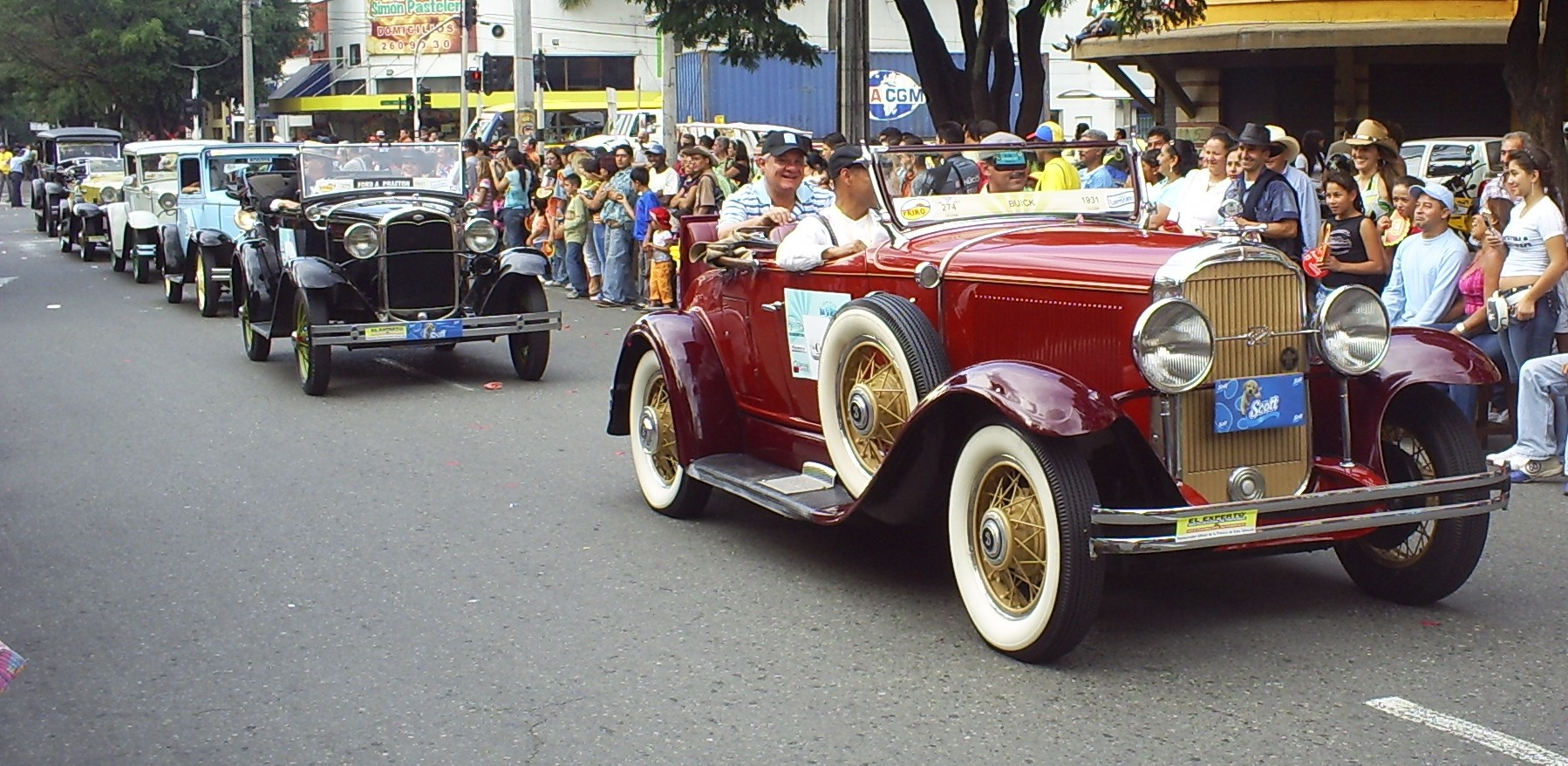
Old and Classic automobile parade

== Types of Silletas ==
- The Traditional Silleta: It is an icon that represents the old silletas used by peasants to transport their products. It usually measures 80-90 centimeters and they can carry up to 50 kilos flowers on it.
- The Emblematic Silleta: The design can be flat or three-dimensional and they seek to bring civic, educational or religious messages to the population.
- The Monumental Silleta: They are the largest silletas, reaching up to 2 x 2 meters. In this category, creativity has no limits as they constitute true works of art. Shapes, colors, and textures are mixed.
- The Commercial Silleta: They are authentic mobile advertising pieces, sponsored by companies that want to participate in the parade.

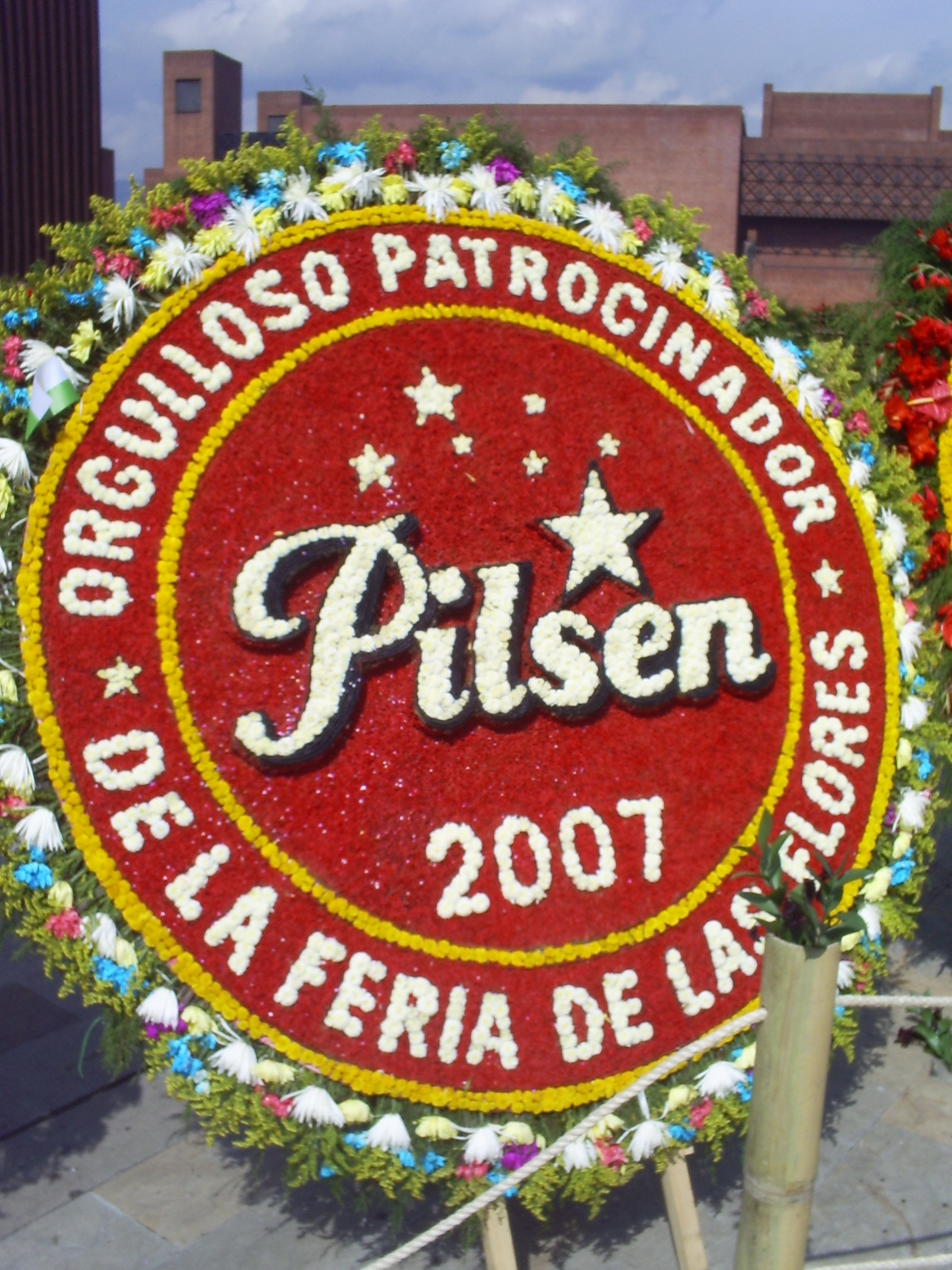
A Commercial Silleta

== Regional Significance ==
=== Religion ===
The Flowers Festival has roots in local Christian tradition. Though Colombia does not have an official religion, Roman Catholicism is the dominant faith and deeply culturally prevalent. At the beginning of the 20th century, in the month of May with the arrival of spring, it was common for homes and altars of churches to be decorated with native flowers in honor of the Virgin Mary. In 2017, the Pope, the head of the Catholic church, was met with over a million visitors on his visit to the city.

=== Industry ===
The production and export of flowers in the region employs thousands of workers. More than 235,000 tons of flowers are exported amongst 1600 different species, with a value of approximately $279 million.

== 2006 Festival ==
In 1999, the festival reached 482 silleteros participants. The 2006 edition also featured a new category of silleteros. Maria Isabel Lopez, spokeswoman for the Convention Center Bureau of Madrid, described this new category: "these are the Pioneers, who will show all their Silletas making experience, but will not participate in the contest." Some 50 peasants carried the silletas; 260 featuring traditional arrangements, 50 brandishing advertisements and 28 from the new Pioneer category. Keeping with tradition, the Mayor of Medellín sponsored the awards of the contest. In 2006, there were a total of 260 awards, selected and given by three juries.

== Current Events of the Feria de las Flores ==
Over the years, this quintessential Antioquian celebration has expanded to include a wide variety of events that have increased its importance and impact, such as the Desfile de Silleteros (Silleteros Parade)—the festival’s central event—the Classic and Antique Car Parade, the exhibition called Orchids, Birds, and Flowers, and the Tablados (cultural stages), among others.

Activities for All Tastes

The fair offers activities for all preferences and at all hours of the day, though the most intense celebrations take place at night.

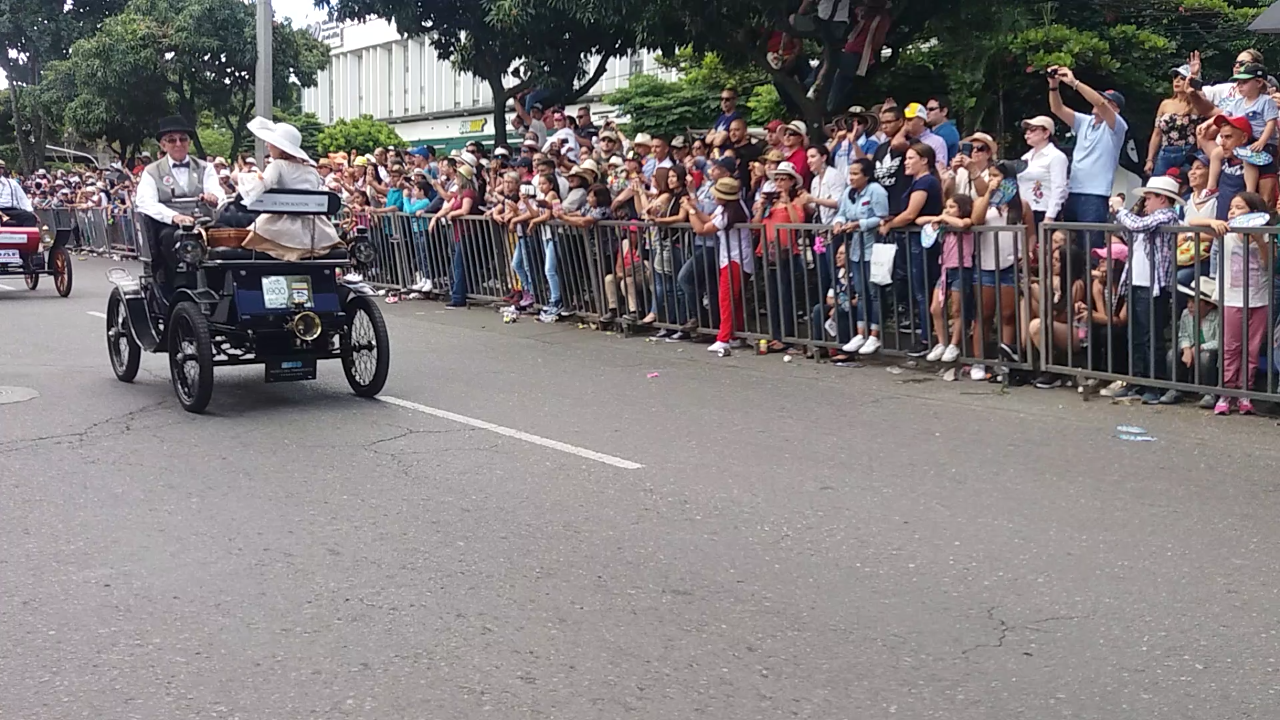
1899 De Dion Bouton model; led the Classic and Antique Car Parade at the 2017 Medellín Flower Festival.

During the Feria de las Flores, the Medellín City Government provides free access to:

- Silleteros Parade: Over 500 silleteros (flower carriers) showcase their floral creations in different categories. Location: Guayabal Avenue.
- Classic and Antique Car Parade: Over 200 iconic cars from national and global history. Location: Las Vegas Avenue, Guayabal Avenue, 30th Street.
- National Trova Festival: A showcase of Antioquian humor, featuring over 220 competing troubadours. Location: Park of Wishes.
- Nocturnal Cultural Park: Concert venue hosting a diverse lineup of local, national, and international artists. Location: Gardel Plaza.
- Flower Plaza: The fair’s central hub. A family-friendly plaza displaying Paisa culture through gastronomy, music, crafts, games, and more. Location: Ciudad del Río and Parque Norte.
- Flower Festival Bike Ride: A cycling parade through Medellín’s streets to promote bicycle use, with categories like "Flowers," "Work by Bike," "Classic Bikes," "Institutional," and "Famous Characters." Over 3,000 citizens participate.
- Flower Concert: A space for young people to experience the festival their way, featuring artists from the world’s most prestigious music festivals. Location: Obelisco.
- Artistic and Cultural Stages (Tablados): Music reaches neighborhoods and townships across the city.
- Sound Zone: A family-oriented space. Location: Parque Norte.

Other private events:

- Metro Concert.
- Antique Fair.
- Equine Fair.
- "Feria de las Flores" Musical Marching Band Competition.
- Orchid, Bird, and Flower Exhibition at the Orquideograma in the Botanical Garden.
- Popular Music Stages.
- Caravan of Chivas (traditional decorated trucks) and Flowers.

The entertainment offered by Medellín during the fair includes all types of environments, with diverse venues for daytime or nighttime fun. Recommended spots include Parque Lleras, the Zona Rosa, the Gardeliana Museum House for tango shows, neighborhood stages (tablados), and other points of interest detailed by travel agencies, tourism offices, or hotels in the city.
