= Canoe pack =

Type of backpack designed for portages

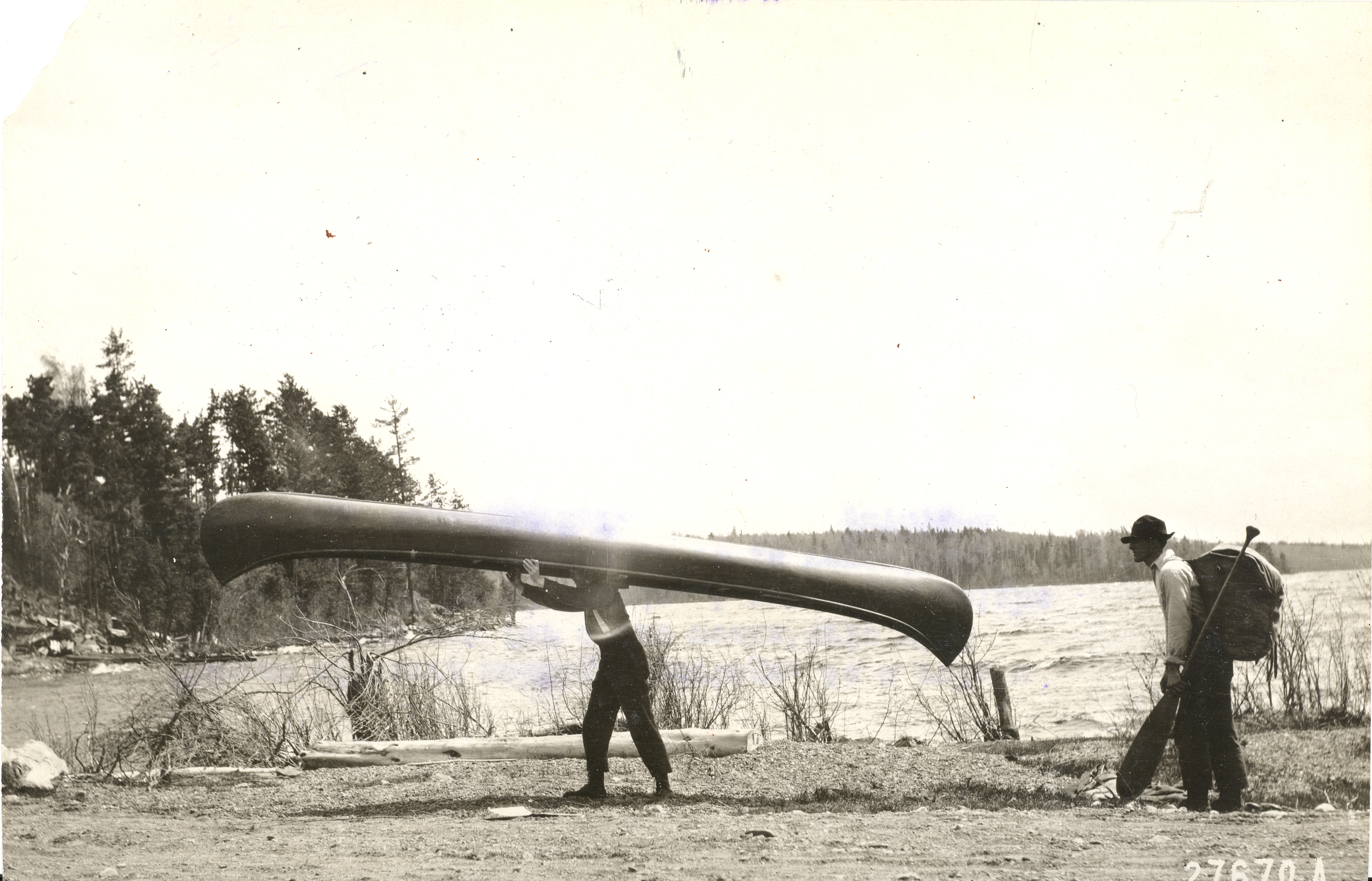
Portaging with a canvas pack

A canoe pack, also known as a portage pack, is a specialized type of backpack used primarily where travel is largely by water punctuated by portages where the gear needs to be carried over land.

When worn, a canoe pack must ride below the level of the shoulders in order to accommodate the wearer also carrying a canoe. Their shallow stature typically has a lower center of gravity than a normal hiking backpack, making storage in a canoe more stable.

== Information ==
A typical pack weight while portaging was 160–200 pounds (73–91 kg) during the North American fur trade era. In order to support the heavy load of the pack(s), canoe packs are sometimes used in conjunction with a "tumpline" or "portage collar," a strap attached to the pack and placed over the top of the head. Portage packs lack many features of long-distance hiking backpacks, and so are generally not used for such.

== Styles ==
- traditional canvas or Duluth pack
- nylon pack
- pack basket
- barrel
