= Tumpline =

Strap placed over the top of the head for carrying luggage

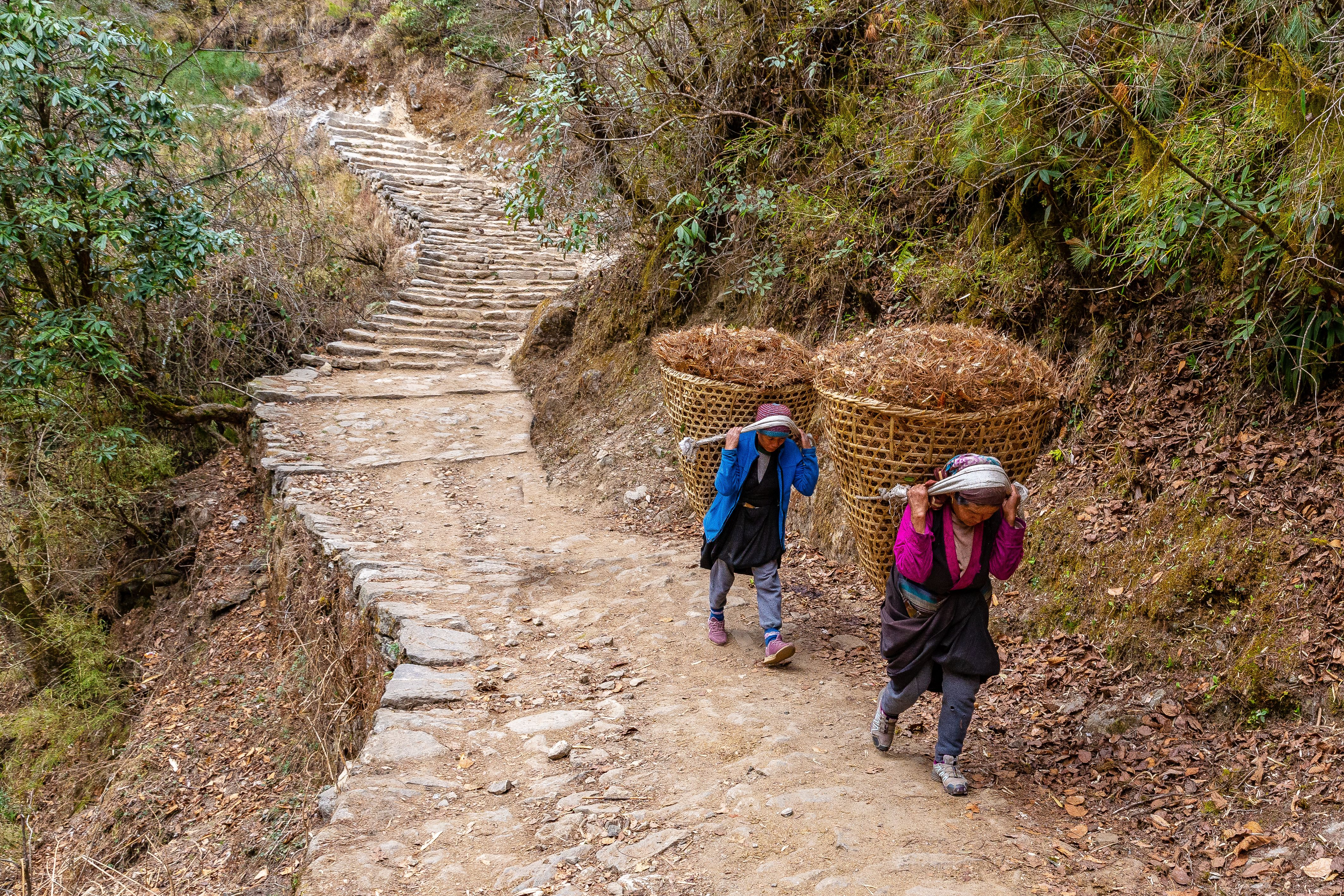
Two Nepalese women carrying large baskets filled with straw on a rural mountain trail using tumplines.

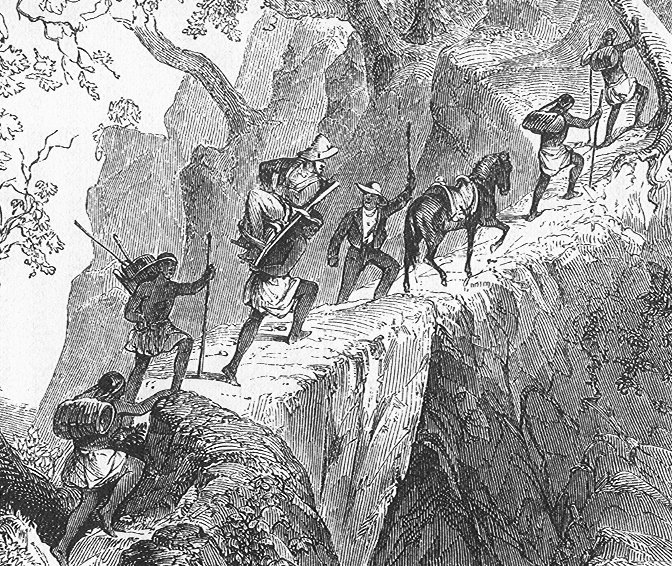
Tumplines in use in Mexico by silleros

A tumpline (/ˈtʌmplaɪn/) is a strap attached at both ends to a sack, backpack, or other luggage and used to carry the object by placing the strap over the top of the head. This utilizes the spine rather than the shoulders as standard backpack straps do. Tumplines are not intended to be worn over the forehead, but rather over the top of the head just back from the hairline, pulling straight down in alignment with the spine. The bearer then leans forward, allowing the back to help support the load.

The indigenous natives in Mexico (and other Latin American countries) traditionally have used the tumpline for carrying heavy loads, such as firewood, baskets (including baskets loaded with construction materials and dirt for building), bird cages, and furniture. In Mexico a common name for tumpline is "mecapal". Modern highland Mayans of southern Mexico use tumplines for various pedestrian transport. During World War Two, the Canadian Army developed special supply-packs with tumplines for moving supplies over rough terrain.

Tumplines are used commonly by porters in Nepal. Climber and outdoor equipment manufacturer Yvon Chouinard started using tumplines in preference to a backpack to solve chronic back pains after seeing how Nepalese porters developed muscles down the sides of their spinal columns.

== See also ==
- Duluth pack
- Head-carrying
- Matki (earthen pot)
- Portage
