= Portage =

Practice of carrying water craft or cargo over land

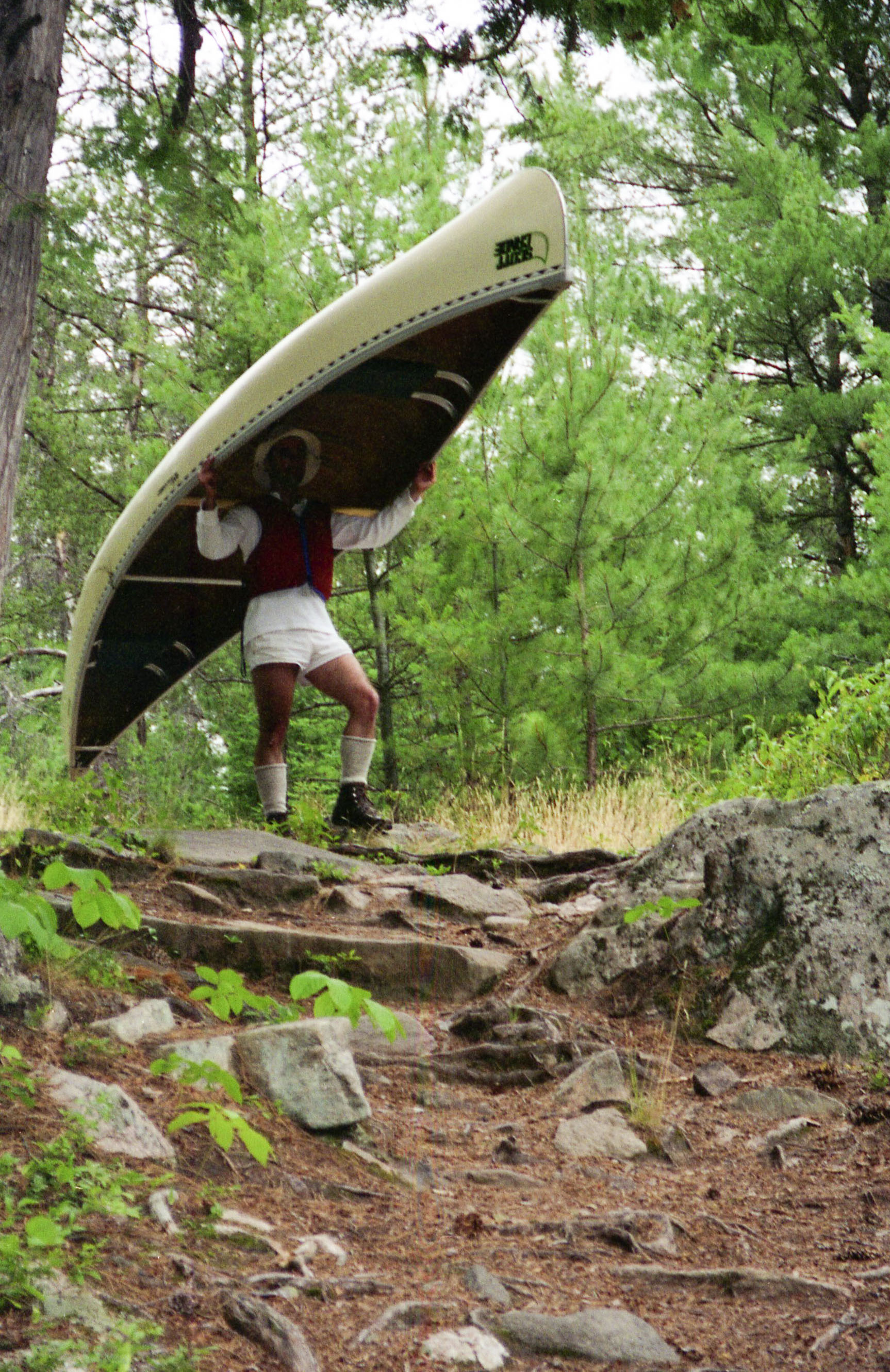
Portaging a tandem Prospector canoe in Algonquin Park

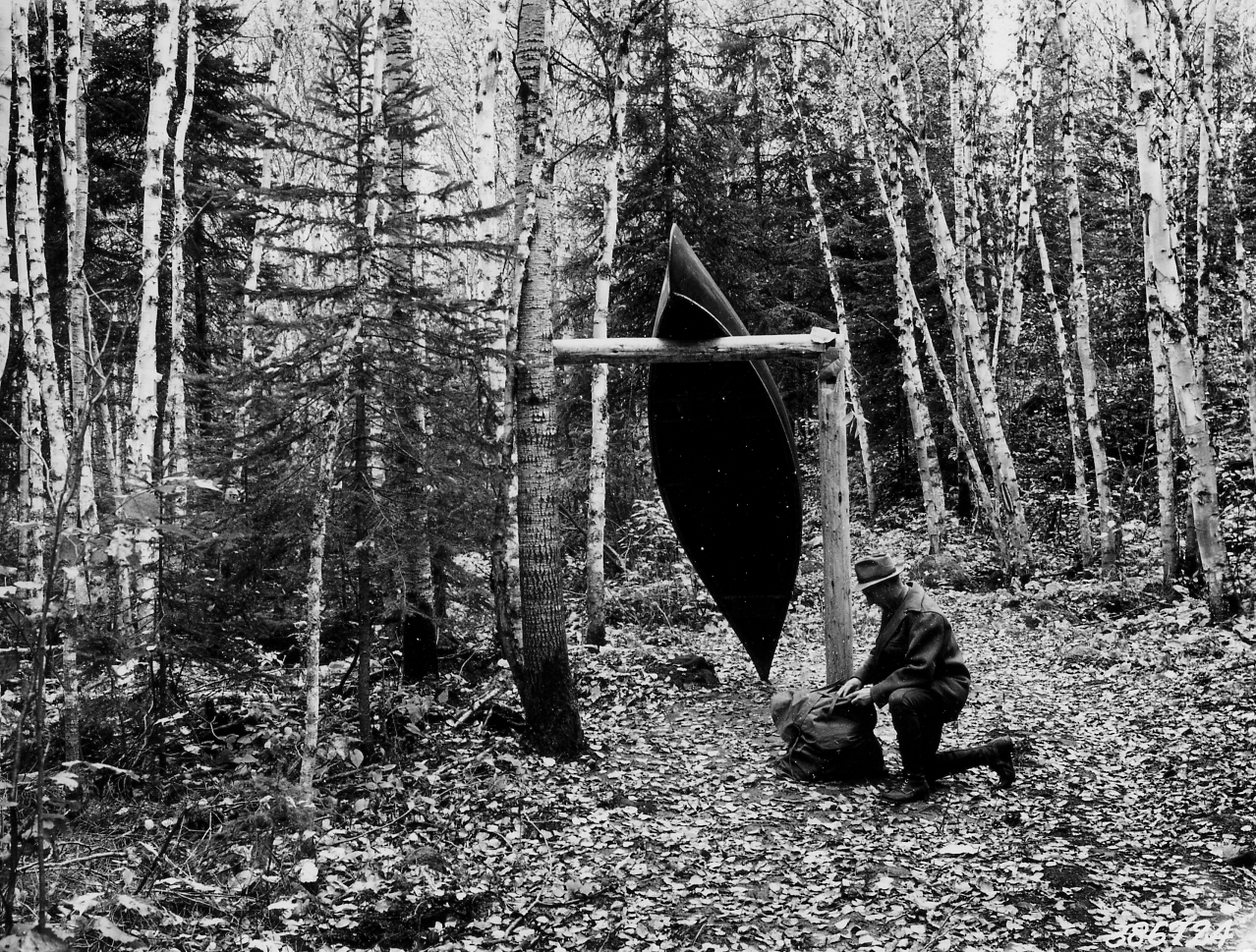
Canoe rest along a portage trail

Portage or portaging (CA: /pɔːrˈtɑːʒ/; US: /ˈpɔːrtɪdʒ/) is the practice of carrying water craft or cargo over land, either around an obstacle in a river, or between two bodies of water. A path where items are regularly carried between bodies of water is also called a portage. The term comes from French, where porter means "to carry", as in "portable".

Early French explorers in New France and French Louisiana encountered many rapids and cascades. The Native Americans carried their canoes over land to avoid river obstacles.

Over time, important portages were sometimes provided with canals with locks, and even portage railways. Primitive portaging generally involves carrying the vessel and its contents across the portage in multiple trips. Small canoes can be portaged by carrying them inverted over one's shoulders and the center strut may be designed in the style of a yoke to facilitate this. Historically, voyageurs often employed tump lines on their heads to carry loads on their backs.

Portages can be many kilometers in length, such as the 19-kilometre (12 mi) Methye Portage and the 14-kilometre (8 1/2 mi) Grand Portage (both in North America) often covering hilly or difficult terrain. Some portages involve very little elevation change, such as the very short Mavis Grind in Shetland, which crosses an isthmus.

== Technique ==
This section deals mostly with the portage of heavy freight canoes used by Canadian Voyageurs.

Portage trails usually began as animal tracks and were improved by tramping, blazing and cutting of trees, deadfall and brush. In a few places iron-plated wooden rails were laid to take a handcart. Some heavily used portages evolved into roads that allowed sledges, rollers or oxen to be used, as at Methye Portage. Sometimes railways (Champlain and St. Lawrence Railroad) or canals were built.

When going downstream and arriving at a rapids, an experienced voyageur called the guide would inspect the rapids and choose between the heavy work of a portage and the life-threatening risk of running the rapids. If it was decided to run the rapids, the boat was controlled by the avant standing in front with a long paddle and the gouvernail standing in the back with a 2.7-metre (9 ft) steering paddle. The avant had a better view and was in charge but the gouvernail had more control over the boat. The other canoemen provided power under the instructions of the avant.

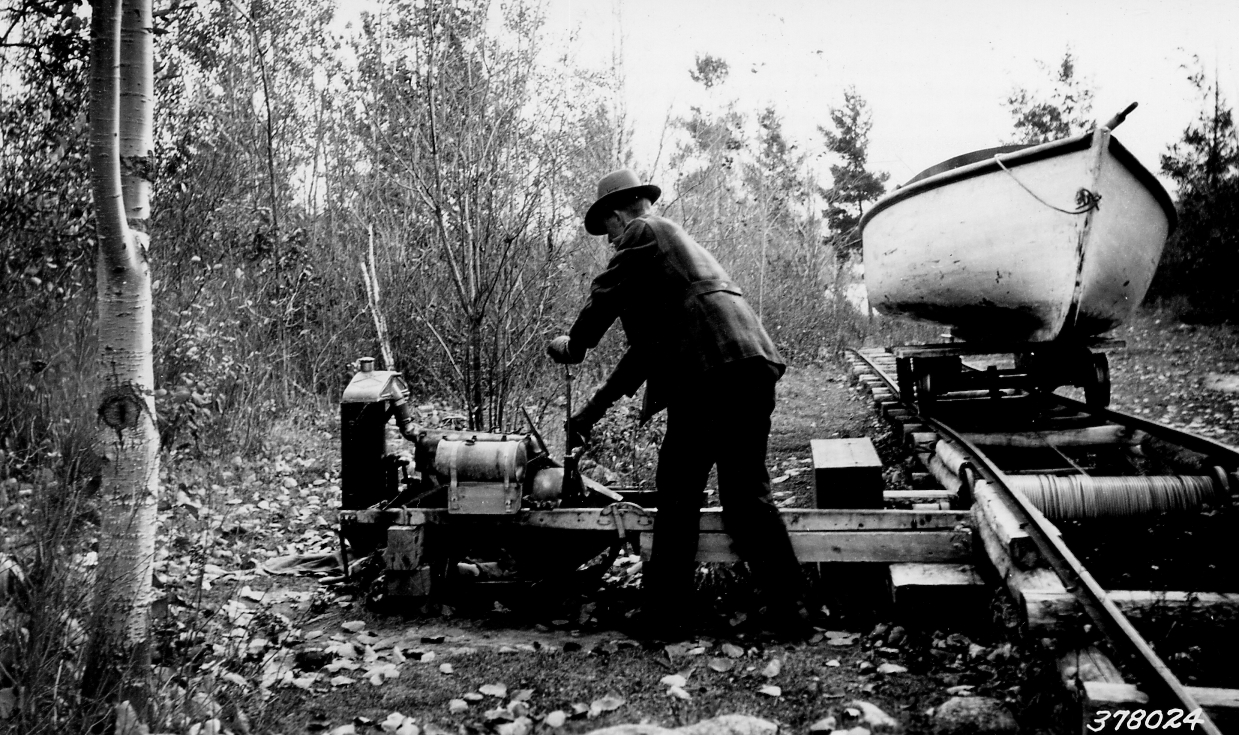
Small railway portage in the U.S.

Going upstream was more difficult, as there were many places where the current was too swift to paddle against. Where the river bottom was shallow and firm, voyageurs would stand in the canoe, put 3-metre (10 ft) poles in the water and push the boat upstream. If the shoreline was reasonably clear of obstruction, the canoe was 'tracked' or 'lined', that is, canoemen pulled the canoe on a rope while a man stayed on board to steer it away from the shore. (The most extreme case of tracking was in the Three Gorges in China where all boats had to be pulled upstream against the current of the Yangtze River.)

In other places, the 'demi-chargé' technique was used. Half the cargo was unloaded, the canoe forced upstream, unloaded and then returned downstream to pick up the remaining half of the cargo. When a boat had to fight against very strong currents, the entire cargo was unloaded ('décharge') and carried overland while the canoe was forced upstream.

Sometimes a full portage was necessary. The canoe was emptied, carried overland by two or four men, or dragged (the heavier York boats had to be dragged overland on rollers). The cargo was divided into standard 41-kilogram (90 lb) packs or pièces, with each man responsible for about six. One portage pack, or canoe pack, was carried on the back held up by a tumpline and another pack carried in front (strangulated hernia was a common cause of death for voyageurs). In long portages, to allow rests of a sort, voyageurs would drop their packs at poses set up about every 1 kilometre (1/2 mi) and go back for another load.

Portages varied in length and the time they required. For instance, the Methye Portage was 19 kilometres (12 mi) long. If a portage was about a half mile, a bit less than a kilometre, or about 160 rods (as they were measured) long, 15-20 minutes would be needed to walk it. With multiple trips, the time needed for a portage was estimated at one hour per half mile (160 rods) or more.

== History ==
=== Europe ===
==== Greco-Roman world ====
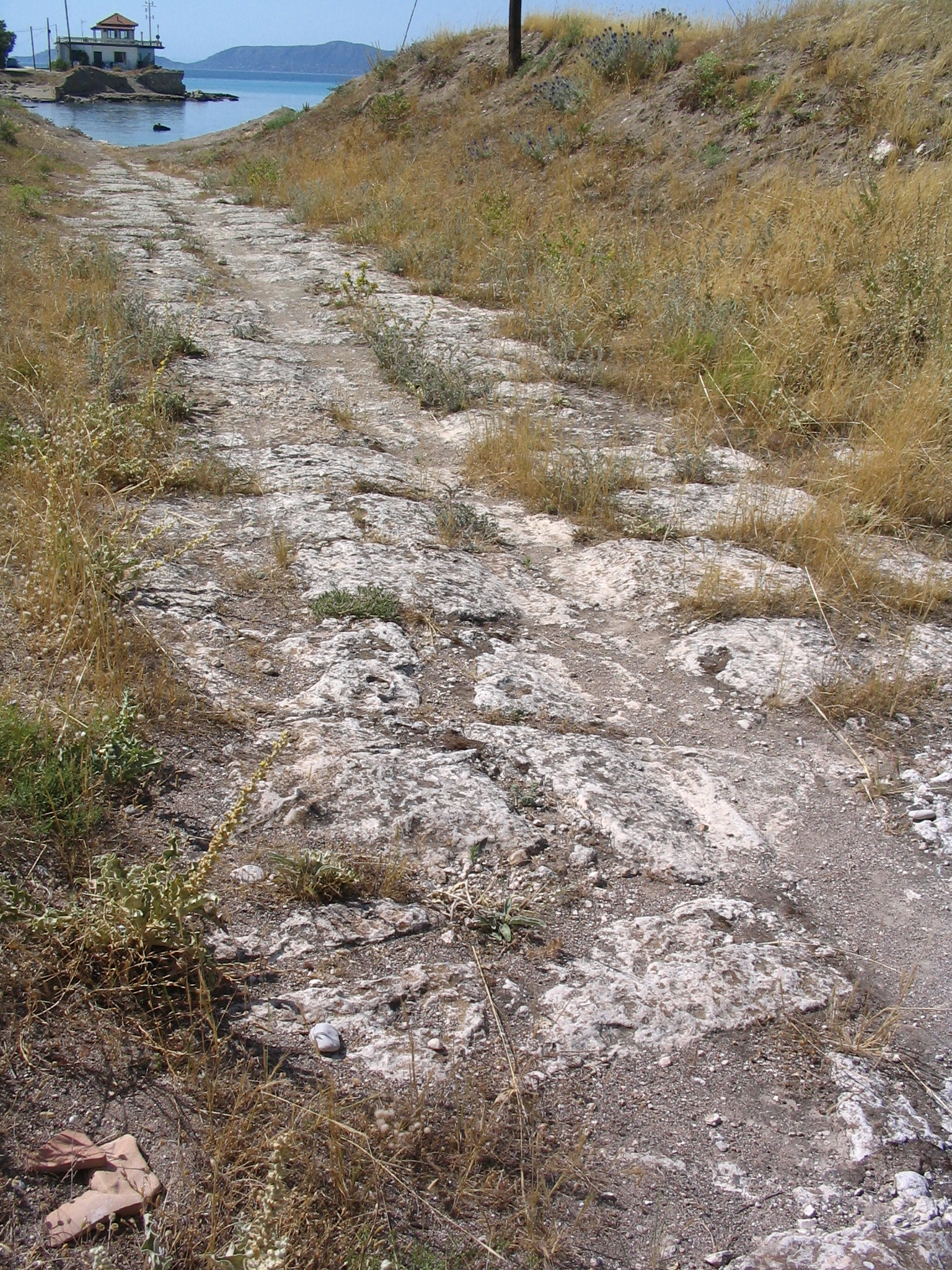
Paved section of the Diolkos

The Diolkos was a paved trackway in Ancient Greece which enabled boats to be moved overland across the Isthmus of Corinth between the Gulf of Corinth and the Saronic Gulf. The 6-to-8.5-kilometre-long (3 1/2–5 1/2 mi) roadway was a rudimentary form of railway, and operated from around 600 BC until the middle of the 1st century AD. The scale on which the Diolkos combined the two principles of the railway and the overland transport of ships was unique in antiquity.

There is scant literary evidence for two more ship trackways referred to as diolkoi in antiquity, both located in Roman Egypt: The physician Oribasius (c. 320–400 CE) records two passages from his first-century colleague Xenocrates, in which the latter casually refers to a diolkos close to the harbor of Alexandria, which may have been located at the southern tip of the island of Pharos. Another diolkos is mentioned by Ptolemy (90–168 CE) in his book on geography (IV, 5, 10) as connecting a false mouth of a partly silted up Nile branch with the Mediterranean Sea.

Writing in the first half of the eighth century, Cosmas of Jerusalem describes the portage of boats across the narrowest part of the Thracian Chersonese (Gallipoli Peninsula) between the Aegean Sea and the Sea of Marmara. The peninsula there is six miles wide. Cosmas describes the dragging of small boats as common in his day for local trade between Thrace and Gothograecia. The motivation for this practice was to avoid the long detour around the peninsula and through the Dardanelles, but also to avoid the customs house at Abydos. It would have been too costly to regularly move large ships across the peninsula, but Cosmas says that Constantine IV did it, presumably during the blockade of Constantinople (670/1–676/7) when the Sea of Marmara and the Dardanelles were controlled by the Umayyads. Constantine is said to have "driven" the ships rather than dragged them, probably indicating the use of wheels. Archaeological evidence for a portage across the Thracian Chersonese is lacking, but it is possible that traces of it have been confused with traces of the Long Wall, which was restored by Justinian I in the 6th century. The region also saw extensive damage during the Gallipoli Campaign of 1915.

==== Pre-Viking and Viking era northern Germany ====
The Skagerrak always has been treacherous for shipping and early navigators tried to avoid it. There are various river systems in (modern) northern Germany and southern Denmark where the watershed is narrow and low, such as between the Treene (discharging into the North Sea) and the Schlei (discharging into the Baltic) that would have allowed portage. There is no certain physical or written evidence, except that it is known that goods were transported along these routes between different merchant settlements.

==== Venetian Republic ====
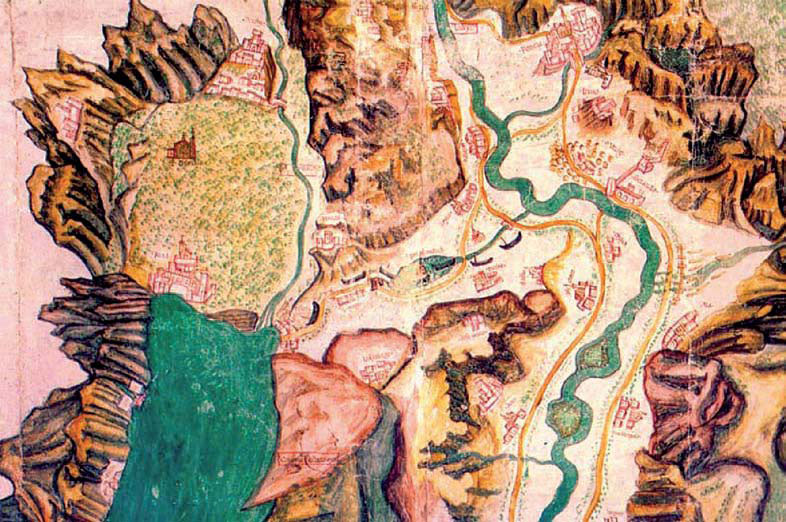
A map of the trip of the Venetian warships.

The land link between Adige River and Garda Lake in Northern Italy, hardly used by the smallest watercraft, was at least once used by the Venetian Republic for the transport of a military fleet in 1439. The land link is now somewhat harder because of the disappearance of Loppio Lake.

==== Russia ====
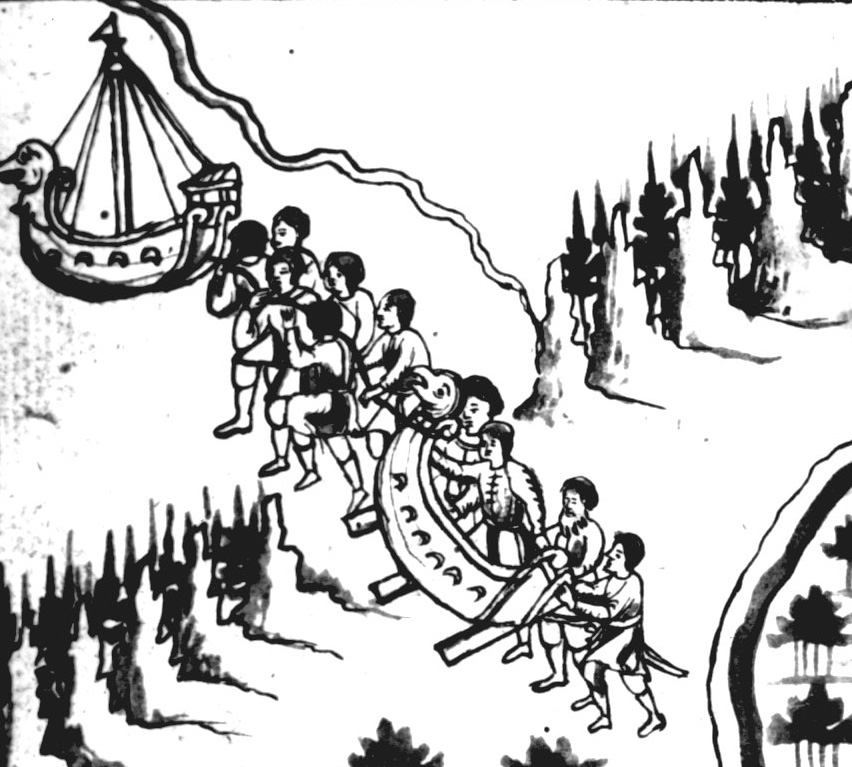
Yermak Timofeyevich and his band of adventurers crossing the Ural Mountains over the Tagil portage, entering Asia from Europe

In the 8th, 9th and 10th centuries, Viking merchant-adventurers exploited a network of waterways in Eastern Europe, with portages connecting the four most important rivers of the region: Volga, Western Dvina, Dnieper, and Don. The portages of what is now Russia were vital for the Varangian commerce with the Orient and Byzantium.

At the most important portages (such as Gnezdovo) there were trade outposts inhabited by a mixture of Norse merchants and native population. The Khazars built the fortress of Sarkel to guard a key portage between the Volga and the Don. After Varangian and Khazar power in Eastern Europe waned, Slavic merchants continued to use the portages along the Volga trade route and the Dnieper trade route.

The names of the towns Volokolamsk and Vyshny Volochek may be translated as "the portage on the Lama River" and "the little upper portage", respectively (from Russian волок volok, meaning "portage", derived from the verb волочить voločitʹ "to drag").

In the 16th century, the Russians used river portages to get to Siberia (see Cherdyn Road).

==== Scotland and Ireland ====
Tarbert is a common place name in Scotland and Ireland indicating the site of a portage.

=== Africa ===
Portages played an important role in the economy of some African societies. For instance, Bamako was chosen as the capital of Mali because it is located on the Niger River near the rapids that divide the Upper and Middle Niger Valleys.

=== North America ===
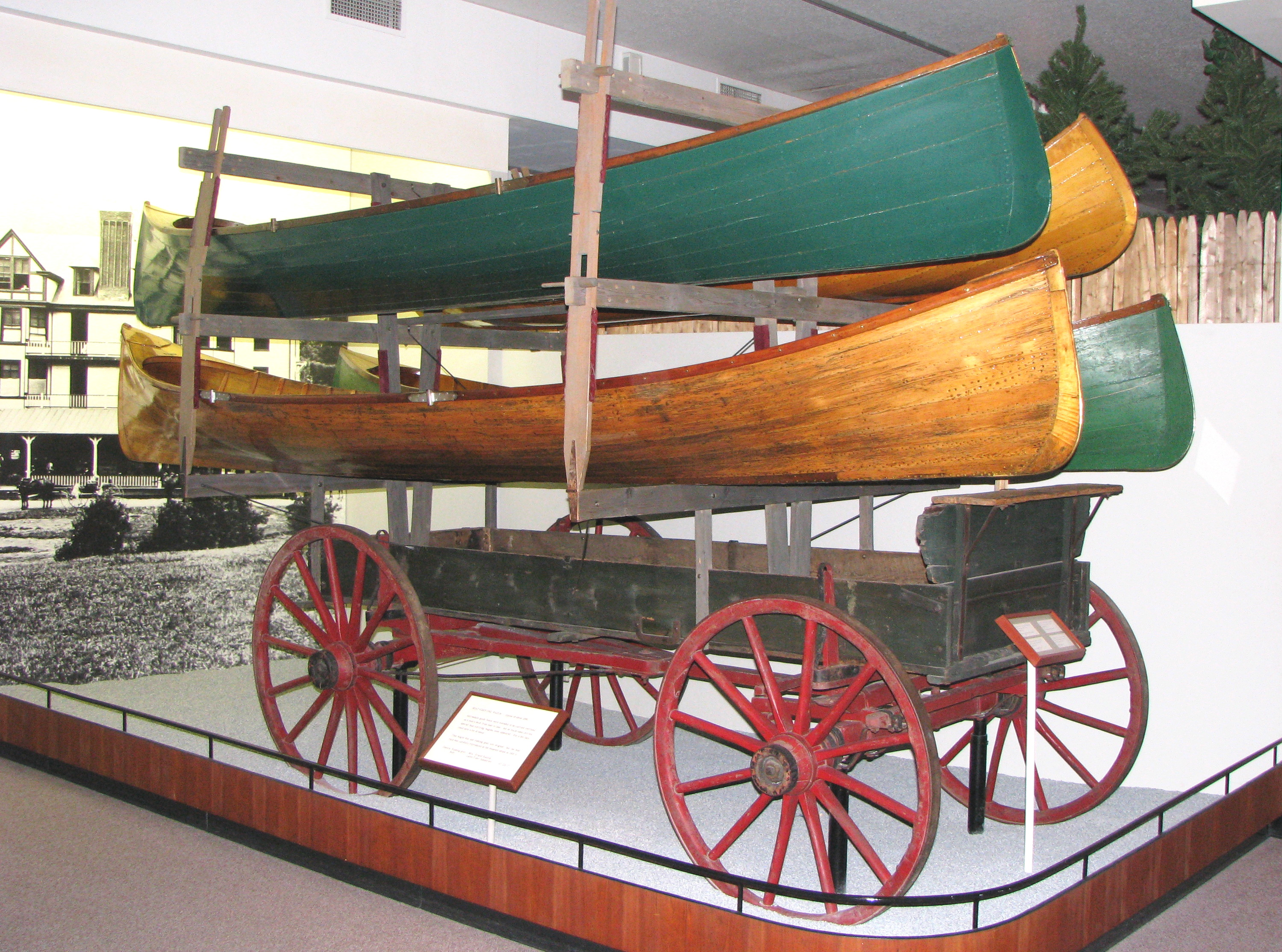
In the Adirondacks at portages that were heavily used, horse-drawn wagons like this one were furnished with racks for carrying several boats at once, for a fee. This example is typical of those used in the 1890s. (Adirondack Museum).

Places where portaging occurred often became temporary and then permanent settlements. The importance of free passage through portages found them included in laws and treaties. One historically important fur trade portage is now Grand Portage National Monument. Recreational canoeing routes often include portages between lakes, for example, the Seven Carries route in Adirondack Park. (In the Adirondacks, a portage is traditionally called a "carry".)

Numerous portages were upgraded to carriageways and railways due to their economic importance. The Niagara Portage had a gravity railway in the 1760s. The passage between the Chicago and Des Plaines Rivers was through a short swamp portage which seasonally flooded and it is thought that a channel gradually developed unintentionally from the dragging of the boat bottoms. The 1835 Champlain and St. Lawrence Railroad connected the cities of New York and Montreal without needing to go through the Atlantic.

Many settlements in North America were named for being on a portage.

=== Oceania ===
==== New Zealand ====
Portages existed in a number of locations where an isthmus existed that the local Māori could drag or carry their waka across from the Tasman Sea to the Pacific Ocean or vice versa. The most famous ones are located in Auckland, where there remain three roads named 'Portage Road's in separate parts of the city. Portage Road in the Auckland suburb of Otahuhu has historical plaques at both the north and south ends proclaiming it to be 'at half a mile in length, surely the shortest road between two seas'.

The small Marlborough Sounds settlement of Portage lies on the Kenepuru Sound which links Queen Charlotte Sound at Torea Bay. This portage was created by mid-19th century settler Robert Blaymires.

== See also ==
- Porter (carrier)
