= Fayal Township, St. Louis County, Minnesota =

Township in Saint Louis County, Minnesota, United States

Fayal Township, Minnesota
- Township
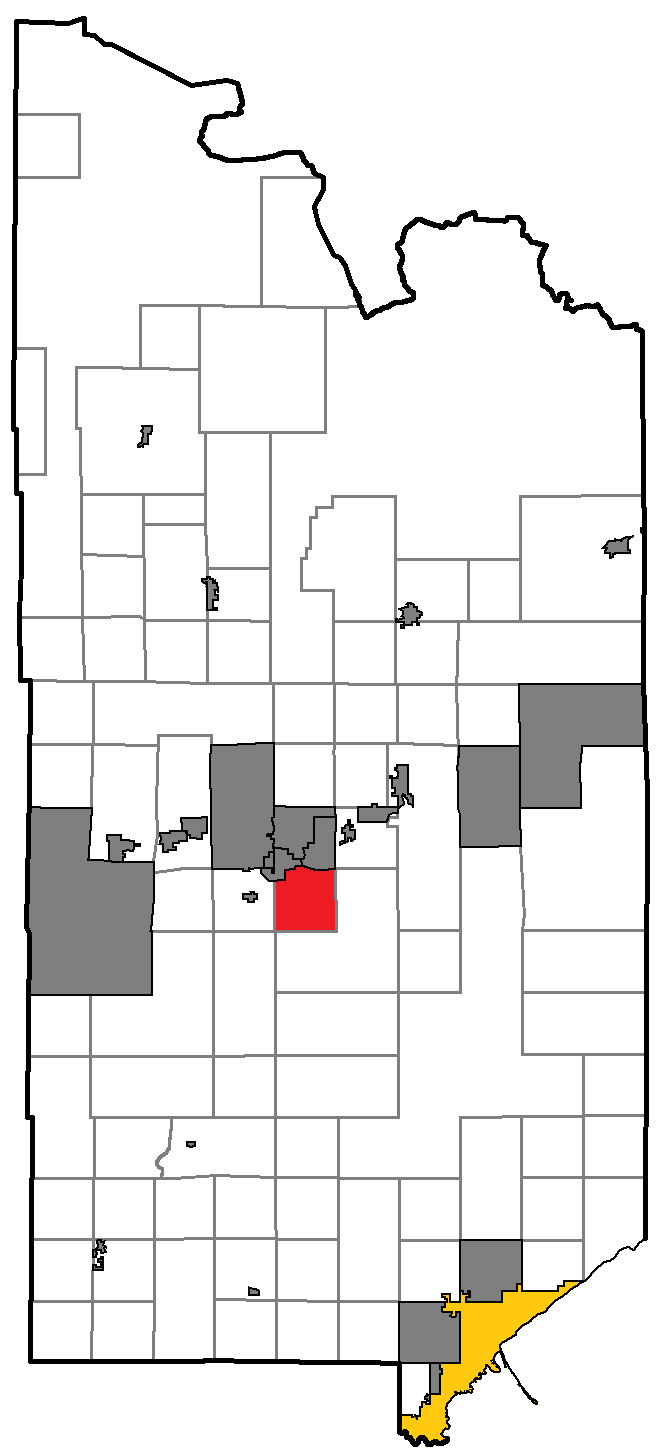
- Location of Fayal Township within St. Louis County, Minnesota
- Coordinates: 47°25′16″N 92°30′42″W
- Country: United States
- State: Minnesota
- County: Saint Louis

Area
  - Total: 34.4 sq mi (89.2 km^{2})
  - Land: 31.4 sq mi (81.4 km^{2})
  - Water: 3.0 sq mi (7.8 km^{2})
- Elevation: 1,368 ft (417 m)

Population (2020)
  - Total: 1,809
  - Density: 57.6/sq mi (22.2/km^{2})
- Time zone: UTC-6 (Central (CST))
  - Summer (DST): UTC-5 (CDT)
- FIPS code: 27-20762
- GNIS feature ID: 0664152
- Website: www.fayaltwp.org

Fayal Township is an urban township in Saint Louis County, Minnesota, United States. The population was 1,809 at the 2020 census.

U.S. Highway 53 and State Highway 37 (MN 37) are two of the main routes in the township. Other routes include Bodas Road.

== Etymology ==
The township was named after Fayal Island in the Atlantic Ocean.

== Geography ==
According to the United States Census Bureau, the township has an area of 34.5 square miles (89 km^{2}); 31.4 square miles (81 km^{2}) is land and 3.0 square miles (7.8 km^{2}), or 8.77%, is water.

Eveleth–Virginia Municipal Airport is within Fayal Township.

The Saint Louis River flows through the township's southeast corner.

=== Adjacent townships, cities, and communities ===
The following are adjacent to Fayal Township:

- The city of Eveleth (north)
- The city of Gilbert (north)
- Clinton Township (west)
- Iron Junction (west)
- The unincorporated community of Forbes (west-southwest)
- McDavitt Township (southwest)
- Heikkala Lake Unorganized Territory (south)
- The unincorporated community of Central Lakes (south)
- Mud Hen Lake Unorganized Territory (southeast)
- The unincorporated community of Makinen (southeast)
- Tikander Lake Unorganized Territory (east)
- The unincorporated community of Palo (east)
- Biwabik Township (northeast)

== Demographics ==
At the 2000 census there were 1,906 people in 769 households, including 586 families, in the township. The population density was 60.7 inhabitants per square mile (23.4/km^{2}). There were 948 housing units at an average density of 30.2 per square mile (11.7/km^{2}). The racial makeup of the township was 97.74% White, 0.05% African American, 0.42% Native American, 0.52% Asian, 0.10% Pacific Islander, 0.21% from other races, and 0.94% from two or more races. Hispanic or Latino of any race were 0.42%.

Of the 769 households, 30.3% had children under the age of 18 living with them, 69.4% were married couples living together, 3.9% had a female householder with no husband present, and 23.7% were non-families. 20.2% of households were one person and 9.6% were one person aged 65 or older. The average household size was 2.47 and the average family size was 2.86.

The age distribution was 23.2% under the age of 18, 4.6% from 18 to 24, 22.8% from 25 to 44, 32.9% from 45 to 64, and 16.5% 65 or older. The median age was 45. For every 100 females, there were 104.7 males. For every 100 females age 18 and over, there were 100.5 males.

The median household income was $50,665 and the median family income was $56,985. Males had a median income of $43,611 versus $28,295 for females. The per capita income for the township was $22,938. About 0.7% of families and 2.3% of the population were below the poverty line, including 0.6% of those under age 18 and 9.7% of those age 65 or over.
