= Peary, Minnesota =

Peary
- Unincorporated community
- Location within Minnesota Location within the United States
- Coordinates: 47°22′19″N 92°33′23″W
- Country: United States
- State: Minnesota
- County: Saint Louis
- Elevation: 1,325 ft (404 m)

Population
  - Total: 20
- Time zone: UTC-6 (Central (CST))
  - Summer (DST): UTC-5 (CDT)
- ZIP code: 55738
- Area code: 218
- GNIS feature ID: 662151

Peary is an unincorporated community in Saint Louis County, Minnesota, United States.

== Geography ==
The community is located south of the city of Eveleth at the intersection of Saint Louis County Highway 16 (CR 16) and Peary Road. Peary is located on the survey point boundary line for Clinton Township, Fayal Township, and McDavitt Township.

State Highway 37 (MN 37) and U.S. Highway 53 are both nearby. The community of Forbes and the Saint Louis River are in the vicinity.

== History ==
The community was named for Robert Peary (1856–1920), an American explorer.
