= Clinton Township, St. Louis County, Minnesota =

Clinton Township, Minnesota
- Township
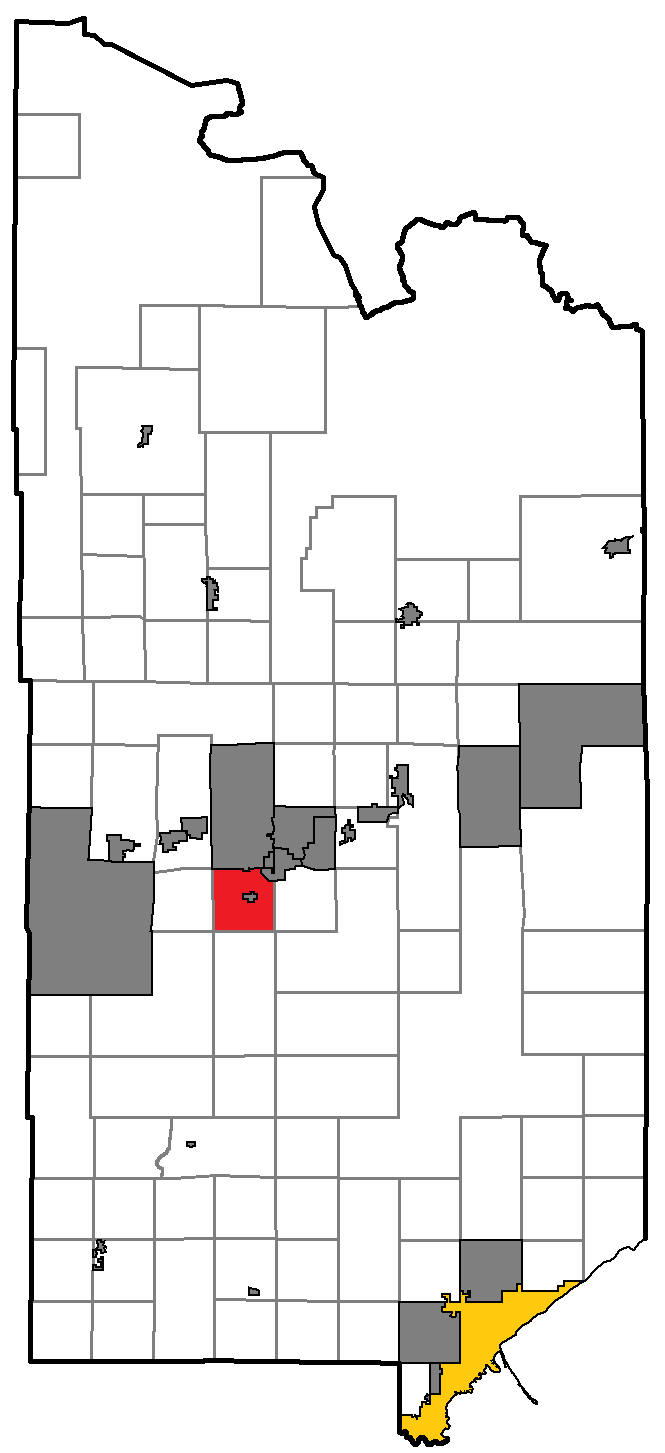
- Location of Clinton Township within St. Louis County
- Coordinates: 47°24′21″N 92°36′54″W
- Country: United States
- State: Minnesota
- County: Saint Louis

Area
  - Total: 33.9 sq mi (87.7 km^{2})
  - Land: 33.2 sq mi (86.0 km^{2})
  - Water: 0.66 sq mi (1.7 km^{2})
- Elevation: 1,375 ft (419 m)

Population (2020)
  - Total: 977
  - Density: 29.4/sq mi (11.4/km^{2})
- Time zone: UTC-6 (Central (CST))
  - Summer (DST): UTC-5 (CDT)
- Area code: 218
- FIPS code: 27-12016
- GNIS feature ID: 0663827
- Website: https://clintontownshipmn.org/

Clinton Township is a township in Saint Louis County, Minnesota, United States. Clinton Township was named for Clinton Markell, a prominent settler. The population was 977 at the 2020 census.

State Highway 37 (MN 37) and Saint Louis County Highway 7 are two of the main routes in the township. Other routes include Iron Junction Road.

The city of Iron Junction is located within Clinton Township geographically but is a separate entity.

The unincorporated communities of Keenan, Ramshaw, and Wolf are located within the township.

The unincorporated community of Forbes also extends into the southern portion of Clinton Township.

The unincorporated community of Peary is located at the southeast corner of the township.

== Geography ==
According to the United States Census Bureau, the township has a total area of 33.9 square miles (88 km^{2}); 33.2 square miles (86 km^{2}) is land and 0.6 square miles (1.6 km^{2}), or 1.92%, is water.

The East Two River and Elbow Creek both flow through Clinton Township.

Long Lake Creek flows through the southeast corner of the township.

=== Adjacent townships, cities, and communities ===
The following are adjacent to Clinton Township :

- Fayal Township (east)
- The city of Eveleth (northeast)
- The city of Leonidas (northeast)
- The city of Mountain Iron (north)
- Great Scott Township (northwest)
- Cherry Township (west)
- Lavell Township (southwest)
- McDavitt Township (south)
- The unincorporated community of Zim (south)
- The unincorporated community of Central Lakes (southeast)

=== Unincorporated communities ===
- Keenan
- Ramshaw
- Wolf
- Forbes
- Peary

== Demographics ==
As of the census of 2000, there were 1,036 people, 405 households, and 302 families residing in the township. The population density was 31.2 inhabitants per square mile (12.0/km^{2}). There were 421 housing units at an average density of 12.7 per square mile (4.9/km^{2}). The racial makeup of the township was 96.81% White, 0.29% Black or African American, 1.06% Native American, 0.29% Asian, 0.19% from other races, and 1.35% from two or more races. Hispanic or Latino of any race were 1.16% of the population.

There were 405 households, out of which 31.4% had children under the age of 18 living with them, 62.2% were married couples living together, 5.9% had a female householder with no husband present, and 25.4% were non-families. 21.0% of all households were made up of individuals, and 5.7% had someone living alone who was 65 years of age or older. The average household size was 2.56 and the average family size was 2.93.

In the township the population was spread out, with 25.5% under the age of 18, 8.0% from 18 to 24, 26.9% from 25 to 44, 29.1% from 45 to 64, and 10.5% who were 65 years of age or older. The median age was 39 years. For every 100 females, there were 115.8 males. For every 100 females age 18 and over, there were 113.3 males.

The median income for a household in the township was $44,773, and the median income for a family was $45,556. Males had a median income of $41,417 versus $23,068 for females. The per capita income for the township was $18,359. About 3.5% of families and 6.4% of the population were below the poverty line, including 8.3% of those under age 18 and 7.4% of those age 65 or over.
