= Cherry, Minnesota =

Cherry
- Unincorporated community
- Location within Minnesota Location within the United States
- Coordinates: 47°24′03″N 92°42′26″W
- Country: United States
- State: Minnesota
- County: Saint Louis
- Township: Cherry Township
- Elevation: 1,352 ft (412 m)

Population
  - Total: 70
- Time zone: UTC-6 (Central (CST))
  - Summer (DST): UTC-5 (CDT)
- ZIP code: 55751
- Area code: 218
- GNIS feature ID: 660988

Cherry is an unincorporated community in Cherry Township, Saint Louis County, Minnesota, United States.

The community is located 10 miles (16 km) east of the city of Hibbing at the junction of State Highway 37 (MN 37) and Saint Louis County Road 25 (CR 25). Cherry is located 12 miles (19 km) west-southwest of the city of Eveleth.

The West Two River flows through the community. Iron Junction and Forbes are nearby.

The unincorporated community of Cherry is located within Cherry Township (population 860).
