= Ellsburg Township, St. Louis County, Minnesota =

Ellsburg Township, Minnesota
- Township
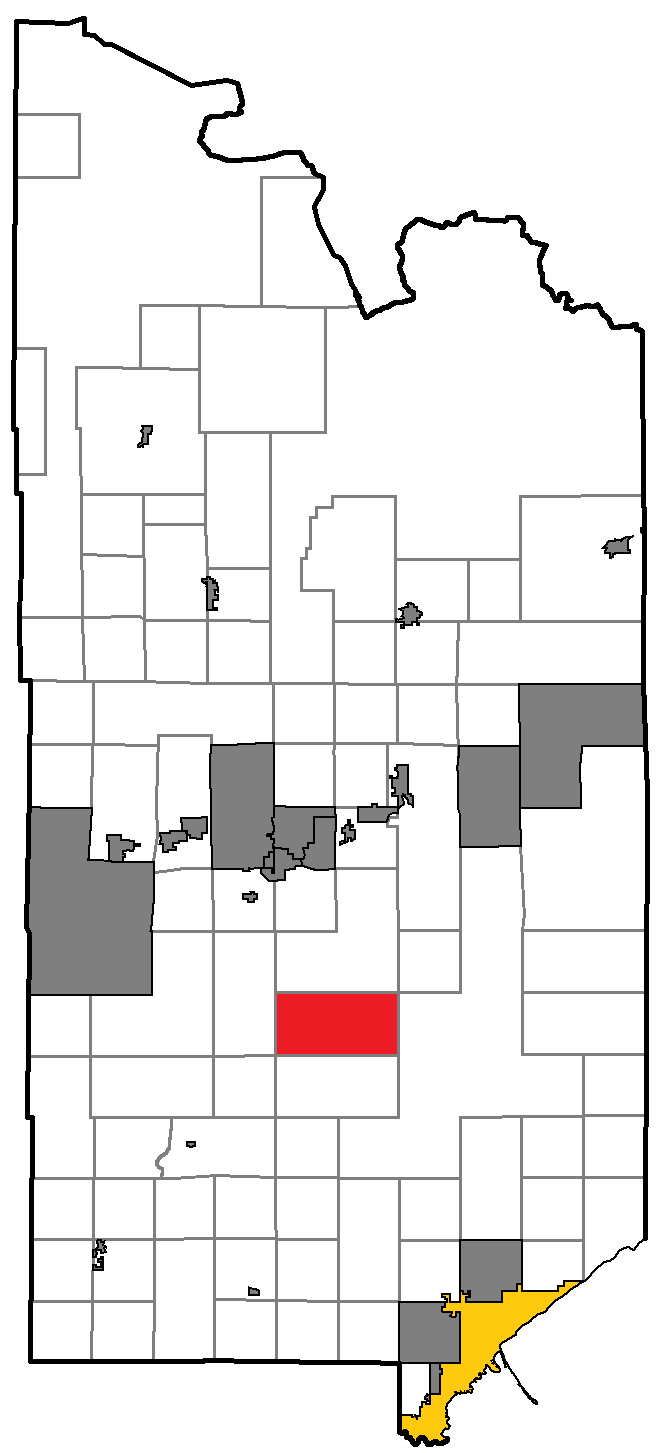
- Location of Ellsburg Township within St. Louis County, Minnesota
- Coordinates: 47°14′11″N 92°24′37″W
- Country: United States
- State: Minnesota
- County: Saint Louis

Area
  - Total: 72.0 sq mi (186.5 km^{2})
  - Land: 69.6 sq mi (180.2 km^{2})
  - Water: 2.4 sq mi (6.3 km^{2})
- Elevation: 1,342 ft (409 m)

Population (2020)
  - Total: 188
  - Density: 2.70/sq mi (1.04/km^{2})
- Time zone: UTC-6 (Central (CST))
  - Summer (DST): UTC-5 (CDT)
- ZIP codes: 55766
- Area code: 218
- FIPS code: 27-18800
- GNIS feature ID: 0664076
- Website: https://ellsburgtownshipmn.gov/

Ellsburg Township is a township in Saint Louis County, Minnesota, United States. The population was 188 at the 2020 census.

U.S. Highway 53 serves as a main route in the township.

The unincorporated community of Melrude is located within Ellsburg Township.

The town was named for a place in Sweden.

== Geography ==
According to the United States Census Bureau, the township has a total area of 72.0 square miles (186 km^{2}); 69.6 square miles (180 km^{2}) is land and 2.4 square miles (6.2 km^{2}), or 3.39%, is water.

The Paleface River and Bobcat Creek both flow through the township.

=== Adjacent townships and communities ===
The following are adjacent to Ellsburg Township :

- Cotton Township (south)
- McDavitt Township (west)
- Kelsey Township (southwest)
- Colvin Township (northeast)
- Mud Hen Lake Unorganized Territory (north)
- The unincorporated community of Makinen (north)
- Heikkala Lake Unorganized Territory (north)
- The unincorporated community of Central Lakes (north)
- Linwood Lake Unorganized Territory (east)
- Whiteface Reservoir Unorganized Territory (southeast)

The eastern portion of Ellsburg Township is located within the Cloquet Valley State Forest in Saint Louis County.

=== Unincorporated communities ===
- Melrude

== Demographics ==
At the 2000 census there were 174 people, 77 households, and 51 families living in the township. The population density was 2.5 people per square mile (1.0/km^{2}). There were 318 housing units at an average density of 4.6/sq mi (1.8/km^{2}). The racial makeup of the township was 98.85% White, 0.57% African American and 0.57% Native American. Of the 77 households 19.5% had children under the age of 18 living with them, 58.4% were married couples living together, 9.1% had a female householder with no husband present, and 32.5% were non-families. 27.3% of households were one person and 10.4% were one person aged 65 or older. The average household size was 2.26 and the average family size was 2.77.

The age distribution was 18.4% under the age of 18, 5.7% from 18 to 24, 25.9% from 25 to 44, 31.0% from 45 to 64, and 19.0% 65 or older. The median age was 45 years. For every 100 females, there were 112.2 males. For every 100 females age 18 and over, there were 118.5 males.

The median household income was $39,250 and the median family income was $42,500. Males had a median income of $41,875 versus $26,875 for females. The per capita income for the township was $15,582. About 23.1% of families and 21.4% of the population were below the poverty line, including 41.0% of those under the age of eighteen and none of those sixty five or over.
