= Keenan, Minnesota =

Keenan
- Unincorporated community
- Location within Minnesota Location within the United States
- Coordinates: 47°23′00″N 92°36′16″W
- Country: United States
- State: Minnesota
- County: Saint Louis
- Township: Clinton Township
- Elevation: 1,355 ft (413 m)

Population
  - Total: 20
- Time zone: UTC-6 (Central (CST))
  - Summer (DST): UTC-5 (CDT)
- ZIP code: 55738 or 55751
- Area code: 218
- GNIS feature ID: 661622

Keenan is an unincorporated community in Clinton Township, Saint Louis County, Minnesota, United States.

== Geography ==
The community is located 9 miles southwest of the city of Eveleth, near the intersection of Saint Louis County Highway 7 and County Road 310 (Keenan Road).

Elbow Creek flows through the community. Iron Junction and the community of Forbes are both nearby.

== History ==
The community bears the name of C. J. Keenan, a railroad agent.
