= Minnesota State Highway 135 =

State highway in Minnesota, United States

Trunk Highway 135
- MN 135 highlighted in red

Route information
- Maintained by MnDOT
- Length: 36.160 mi (58.194 km)
- Existed: November 2, 1920–present

Major junctions
- South end: US 53 at Virginia
- MN 37 at Gilbert; CR 20 at McKinley; CR 4 at Biwabik; CR 100 at Aurora; CR 21 at Embarrass Twp.
- North end: MN 1 / MN 169 at Tower

Location
- Country: United States
- State: Minnesota
- Counties: St. Louis

Highway system
- Minnesota Trunk Highway System; Interstate; US; State; Legislative; Scenic
← MN 127	→ MN 139

Minnesota State Highway 135 (MN 135) is a 36.160-mile-long (58.194 km) highway in northeast Minnesota, which runs from its interchange with U.S. Highway 53 in the city of Virginia and continues northeast to its northern terminus at its intersection with State Highway 1 in Tower.

The route is also known as the historic Vermilion Trail from Biwabik to Tower. Highway 135 is also known as "Main Street" within the city of Biwabik. Highway 135 was originally designated 35 until it was re-numbered to avoid confusion with Interstate Highway 35.

Between Virginia and Gilbert, the highway twice crosses the Laurentian Divide.

== Route description ==
Highway 135 serves as an east–west and north–south route between the cities of Virginia, Gilbert, Biwabik, Aurora, and Tower in northeast Minnesota.

The route changes direction to north–south as it approaches Aurora and continues as north–south to its northern terminus in Tower.

The highway is officially marked as a north–south route by its highway shields from beginning to end.

The route is legally defined as Constitutional Route 35 in the Minnesota Statutes.

== History ==
The highway was authorized as State Highway 35 on November 2, 1920. Originally, it began at Highway 18 on the northwestern shore of Mille Lacs Lake near Nichols. It ran north to Grand Rapids and turned east-northeast through the Iron Range to Ely. By 1923, the only paved portion was from Grand Rapids to Chisholm, and the highway was still unimproved for several miles north of Hill City. This segment was graveled that year, and the portion from Chisholm to Aurora was paved as well. The highway was paved from Tower to Ely in the late 1920s.

When U.S. Route 169 was marked within Minnesota in 1930, it was routed along Highway 35 from its southern terminus to its junction with State Highway 11 near Virginia. It was paved from Aitkin to its first crossing with the Mississippi River and bituminous surfaced along the remaining portion of the roadway from Garrison to Grand Rapids in 1931, and rerouted south of its former alignment between Keewatin and Hibbing in 1932.

Highway 35 was truncated to its current extent in 1934, replaced by U.S. 169 west and south of Virginia and by the newly-marked State Highway 1 east of Tower.

The highway was realigned near Embarrass in the 1950s. In 1951, the segment south of present-day County Road 21 was realigned west of its original alignment, shortening the road by nearly two miles; this section was paved in 1952. Also that year, the portion north of County 21 was realigned, shortening the roadway by one mile. This segment was paved in 1954, making the route paved in its entirety.

The highway was re-numbered as 135 in 1958 to avoid duplication with Interstate Highway 35 that was being built in Minnesota during that time.

In 1964, the highway underwent a significant realignment; instead of entering downtown Aurora, it was rerouted to turn northward at the city limit and travel several miles before making a sharp curve eastward to rejoin its existing route. This change lengthened the highway by nearly 2 1/2 miles. Billed as a scenic route, it opened to traffic that autumn.

Also that year, the highway was extended through the city of Virginia as a business route to U.S. 53 after construction of the U.S. 53 bypass around the city. This business route had followed both 2nd Avenue and 9th Street North in Virginia until it was removed in 1996.

The highway was rerouted between Gilbert and Biwabik in 1972. Where the original route had turned northeastward at its junction with Highway 37, it now traveled southeast and crossed to the south side of the Duluth, Missabe and Iron Range Railway for several miles before turning to the north, crossing the railway again, and rejoining its original alignment in Biwabik. The Minncor mine now exists in place of parts of the original routing.

The northern terminus of the highway was rerouted in 2010 and shifted 0.08 miles westward, following Pine Street to its junction with Highway 1 instead of crossing the East Two River on Enterprise Drive. A new roadway was later constructed even further west, bypassing Tower city streets altogether.

== Major intersections ==
The entire route is in St. Louis County.

Location	mi	km	Destinations	Notes
Virginia	3.546– 3.794	5.707– 6.106	US 53 – Duluth, Virginia	Interchange
Gilbert	6.040	9.720	CR 105 (Indiana Avenue)	
Gilbert	6.641	10.688	MN 37 west (Nokomis Street) / FFH 11 (Superior National Forest Scenic Byway) – Eveleth	West end of Forest Highway 11 overlap
Biwabik Township	9.546	15.363	CR 20	
Biwabik	14.443	23.244	CR 4 (Vermilion Trail)	
Biwabik	15.303	24.628	CR 138	
Aurora	17.904	28.814	CR 100 east / FFH 11 (Superior National Forest Scenic Byway) / CR 110 south	East end of Forest Highway 11 overlap
Embarrass Township	28.578	45.992	CR 21	
Kugler Township	34.371	55.315	CR 26	
Tower	39.475	63.529	MN 1 / MN 169 – Ely, Cook	
1.000 mi = 1.609 km; 1.000 km = 0.621 mi: Concurrency terminus
