= Fermoy (disambiguation) =

Fermoy is a town in County Cork, Ireland. Fermoy may also refer to:

Places

- Fermoy (barony), County Cork; near the Irish town
- Fermoy, Minnesota, United States
- Fermoy, Ontario, Canada

Other

- Baron Fermoy, title in the Peerage of Ireland created in 1856 for Edmond Roche
- Fermoy GAA, club based in the Irish town
- HMS Fermoy (J40), a Hunt-class minesweeper of the Royal Navy that served during both World War I and World War II
