= Spina, Minnesota =

Ghost town in Minnesota, United States

Spina
- Ghost town
- Location within Minnesota
- Coordinates: 47°31′37″N 92°44′27″W
- Country: United States
- State: Minnesota
- County: Saint Louis
- Time zone: UTC-6 (Central (CST))
  - Summer (DST): UTC-5 (CDT)
- Area code: 218
- GNIS feature ID: 664335

Spina is an abandoned townsite in Great Scott Township, Saint Louis County, Minnesota, United States.

== History ==
The village of Spina was established after W.J. Power gained control of the Kinney Mine in 1909. It was served by a station of the Great Northern Railway.
