= Wolf, Minnesota =

Wolf
- Unincorporated community
- Location within Minnesota Location within the United States
- Coordinates: 47°27′02″N 92°36′32″W
- Country: United States
- State: Minnesota
- County: Saint Louis
- Township: Clinton Township
- Elevation: 1,407 ft (429 m)

Population
  - Total: 20
- Time zone: UTC-6 (Central (CST))
  - Summer (DST): UTC-5 (CDT)
- ZIP code: 55751
- Area code: 218
- GNIS feature ID: 662817

Wolf is an unincorporated community in Clinton Township, Saint Louis County, Minnesota, United States.

The community is located immediately south of the city of Mountain Iron, near the intersection of Saint Louis County Road 101 (Kane Road) and County Road 955 (Wolf Road). Iron Junction is nearby.
