= Great Scott Township, St. Louis County, Minnesota =

Great Scott Township, Minnesota
- Township
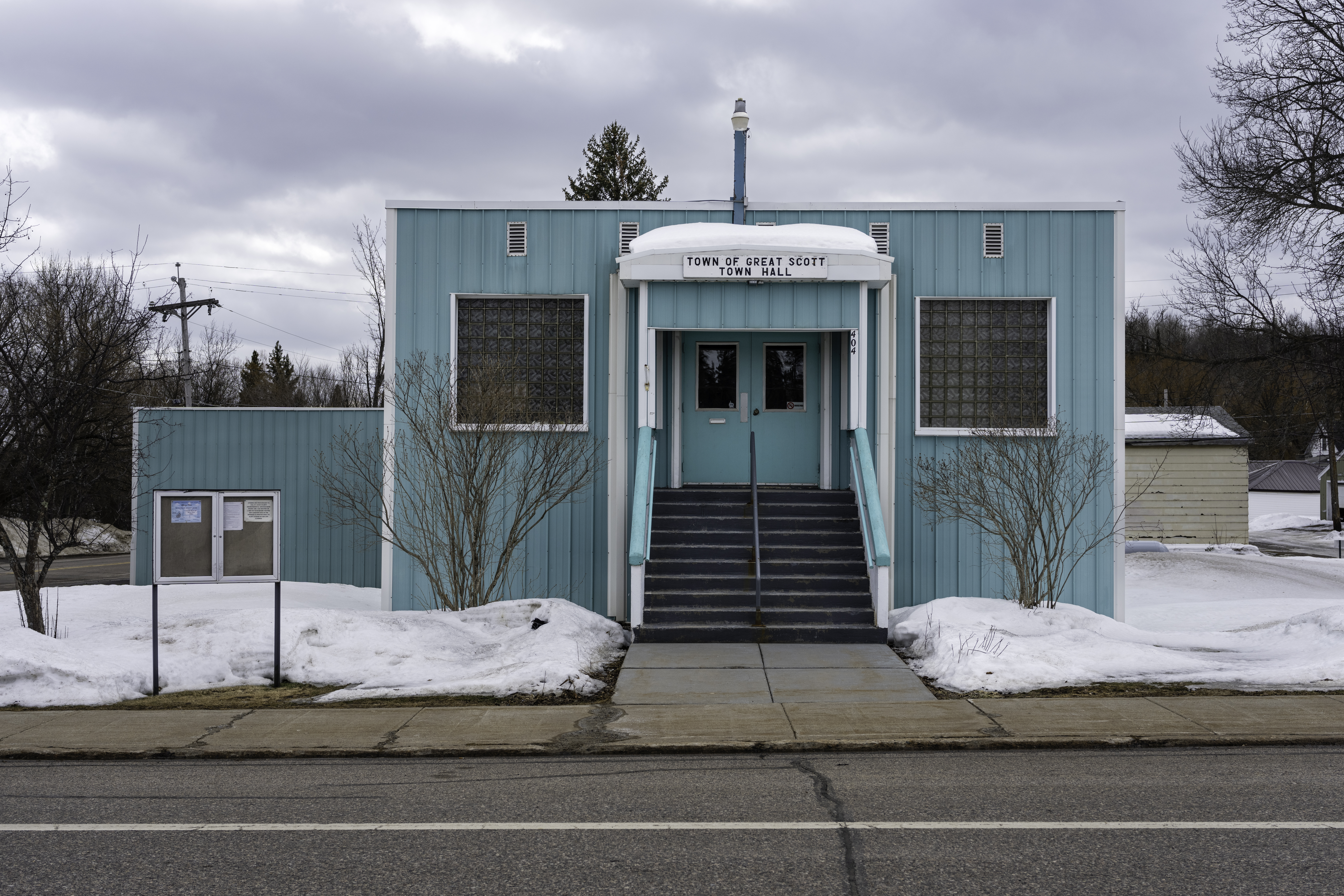
- Great Scott Town Hall

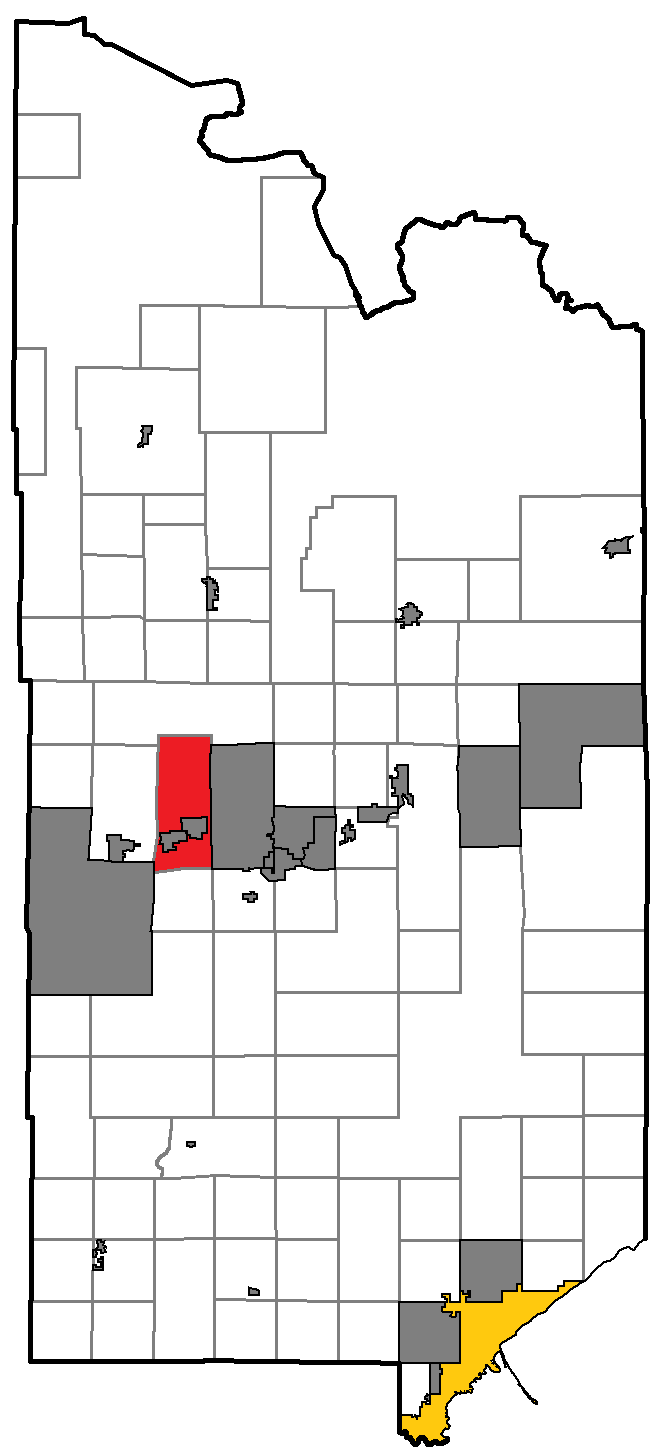
- Location of Great Scott Township within St. Louis County, Minnesota
- Coordinates: 47°31′37″N 92°44′27″W
- Country: United States
- State: Minnesota
- County: Saint Louis

Area
  - Total: 64.4 sq mi (166.9 km^{2})
  - Land: 63.1 sq mi (163.4 km^{2})
  - Water: 1.4 sq mi (3.5 km^{2})
- Elevation: 1,512 ft (461 m)

Population (2020)
  - Total: 426
  - Density: 6.75/sq mi (2.61/km^{2})
- Time zone: UTC-6 (Central (CST))
  - Summer (DST): UTC-5 (CDT)
- FIPS code: 27-25550
- GNIS feature ID: 0664335
- Website: https://www.greatscotttownship.org/

Great Scott Township is a township in Saint Louis County, Minnesota, United States. The population was 426 at the 2020 census.

U.S. Highway 169 and Saint Louis County Highway 25 (CR 25) are two of the main routes in the township. Highway 169 runs east–west throughout the township. CR 25 runs north–south through the township.

The cities of Buhl and Kinney are both located within Great Scott Township geographically but are separate entities. Buhl and Kinney are politically independent of the township.

== Name ==
The township was named by the board of county commissioners. Great Scott was a favorite oath of one of the commissioners, and the name was granted in a moment of irreverent humor.

== Geography ==
According to the United States Census Bureau, the township has a total area of 64.4 square miles (167 km^{2}); 63.1 square miles (163 km^{2}) is land and 1.3 square miles (3.4 km^{2}), or 2.08%, is water.

The Dark River, McNiven Creek, and Slow Creek all flow through the northern portion of Great Scott Township.

=== Adjacent townships, cities, and communities ===
The following are adjacent to Great Scott Township :

- Balkan Township (west)
- The city of Chisholm (west)
- The city of Hibbing (southwest)
- Cherry Township (south)
- Clinton Township (southeast)
- Iron Junction (southeast)
- The city of Mountain Iron (east)
- The unincorporated area of Britt (northeast)
- Leander Lake Unorganized Territory (north)

Spirit Lake Road runs north–south along Great Scott Township's eastern boundary line with adjacent city of Mountain Iron in the southeast corner of Great Scott Township.

Ralph Road runs north–south along Great Scott Township's eastern boundary line with adjacent city of Mountain Iron in the northeast corner of Great Scott Township.

Hayes Road runs east–west along Great Scott Township's southern boundary line with adjacent Cherry Township in the southwest corner of Great Scott Township.

Barrett Road runs north–south along Great Scott Township's western boundary line with adjacent Balkan Township in the northwest corner of Great Scott Township.

McNiven Road enters the west–central part of Great Scott Township, running east–west, continuing to its intersection with County 25 (Smith Road).

== Demographics ==
As of the census of 2000, there were 622 people, 242 households, and 171 families residing in the township. The population density was 9.9 inhabitants per square mile (3.8/km^{2}). There were 275 housing units at an average density of 4.4 per square mile (1.7/km^{2}). The racial makeup of the township was 96.14% White, 0.96% Native American, 0.16% from other races, and 2.73% from two or more races. Hispanic or Latino of any race were 2.25% of the population.

There were 242 households, out of which 29.8% had children under the age of 18 living with them, 60.7% were married couples living together, 5.4% had a female householder with no husband present, and 29.3% were non-families. 25.2% of all households were made up of individuals, and 9.1% had someone living alone who was 65 years of age or older. The average household size was 2.56 and the average family size was 3.02.

In the township the population was spread out, with 25.9% under the age of 18, 6.6% from 18 to 24, 24.9% from 25 to 44, 29.7% from 45 to 64, and 12.9% who were 65 years of age or older. The median age was 41 years. For every 100 females, there were 102.6 males. For every 100 females age 18 and over, there were 99.6 males.

The median income for a household in the township was $38,438, and the median income for a family was $51,618. Males had a median income of $41,458 versus $23,906 for females. The per capita income for the township was $18,106. About 9.9% of families and 12.5% of the population were below the poverty line, including 18.9% of those under age 18 and 4.4% of those age 65 or over.
