= Fermoy, Minnesota =

Ghost town in Minnesota, United States

Fermoy
- Ghost town
- Location within Minnesota
- Coordinates: 47°12′42″N 92°36′11″W
- Country: United States
- State: Minnesota
- County: Saint Louis
- Time zone: UTC-6 (Central (CST))
  - Summer (DST): UTC-5 (CDT)
- Area code: 218
- GNIS feature ID: 662374

Fermoy is an abandoned townsite in McDavitt Township, Saint Louis County, Minnesota, United States. It was located near the communities of Sax and Kelsey. Fermoy was near the intersection of Kolu Road (County Road 207), Cranberry Lane (County Road 788), and Admiral Road South. Saint Louis County Highway 7 (CR 7) is nearby.

Fermoy was a station and junction of the Great Northern Railway, four miles north of Kelsey, in section 28, of McDavitt Township. Fermoy Wildlife Management Area is nearby.
