= East Two River =

- Mouth of the East Two River

Location
- Country: United States
- State: Minnesota
- County: St. Louis County

Physical characteristics
- Source
  - location: Eveleth
  - coordinates: 47.4888166°N 92.5999051°W
- Mouth
  - location: Casco
  - coordinates: 47.3402104°N 92.6671319°W
- Length: 25.0-mile-long (40.2 km)

Basin features
- River system: Saint Louis River

The East Two River is a 25.0-mile-long (40.2 km) tributary of the Saint Louis River in northern Minnesota, United States. It rises at the outlet of Silver Lake in the city of Virginia and flows southwest, joining the Saint Louis River in McDavitt Township, just upstream of the outlet of the West Two River.

== See also ==
- List of rivers of Minnesota
