= Ramshaw, Minnesota =

Ramshaw
- Unincorporated community
- Location within Minnesota Location within the United States
- Coordinates: 47°25′39″N 92°34′53″W
- Country: United States
- State: Minnesota
- County: Saint Louis
- Township: Clinton Township
- Elevation: 1,411 ft (430 m)

Population
  - Total: 20
- Time zone: UTC-6 (Central (CST))
  - Summer (DST): UTC-5 (CDT)
- ZIP code: 55751
- Area code: 218
- GNIS feature ID: 662247

Ramshaw is an unincorporated community in Clinton Township, Saint Louis County, Minnesota, United States.

The community is located southwest of Eveleth at the junction of Saint Louis County Road 776 (Old Mesabe Road) and County Road 755 (Ramshaw Road).

Iron Junction is nearby. Saint Louis County Highway 7 is also in the vicinity.
