= Melrude, Minnesota =

Melrude
- Unincorporated community
- Location within Minnesota Location within the United States
- Coordinates: 47°14′44″N 92°25′02″W
- Country: United States
- State: Minnesota
- County: Saint Louis
- Township: Ellsburg Township
- Elevation: 1,345 ft (410 m)

Population
  - Total: 10
- Time zone: UTC-6 (Central (CST))
  - Summer (DST): UTC-5 (CDT)
- ZIP code: 55766
- Area code: 218
- GNIS feature ID: 661905

Melrude is an unincorporated community in Ellsburg Township, Saint Louis County, Minnesota, United States.

The community is located eight miles northeast of Cotton at the intersection of Saint Louis County Road 59 (Melrude Road) and County Road 322 (Lee Road).

Paleface Creek flows through the community, and the Paleface River is nearby.
