= Eldes Corner, Minnesota =

Eldes Corner
- Unincorporated community
- Location within Minnesota Location within the United States
- Coordinates: 46°42′36″N 92°16′48″W
- Country: United States
- State: Minnesota
- County: St. Louis
- Elevation: 1,161 ft (354 m)
- Time zone: UTC-6 (Central (CST))
  - Summer (DST): UTC-5 (CDT)
- Area code: 218
- GNIS feature ID: 661198

Eldes Corner is an unincorporated community in Saint Louis County, Minnesota, United States.

The community is located 11 miles southwest of the city of Duluth at the junction of Midway Road (County 13) and Old Highway 61 (now County Road 73).

Interstate Highway 35 is nearby.

Eldes Corner is located within Midway Township.
