= Leander Lake, Minnesota =

Unorganized territory in St. Louis County, Minnesota, United States

Coordinates: 47°40′50″N 92°44′42″W

Leander Lake is an unorganized territory in Saint Louis County, Minnesota, United States, located near Britt and Great Scott Township. The population was 119 at the 2000 census.

== Geography ==
According to the United States Census Bureau, the unorganized territory has a total area of 25.3 square miles (65.5 km^{2}), of which 23.9 square miles (61.9 km^{2}) is land and 1.4 square miles (3.6 km^{2}) (5.49%) is water.

== Demographics ==
At the 2000 United States census, there were 119 people, 51 households, and 39 families living in the unorganized territory. The population density was 5.0 inhabitants per square mile (1.9/km^{2}). There were 176 housing units at an average density of 7.4 per square mile (2.9/km^{2}). The racial makeup of the unorganized territory was 98.32% White, 0.84% Native American, and 0.84% from two or more races. Of the 51 households, 17.6% had children under the age of 18 living with them, 70.6% were married couples living together, and 21.6% were non-families. 17.6% of households were one person and 2.0% were one person aged 65 or older. The average household size was 2.33 and the average family size was 2.65.

The age distribution was 10.1% under the age of 18, 6.7% from 18 to 24, 25.2% from 25 to 44, 37.8% from 45 to 64, and 20.2% 65 or older. The median age was 50 years. For every 100 females, there were 128.8 males. For every 100 females age 18 and over, there were 137.8 males.

The median household income was $24,750 and the median family income was $24,531. Males had a median income of $21,875 versus $9,583 for females. The per capita income for the unorganized territory was $14,339. There were 21.6% of families and 15.4% of the population living below the poverty line, including no under eighteens and 28.9% of those over 64.
