= Camp 5 Township, St. Louis County, Minnesota =

Camp 5 Township, Minnesota
- Township
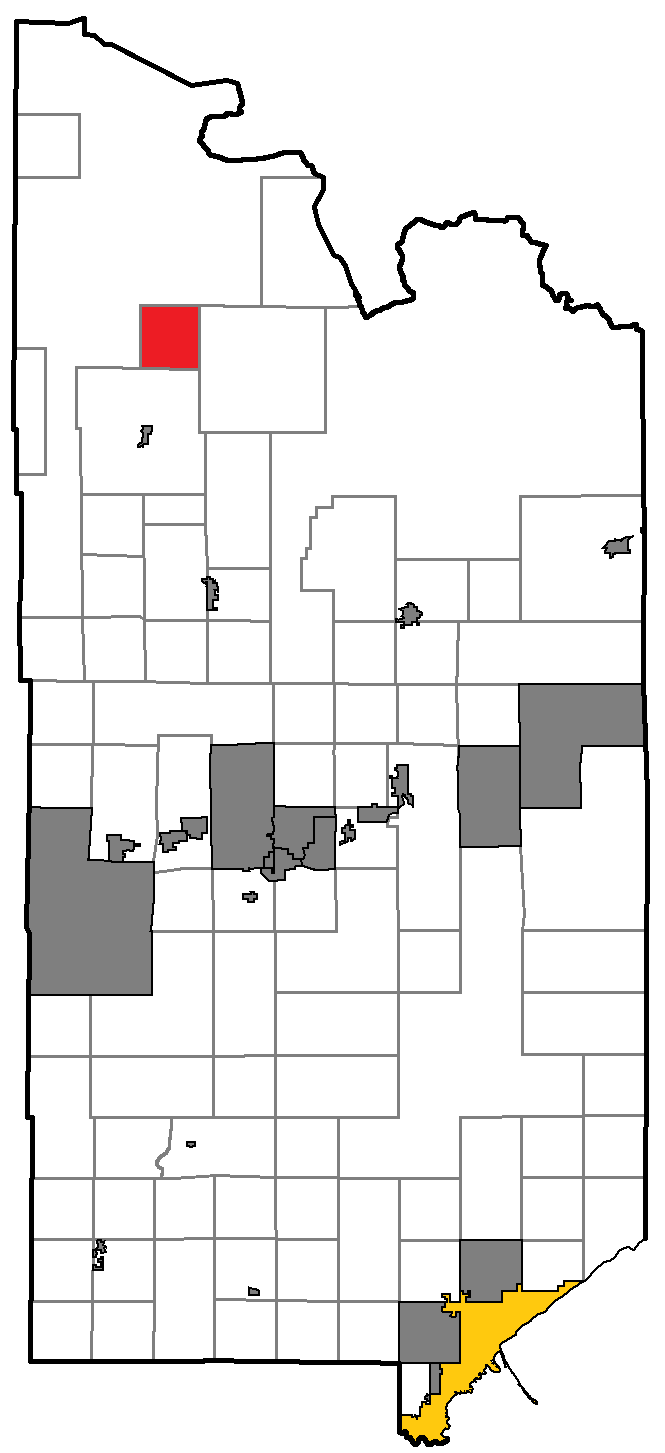
- Location of Camp 5 Township within St. Louis County, Minnesota
- Coordinates: 48°11′43″N 92°46′33″W
- Country: United States
- State: Minnesota
- County: Saint Louis

Area
  - Total: 91 km^{2} (35.1 sq mi)
  - Land: 81 km^{2} (31.4 sq mi)
  - Water: 9.6 km^{2} (3.7 sq mi)

Population (2020)
  - Total: 22
  - Density: 0.27/km^{2} (0.70/sq mi)
- Time zone: UTC-6 (Central (CST))
  - Summer (DST): UTC-5 (CST)
- Area code: 218
- FIPS code: 27-09482
- GNIS feature ID: 2397778

Camp 5 Township is a township in Saint Louis County, Minnesota, United States. The population was 22 at the 2020 census.

== Geography ==
According to the United States Census Bureau, the township has a total area of 35.1 square miles (91 km^{2}); 31.4 square miles (81 km^{2}) is land and 3.7 square miles (9.6 km^{2}), or 10.44%, is water.

== Demographics ==
At the 2000 census there were 41 people, 23 households, and 12 families living in the township. The population density was 1.3 people per square mile (0.5/km^{2}). There were 130 housing units at an average density of 4.1/sq mi (1.6/km^{2}). The racial makeup of the township was 100.00% White. Of the 23 households 4.3% had children under the age of 18 living with them, 52.2% were married couples living together, and 43.5% were non-families. 43.5% of households were one person and 17.4% were one person aged 65 or older. The average household size was 1.78 and the average family size was 2.23.

The age distribution was 7.3% under the age of 18, 4.9% from 25 to 44, 46.3% from 45 to 64, and 41.5% 65 or older. The median age was 63 years. For every 100 females, there were 141.2 males. For every 100 females age 18 and over, there were 153.3 males.

The median household income was $21,071 and the median family income was $45,750. Males had a median income of $33,750 versus $11,250 for females. The per capita income for the township was $17,784. There were no families and 9.7% of the population living below the poverty line, including no under eighteens and none of those over 64.
