= Leonidas, Minnesota =

City in Minnesota, United States

Leonidas
- City
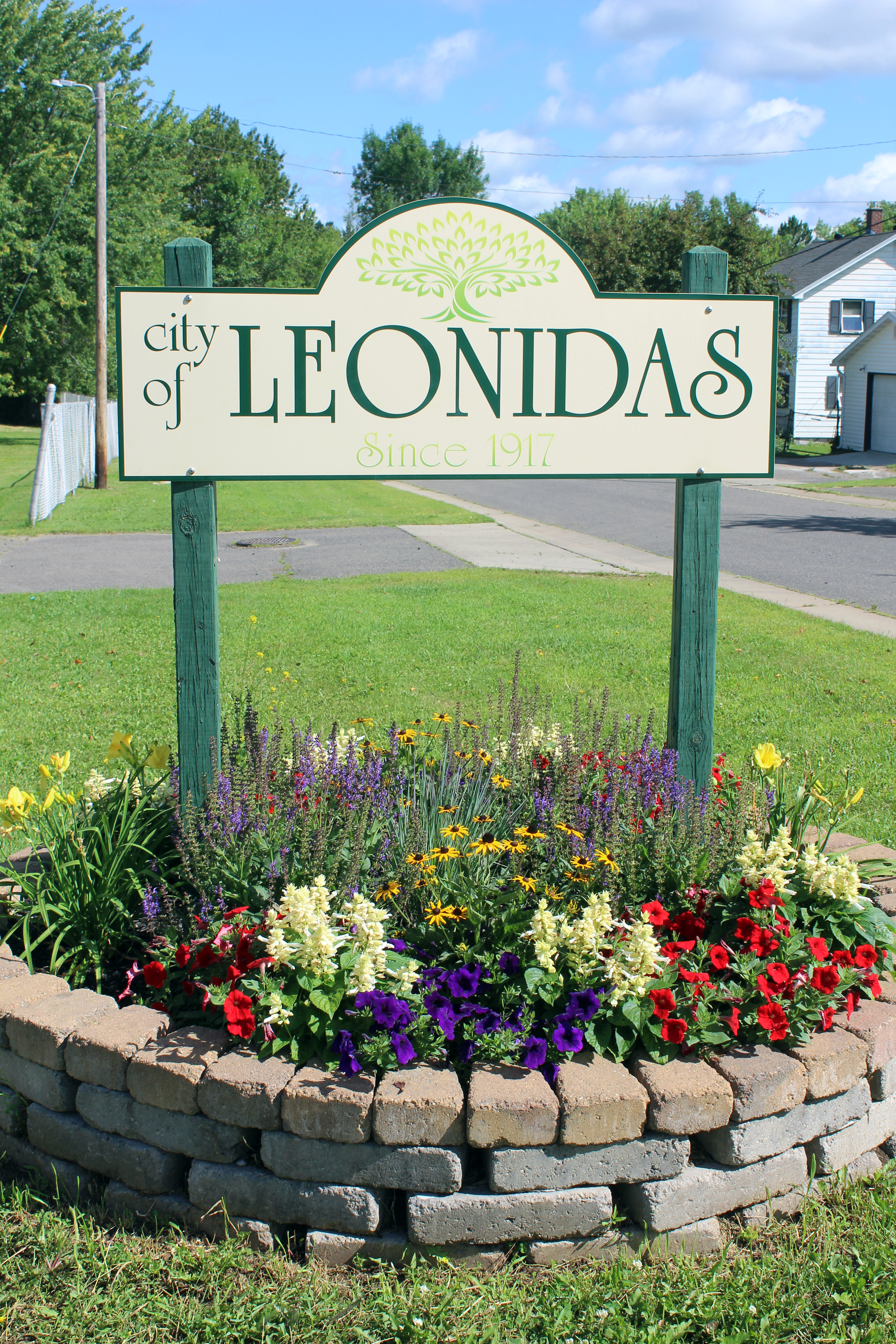
- Welcome sign

- Location of the city of Leonidas within Saint Louis County, Minnesota
- Coordinates: 47°28′5″N 92°34′5″W
- Country: United States
- State: Minnesota
- County: Saint Louis

Area
  - Total: 1.38 sq mi (3.58 km^{2})
  - Land: 1.32 sq mi (3.43 km^{2})
  - Water: 0.058 sq mi (0.15 km^{2})
- Elevation: 1,440 ft (440 m)

Population (2020)
  - Total: 50
  - Density: 37.7/sq mi (14.56/km^{2})
- Time zone: UTC-6 (Central (CST))
  - Summer (DST): UTC-5 (CDT)
- Area code: 218
- FIPS code: 27-36530
- GNIS feature ID: 0661705
- Website: https://cityofleonidas.com/

Leonidas is a city in Saint Louis County, Minnesota, United States. The population was 50 at the 2020 census.

Saint Louis County Roads 101 and 755, 1st Street, and 13th Avenue West are the main routes in the community. The city of Leonidas is located immediately west of the city of Eveleth.

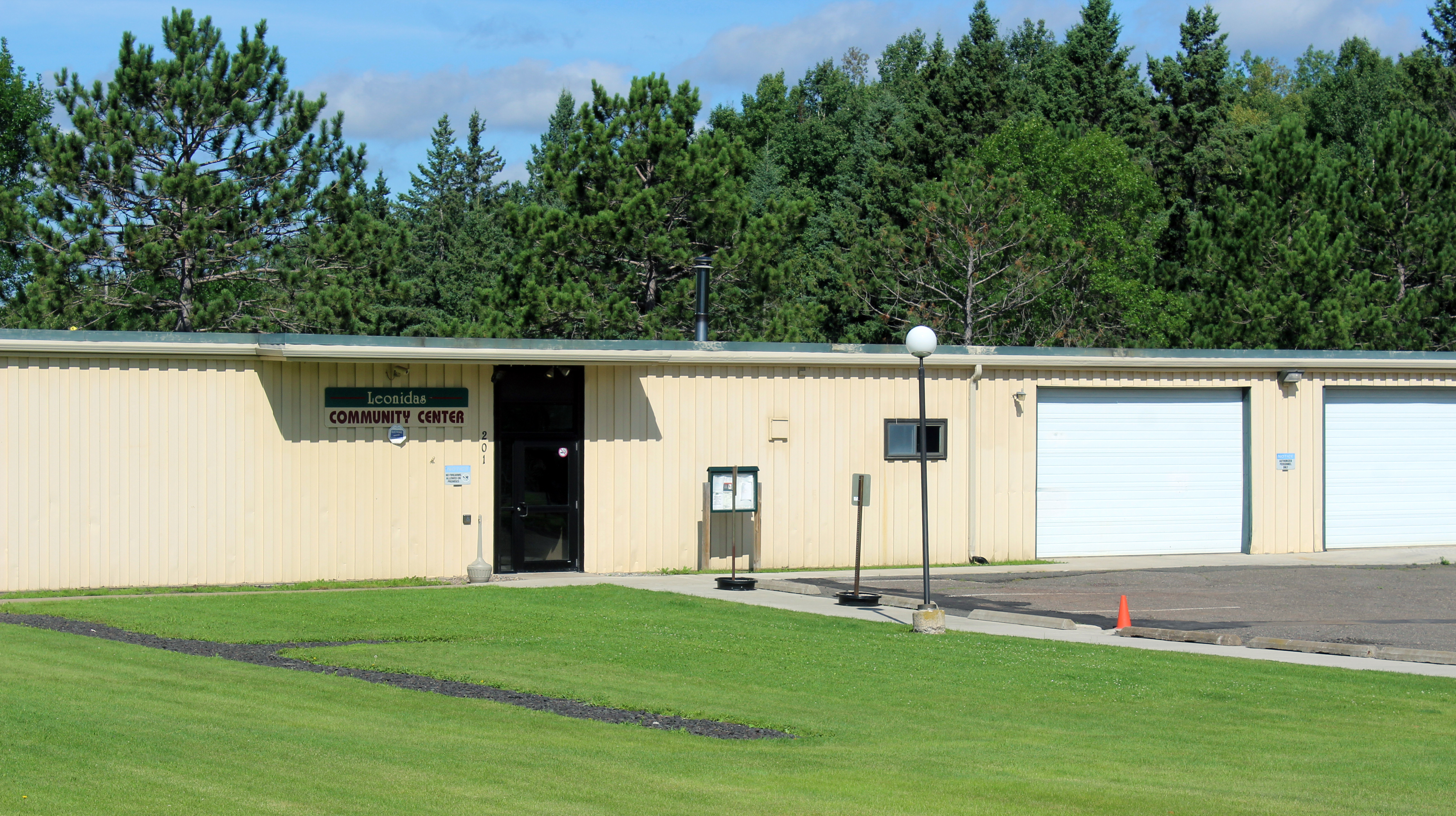
Community Center

== Geography ==
According to the United States Census Bureau, the city has a total area of 1.44 square miles (3.73 km^{2}); 1.28 square miles (3.32 km^{2}) is land and 0.16 square miles (0.41 km^{2}) is water.

Leonidas is adjacent to the neighborhood of West Eveleth.

== Demographics ==
Historical population
Census	Pop.	Note	%±
1920	457		—
1930	499		9.2%
1940	440		−11.8%
1950	88		−80.0%
1960	94		6.8%
1970	157		67.0%
1980	95		−39.5%
1990	70		−26.3%
2000	60		−14.3%
2010	52		−13.3%
2020	50		−3.8%
U.S. Decennial Census

=== 2010 census ===
As of the census of 2010, there were 52 people, 24 households, and 13 families living in the city. The population density was 40.6 inhabitants per square mile (15.7/km^{2}). There were 27 housing units at an average density of 21.1 per square mile (8.1/km^{2}). The racial makeup of the city was 96.2% White, 1.9% Native American, and 1.9% from two or more races.

There were 24 households, of which 25.0% had children under the age of 18 living with them, 50.0% were married couples living together, 4.2% had a female householder with no husband present, and 45.8% were non-families. 37.5% of all households were made up of individuals, and 8.3% had someone living alone who was 65 years of age or older. The average household size was 2.17 and the average family size was 2.92.

The median age in the city was 46.5 years. 21.2% of residents were under the age of 18; 3.7% were between the ages of 18 and 24; 23% were from 25 to 44; 40.3% were from 45 to 64; and 11.5% were 65 years of age or older. The gender makeup of the city was 48.1% male and 51.9% female.

=== 2000 census ===
As of the census of 2000, there were 60 people, 26 households, and 19 families living in the city. The population density was 45.1 inhabitants per square mile (17.4/km^{2}). There were 27 housing units at an average density of 20.3 per square mile (7.8/km^{2}). The racial makeup of the city was 98.33% White, and 1.67% from two or more races. 55.9% were of Swedish, 17.6% German and 11.8% Finnish ancestry.

There were 26 households, out of which 34.6% had children under the age of 18 living with them, 57.7% were married couples living together, 3.8% had a female householder with no husband present, and 26.9% were non-families. 15.4% of all households were made up of individuals, and 7.7% had someone living alone who was 65 years of age or older. The average household size was 2.31 and the average family size was 2.58.

In the city, the population was spread out, with 23.3% under the age of 18, 10.0% from 18 to 24, 23.3% from 25 to 44, 30.0% from 45 to 64, and 13.3% who were 65 years of age or older. The median age was 42 years. For every 100 females, there were 100.0 males. For every 100 females age 18 and over, there were 100.0 males.

The median income for a household in the city was $19,167, and the median income for a family was $19,583. Males had a median income of $31,250 versus $40,000 for females. The per capita income for the city was $15,023. There were 20.0% of families and 14.3% of the population living below the poverty line, including 10.0% of under eighteens and 14.3% of those over 64.
