= Sax, Minnesota =

Sax
- Unincorporated community
- Location within Minnesota Location within the United States
- Coordinates: 47°12′42″N 92°36′11″W
- Country: United States
- State: Minnesota
- County: Saint Louis
- Township: McDavitt Township
- Elevation: 1,309 ft (399 m)

Population
  - Total: 10
- Time zone: UTC-6 (Central (CST))
  - Summer (DST): UTC-5 (CDT)
- ZIP codes: 55738
- Area code: 218
- GNIS feature ID: 662374

Sax is an unincorporated community in McDavitt Township, Saint Louis County, Minnesota, United States.

== Geography ==
The community is located 9 mi (14 km) northwest of Cotton at the intersection of Saint Louis County Highway 7 (CR 7) and County Road 28 (Sax Road). County Road 52 (Arkola Road) is nearby.

== History ==
A post office called Sax was established in 1916, and remained in operation until 1930. The community was named for Solomon Saxe, an original owner of the town site.

== Arts and culture ==
The nearby Sax–Zim Bog area is known as a birdwatching area and is listed by the National Audubon Society as an Important Bird Area, "a designation reserved for the best bird habitats in the world". The area is also the site of the annual Sax–Zim Winter Birding Festival held in February. The bog was named for the two nearby communities of Sax and Zim.
