= West Two River =

West Two RIver
- Mouth of the

Location
- Country: United States
- State: Minnesota
- County: St. Louis County

Physical characteristics
- Source
  - location: Kinney
  - coordinates: 47.5340937°N 92.6662925°W
- Mouth
  - location: Casco
  - coordinates: 47°20′12″N 92°40′14″W

Basin features
- River system: Saint Louis River

The West Two River is a 26.5-mile-long (42.6 km) tributary of the Saint Louis River in northern Minnesota, United States. It rises west of the city of Mountain Iron and flows south, reaching the Saint Louis River in McDavitt Township.

== See also ==
- List of rivers of Minnesota
