= Zim, Minnesota =

Zim
- Unincorporated community
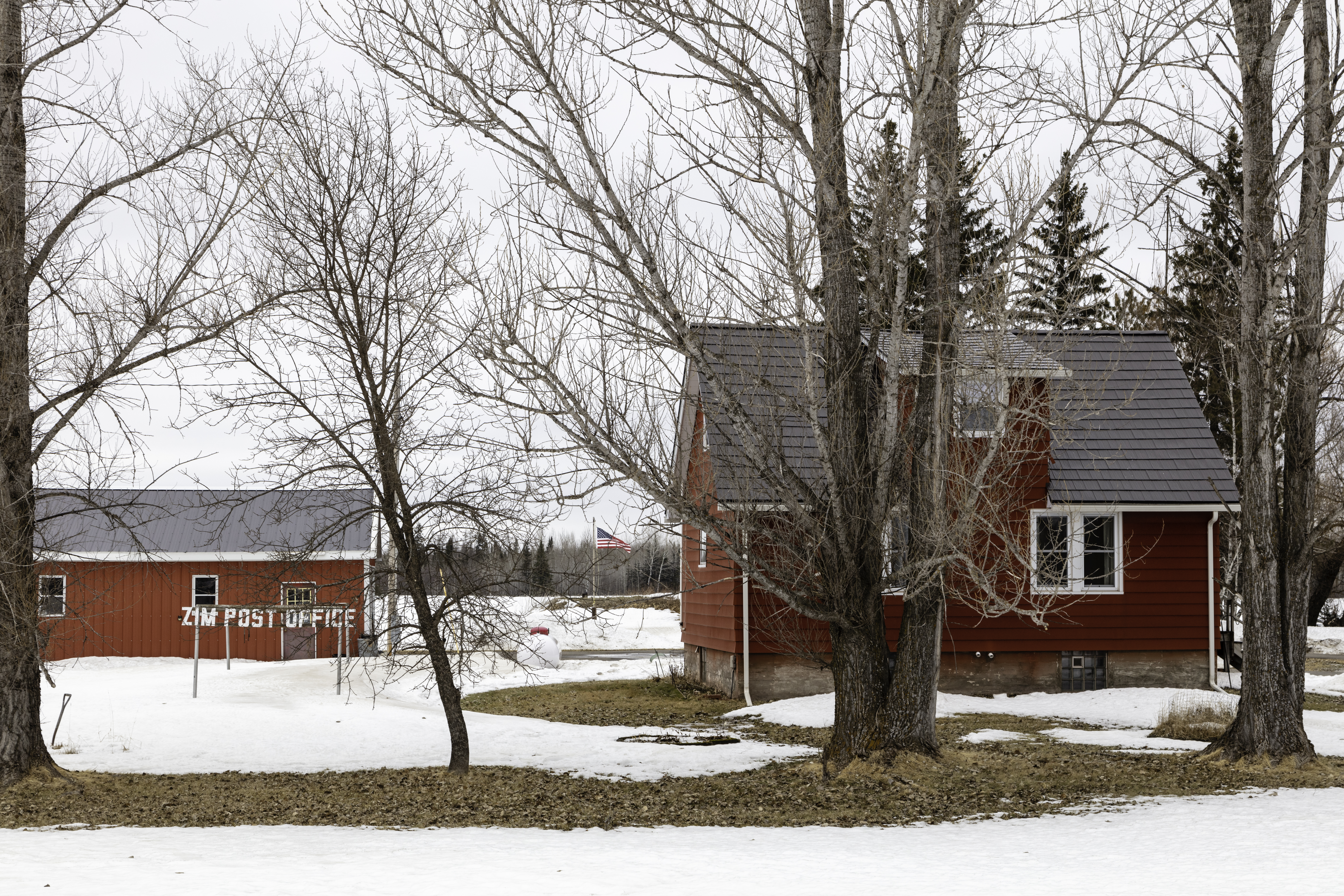
- The Zim Post Office

- Location within Minnesota Location within the United States
- Coordinates: 47°18′25″N 92°36′12″W
- Country: United States
- State: Minnesota
- County: Saint Louis
- Township: McDavitt Township
- Elevation: 1,335 ft (407 m)

Population
  - Total: 20
- Time zone: UTC-6 (Central (CST))
  - Summer (DST): UTC-5 (CDT)
- ZIP code: 55738
- Area code: 218
- GNIS feature ID: 662843

Zim is an unincorporated place in McDavitt Township, St. Louis County, Minnesota, United States.

== Geography ==
The community is located 14 miles southwest of the city of Eveleth at the junction of Saint Louis County Highway 7 and County Road 27. The Saint Louis River is nearby.

== History ==
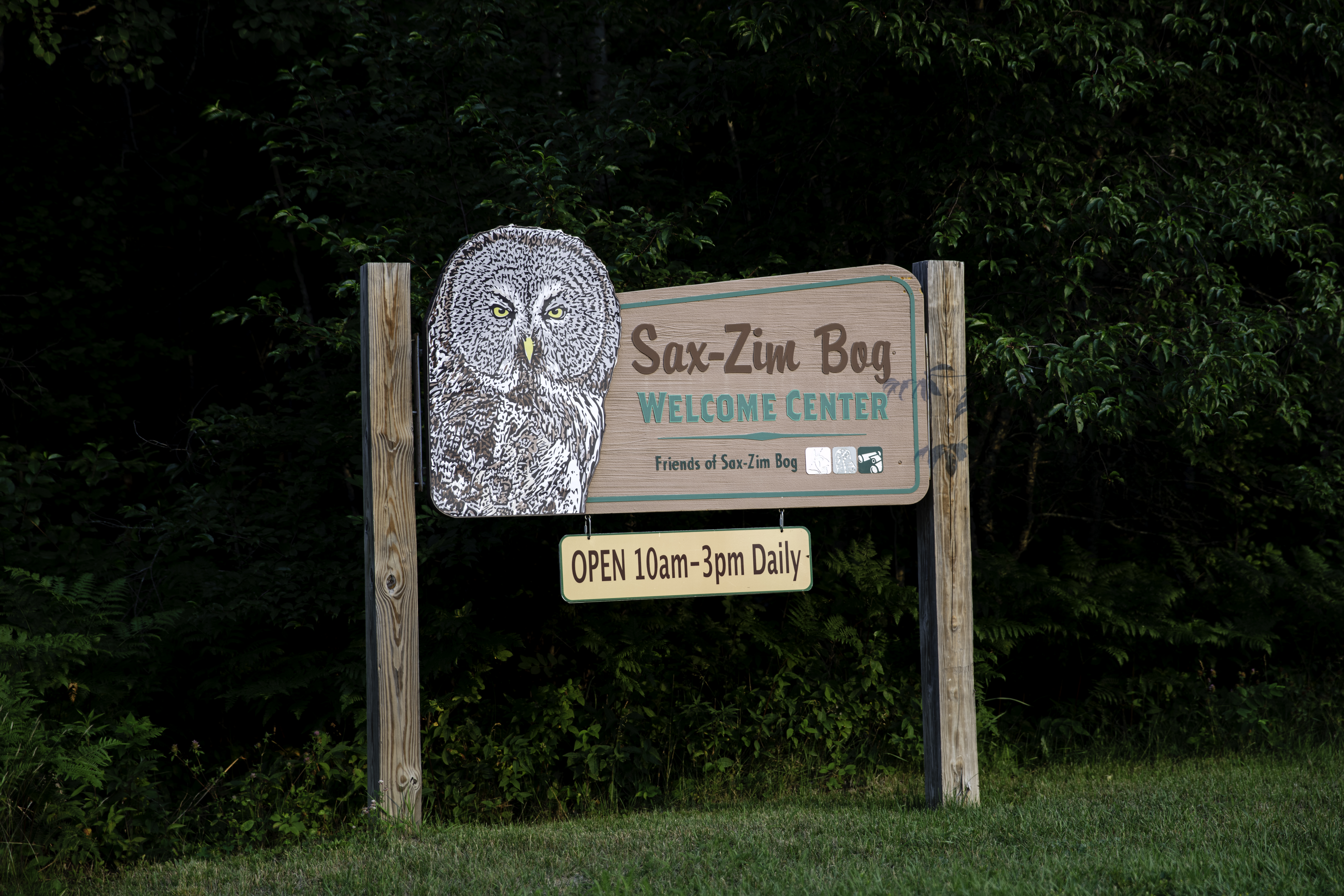
Sax-Zim Bog Welcome Center sign

A post office called Zim was established in 1899, and remained in operation until 1990. The community derives its name from a logging camp run by a lumberman named Zimmerman who worked in the area.

== Arts and culture ==
The nearby Sax–Zim Bog area is home to one of the world's best birdwatching places and the site of the annual Sax–Zim Winter Birding Festival held in February. The bog was named for Zim and the nearby community of Sax.

Zim is home to noted rock music transcriber Jordan Baker, who has authored songbooks for Dream Theater, Steve Vai and Metallica.
