= St. Louis County, Minnesota =

County in Minnesota, United States

- County
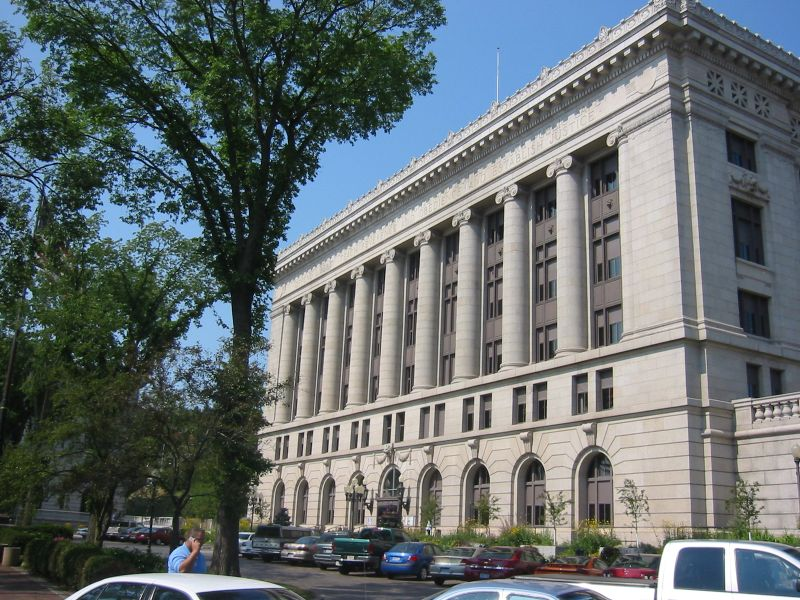
- St. Louis County Courthouse in Duluth

- Location within the U.S. state of Minnesota
- Coordinates: 47°35′N 92°28′W
- Country: United States
- State: Minnesota
- Founded: February 20, 1855
- Named for: St. Louis River
- Seat: Duluth
- Largest city: Duluth

Area
  - Total: 6,860 sq mi (17,800 km^{2})
  - Land: 6,247 sq mi (16,180 km^{2})
  - Water: 612 sq mi (1,590 km^{2}) 8.9%

Population (2020)
  - Total: 200,231
  - Estimate (2025): 200,518 ▲
  - Density: 32.05/sq mi (12.38/km^{2})
- Time zone: UTC−6 (Central)
  - Summer (DST): UTC−5 (CDT)
- Congressional district: 8th
- Website: www.stlouiscountymn.gov

St. Louis County is a county in the Arrowhead Region of Minnesota. As of the 2020 census, its population was 200,231. Its county seat is Duluth. It is the largest county in Minnesota by land area and the largest in the United States east of the Mississippi River by total area. The county is part of the Duluth, MN–WI metropolitan statistical area.

Major industries include pulpwood production and tourism. Open pit mining of taconite and processing it into high grade iron ore remains an important part of the economy of the Iron Range and is directly tied to shipping in the twin ports of Duluth and Superior. Parts of the federally recognized Bois Forte and Fond du Lac Indian reservations are in the county.

== History ==
This area was long inhabited by Algonquian-speaking tribes: the Ojibwe (Chippewa), Ottawa and Potawatomi peoples were loosely affiliated in the Council of Three Fires. As American settlers entered the territory, the Native Americans were pushed to outer areas.

The Minnesota Legislature established St. Louis County on February 20, 1855, as Doty County, and changed its name to Newton County on March 3, 1855. It originally consisted of the area east and south of the St. Louis River, while the area east of the Vermilion River and north of the St. Louis River was part of Superior County. Superior County was renamed St. Louis County.

On March 1, 1856, that St. Louis County was renamed as Lake County. Newton County was renamed as St. Louis County and had that eastern area added to it; it was also expanded westward by incorporating parts of Itasca County, which then also included most of Carlton County. On May 23, 1857, St. Louis County took its current shape when Carlton County was formed from parts of St. Louis and Pine counties.

== Geography ==
According to the United States Census Bureau, the county has a total area of 6,860 square miles (17,800 km^{2}), of which 6,247 square miles (16,180 km^{2}) is land and 612 square miles (1,590 km^{2}) (8.9%) is water. It is the largest county in Minnesota and the largest (by total area) in the United States east of the Mississippi River. St. Louis County is the only county in the United States which has a coastline and borders both another country and another state.

Voyageurs National Park, established in 1975, is located in its northwestern corner, on the south shore of Rainy Lake on the Canada–US border; it is popular with water enthusiasts and fishers. The county includes parts of Superior National Forest, established in 1909, and the Boundary Waters Canoe Area Wilderness on the border, established in 1978. The BWCAW is a 1,090,000-acre (4,400 km^{2}) wilderness area designated for fishing, camping, hiking, and canoeing, and is one of the most visited wilderness areas in the United States. St. Louis County has more than 500 lakes. The largest lakes are Pelican and Vermilion.

The "Hill of Three Waters" on the Laurentian Divide lies northeast of Hibbing. Rainfall on this hill runs to three watersheds: Hudson Bay to the north, the Gulf of Saint Lawrence to the east (via Lake Superior), or the Gulf of Mexico to the south and west (via the Mississippi River). The county is drained by the St. Louis, Vermilion, and other rivers.

Duluth on Lake Superior is one of the most important fresh-water ports in the United States.

The county encompasses part of the Iron Range. It has had a significant taconite mining industry, with active mines located in Hibbing, Mountain Iron, Eveleth, Virginia, and Babbitt, in addition to Keewatin in Itasca County.

=== Major highways ===
- Interstate 35
- Interstate 535 – John Blatnik Bridge
- U.S. Highway 2
- U.S. Highway 53
- U.S. Highway 169
- Minnesota State Highway 1
- Minnesota State Highway 23
- Minnesota State Highway 33
- Minnesota State Highway 37
- Minnesota State Highway 39 – McCuen Street
- Minnesota State Highway 61 – North Shore
- Minnesota State Highway 73
- Minnesota State Highway 135
- Minnesota State Highway 169
- Minnesota State Highway 194
- Minnesota State Highway 210
- St. Louis County Road 4 - Rice Lake Road
- St. Louis County Road 13 – Midway Road

=== Adjacent counties ===
- Rainy River District, Ontario, Canada (north)
- Lake County (east)
- Douglas County, Wisconsin (southeast)
- Carlton County (south)
- Aitkin County (southwest)
- Itasca County (west)
- Koochiching County (northwest)

=== National protected areas ===
- Superior National Forest (part)
  - Boundary Waters Canoe Area Wilderness (part)
- Voyageurs National Park (part)

== Climate and weather ==
The county has a humid continental climate (Köppen Dfb), slightly moderated by its proximity to Lake Superior. Winters are long, snowy, and very cold, normally seeing maximum temperatures remaining below 32 °F (0 °C) on 106 days. Due to global warming, in January 2019 Tracy Twine, professor at the University of Minnesota's Department of Soil, Water and Climate, said "we just don't expect temperatures to be below 10 degrees Fahrenheit in Duluth anymore." Public schools and other government offices shut down on January 29–30, 2019 because of wind chills of −70 °F or −56.7 °C. This apparent anomaly was attributed to changes in the global jet stream due to the climate change.

== Demographics ==
Historical population
Census	Pop.	Note	%±
1860	406		—
1870	4,561		1,023.4%
1880	4,504		−1.2%
1890	44,862		896.0%
1900	82,932		84.9%
1910	163,274		96.9%
1920	206,391		26.4%
1930	204,596		−0.9%
1940	206,917		1.1%
1950	206,062		−0.4%
1960	231,588		12.4%
1970	220,693		−4.7%
1980	222,229		0.7%
1990	198,213		−10.8%
2000	200,528		1.2%
2010	200,226		−0.2%
2020	200,231		0.0%
2025 (est.)	200,518	▲	0.1%
U.S. Decennial Census; 1790–1960 1900–1990; 1990–2000 2010–2020

=== 2020 census ===
As of the 2020 census, the county had a population of 200,231. The median age was 41.5 years. 19.1% of residents were under the age of 18 and 20.8% of residents were 65 years of age or older. For every 100 females there were 100.4 males, and for every 100 females age 18 and over there were 99.4 males age 18 and over.

The racial makeup of the county was 88.6% White, 2.1% Black or African American, 2.3% American Indian and Alaska Native, 1.0% Asian, <0.1% Native Hawaiian and Pacific Islander, 0.6% from some other race, and 5.5% from two or more races. Hispanic or Latino residents of any race comprised 1.8% of the population.

60.7% of residents lived in urban areas, while 39.3% lived in rural areas.

There were 86,540 households in the county, of which 22.8% had children under the age of 18 living in them. Of all households, 42.8% were married-couple households, 22.4% were households with a male householder and no spouse or partner present, and 26.7% were households with a female householder and no spouse or partner present. About 34.6% of all households were made up of individuals and 14.4% had someone living alone who was 65 years of age or older.

There were 103,681 housing units, of which 16.5% were vacant. Among occupied housing units, 69.6% were owner-occupied and 30.4% were renter-occupied. The homeowner vacancy rate was 1.3% and the rental vacancy rate was 7.5%.

=== Racial and ethnic composition ===
St. Louis County, Minnesota – Racial and ethnic composition Note: the US Census treats Hispanic/Latino as an ethnic category. This table excludes Latinos from the racial categories and assigns them to a separate category. Hispanics/Latinos may be of any race.
Race / Ethnicity (NH = Non-Hispanic)	Pop 1980	Pop 1990	Pop 2000	Pop 2010	Pop 2020	% 1980	% 1990	% 2000	% 2010	% 2020
White alone (NH)	216,694	191,447	189,314	184,769	176,112	97.51%	96.59%	94.41%	92.28%	87.95%
Black or African American alone (NH)	950	1,083	1,676	2,688	4,075	0.43%	0.55%	0.84%	1.34%	2.04%
Native American or Alaska Native alone (NH)	2,815	3,608	3,984	4,277	4,305	1.27%	1.82%	1.99%	2.14%	2.15%
Asian alone (NH)	802	1,063	1,327	1,760	1,901	0.36%	0.54%	0.66%	0.88%	0.95%
Native Hawaiian or Pacific Islander alone (NH)	x	x	50	60	58	x	x	0.02%	0.03%	0.03%
Other race alone (NH)	193	60	111	95	579	0.09%	0.03%	0.06%	0.05%	0.29%
Mixed race or Multiracial (NH)	x	x	2,469	4,168	9,598	x	x	1.23%	2.08%	4.79%
Hispanic or Latino (any race)	775	952	1,597	2,409	3,603	0.35%	0.48%	0.80%	1.20%	1.80%
Total	222,229	198,213	200,528	200,226	200,231	100.00%	100.00%	100.00%	100.00%	100.00%

=== 2010 census ===
As of the census of 2010, there were 200,226 people in the county. The racial makeup of the county was 94.0% White, 2.2% Native American, 0.4% Black or African American, 0.9% Asian, 0.2% of some other race and 2.3% of two or more races. 1.2% were Hispanic or Latino (of any race). According to the 2010–2015 American Community Survey, the ancestral makeup was 24.3% German, 15.9% Norwegian, 13.0% Swedish, and 10.2% Irish.

=== 2000 census ===
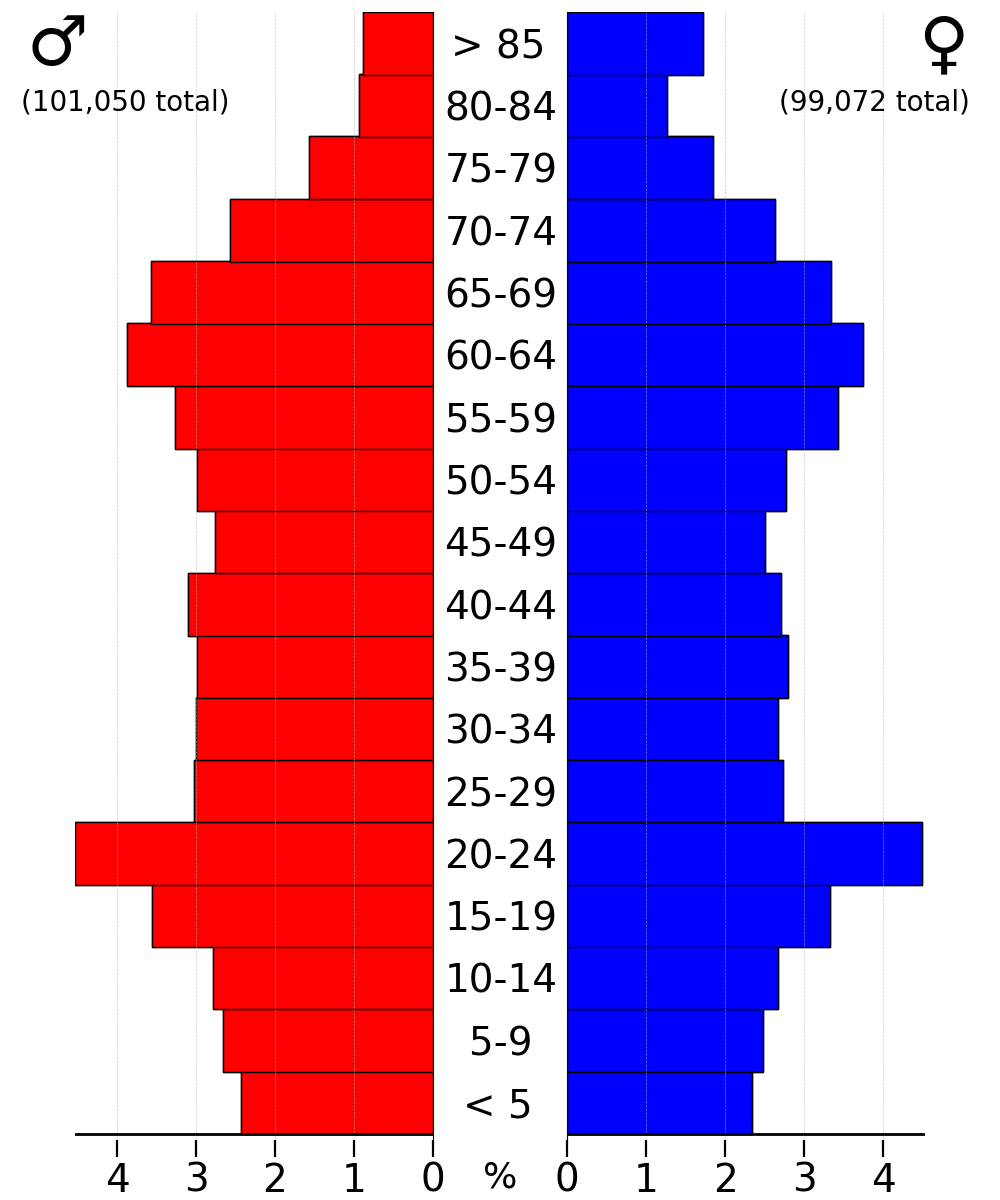
2022 US Census population pyramid for St. Louis County, from ACS 5-year estimates

As of the census of 2000, there were 200,528 people, 82,619 households, and 51,389 families in the county. The population density was 32 people per square mile (12 people/km^{2}). There were 95,800 housing units at an average density of 15 per square mile (5.8/km^{2}). The racial makeup of the county was 94.9% White, 0.9% Black or African American, 2.0% Native American, 0.7% Asian, nil% Pacific Islander, 0.2% from other races, and 1.4% from two or more races. 0.8% of the population were Hispanic or Latino of any race.

27.6% of households included children under the age of 18, 49.3% were married couples living together, 9.4% had a female householder with no husband present, and 37.8% were non-families. 31.2% of all households consisted of individuals, and 13.0% of individuals 65 years of age or older. The average household size was 2.32 and the average family size was 2.90.

The population contained 22.4% under the age of 18, 11.4% from 18 to 24, 25.9% from 25 to 44, 24.3% from 45 to 64, and 16.1% who were 65 years of age or older. The median age was 39 years. For every 100 females there were 96.8 males. For every 100 females age 18 and over, there were 93.8 males.

The median income for a household in the county was $36,306, and the median income for a family was $47,134. Males had a median income of $37,934 versus $24,235 for females. The per capita income for the county was $18,982. About 7.2% of families and 12.1% of the population were below the poverty line, including 13.1% of those under age 18 and 8.9% of those age 65 or over.

== Government ==
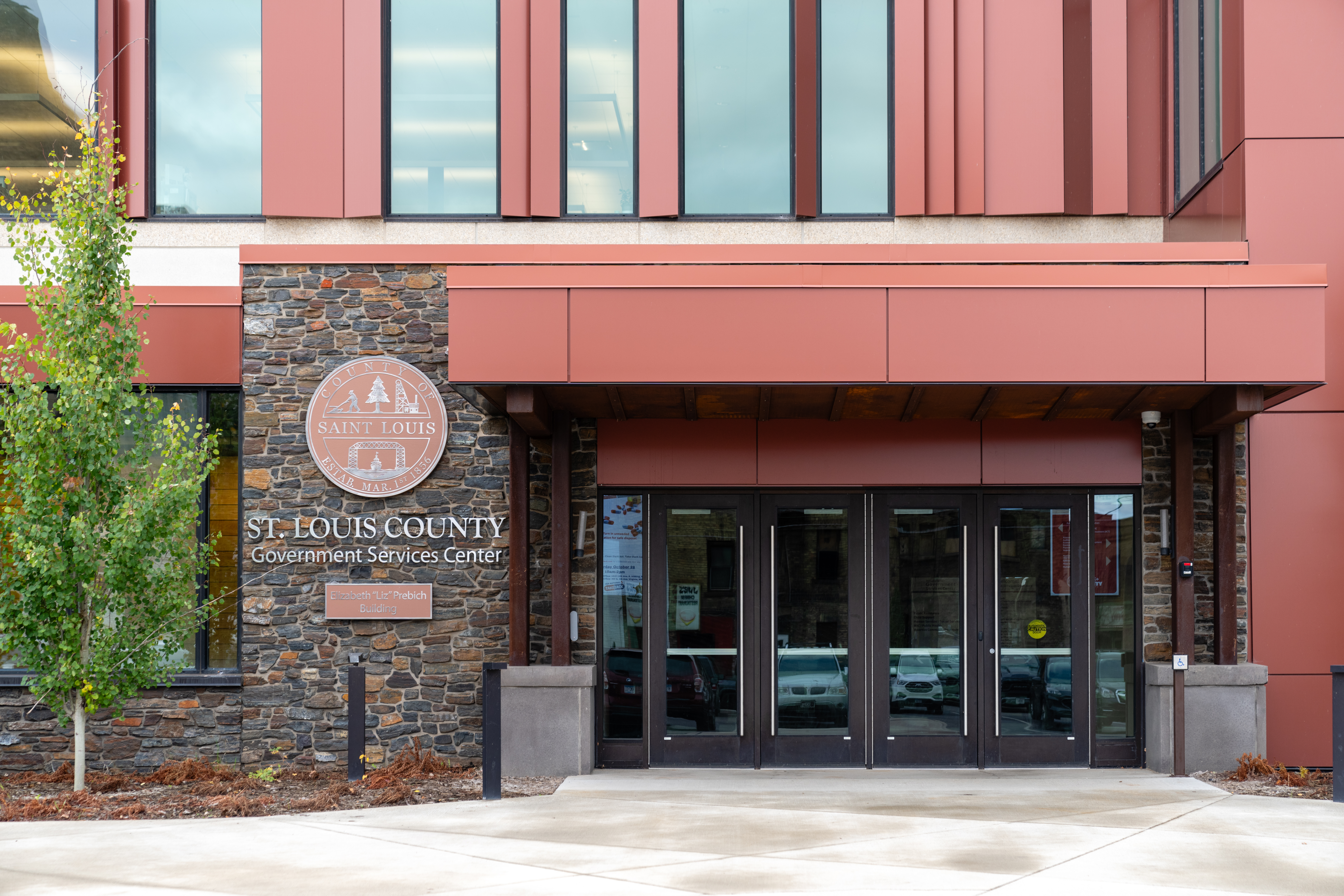
St. Louis County Government Services Center in Virginia

St. Louis County is governed by an elected and nonpartisan board of commissioners. In Minnesota, county commissions usually have five members, but St. Louis, Hennepin, and Ramsey counties have seven-member boards. Each commissioner represents a single-member district of equal population.

The county commission elects a chair who presides at meetings.

Commissioners as of January 2025:

District	Commissioner	In office since	Current term expires
1st	Annie Harala (chair)	2023	January 4, 2027
2nd	Patrick Boyle	2014	January 8, 2029
3rd	Ashley Grimm	2021	January 8, 2029
4th	Paul McDonald	2019	January 4, 2027
5th	Keith Musolf	2019	January 8, 2029
6th	Keith Nelson	2003	January 4, 2027
7th	Mike Jugovich (vice-chair)	2017	January 8, 2029

=== Politics ===
Gubernatorial elections results

Gubernatorial elections results
Year	Republican	Democratic	Third parties
2022	38.1% 35,372	57.67% 53,551	4.22% 3,917
2018	35.41% 35,212	60.72% 60,383	3.88% 3,852
2014	32.5% 26,423	62.09% 50,484	5.41% 4,404
2010	28.58% 24,187	61.81% 52,312	9.62% 8,136

In 2007, St. Louis County considered doing a study about dividing into two counties, but the proposal was not acted on.

This county is one of the most reliably Democratic counties in the state, as no Republican or Independent candidate has won the county in a statewide election since 1992. The only time a Democrat obtained less than 50% of the vote was in 1998, when Jesse Ventura of the Reform ticket won statewide; some 24% of the county voted for him. Since 1992, the only time when a Republican obtained more than 34% of the vote was in the elections of 1994 (the year of the Republican Revolution) when the incumbent Independent-Republican governor won the statewide vote by a landslide of more than 60%, and when the Independent-Republican senatorial candidate won election with 49% statewide, both of which are rare occurrences in Minnesota.

=== Presidential elections ===
United States presidential election results for St. Louis County, Minnesota
Year	Republican		Democratic		Third party(ies)	
Year	No.	%	No.	%	No.	%
1892	5,157	49.67%	3,586	34.54%	1,640	15.80%
1896	9,810	56.36%	7,412	42.58%	184	1.06%
1900	8,851	63.72%	4,667	33.60%	372	2.68%
1904	10,375	77.74%	1,972	14.78%	998	7.48%
1908	12,076	66.08%	4,464	24.43%	1,734	9.49%
1912	3,881	18.59%	5,124	24.54%	11,873	56.87%
1916	10,834	41.47%	12,056	46.15%	3,234	12.38%
1920	27,987	56.98%	14,767	30.07%	6,361	12.95%
1924	37,033	57.31%	2,577	3.99%	25,013	38.71%
1928	44,331	61.13%	25,401	35.03%	2,785	3.84%
1932	34,883	41.66%	40,181	47.99%	8,665	10.35%
1936	22,332	23.88%	69,365	74.18%	1,813	1.94%
1940	32,243	31.42%	68,620	66.87%	1,760	1.72%
1944	27,493	29.90%	63,369	68.92%	1,080	1.17%
1948	28,490	29.28%	62,553	64.29%	6,249	6.42%
1952	38,900	37.66%	63,032	61.03%	1,354	1.31%
1956	39,902	38.84%	62,190	60.54%	631	0.61%
1960	39,620	36.18%	69,270	63.25%	632	0.58%
1964	25,246	24.00%	79,529	75.61%	408	0.39%
1968	25,981	25.52%	72,267	70.99%	3,549	3.49%
1972	41,435	39.77%	61,103	58.65%	1,642	1.58%
1976	35,331	30.97%	75,040	65.78%	3,704	3.25%
1980	33,407	29.13%	69,403	60.52%	11,864	10.35%
1984	34,162	30.27%	77,683	68.83%	1,013	0.90%
1988	31,799	30.80%	70,344	68.14%	1,094	1.06%
1992	24,579	22.59%	61,813	56.81%	22,423	20.61%
1996	25,553	25.50%	60,736	60.62%	13,907	13.88%
2000	35,420	32.96%	64,237	59.78%	7,807	7.26%
2004	40,112	33.55%	77,958	65.20%	1,495	1.25%
2008	38,742	32.61%	77,351	65.10%	2,721	2.29%
2012	39,131	33.85%	73,378	63.48%	3,085	2.67%
2016	44,630	39.70%	57,771	51.39%	10,021	8.91%
2020	49,017	41.01%	67,704	56.64%	2,810	2.35%
2024	50,065	42.07%	66,335	55.74%	2,609	2.19%

St. Louis County has long been one of the strongest Democratic bastions in the state outside of the Twin Cities. The Democrats have carried the county for 24 consecutive presidential elections; the last Republican candidate to carry the county was Herbert Hoover in 1928, before the Great Depression. In recent elections, Republicans have received about 1/3rd of the county's vote. In 2016, Donald Trump earned 39.7% of the county's vote, while the Democratic vote deteriorated to 51.4% (the lowest percentage since 1932); according to exit polls, this was due to residents' concerns about the decline of mining and forestry in the county. This was the closest that a Republican had come to winning the county since 1932. In 2020, Trump became the first Republican since Herbert Hoover to garner more than 40% of the vote in St. Louis County, but Joe Biden bolstered the Democratic margin of victory from 11.7% to 15.6%.

=== Congress ===
St. Louis County is in Minnesota's 8th congressional district. For 36 years, it was represented by Democrat Jim Oberstar. He was defeated in 2010 by Republican Chip Cravaack. Two years later, Cravaack was defeated by Democrat Rick Nolan, who represented the district until his retirement in 2019. Republican St. Louis County commissioner Pete Stauber succeeded Nolan in one of three Democrat-to-Republican district flips in 2018, two of which happened in Minnesota.

United States Senate election results for St Louis County, Minnesota1
Year	Republican		Democratic		Third party(ies)	
Year	No.	%	No.	%	No.	%
2024	41,273	35.19%	72,294	61.64%	3,711	3.16%
2018	30,293	30.35%	66,056	66.18%	3,465	3.47%
2012	25,684	22.96%	82,504	73.76%	3,668	3.28%

United States Senate election results for St. Louis County, Minnesota2
Year	Republican		Democratic		Third party(ies)	
Year	No.	%	No.	%	No.	%
2020	45,016	38.43%	63,036	53.81%	9,083	7.75%
2018	34,478	34.68%	60,187	60.55%	4,741	4.77%
2014	26,114	32.00%	52,347	64.15%	3,137	3.84%

== Communities ==
=== Cities ===
- Aurora
- Babbitt
- Biwabik
- Brookston
- Buhl
- Chisholm
- Cook
- Duluth (county seat)
- Ely
- Eveleth
- Floodwood
- Gilbert
- Hermantown
- Hibbing
- Hoyt Lakes
- Iron Junction
- Kinney
- Leonidas
- McKinley
- Meadowlands
- Mountain Iron
- Orr
- Proctor
- Rice Lake
- Tower
- Virginia
- Winton

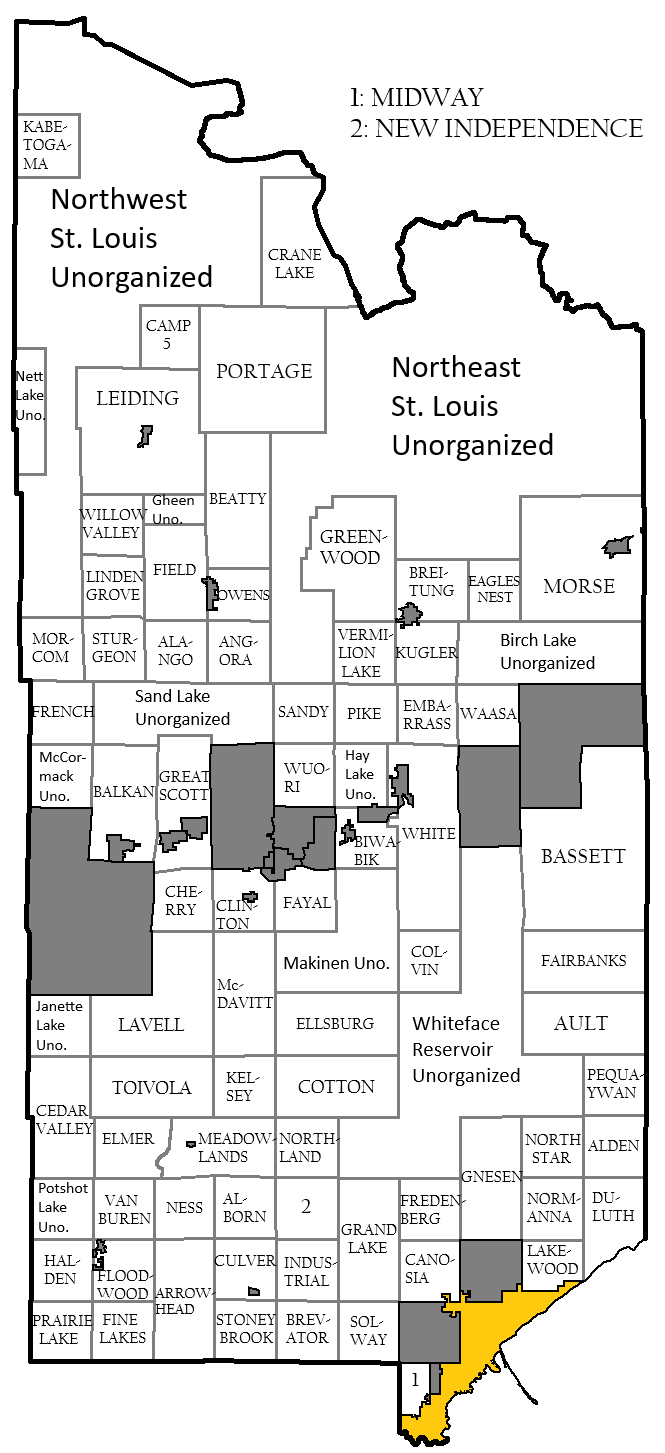
Townships and Unorganized Territories of St. Louis County

=== Townships ===
- Alango Township
- Alborn Township
- Alden Township
- Angora Township
- Arrowhead Township
- Ault Township
- Balkan Township
- Bassett Township
- Beatty Township
- Biwabik Township
- Breitung Township
- Brevator Township
- Camp 5 Township
- Canosia Township
- Cedar Valley Township
- Cherry Township
- Clinton Township
- Colvin Township
- Cotton Township
- Crane Lake Township
- Culver Township
- Duluth Township
- Eagles Nest Township
- Ellsburg Township
- Elmer Township
- Embarrass Township
- Fairbanks Township
- Fayal Township
- Field Township
- Fine Lakes Township
- Floodwood Township
- Fredenberg Township
- French Township
- Gnesen Township
- Grand Lake Township
- Great Scott Township
- Greenwood Township
- Halden Township
- Industrial Township
- Kabetogama Township
- Kelsey Township
- Kugler Township
- Lakewood Township
- Lavell Township
- Leiding Township
- Linden Grove Township
- McDavitt Township
- Meadowlands Township
- Midway Township
- Morcom Township
- Morse Township
- Ness Township
- New Independence Township
- Normanna Township
- North Star Township
- Northland Township
- Owens Township
- Pequaywan Township
- Pike Township
- Portage Township
- Prairie Lake Township
- Sandy Township
- Solway Township
- Stoney Brook Township
- Sturgeon Township
- Toivola Township
- Van Buren Township
- Vermilion Lake Township
- Waasa Township
- White Township
- Willow Valley Township
- Wuori Township

=== Unorganized territories ===
- Bear Head Lake (former)
- Birch Lake
- Camp A Lake (former)
- Crab Lake (former)
- Dark River
- Gheen
- Hay Lake
- Heikkala Lake
- Hush Lake
- Janette Lake
- Leander Lake
- Linwood Lake
- Marion Lake
- McCormack
- Mud Hen Lake
- Nett Lake
- Northeast St. Louis
- Northwest St. Louis
- Pfeiffer Lake
- Picket Lake
- Potshot Lake
- Sand Lake
- Slim Lake
- Sturgeon River
- Sunday Lake
- Tikander Lake
- Whiteface Reservoir

=== Census-designated places ===
- Mahnomen
- Nett Lake
- Soudan

=== Unincorporated communities ===
- Alborn
- Angora
- Ash Lake
- Bassett
- Bear River
- Bengal
- Brimson
- Britt
- Burnett
- Burntside
- Buyck
- Canyon
- Celina
- Central Lakes
- Cherry
- Clover Valley
- Cotton
- Crane Lake
- Culver
- Cusson
- Eldes Corner
- Elmer
- Embarrass
- Fairbanks
- Florenton
- Forbes
- Four Corners
- French River
- Gheen
- Gheen Corner
- Glendale
- Gowan
- Greaney
- Idington
- Independence
- Island Lake
- Kabetogama
- Keenan
- Kelsey
- Linden Grove
- Makinen
- Markham
- McComber
- Meadow Brook
- Melrude
- Munger
- Palmers
- Palo
- Payne
- Peary
- Petrel
- Peyla
- Pineville
- Prosit
- Ramshaw
- Robinson
- Rollins
- Saginaw
- Sax
- Shaw
- Sherman Corner
- Side Lake
- Silica
- Simar
- Skibo
- Sturgeon
- Taft
- Toivola
- Twig
- Vermilion Dam
- Wakemup
- Whiteface
- Wolf
- Zim

=== Ghost towns ===
- Carson Lake
- Costin Village
- Elcor
- Fermoy
- Spina

== Education ==
K-12 school districts include:

- Chisholm Public School District
- Cloquet Public School District
- Duluth Public Schools
- Ely Public School District
- Eveleth-Gilbert School District
- Floodwood Public School District
- Hermantown Public School District
- Hibbing Public School District
- Lake Superior Public School District
- Mesabi East School District
- Mountain Iron-Buhl School District
- Proctor Public School District
- Rock Ridge Public Schools
- Virginia Public School District

There is one elementary school district, Nett Lake Public School District.

== See also ==
- National Register of Historic Places listings in St. Louis County, Minnesota
- Independent School District 2142
