= Mud Hen Lake, Minnesota =

Unorganized territory of St. Louis County, Minnesota, United States

Coordinates: 47°21′34″N 92°18′46″W

Mud Hen Lake is an unorganized territory in Saint Louis County, Minnesota, United States. The population was 320 at the 2000 census.

The unincorporated community of Makinen is located within Mud Hen Lake Unorganized Territory. Mail service is provided at Makinen.

== Geography ==
According to the United States Census Bureau, the unorganized territory has a total area of 35.8 square miles (92.7 km^{2}); 34.5 square miles (89.5 km^{2}) is land and 1.2 square miles (3.2 km^{2}) (3.49%) is water.

== Demographics ==
At the 2000 United States census, there were 320 people, 131 households, and 91 families living in the unorganized territory. The population density was 9.3 inhabitants per square mile (3.6/km^{2}). There were 246 housing units at an average density of 7.1 per square mile (2.7/km^{2}). The racial makeup of the unorganized territory was 98.12% White, 0.31% Native American, 0.31% Asian, and 1.25% from two or more races. Hispanic or Latino of any race were 0.62%.

Of the 131 households, 31.3% had children under the age of 18 living with them, 57.3% were married couples living together, 7.6% had a female householder with no husband present, and 30.5% were non-families. 22.9% of households were one person and 4.6% were one person aged 65 or older. The average household size was 2.44 and the average family size was 2.86.

The age distribution was 24.7% under the age of 18, 5.6% from 18 to 24, 28.1% from 25 to 44, 31.9% from 45 to 64, and 9.7% 65 or older. The median age was 41 years. For every 100 females, there were 97.5 males. For every 100 females age 18 and over, there were 107.8 males.

The median income for a household in the unorganized territory was $42,656, and the median family income was $29,886. Males had a median income of $36,154 versus $13,958 for females. The per capita income for the unorganized territory was $16,987. About 20.5% of families and 16.9% of the population were below the poverty line, including 12.3% of those under age 18 and 21.2% of those age 65 or over.
