= Kinney, Minnesota =

City in Minnesota, United States

Kinney
- City
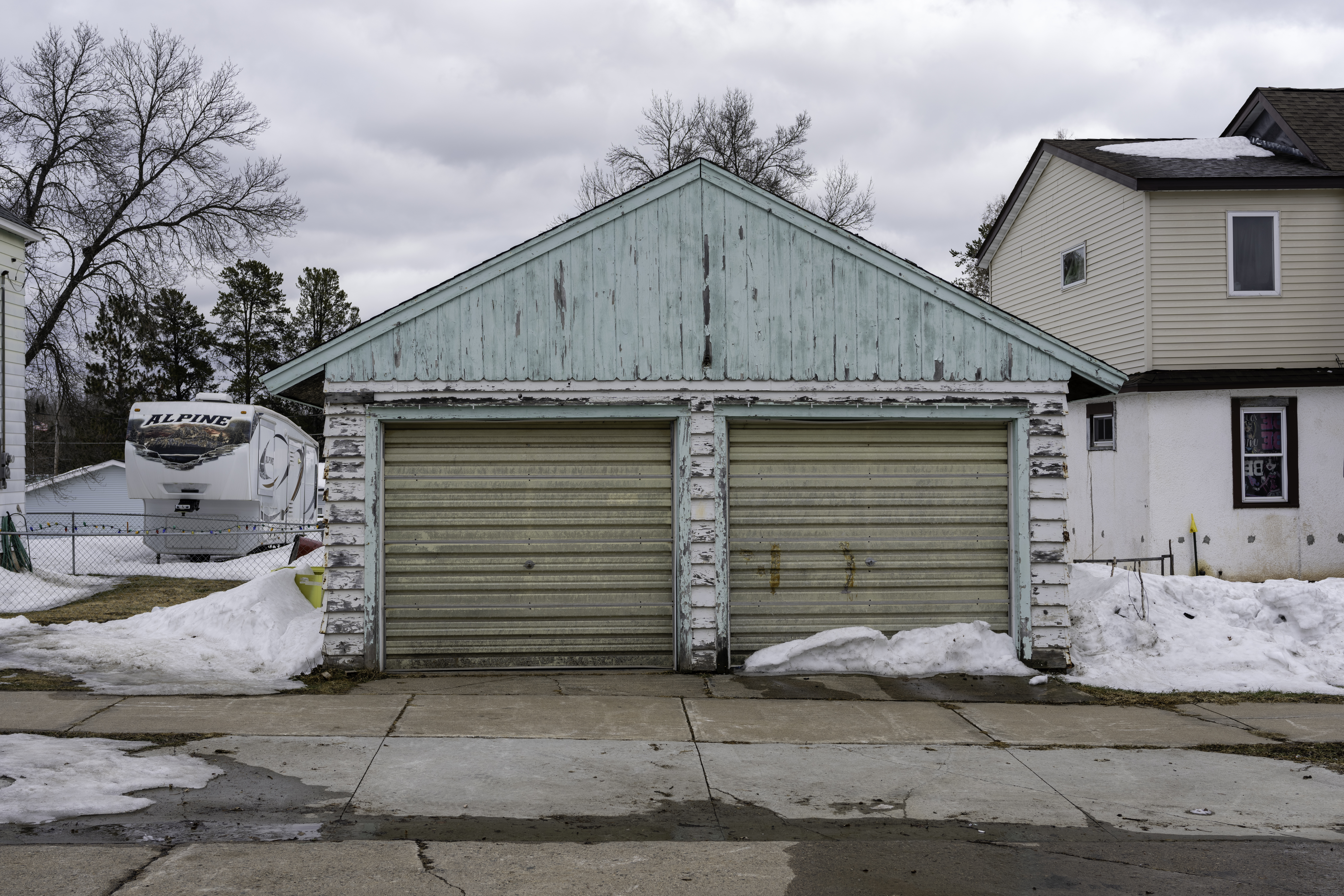
- Aqua garage in Kinney, Minnesota

- Location of the city of Kinney within Saint Louis County, Minnesota
- Coordinates: 47°30′51″N 92°43′51″W
- Country: United States
- State: Minnesota
- County: Saint Louis

Area
  - Total: 4.12 sq mi (10.68 km^{2})
  - Land: 3.91 sq mi (10.13 km^{2})
  - Water: 0.21 sq mi (0.55 km^{2})
- Elevation: 1,545 ft (471 m)

Population (2020)
  - Total: 152
  - Density: 38.9/sq mi (15.01/km^{2})
- Time zone: UTC-6 (Central (CST))
  - Summer (DST): UTC-5 (CDT)
- ZIP codes: 55758
- Area code: 218
- FIPS code: 27-33416
- GNIS feature ID: 661645

Kinney is a city in Saint Louis County, Minnesota, United States. The population was 152 at the time of the 2020 census. It is best known for having "seceded" from the United States in 1977 and establishing the "Republic of Kinney". Originally a publicity stunt to draw attention to underfunding of municipal projects in the area, the "Republic of Kinney" remained a part of the civic identity of Kinney for decades afterwards.

== History ==
Kinney gets its name from Hon. O. D. Kinney (Orrin Day Kinney; 1845–1911), who was one of the original European owners of the Merritt site in 1892 along with Judge J.T. Hale, and Capt. Joseph Sellwood. The land was originally occupied by Algonquian-speaking tribes, including the Ojibwe, Odawa, and Potawatomi.

=== Republic of Kinney ===
Mary P. Anderson (1915–2007) was elected the first female mayor of Kinney (and on the Iron Range) from 1973 to 2002. By 1977, the City of Kinney, with a population of 325 according to the 1970 census, suffered from a failing water system, and was faced with a replacement cost of $186,000. After numerous unsuccessful attempts to secure funding from state and federal agencies due to bureaucratic red tape, agencies such as the United States Department of Housing and Urban Development (HUD), the Federal Housing Administration (FHA), and the Iron Range Resources and Rehabilitation Commission (IRRRC), the city council was led to believe that it would be easier to receive foreign aid if Kinney seceded from the union, declared war, and lost immediately. Mayor Mary Anderson and a supportive Kinney City Council sent a secession letter to U.S. Secretary of State Cyrus Vance on July 13, 1977.

The secession was never officially acknowledged by Vance or the U.S. The news story broke locally in the Mesabi Daily News on February 5, 1978, in an article by Ginny Wennen entitled "Move over Monaco, here comes Kinney." The story garnered national and international attention beginning on February 7, 1978, when the story was featured on the NBC Nightly News with David Brinkley.

Jeno Paulucci, a businessman based in Duluth, Minnesota, was the first to acknowledge the new republic and offer 'foreign aid' in the form of a dark brown 1974 Ford LTD police squad car and 10 cases of Jenos Sausage Pizza Mix on February 13, 1978. The squad car was painted with a Republic of Kinney shield on the driver's side that read "Commander in Chief, Republic of Kinney," and "Chief of Police, Kinney, Mn." on the passenger side.

In November 1978, the Iron Range Resources and Rehabilitation Board (IRRRB) approved $198,000 grant, allocated in three payments of $66,000 per year from the Taconite Area Environmental Protection Fund, to repair the existing water system, construct cement runoff basins, and install additional fire hydrants.

The Republic of Kinney went on to create and sell over 1,600 passports between March and April 1978 at $1.00 apiece. Later the republic created buttons and sold T-shirts, and had a summer festival called 'Secession Days', which was first held during the weekend of August 1–2, 1987.

The city celebrated the 30th anniversary of its "independence" as the Republic of Kinney during the weekend of July 13–15, 2007. In conjunction with the 30th anniversary of the Kinney secession, the city published a book titled Republic of Kinney.

== Geography ==
According to the United States Census Bureau, the city has a total area of 4.83 square miles (12.51 km^{2}); 4.62 square miles (11.97 km^{2}) is land and 0.21 square miles (0.54 km^{2}) is water. U.S. Highway 169 serves as a main route in the area.

== Demographics ==
Historical population
Census	Pop.	Note	%±
1920	1,200		—
1930	737		−38.6%
1940	462		−37.3%
1950	336		−27.3%
1960	240		−28.6%
1970	325		35.4%
1980	447		37.5%
1990	257		−42.5%
2000	199		−22.6%
2010	169		−15.1%
2020	152		−10.1%
U.S. Decennial Census

=== 2010 census ===
As of the census of 2010, there were 169 people, 70 households, and 43 families living in the city. The population density was 36.6 inhabitants per square mile (14.1/km^{2}). There were 83 housing units at an average density of 18.0 per square mile (6.9/km^{2}). The racial makeup of the city was 97.6% White, 1.2% Native American, and 1.2% from two or more races.

There were 70 households, of which 32.9% had children under the age of 18 living with them, 45.7% were married couples living together, 8.6% had a female householder with no husband present, 7.1% had a male householder with no wife present, and 38.6% were non-families. 27.1% of all households were made up of individuals, and 7.2% had someone living alone who was 65 years of age or older. The average household size was 2.41 and the average family size was 2.88.

The median age in the city was 40.1 years. 22.5% of residents were under the age of 18; 8.8% were between the ages of 18 and 24; 24.2% were from 25 to 44; 33.1% were from 45 to 64; and 11.2% were 65 years of age or older. The gender makeup of the city was 52.1% male and 47.9% female.

=== 2000 census ===
As of the census of 2000, there were 199 people, 82 households, and 61 families living in the city. The population density was 43.6 inhabitants per square mile (16.8/km^{2}). There were 88 housing units at an average density of 19.3 per square mile (7.5/km^{2}). The racial makeup of the city was 94.47% White, 2.01% Native American, and 3.52% from two or more races. Hispanic or Latino of any race were 3.02% of the population. 25.3% were of Finnish, 19.2% German, 8.9% Irish, 8.2% Norwegian, 6.8% Swedish, 6.2% French Canadian and 6.2% Italian ancestry.

There were 82 households, out of which 31.7% had children under the age of 18 living with them, 61.0% were married couples living together, 8.5% had a female householder with no husband present, and 24.4% were non-families. 22.0% of all households were made up of individuals, and 9.8% had someone living alone who was 65 years of age or older. The average household size was 2.40 and the average family size was 2.73.

In the city, the population was spread out, with 25.6% under the age of 18, 3.5% from 18 to 24, 28.1% from 25 to 44, 22.6% from 45 to 64, and 20.1% who were 65 years of age or older. The median age was 42 years. For every 100 females, there were 111.7 males. For every 100 females age 18 and over, there were 100.0 males.

The median income for a household in the city was $25,000, and the median income for a family was $33,125. Males had a median income of $31,667 versus $17,361 for females. The per capita income for the city was $14,756. About 9.4% of families and 13.6% of the population were below the poverty line, including 29.4% of those under the age of eighteen and none of those 65 or over.
