= Heikkala Lake, Minnesota =

Unorganized territory in St. Louis County, Minnesota, United States

Coordinates: 47°21′28″N 92°24′44″W

Heikkala Lake is an unorganized territory in Saint Louis County, Minnesota, United States. The population was 322 at the 2000 census.

The unincorporated community of Central Lakes is located within Heikkala Lake Unorganized Territory.

== Geography ==
According to the United States Census Bureau, the unorganized territory has a total area of 35.2 square miles (91.1 km^{2}), of which 32.8 square miles (85.1 km^{2}) is land and 2.3 square miles (6.0 km^{2}) (6.62%) is water.

== Demographics ==
At the 2000 United States census there were 322 people, 130 households, and 92 families living in the unorganized territory. The population density was 9.8 inhabitants per square mile (3.8/km^{2}). There were 225 housing units at an average density of 6.8 per square mile (2.6/km^{2}). The racial makeup of the unorganized territory was 99.38% White and 0.62% Native American. Hispanic or Latino of any race were 0.31%.

Of the 130 households 27.7% had children under the age of 18 living with them, 64.6% were married couples living together, 3.8% had a female householder with no husband present, and 28.5% were non-families. 26.9% of households were one person and 6.2% were one person aged 65 or older. The average household size was 2.48 and the average family size was 2.97.

The age distribution was 26.1% under the age of 18, 4.0% from 18 to 24, 25.8% from 25 to 44, 34.5% from 45 to 64, and 9.6% 65 or older. The median age was 42 years. For every 100 females, there were 103.8 males. For every 100 females age 18 and over, there were 114.4 males.

The median household income was $39,773 and the median family income was $46,875. Males had a median income of $40,625 versus $26,786 for females. The per capita income for the unorganized territory was $20,765. About 12.2% of families and 8.2% of the population were below the poverty line, including 10.1% of those under age 18 and 3.4% of those age 65 or over.
