= McDavitt Township, St. Louis County, Minnesota =

McDavitt Township, Minnesota
- Township
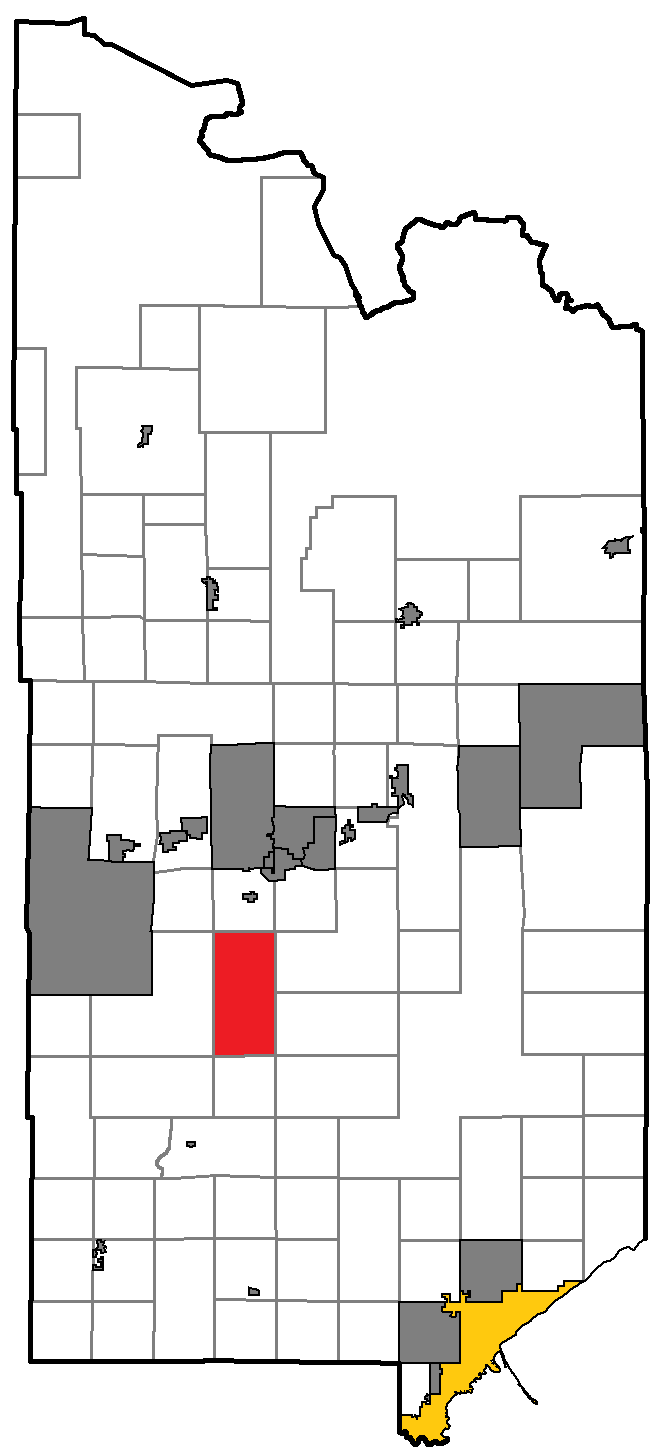
- Location of McDavitt Township within St. Louis County, Minnesota
- Coordinates: 47°17′36″N 92°38′7″W
- Country: United States
- State: Minnesota
- County: Saint Louis

Area
  - Total: 72.4 sq mi (187.4 km^{2})
  - Land: 71.2 sq mi (184.3 km^{2})
  - Water: 1.2 sq mi (3.2 km^{2})
- Elevation: 1,329 ft (405 m)

Population (2020)
  - Total: 434
  - Density: 6.10/sq mi (2.35/km^{2})
- Time zone: UTC-6 (Central (CST))
  - Summer (DST): UTC-5 (CDT)
- FIPS code: 27-38960
- GNIS feature ID: 0664856
- Website: https://mcdavitttownship.org/

McDavitt Township is a township in Saint Louis County, Minnesota, United States. The population was 434 at the 2020 census.

Saint Louis County Highway 7 serves as a main route in the township.

The unincorporated communities of Sax and Zim are both located within McDavitt Township.

The unincorporated community of Forbes also extends into the northern portion of the township.

== History ==
McDavitt Township was named for J. A. McDavitt, an early figure in the local lumber industry.

== Geography ==
According to the United States Census Bureau, the township has a total area of 72.4 square miles (188 km^{2}); 71.2 square miles (184 km^{2}) is land and 1.2 square miles (3.1 km^{2}), or 1.70%, is water.

The Saint Louis River flows through the northern portion of McDavitt Township.

=== Adjacent townships and communities ===
The following are adjacent to McDavitt Township :

- Lavell Township (west)
- Ellsburg Township (east)
- Clinton Township (north)
- Cherry Township (northwest)
- Fayal Township (northeast)
- Kelsey Township (south)
- Toivola Township (southwest)
- Cotton Township (southeast)
- Heikkala Lake Unorganized Territory (east)
- The unincorporated community of Central Lakes (east)
- The unincorporated community of Makinen (east)
- The city of Eveleth (northeast)

=== Unincorporated communities ===
- Forbes
- Sax
- Zim

== Demographics ==
As of the census of 2000, there were 487 people, 188 households, and 149 families living in the township. The population density was 6.8 inhabitants per square mile (2.6/km^{2}). There were 229 housing units at an average density of 3.2 per square mile (1.2/km^{2}). The racial makeup of the township was 96.10% White, 0.41% African American, 1.64% Native American, 0.21% Asian, 0.21% Pacific Islander, 0.62% from other races, and 0.82% from two or more races. Hispanic or Latino of any race were 1.03% of the population.

There were 188 households, out of which 35.1% had children under the age of 18 living with them, 70.2% were married couples living together, 5.3% had a female householder with no husband present, and 20.7% were non-families. 19.7% of all households were made up of individuals, and 6.9% had someone living alone who was 65 years of age or older. The average household size was 2.59 and the average family size was 2.93.

In the township the population was spread out, with 25.9% under the age of 18, 6.6% from 18 to 24, 26.9% from 25 to 44, 30.0% from 45 to 64, and 10.7% who were 65 years of age or older. The median age was 40 years. For every 100 females, there were 111.7 males. For every 100 females age 18 and over, there were 111.1 males.

The median income for a household in the township was $40,625, and the median income for a family was $43,500. Males had a median income of $37,000 versus $23,750 for females. The per capita income for the township was $16,251. About 9.5% of families and 14.4% of the population were below the poverty line, including 22.1% of those under age 18 and 19.6% of those age 65 or over.
