= Minnesota State Highway 37 =

State highway in Minnesota, United States

Trunk Highway 37
- MN 37 highlighted in red

Route information
- Maintained by MnDOT
- Length: 28.325 mi (45.585 km)
- Existed: 1933–present

Major junctions
- West end: US 169 / MN 73 at Hibbing
- US 53 at Eveleth
- East end: MN 135 at Gilbert

Location
- Country: United States
- State: Minnesota
- Counties: St. Louis

Highway system
- Minnesota Trunk Highway System; Interstate; US; State; Legislative; Scenic
← MN 36	→ MN 38

Minnesota State Highway 37 (MN 37) is a 28.325-mile-long (45.585 km) highway in northeast Minnesota, which runs from its intersection with U.S. 169 / State Highway 73 in Hibbing and continues east to its eastern terminus at its intersection with State Highway 135 in Gilbert.

Highway 37 serves as a direct route between Hibbing and U.S. Highway 53.

== Route description ==
State Highway 37 serves as an east–west route between Hibbing, Eveleth, and Gilbert in northeast Minnesota.

The Wellstone Memorial and Historic site is located three miles east of the junction of U.S. 53 / Highway 37 / Bodas Road at Fayal Township near Eveleth. The site honors Senator Paul Wellstone and seven others who died in an October 25, 2002 plane crash.

== History ==
State Highway 37, between U.S. 53 at Eveleth and State Highway 135 at Gilbert, was authorized in 1933.

The route was paved by 1940.

The section of Highway 37 between U.S. 53 at Fayal Township near Eveleth and U.S. 169 at Hibbing was authorized in 1949. This portion of Highway 37 was originally numbered State Highway 216 from 1949 to 1963.

== Major intersections ==
The entire route is in St. Louis County.

Location	mi	km	Destinations	Notes
Hibbing	0.000	0.000	US 169 south / MN 73 south – Grand Rapids	West end of US 169 overlap
Hibbing	0.846	1.362	US 169 north / MN 73 north – Chisholm, Virginia	East end of US 169 overlap
Hibbing	6.398	10.297	CR 5 south	
Cherry Township	7.091	11.412	CR 5 north	
Cherry Township	10.349	16.655	CR 25	
Cherry Township	11.349	18.264	CR 25	
Cherry Township	12.360	19.891	CR 137	
Clinton Township	14.354	23.101	CR 62	
Clinton Township	16.338	26.293	CR 7	
Fayal Township	20.296	32.663	US 53 south – Duluth	South end of US 53 overlap
Eveleth	24.741	39.817	US 53 north – Virginia	North end of US 53 overlap
Gilbert	26.546	42.722	CR 97 / FFH 11	West end of Forest Highway 11
Gilbert	28.274	45.503	CR 105	
Gilbert	28.413	45.726	MN 135 / FFH 11 (Superior National Forest Scenic Byway) – Virginia, Biwabik, Aurora	East end of Forest Highway 11 overlap
1.000 mi = 1.609 km; 1.000 km = 0.621 mi: Concurrency terminus
