= Forbes, Minnesota =

Forbes
- Unincorporated community
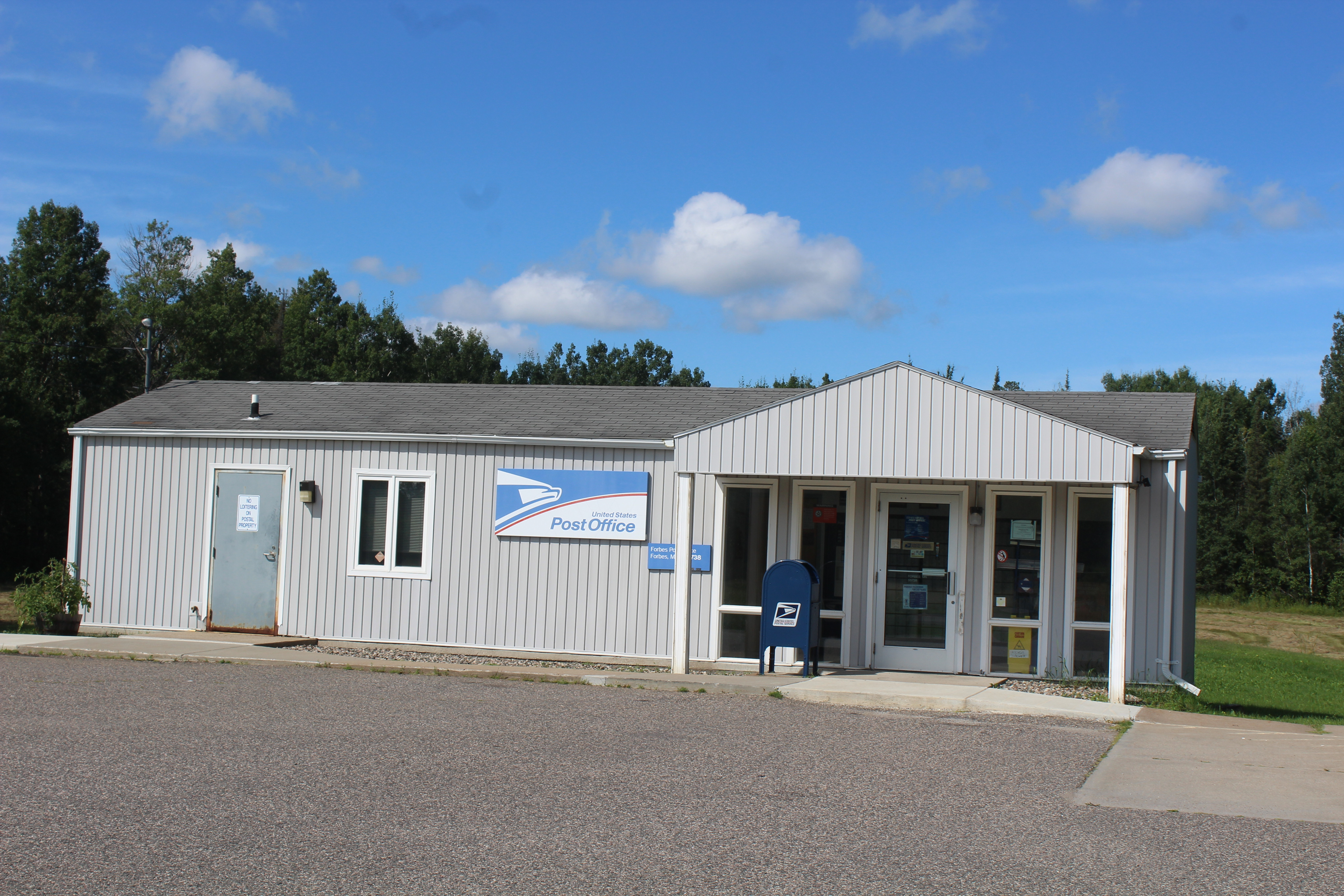
- Post office

- Location within Minnesota Location within the United States
- Coordinates: 47°22′18″N 92°36′15″W
- Country: United States
- State: Minnesota
- County: Saint Louis
- Elevation: 1,348 ft (411 m)

Population
  - Total: 30
- Time zone: UTC-6 (Central (CST))
  - Summer (DST): UTC-5 (CDT)
- ZIP code: 55738
- Area code: 218
- GNIS feature ID: 661298

Forbes is an unincorporated community in Saint Louis County, Minnesota, United States.

The community is located 10 miles southwest of the city of Eveleth at the junction of Saint Louis County Highway 7 and County Highway 16.

Forbes is located along the boundary line between Clinton Township and McDavitt Township.

State Highway 37 (MN 37) and U.S. Highway 53 are both nearby. The Saint Louis River is in the vicinity.
