= Central Lakes, Minnesota =

Central Lakes
- Unincorporated community
- Location within Minnesota Location within the United States
- Coordinates: 47°17′33″N 92°28′35″W
- Country: United States
- State: Minnesota
- County: Saint Louis
- Elevation: 1,362 ft (415 m)
- Time zone: UTC-6 (Central (CST))
  - Summer (DST): UTC-5 (CDT)
- ZIP code: 55734
- Area code: 218
- GNIS feature ID: 660978

Central Lakes is an unincorporated community in Saint Louis County, Minnesota, United States.

The community is located 17 miles (27 km) south of the city of Virginia at the junction of U.S. Highway 53 and Saint Louis County Road 93. Central Lakes is located 45 miles (72 km) north of the city of Duluth.

Central Lakes is located between Cotton and Eveleth on Highway 53.

Anchor Lake, Augusta Lake, Central Lake, Elliott Lake, and Murphy Lake are in the vicinity.

The Anchor Lake Rest Area on Highway 53 is nearby.
