= Iron Junction, Minnesota =

City in Minnesota, United States

- City
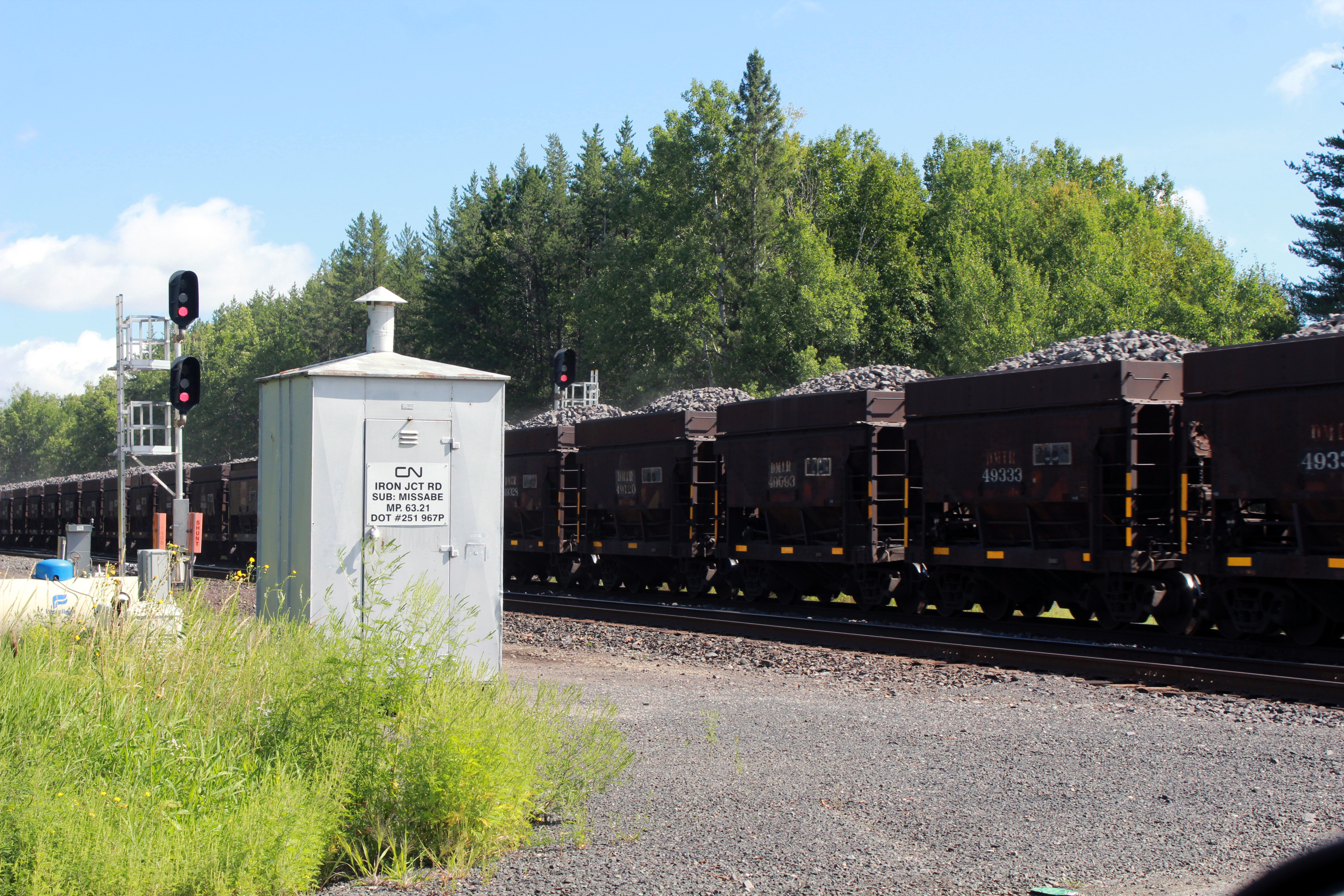
- Ore cars carrying iron ore through Iron Junction

- Location of the city of Iron Junction within Saint Louis County, Minnesota
- Coordinates: 47°25′1″N 92°36′16″W
- Country: United States
- State: Minnesota
- County: Saint Louis
- Incorporated: 1893

Government
  - Mayor: Travis McDonald

Area
  - Total: 0.812 sq mi (2.102 km^{2})
  - Land: 0.812 sq mi (2.102 km^{2})
  - Water: 0 sq mi (0.000 km^{2})
- Elevation: 1,385 ft (422 m)

Population (2020)
  - Total: 110
  - Estimate (2022): 107
  - Density: 135.5/sq mi (52.33/km^{2})
- Time zone: UTC−6 (Central (CST))
  - Summer (DST): UTC−5 (CDT)
- ZIP Code: 55751
- Area code: 218
- FIPS code: 27-31238
- GNIS feature ID: 0661552
- Sales tax: 7.375%

Iron Junction is a city in Saint Louis County, Minnesota, United States. The population was 110 at the 2020 census.

Saint Louis County Highway 7 and Iron Junction Road serve as main routes in the community. State Highway 37 (MN 37) is nearby.

The name Iron Junction, as a place of residence, is seldom used today by its residents. Those who reside in this community simply identify themselves as a resident of Iron. The road signs posted in the community also simply read "Iron".

The city of Iron Junction is located within Clinton Township geographically but is a separate entity.

== Geography ==
According to the United States Census Bureau, the city has a total area of 0.812 square miles (2.10 km^{2}), all land.

== Demographics ==
Historical population
Census	Pop.	Note	%±
1900	118		—
1910	76		−35.6%
1920	92		21.1%
1930	128		39.1%
1940	107		−16.4%
1950	128		19.6%
1960	187		46.1%
1970	150		−19.8%
1980	134		−10.7%
1990	133		−0.7%
2000	93		−30.1%
2010	86		−7.5%
2020	110		27.9%
2022 (est.)	107		−2.7%
U.S. Decennial Census; 2020 Census

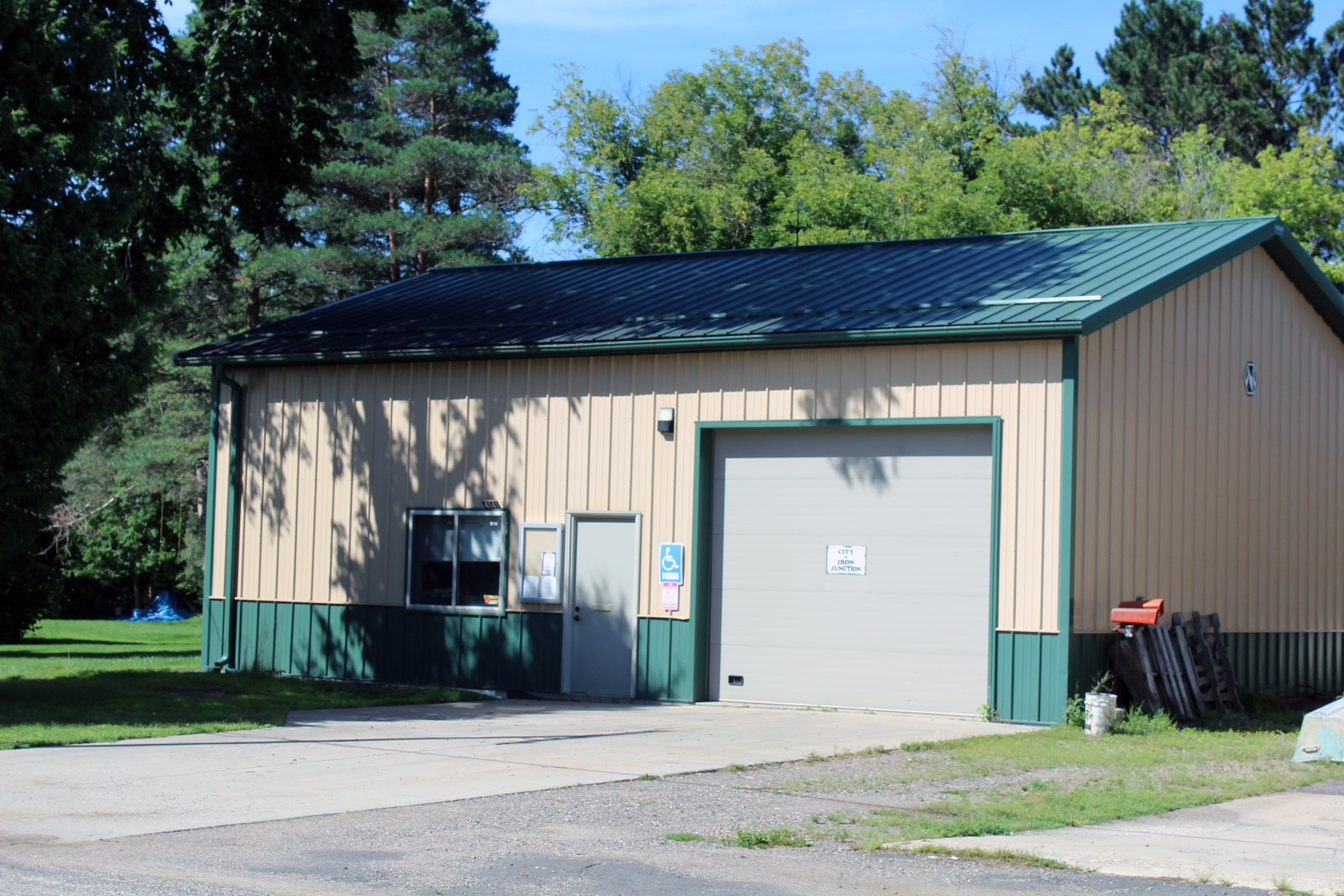
City Office

=== 2010 census ===
As of the 2010 census, there were 86 people, 45 households, and 24 families living in the city. The population density was 103.6 inhabitants per square mile (40.0/km^{2}). There were 47 housing units at an average density of 56.6 per square mile (21.9/km^{2}). The racial makeup of the city was 96.5% White, 1.2% from other races, and 2.3% from two or more races. Hispanic or Latino of any race were 2.3% of the population.

There were 45 households, of which 15.6% had children under the age of 18 living with them, 42.2% were married couples living together, 2.2% had a female householder with no husband present, 8.9% had a male householder with no wife present, and 46.7% were non-families. 37.8% of all households were made up of individuals, and 11.1% had someone living alone who was 65 years of age or older. The average household size was 1.91 and the average family size was 2.42.

The median age in the city was 53.5 years. 12.8% of residents were under the age of 18; 4.6% were between the ages of 18 and 24; 16.3% were from 25 to 44; 45.4% were from 45 to 64; and 20.9% were 65 years of age or older. The gender makeup of the city was 54.7% male and 45.3% female.

=== 2000 census ===
As of the 2000 census, there were 93 people, 44 households, and 31 families living in the city. The population density was 119.3 inhabitants per square mile (46.1/km^{2}). There were 44 housing units at an average density of 56.4 per square mile (21.8/km^{2}). The racial makeup of the city was 100.00% White. 26.5% were of Norwegian, 14.7% Finnish, 13.2% German, 11.8% Swedish, 8.8% Slovene and 5.9% French Canadian ancestry.

There were 44 households, out of which 20.5% had children under the age of 18 living with them, 61.4% were married couples living together, 2.3% had a female householder with no husband present, and 29.5% were non-families. 25.0% of all households were made up of individuals, and 9.1% had someone living alone who was 65 years of age or older. The average household size was 2.11 and the average family size was 2.52.

In the city, the population was spread out, with 14.0% under the age of 18, 5.4% from 18 to 24, 26.9% from 25 to 44, 30.1% from 45 to 64, and 23.7% who were 65 years of age or older. The median age was 47 years. For every 100 females, there were 126.8 males. For every 100 females age 18 and over, there were 122.2 males.

The median income for a household in the city was $40,938, and the median income for a family was $45,625. Males had a median income of $39,375 versus $31,875 for females. The per capita income for the city was $21,751. None of the population and none of the families were below the poverty line.
