= Clover Valley, Minnesota =

Clover Valley Northshore Valley
- Clover Valley
- Location within Minnesota Location within the United States
- Coordinates: 46°59′46″N 91°50′49″W
- Country: United States
- State: Minnesota
- County: Lake County, St. Louis County
- Townships: Alden Township, Duluth Township
- Time zone: UTC-6 (Central (CST))
  - Summer (DST): UTC-5 (Central (CDT))
- ZIP code: 55804 55616
- Area code: 218
- Website: clovervalleyfarmtrail.com instagram.com/explore/locations/749679067/clover-valley-minnesota/

Clover Valley is an informally defined rural area on Minnesota’s North Shore, located primarily within Lake County and St. Louis County. The term is used locally to describe a geographically contiguous inland area spanning portions of Duluth Township and southeastern Alden Township, as well as inland areas of the unincorporated communities of Knife River and Larsmont. The area lies largely within the Lake Superior School District, with many children historically attending North Shore Community School, a K–6 public charter school. It is more of a large rural neighborhood, encompassing multiple Incorporated Towns (aka) Townships and Unincorporated Territories.

"The Valley" is generally associated with the drainage basins of the Knife River and its tributaries, the lower half of the Big Sucker River watershed, and the lower third of the French River watershed. Topographically, the area is situated between two segments of the eroded Cabotian Mountains that runs along the North Shore of Lake Superior. To the northeast, the area is commonly described as ending near the divide between the Knife River and Stewart River drainage basins.

Although Clover Valley has no officially recognized boundaries, it is often described in relation to nearby roads, homesteads, and landmarks. The southern extent is commonly associated with the Voyageur Highway (Minnesota State Expressway 61), with approximate reference points near McQuade Road to the southwest and Stanley Road and Shoreview Road to the southeast. Northern reference points are frequently associated with sections of the Superior Hiking Trail and nearby campsites and trailheads, including areas near Fox Farm Road, Rossini Road, McCarthy Creek, Ferguson Creek, and Sucker Creek. Portions of the area include land surrounding Richard B. Helgeson Airport (KTWM), known simply as, the Two Harbors Municipal Airport.

The approximate geographic center of the area is often cited near the intersection of Homestead Road and Hegberg Road, with the broader area extending about 8 miles Northeast and Southwest.

Nearby bordering communities, townships, and cities include: Lakewood & Normanna Townships; the city of Duluth’s Lakewood & North Shore neighborhoods; the coastal French River, Palmers, Knife River, and Larsmont communities; the city of Two Harbors; the inland rural communities of Waldo & Stewart, as well as, the further inland Pequaywan & North Star Townships.
