= Duluth Township, St. Louis County, Minnesota =

Duluth Township, Minnesota
- Township
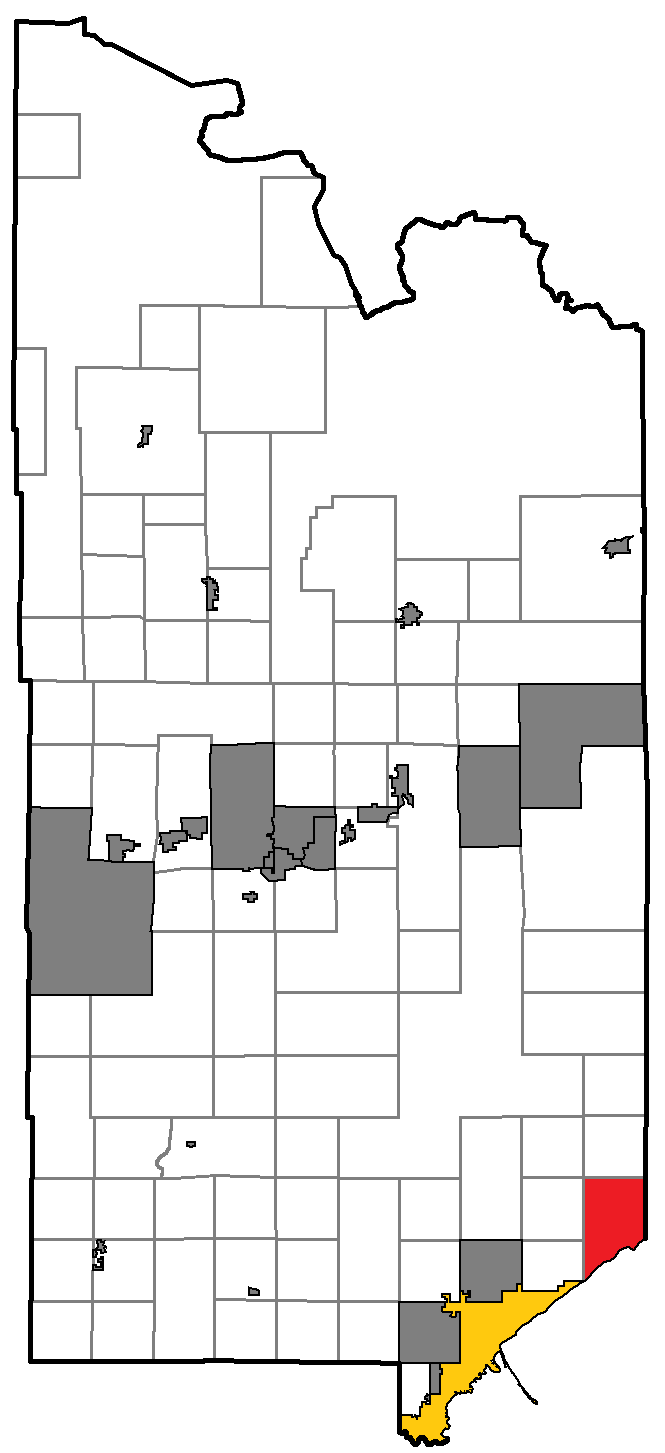
- Location of Duluth Township within St. Louis County, Minnesota
- Coordinates: 46°56′26″N 91°51′37″W
- Country: United States
- State: Minnesota
- County: Saint Louis

Area
  - Total: 51.9 sq mi (134.3 km^{2})
  - Land: 46.5 sq mi (120.4 km^{2})
  - Water: 5.4 sq mi (13.9 km^{2})
- Elevation: 1,020 ft (310 m)

Population (2020)
  - Total: 2,039
  - Density: 43.86/sq mi (16.94/km^{2})
- Time zone: UTC-6 (Central (CST))
  - Summer (DST): UTC-5 (CDT)
- ZIP codes: 55804
- Area code: 218
- FIPS code: 27-17018
- GNIS feature ID: 0664006
- Website: https://www.duluthtownship.gov/

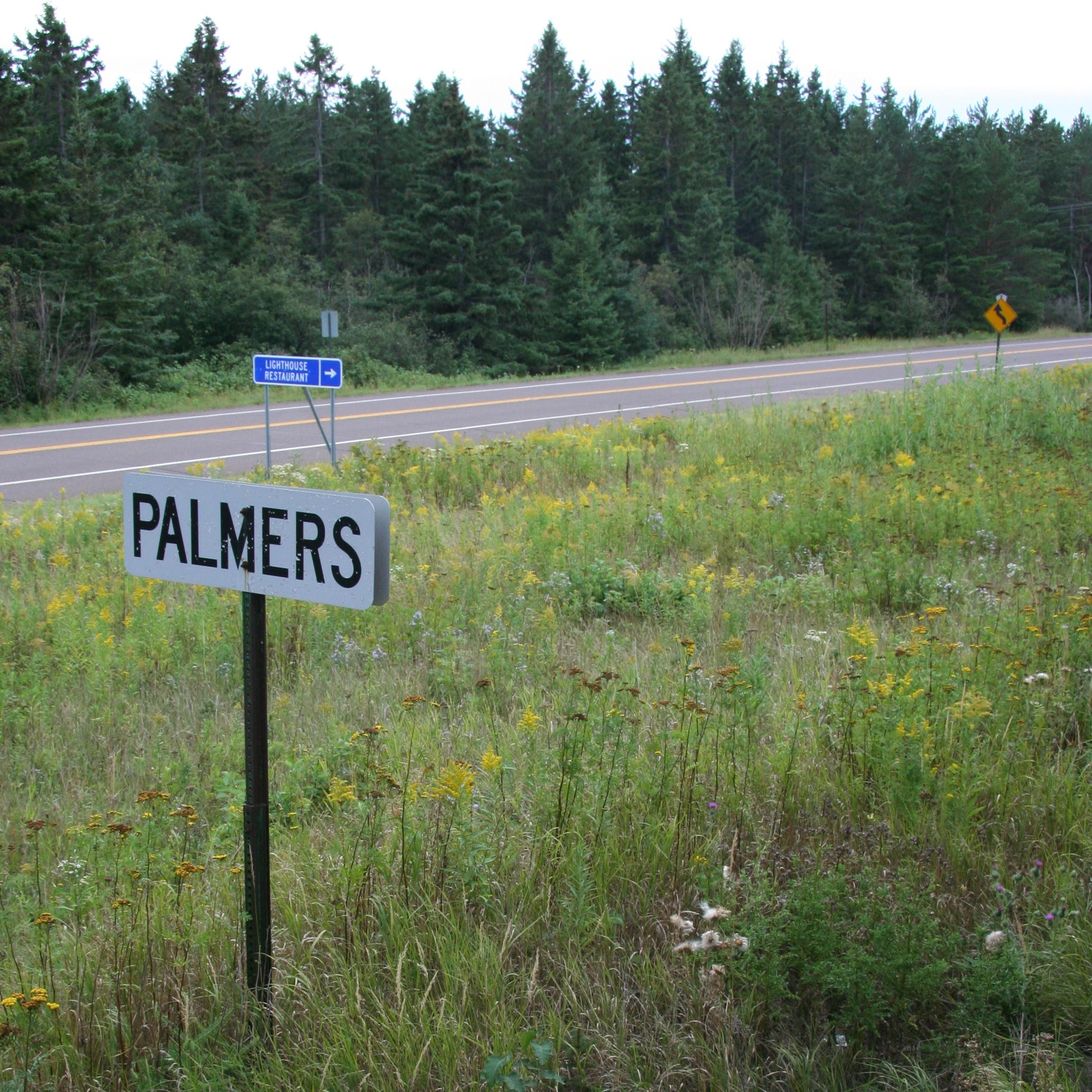
Railroad sign for the unincorporated community of Palmers, St. Louis County, Minnesota

Duluth Township is a township in Saint Louis County, Minnesota, United States. The population was 2,039 at the 2020 census.

The township is located on the North Shore of Lake Superior.

North Shore Scenic Drive (County Road 61), the Minnesota 61 Expressway (MN 61), and Homestead Road (County Road 42) are three of the main routes in the township.

McQuade Road runs north–south along Duluth Township's western boundary line with adjacent Lakewood and Normanna Townships.

The unincorporated communities of French River, Palmers, and Clover Valley are located within Duluth Township.

== Geography ==
According to the United States Census Bureau, the township has a total area of 51.8 square miles (134 km^{2}); 46.5 square miles (120 km^{2}) is land and 5.4 square miles (14 km^{2}), or 10.34%, is water.

The French River flows through the southwest part of Duluth Township. The Little Knife River, the Knife River, and the Little Sucker River, also flow through the township. Creeks that flow through the township include Big Sucker, Schmidt, and Stanley. The Talmadge River briefly enters the southwest corner of Duluth Township and flows into Lake Superior.

=== Adjacent townships, cities, and communities ===
The following are adjacent to Duluth Township :

- Lakewood Township (west)
- Normanna Township (west)
- North Star Township (northwest)
- Alden Township (north)
- The city of Duluth (southwest)
- The neighborhood of North Shore (southwest)
- Lake No. 2 Unorganized Territory of Lake County (east)
- The unincorporated community of Knife River (east)

=== Unincorporated communities ===
- French River
- Palmers
- Clover Valley

== Demographics ==
As of the census of 2000, there were 1,723 people, 669 households, and 479 families residing in the township. The population density was 37.1 inhabitants per square mile (14.3/km^{2}). There were 714 housing units at an average density of 15.4 per square mile (5.9/km^{2}). The racial makeup of the township was 98.26% White, 0.35% African American, 0.52% Native American, 0.12% from other races, and 0.75% from two or more races. Hispanic or Latino of any race were 0.46% of the population. 19.3% were of Norwegian, 14.6% German, 14.1% Swedish, 13.5% Finnish, 7.0% United States or American and 6.3% Irish ancestry according to Census 2000.

There were 669 households, out of which 30.2% had children under the age of 18 living with them, 64.4% were married couples living together, 5.1% had a female householder with no husband present, and 28.4% were non-families. 23.8% of all households were made up of individuals, and 6.1% had someone living alone who was 65 years of age or older. The average household size was 2.58 and the average family size was 3.09.

In the township the population was spread out, with 26.2% under the age of 18, 6.4% from 18 to 24, 26.5% from 25 to 44, 29.9% from 45 to 64, and 10.9% who were 65 years of age or older. The median age was 41 years. For every 100 females, there were 98.0 males. For every 100 females age 18 and over, there were 96.7 males.

The median income for a household in the township was $46,118, and the median income for a family was $57,292. Males had a median income of $42,381 versus $27,891 for females. The per capita income for the township was $23,116. About 1.7% of families and 4.1% of the population were below the poverty line, including 2.8% of those under age 18 and 4.5% of those age 65 or over.

== See also ==
- Minnesota 61 Expressway – MN 61
- Saint Louis County Road 61 – Scenic 61 – North Shore Scenic Drive
