= Alden Township, Minnesota =

Alden Township is the name of some places in the U.S. state of Minnesota:

- Alden Township, Freeborn County, Minnesota
- Alden Township, St. Louis County, Minnesota

== See also ==
- Alden Township (disambiguation)
