= Little Knife River =

Little Knife River may refer to:

- Little Knife River (Lake County, Minnesota)
- Little Knife River (St. Louis County, Minnesota)

== See also ==
- Knife River (disambiguation)
