= Gnesen Township, St. Louis County, Minnesota =

Gnesen Township, Minnesota
- Township
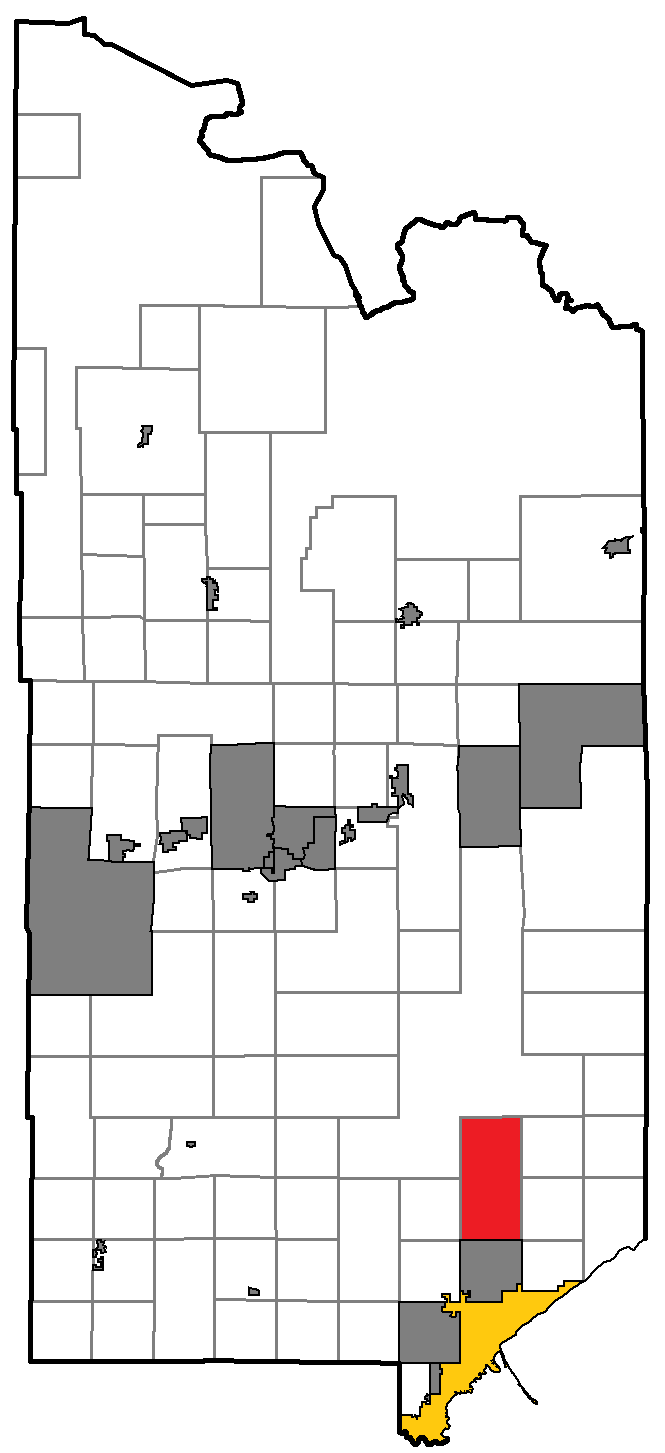
- Location of Gnesen Township within St. Louis County, Minnesota
- Coordinates: 47°1′8″N 92°7′25″W
- Country: United States
- State: Minnesota
- County: Saint Louis

Area
  - Total: 71.6 sq mi (185.5 km^{2})
  - Land: 61.5 sq mi (159.3 km^{2})
  - Water: 10.1 sq mi (26.2 km^{2})
- Elevation: 1,371 ft (418 m)

Population (2020)
  - Total: 1,931
  - Density: 31.40/sq mi (12.12/km^{2})
- Time zone: UTC-6 (Central (CST))
  - Summer (DST): UTC-5 (CDT)
- ZIP codes: 55803
- Area code: 218
- FIPS code: 27-24218
- GNIS feature ID: 0664284
- Website: gnesen.org

Gnesen Township is a township in Saint Louis County, Minnesota, United States. The population was 1,931 at the 2020 census.

Rice Lake Road (County Road 4) serves as a main route in Gnesen Township. Other routes include Normanna Road, Emerson Road, Howard Gnesen Road, Arnold Road, and West Pioneer Road.

== History ==
Gnesen Township was named after Gniezno (German: Gnesen), in modern-day Poland, which used to be a part of Prussia.

== Geography ==
According to the United States Census Bureau, the township has a total area of 71.6 square miles (185 km^{2}); 61.5 square miles (159 km^{2}) is land and 10.1 square miles (26 km^{2}), or 14.10%, is water.

Island Lake and Boulder Lake are both partially located within Gnesen Township.

The Lester River rises in Gnesen Township and flows generally southeastwardly through the city of Rice Lake and Lakewood Township, turning southward as it nears Lake Superior. The river flows into Lake Superior in eastern Duluth.

=== Adjacent townships ===
The following are adjacent to Gnesen Township :

- The city of Rice Lake (south)
- Lakewood Township (southeast)
- Normanna Township (east)
- North Star Township (northeast)
- Marion Lake Unorganized Territory (northeast)
- Fredenberg Township (west)
- Canosia Township (southwest)
- Whiteface Reservoir Unorganized Territory (north)

The northern 1/4 portion of Gnesen Township is located within the Cloquet Valley State Forest of Saint Louis County.

Lismore Road runs east–west along Gnesen Township's southern boundary line with adjacent city of Rice Lake.

Jean Duluth Road (County Road 37) runs north–south along Gnesen Township's eastern boundary line with adjacent Normanna Township.

Three Lakes Road (County Road 49) runs east–west along Gnesen Township's northern boundary line.

=== Unincorporated communities ===
- Island Lake

== Demographics ==
As of the census of 2000, there were 1,468 people, 582 households, and 439 families residing in the township. The population density was 23.9 inhabitants per square mile (9.2/km^{2}). There were 689 housing units at an average density of 11.2 per square mile (4.3/km^{2}). The racial makeup of the township was 98.09% White, 0.27% African American, 0.82% Native American, 0.27% Asian, 0.07% Pacific Islander, 0.20% from other races, and 0.27% from two or more races. Hispanic or Latino of any race were 0.48% of the population.

There were 582 households, out of which 30.4% had children under the age of 18 living with them, 67.9% were married couples living together, 3.8% had a female householder with no husband present, and 24.4% were non-families. 19.4% of all households were made up of individuals, and 5.2% had someone living alone who was 65 years of age or older. The average household size was 2.52 and the average family size was 2.90.

In the township the population was spread out, with 24.2% under the age of 18, 5.7% from 18 to 24, 28.4% from 25 to 44, 31.4% from 45 to 64, and 10.3% who were 65 years of age or older. The median age was 41 years. For every 100 females, there were 108.5 males. For every 100 females age 18 and over, there were 110.4 males.

The median income for a household in the township was $57,292, and the median income for a family was $62,569. Males had a median income of $41,333 versus $26,579 for females. The per capita income for the township was $26,202. About 3.0% of families and 4.5% of the population were below the poverty line, including 4.6% of those under age 18 and 1.4% of those age 65 or over.

== See also ==
- Gniezno, city in Poland
