= Alden Township =

There are six places called Alden Township in the United States:

- Alden Township, McHenry County, Illinois
- Alden Township, Hardin County, Iowa
- Alden Township, Freeborn County, Minnesota
- Alden Township, St. Louis County, Minnesota
- Alden Township, Hettinger County, North Dakota
- Alden Township, Hand County, South Dakota
