= Lakeside – Lester Park (Duluth) =

Neighbourhood in Duluth, Minnesota

Coordinates: 46°50′15″N 92°01′11″W

- Neighborhood
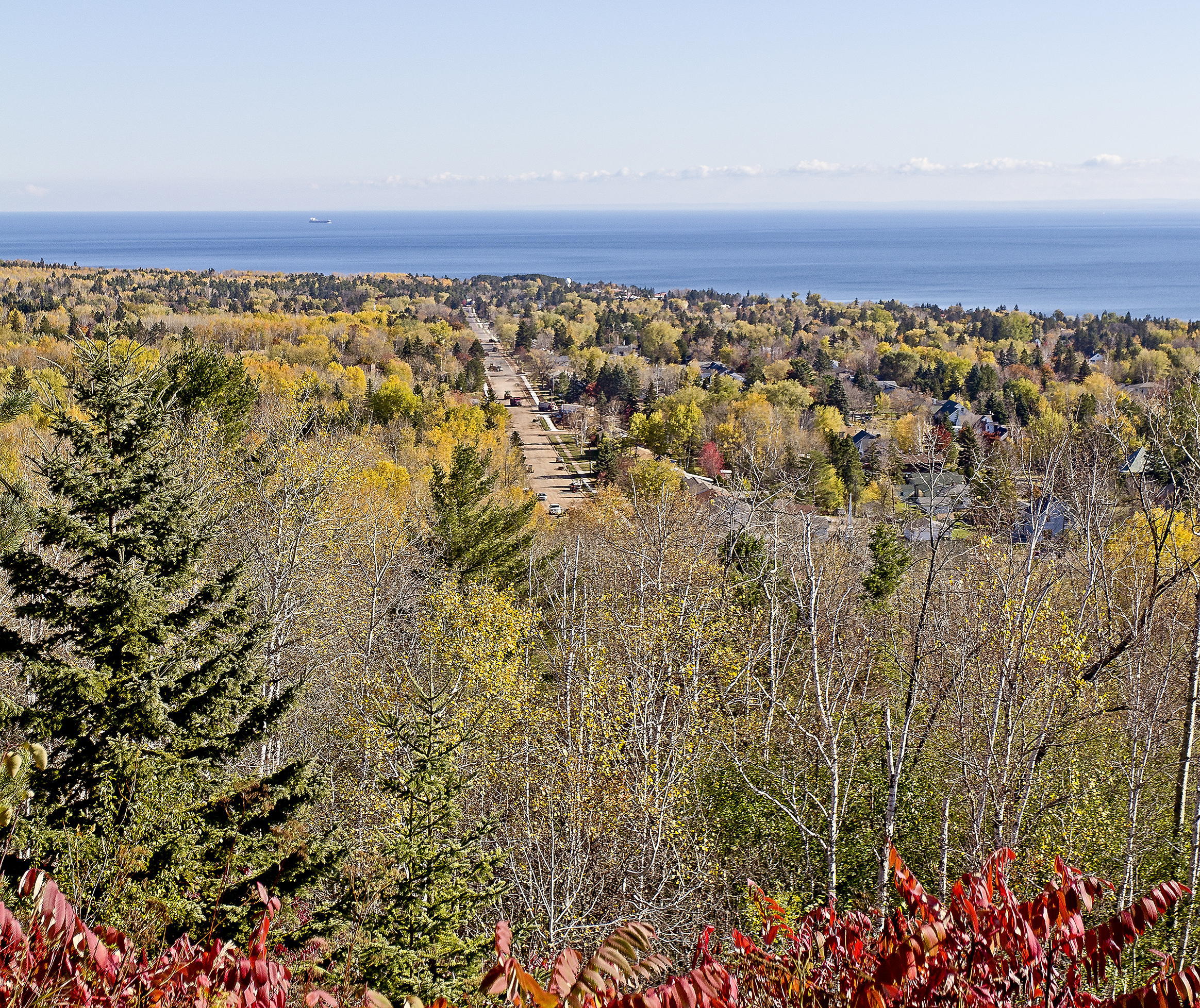
- View of neighborhood from Hawk Ridge

- Location within Duluth
- Country: United States
- State: Minnesota
- City: Duluth
- Time zone: UTC-6 (CST)
  - Summer (DST): UTC-5 (CDT)

Lakeside – Lester Park is a neighborhood located in the eastern part of Duluth, Minnesota, situated along the North Shore of Lake Superior. Its landscape is marked by the expansive Lester Park and Lester River. The neighborhood has several tree-lined streets and a commercial corridor. Lester Park Golf Course and Lester Park Elementary School are also located in the neighborhood.

== History ==
In 1871, Hugh McCulloch, the former U.S. Secretary of the Treasury under President Lincoln, purchased property and platted what would become Lakeside and Lester Park. In 1886, George's son William Sargent and others formed the Lakeside Land Company, initially naming the area "New London".

The Duluth and Iron Range Railroad tracks were laid in 1890 which connected Duluth to northern towns, followed by a "Short Line" train service that operated until 1892. This was replaced by a streetcar line installed by the Lakeside Land Company, with depots at locations like 51st Avenue East (Crosley Station) and 47th Avenue East (London Station, which also served as the first post office).

On March 30, 1889, the area officially incorporated as the Village of Lakeside. On January 1, 1893, Lakeside was annexed into the City of Duluth. Even after annexation, the neighborhood was sometimes referred to separately as Lakeside and Lester Park as late as the 1990s.

The Cloquet Fire of 1918, a massive wildfire destroyed seven homes between 41st and 60th Avenues East. Dairy farms like Pickering & Brothers in the Crosley Park addition were also wiped out. Much of the area's livestock was lost. Unlike harder-hit regions, Lakeside-Lester Park did not experience a large loss of life.

Until 2016 Lakeside was a "dry neighborhood". No alcohol was sold in store or available for purchase and restaurants. There were no laws against residents consuming alcohol in their own home or at private events. The ban was ended by the city council in 2016 following a non-binding citywide referendum.

=== Structures ===
The Lester River Fish Hatchery, listed on the National Register of Historic Places, was built in 1882. It is owned by University of Minnesota Duluth, and temporarily housed the Great Lakes Aquarium administrative offices at the beginning of the aquarium's operations. The complex consists of the Hatchery/Bunk-room Building, Boat House, Pump House, Supervisor's Cabin on the south side of Congdon Boulevard, and a Superintendent's House on the north side of Congdon Boulevard.

Another historic structure is 5217 London Road. The house was originally built in 1889 at the former New London School, a four-room schoolhouse located at Regent Street and 46th Avenue East. It was deconstructed in 1900, moved to its current location, and rebuilt as a house for Bradford C. Church, then president of the Imperial Milling Company in Duluth.

== Geography ==
The neighborhood stretches along the eastern edge of Duluth, from 40th Avenue East to 60th Avenue East. London Road (MN 61), East Superior Street, and Glenwood Street serve as main routes in the community.

The neighborhood also encompasses the Lester River and includes Lester Park, known for its hiking trails and waterfalls.

=== Hawk Ridge ===
Located just above Lakeside, is Hawk Ridge, a place in the fall for "Hawk Watch", which many do all year round. It looks over lakeside towards Lake Superior, and if you travel down the road you will cross Seven Bridges road, taking a scenic way through Lakeside.

== Demographics ==
Lakeside – Lester Park is mostly White, with 93.8% of the population identifying as such. About 4.5% of residents are of two or more races, and the remaining 1.7% are other races.

The primary language spoken at home in Lakeside – Lester Park is English with 97.4% of residents speaking it. Other languages make up the remaining 2.6%.

The residents of the neighborhood show a high educational attainment. Only 3.0% have less than a high school education, and just 14.5% have a high school diploma or less. 20.5% possess a graduate or professional degree. Overall, 97.0% of residents are high school graduates or higher, with 53.2% having a bachelor's degree or higher.

== Festival ==
The Lester River Rendezvous festival takes place every September in the neighborhood. This annual event draws people from all over since 1998. It also is a time of neighborhood and community togetherness. The event is sponsored by the Lakeside–Lester Park Business Association and the Duluth Parks and Recreation Department. This fall tradition in Lester Park features food, crafts, and entertainment.

A special feature of the Lester River Rendezvous is the Voyageur Village, where members play out the day in the life of a voyageurs camp from the late 18th century in northern Minnesota. This re-enactment by local residents includes dressing up as voyageurs in the fur trading era, demonstrating outdoor cooking techniques, as well as telling stories of their historic adventures.

There are also games by the Duluth Children's Museum and pony rides. Musicians perform either at the park stage, strolling the park, or at the entrance gates.

== See also ==
- London Road – Highway 61
- Lester River Road – Saint Louis County Road 12
- Lester Park Golf Course
- St. Louis County, Minnesota
