= North Shore (Duluth) =

Neighborhood of Duluth, Minnesota

Coordinates: 46.8880°N 91.9203°W

North Shore is a neighborhood in Duluth, Minnesota, United States.

North Shore Scenic Drive (Congdon Boulevard) serves as a main route in the community, and is a gateway to the North Shore of Lake Superior.

The North Shore neighborhood is situated between 67th Avenue East and 96th Avenue East. The neighborhood stretches from Brighton Beach (Kitchi Gammi) to McQuade Road, following both Congdon Boulevard (County 61 / Scenic 61) and the Minnesota 61 Expressway (MN 61).

== Adjacent neighborhoods ==
(Directions following those of Duluth's general street grid system, not actual geographical coordinates)

- Lakeside – Lester Park (west)
- Lakewood Township (north)
- Duluth Township (north, east)
