= Lakewood Township, St. Louis County, Minnesota =

Lakewood Township, Minnesota
- Township
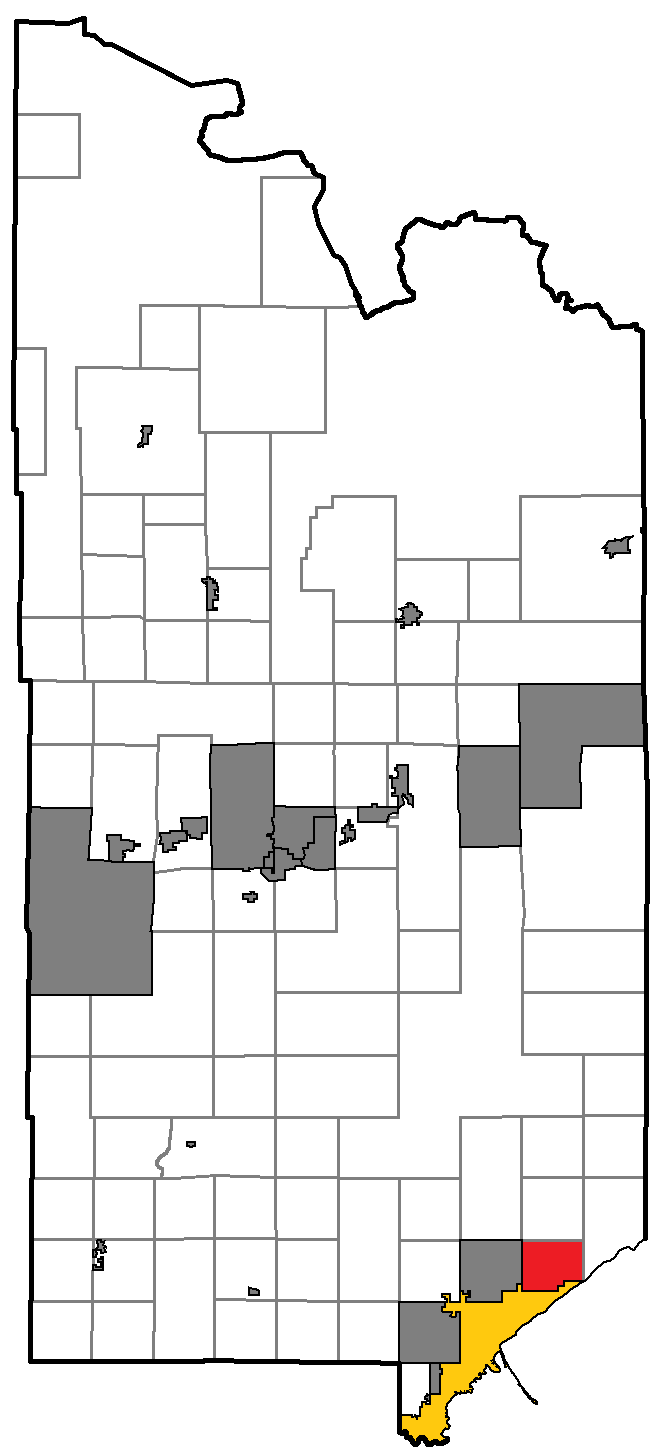
- Location of Lakewood Township within St. Louis County, Minnesota
- Coordinates: 46°54′41″N 91°59′07″W
- Country: United States
- State: Minnesota
- County: Saint Louis

Area
  - Total: 27.8 sq mi (72 km^{2})
  - Land: 27.8 sq mi (72 km^{2})

Population (2020)
  - Total: 2,276
  - Density: 81.9/sq mi (31.6/km^{2})
- Time zone: UTC-6 (Central (CST))
  - Summer (DST): UTC-5 (CDT)
- ZIP codes: 55803 and 55804
- Area code: 218
- FIPS code: 27-47120
- Website: https://sites.google.com/view/townoflakewoodmn

Lakewood Township is a township in Saint Louis County, Minnesota, United States. The population was 2,276 at the 2020 census.

Jean Duluth Road, West Tischer Road, North Tischer Road, Lakewood Road, and Strand Road are five of the main routes in the township.

Lakewood Township was named for its groves.

== Geography ==
According to the United States Census Bureau, the township has a total area of 27.8 square miles (72 km^{2}), all land.

The French River flows through the northeast corner of the township. The Lester River flows through the western portion of Lakewood Township. The Talmadge River also flows through the township.

=== Adjacent townships, cities, and communities ===
The following are adjacent to Lakewood Township :

- The city of Rice Lake (west)
- Duluth Township (east)
- Normanna Township (north)
- Gnesen Township (northwest)
- The city of Duluth (south)
- The neighborhood of Lakeside – Lester Park (south)
- The neighborhood of Morley Heights / Parkview (south)
- The neighborhood of North Shore (south)

Jean Duluth Road (County Road 37) runs north–south along Lakewood Township's western boundary line with adjacent city of Rice Lake.

McQuade Road runs north–south along Lakewood Township's eastern boundary line with adjacent Duluth Township.

Lismore Road runs east–west along Lakewood Township's northern boundary line with adjacent Normanna Township. Zimmerman Road is also in the vicinity.

Medin Road runs east–west near Lakewood Township's southern boundary line with adjacent city of Duluth in the southwest corner of the township. Oak Street follows the actual southern boundary line in two separate disjointed sections.

Lester River Road (County Road 12) runs north–south through the middle of the township.

== Demographics ==
As of the census of 2000, there were 2,013 people, 710 households, and 553 families living in the township. The population density was 72.5 inhabitants per square mile (28.0/km^{2}). There were 735 housing units at an average density of 26.5 per square mile (10.2/km^{2}). The racial makeup of the township was 97.81% White, 0.35% African American, 0.50% Native American, 0.40% Asian, 0.15% from other races, and 0.79% from two or more races. Hispanic or Latino of any race were 0.40% of the population.

There were 710 households, out of which 39.3% had children under the age of 18 living with them, 71.0% were married couples living together, 3.8% had a female householder with no husband present, and 22.0% were non-families. 17.9% of all households were made up of individuals, and 4.8% had someone living alone who was 65 years of age or older. The average household size was 2.84 and the average family size was 3.23.

In the township the population was spread out, with 30.6% under the age of 18, 5.7% from 18 to 24, 29.0% from 25 to 44, 27.4% from 45 to 64, and 7.4% who were 65 years of age or older. The median age was 39 years. For every 100 females, there were 105.4 males. For every 100 females age 18 and over, there were 102.0 males.

The median income for a household in the township was $51,700, and the median income for a family was $56,833. Males had a median income of $40,329 versus $27,222 for females. The per capita income for the township was $21,086. About 3.5% of families and 6.3% of the population were below the poverty line, including 10.7% of those under the age of 18 and 2.1% of those age 65 or over.

== See also ==
- Saint Louis County Road 37 – Jean Duluth Road
