= Clover Valley =

Clover Valley can refer to the following:

- Clover Valley, Bruce County, Ontario, a community in Huron-Kinloss Township, Ontario, Canada
- Clover Valley, Manitoulin District, Ontario, a community in Assiginack Township, Ontario, Canada
- Clover Valley, Minnesota, an unincorporated community in Saint Louis County, Minnesota, United States
- Clover Valley (Nevada), in Elko County
- Clover Valley, a Dollar General store brand
