= Mayflower (scow-schooner) =

Wooden hulled scow schooner that sank in Lake Superior

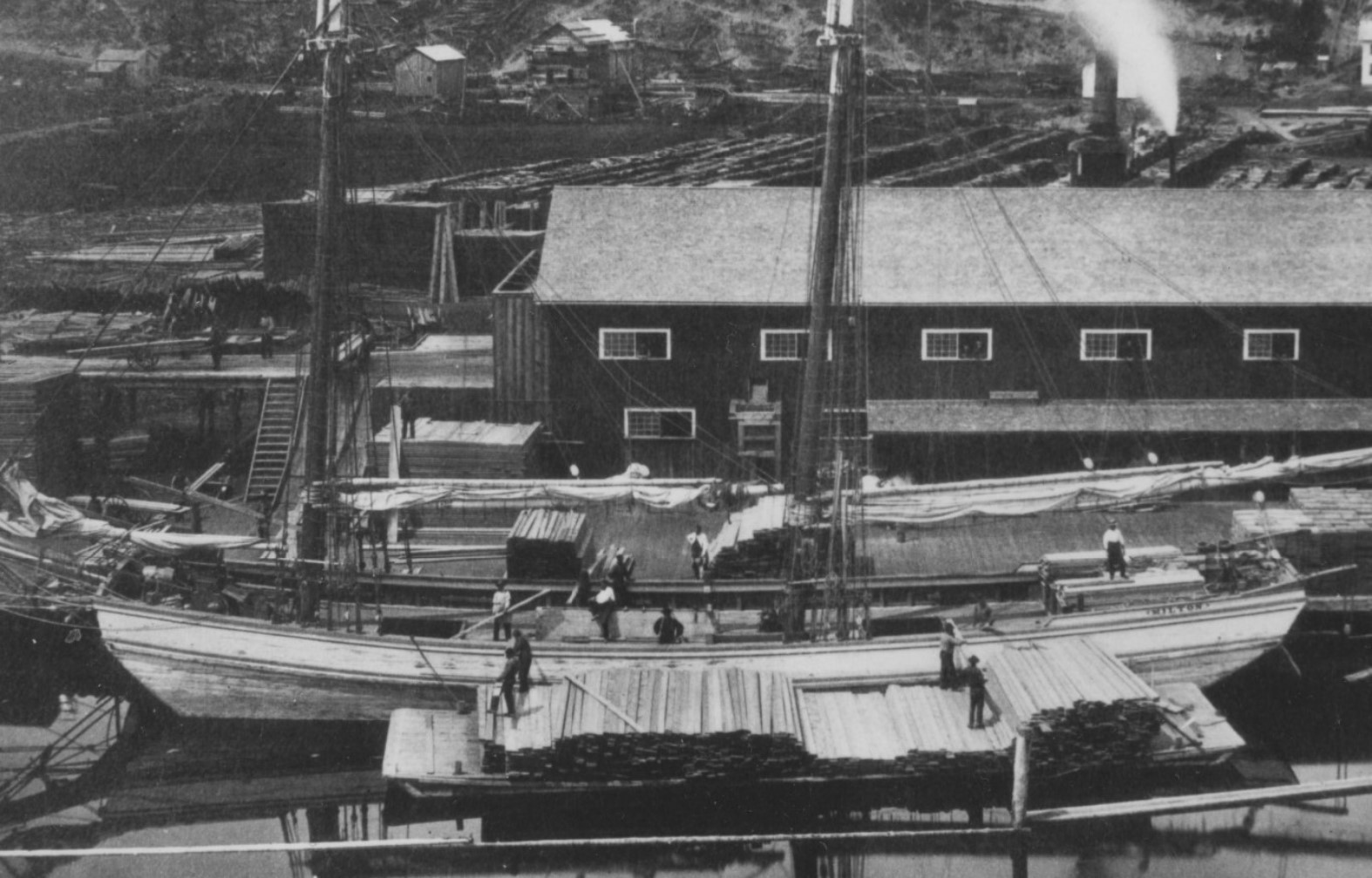
- A photograph of the Milton, which was similar in design to the Mayflower

History

United States
- Name: May Flower
- Port of registry: U.S. Registry #92025
- Builder: Harry Johnson
- Launched: 1887
- In service: 1887
- Fate: Sunk June 2, 1891

General characteristics
- Type: scow-schooner
- Tonnage: 230.4 GRT; 218.88 NRT
- Length: 147.3 ft (44.9 m)
- Beam: 27 ft (8.2 m)
- Depth: 7.3 ft (2.2 m)
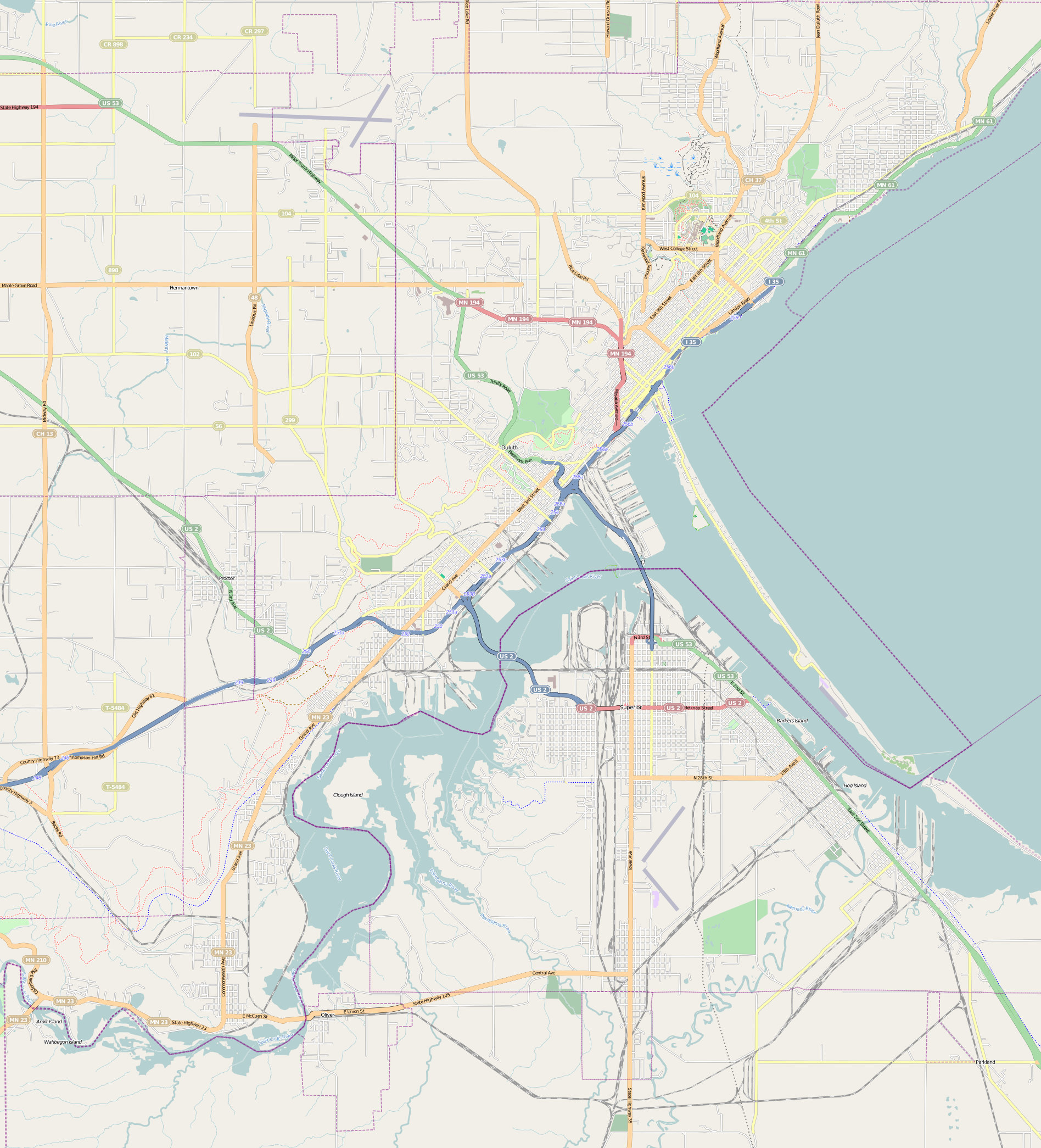

National Register of Historic Places data
May Flower (shipwreck)
U.S. National Register of Historic Places
Location within Duluth Location within Minnesota Location within the United States
Location	2.25 miles (3.62 km) south of the Lester River in Lake Superior
Coordinates	46°48′12″N 92°0′40″W
Area	Less than one acre
Built	1887
Architect	Harry Johnson
Architectural style	Scow schooner
MPS	Minnesota's Lake Superior Shipwrecks MPS
NRHP reference No.	12000560
Added to NRHP	August 28, 2012

Mayflower was a wooden hulled scow-schooner that sank on June 2, 1891, in Lake Superior near Duluth, Minnesota, United States, after capsizing with a load of sandstone blocks. In 2012 the shipwreck site was added to the National Register of Historic Places.

== History ==
The Mayflower (official number 92025) was built in 1887 in Sturgeon Bay, Wisconsin, by master carpenter Harry Johnson. She had a length of 147.3 feet (44.9 m), her beam was 27 feet (8.2 m) wide and her hull was 7.3 feet (2.2 m) deep. She had a gross register tonnage of 230.4 tons, and a net register tonnage of 218.88 tons. She was a two-masted scow schooner which meant that she could sail on her own, or towed by a steam-powered vessel. Although she was a Great Lakes scow, her constructional features are more similar to the scows used in New Zealand than the scows used on the lakes.

== Final voyage ==
On the day of June 2, 1891, the Mayflower was bound for the Duluth, Minnesota, with a cargo of sandstone which was to be used in the construction of the Central High School. She was sailing in good weather and was propelled by a wind blowing from the northwest. Her master Captain Theodore Zirbest ordered the Mayflower's sails to be lowered. Soon after her sails were lowered, the Mayflower's cargo shifted; this caused her to capsize. Three of her crew members were saved by the tugboat Cora A. Sheldon, but Captain Zirbest lost his grip on the lifeline that was thrown to him, and drowned.

Historical accounts are unclear about whether the Mayflower was sailing under her own power, or she was being towed by the Cora A. Sheldon.

== The Mayflower today ==
The wreck of the Mayflower was discovered in 1991. Her remains lie in 90 feet (27 m) of water about 500 feet (150 m) off the busy shipping lane about four miles (6 km) east of the Duluth Harbor entry. Her hull is partially buried in sand, featuring an intact bow and stern, but her midsection is broken and almost completely covered with sand. Visibility at the site is usually poor; this is because she is close to the Lester River. The visibility varies from 10 feet (3 m) to 15 feet (4.6 m), although the visibility seems to be the best in the autumn. Her anchors and windlass both still remain attached to her bow. Her windlass is the only known one of its type in Minnesota waters. Today only two partially intact scows are known to exist on Lake Superior: the Mayflower in Minnesota and the Grey Oak in Thunder Bay.

The wreck site was listed on the National Register of Historic Places in 2012 for its state-level significance in the themes of commerce, historical archaeology, and maritime history. It was nominated for its informational potential in illuminating late-19th-century wooden shipbuilding methods and maritime life. The Mayflower holds particular value due to the rarity of her type and her atypical design.

== See also ==
- National Register of Historic Places listings in St. Louis County, Minnesota
