= Knife River (disambiguation) =

The Knife River is a tributary of the Missouri River in the US state of North Dakota.

Knife River may also refer to:

== Rivers ==
- Knife River (Lake Superior), a tributary of Lake Superior, in Minnesota, US
- Knife River (Snake River tributary), in Minnesota, US
- Knife River (Minnesota–Ontario), US and Canada
- North Knife River and South Knife River, Manitoba, Canada; see List of rivers of the Americas by coastline § Arctic Ocean coast

== Places ==
- Knife River, Minnesota
- Knife River, Montana

== Other ==
- Knife River Indian Villages National Historic Site, North Dakota
- Knife River Corporation, a construction materials company owned by MDU Resources

== See also ==
- Little Knife River (disambiguation)
