= Migration of the red-tailed hawk =

Many populations of red-tailed hawks, broadly excluding those in Canada and Alaska, are migratory. They appear to migrate one-by-one rather than in groups.

== Partial migration ==
Red-tailed hawks are considered partial migrants, as in about the northern third of their distribution, which is most of their range in Canada and Alaska, they almost entirely vacate their breeding grounds. In coastal areas of the north, however, such as in the Pacific Northwest to southern Alaska and in Nova Scotia on the Atlantic, red-tailed hawks do not usually migrate. More or less, any area where snow cover is nearly continuous during the winter shows an extended absence of most red-tailed hawks, so some areas as far south as Montana may show strong seasonal vacancies of red-tails. In southern Michigan, immature red-tailed hawks tended to remain in winter only when voles were abundant.

During relatively long, harsh winters in Michigan, many more young ones were reported in northeastern Mexico. To the opposite extreme, hawks residing as far north as Fairbanks, Alaska, may persevere through the winter on their home territory, as was recorded with one male over three consecutive years. Birds of any age tend to be territorial during winter but may shift ranges whenever food requirements demand it. Wintering birds tend to perch on inconspicuous tree perches, seeking shelter especially if they have a full crop or are in the midst of poor or overly windy weather. Adult wintering red-tails tend to perch more prominently than immatures do, which select lower or more secluded perches. Immatures are often missed in winter bird counts, unless they are being displaced by dominant adults. Generally, though, immatures can seem to recognize that they are less likely to be attacked by adults during winter and can perch surprisingly close to them. Age is the most significant consideration of wintering hawks' hierarchy, but size does factor in, as larger immatures (presumably usually females) are less likely to displaced than smaller ones.

Dark adult red-tailed hawks appear to be harder to locate when perched than other red-tails. In Oklahoma, for example, wintering adult Harlan's hawks were rarely engaged in fights or chased by other red-tails. These hawks tended to gather in regional pockets and frequently the same ones occurred year-to-year. In general, migratory behavior is complex and reliant on each individual hawk's decision-making (i.e. whether prey populations are sufficient to entice the hawk to endure prolonged snow cover). During fall migration, departure may occur as soon as late September, but peak movements occur in late October and all of November in the United States, with migration ceasing after mid-December. The northernmost migrants may pass over resident red-tailed hawks in the contiguous United States, while the latter are still in the midst of brooding fledglings. Not infrequently, several autumn hawk watches in Ontario, Quebec and the northern United States record 4,500–8,900 red-tailed hawks migrating through each fall, with records of up to 15,000 in a season at Hawk Ridge hawk watch in Duluth, Minnesota.

Unlike some other Buteo species, such as Swainson's hawks and broad-winged hawks, red-tailed hawks do not usually migrate in groups, instead passing by one-by-one, and only migrate on days when winds are favorable. Most migrants do not move past southern Mexico in late autumn, but a few North American migrants may annually move as far south as breeding red-tailed hawks happen to occur, i.e. in Central America to as far south Panama. However, a few records were reported of wintering migrant red-tails turning up in Colombia, the first records of them anywhere in South America. Spring northward movements may commence as early as late February, with peak numbers usually occurring in late March and early April. Seasonal counts may include up to 19,000 red-tails in spring at Derby Hill hawk watch, in Oswego, New York, sometimes more than 5,000 are recorded in a day there. The most northerly migratory individuals may not reach breeding grounds until June, even adults.

Immature hawks migrate later than adults in spring on average, but not, generally speaking, in autumn. In the northern Great Lakes, immatures return in late May to early June, when adults are already well into their nesting season and must find unoccupied ranges. In Alaska, adults tend to migrate before immatures in early to mid-September, to the contrary of other areas, probably as heavy snowfall begins. Yearlings that were banded in southwestern Idaho stayed for about 2 months after fledging, and then traveled long distances with a strong directional bias, with 9 of 12 recovered southeast of the study area (six of these moved south to coastal lowlands in Mexico and as far as Guatemala, 4,205 km (2,613 mi) from their initial banding.) In California, 35 hawks were banded as nestlings; 26 were recovered at less than 50 miles away, with multidirectional juvenile dispersals. Nestlings banded in Southern California sometimes actually traveled north as far as 1,190 km (740 mi) to Oregon, ranging to the opposite extreme as far as a banded bird from the Sierra Nevadas that moved 1,700 km (1,100 mi) south to Sinaloa. Nestlings banded in Green County, Wisconsin, did not travel very far comparatively by October–November, but by December, recoveries were found in states including Illinois, Iowa, Texas, Louisiana, and Florida.
