= Normanna Township, St. Louis County, Minnesota =

Normanna Township, Minnesota
- Township
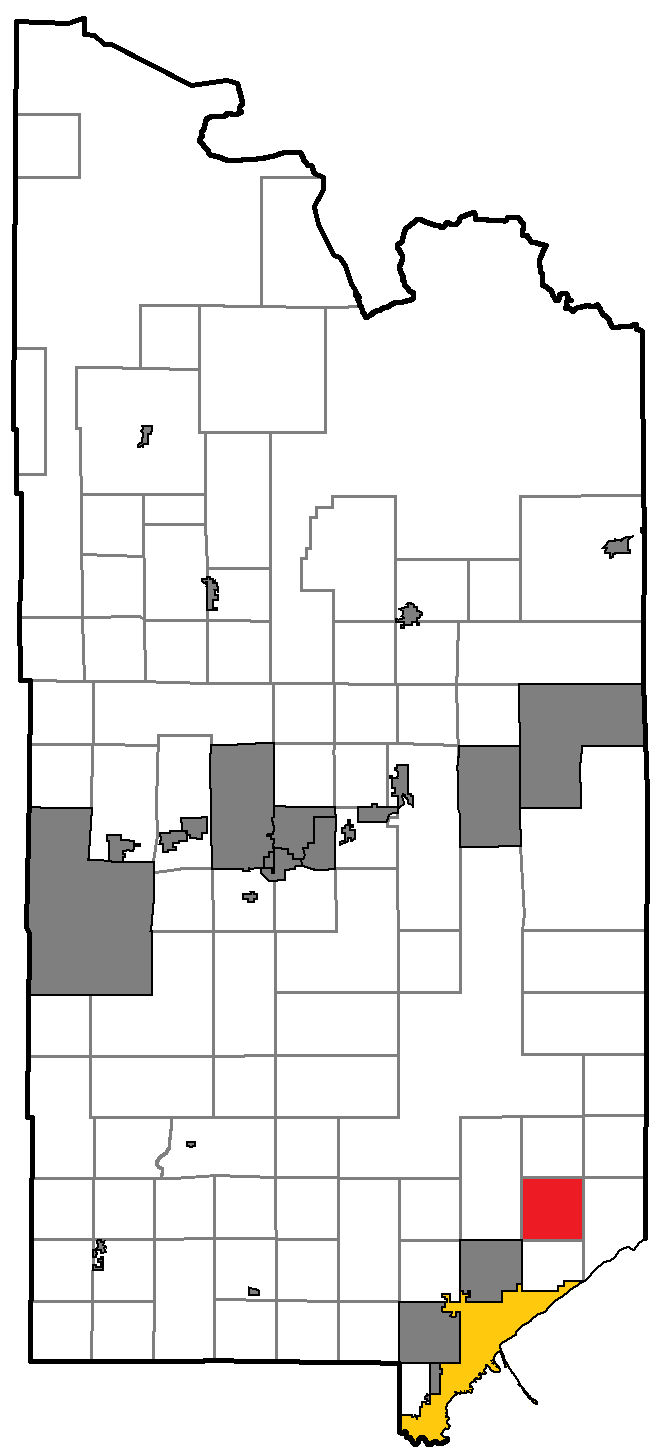
- Location of Normanna Township within St. Louis County, Minnesota
- Coordinates: 46°59′12″N 91°58′26″W
- Country: United States
- State: Minnesota
- County: Saint Louis

Area
  - Total: 36.5 sq mi (94.5 km^{2})
  - Land: 36.4 sq mi (94.4 km^{2})
  - Water: 0.039 sq mi (0.1 km^{2})
- Elevation: 1,388 ft (423 m)

Population (2020)
  - Total: 769
  - Density: 21.1/sq mi (8.15/km^{2})
- Time zone: UTC-6 (Central (CST))
  - Summer (DST): UTC-5 (CDT)
- ZIP codes: 55804
- Area code: 218
- FIPS code: 27-46708
- GNIS feature ID: 0665141
- Website: www.normanna.org

Normanna Township is a township in Saint Louis County, Minnesota, United States. The population was 769 at the 2020 census.

Jean Duluth Road, Normanna Road, and Pequaywan Lake Road are three of the main routes in the township. Other routes include North Tischer Road, East Pioneer Road, and French River Road.

== History ==
Normanna Township was named for the Norwegians who settled in the area.

== Geography ==
According to the United States Census Bureau, the township has a total area of 36.5 square miles (95 km^{2}); 0.04 square miles (0.10 km^{2}), or 0.11%, is water.

The French River and Big Sucker Creek both flow through the township.

=== Adjacent townships ===
The following are adjacent to Normanna Township :

- Lakewood Township (south)
- Duluth Township (east and southeast)
- Gnesen Township (west)
- North Star Township (north)
- Alden Township (northeast)
- The city of Rice Lake (southwest)

The Cloquet Valley State Forest is to the immediate north of Normanna Township.

Jean Duluth Road (County Road 37) runs north–south along Normanna Township's western boundary line with adjacent Gnesen Township.

McQuade Road runs north–south along Normanna Township's eastern boundary line with adjacent Duluth Township.

Lismore Road runs east–west along Normanna Township's southern boundary line with adjacent Lakewood Township. Zimmerman Road is also in the vicinity.

== Demographics ==
At the 2000 census there were 637 people, 219 households, and 169 families living in the township. The population density was 17.5 people per square mile (6.7/km^{2}). There were 227 housing units at an average density of 6.2/sq mi (2.4/km^{2}). The racial makeup of the township was 98.59% White, 0.47% Native American, 0.78% Asian, and 0.16% from two or more races. Hispanic or Latino of any race were 0.78%.

Of the 219 households 41.1% had children under the age of 18 living with them, 70.3% were married couples living together, 1.8% had a female householder with no husband present, and 22.4% were non-families. 15.1% of households were one person and 3.7% were one person aged 65 or older. The average household size was 2.91 and the average family size was 3.30.

The age distribution was 30.1% under the age of 18, 6.3% from 18 to 24, 31.2% from 25 to 44, 25.9% from 45 to 64, and 6.4% 65 or older. The median age was 36 years. For every 100 females, there were 106.1 males. For every 100 females age 18 and over, there were 106.0 males.

The median household income was $52,000 and the median family income was $60,556. Males had a median income of $42,188 versus $24,167 for females. The per capita income for the township was $19,127. About 1.2% of families and 3.4% of the population were below the poverty line, including none of those under the age of eighteen or sixty-five or over.
