= North Star Township, St. Louis County, Minnesota =

North Star Township, Minnesota
- Township
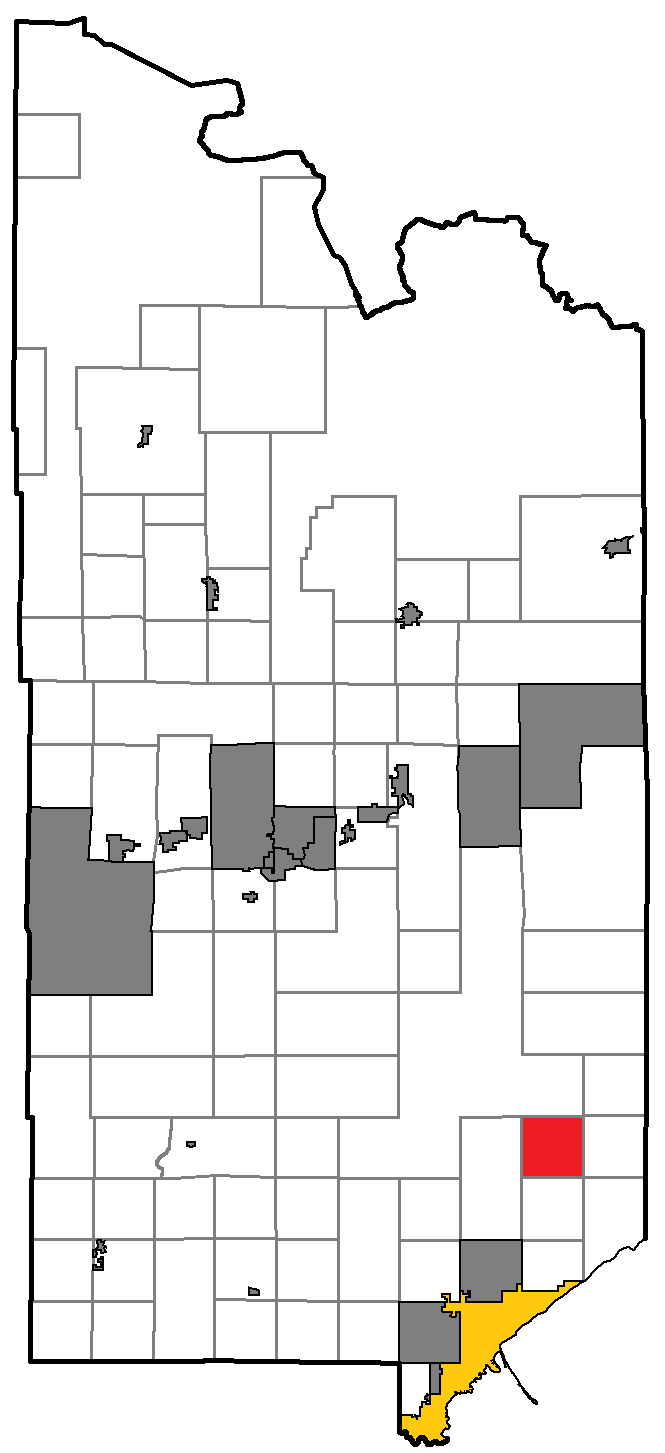
- Location of North Star Township within St. Louis County, Minnesota
- Coordinates: 47°3′29″N 91°59′53″W
- Country: United States
- State: Minnesota
- County: Saint Louis

Area
  - Total: 35.6 sq mi (92.1 km^{2})
  - Land: 33.3 sq mi (86.3 km^{2})
  - Water: 2.3 sq mi (5.9 km^{2})
- Elevation: 1,450 ft (442 m)

Population (2020)
  - Total: 206
  - Density: 6.18/sq mi (2.39/km^{2})
- Time zone: UTC-6 (Central (CST))
  - Summer (DST): UTC-5 (CDT)
- ZIP codes: 55803
- Area code: 218
- FIPS code: 27-47255
- GNIS feature ID: 0665171
- Website: https://www.northstarmn.net/

North Star Township is a township in Saint Louis County, Minnesota, United States. The population was 206 at the 2020 census.

Pequaywan Lake Road (Saint Louis County Road 44) serves as a main route in the township.

== Geography ==
According to the United States Census Bureau, the township has a total area of 35.6 square miles (92 km^{2}); 33.3 square miles (86 km^{2}) is land and 2.3 square miles (6.0 km^{2}), or 6.41%, is water.

The Cloquet River flows through the western portion of North Star Township.

=== Adjacent townships ===
The following are adjacent to North Star Township :

- Normanna Township (south)
- Alden Township (east)
- Pequaywan Township (northeast)
- Duluth Township (southeast)
- Gnesen Township (west and southwest)
- Marion Lake Unorganized Territory (north)

The northern portion of North Star Township is located within the Cloquet Valley State Forest.

== Demographics ==
At the 2000 census there were 203 people, 74 households, and 58 families living in the township. The population density was 6.1 people per square mile (2.4/km^{2}). There were 135 housing units at an average density of 4.1/sq mi (1.6/km^{2}). The racial makeup of the township was 97.04% White, 0.99% Native American, 0.49% Asian, and 1.48% from two or more races. Of the 74 households 29.7% had children under the age of 18 living with them, 68.9% were married couples living together, 6.8% had a female householder with no husband present, and 21.6% were non-families. 16.2% of households were one person and 2.7% were one person aged 65 or older. The average household size was 2.74 and the average family size was 3.05.

The age distribution was 25.6% under the age of 18, 4.9% from 18 to 24, 26.1% from 25 to 44, 34.0% from 45 to 64, and 9.4% 65 or older. The median age was 41 years. For every 100 females, there were 116.0 males. For every 100 females age 18 and over, there were 118.8 males.

The median household income was $51,875 and the median family income was $61,250. Males had a median income of $50,625 versus $23,125 for females. The per capita income for the township was $19,640. About 5.6% of families and 8.8% of the population were below the poverty line, including none of those under the age of eighteen and 25.0% of those sixty five or over.
