= Pequaywan Township, St. Louis County, Minnesota =

Pequaywan Township, Minnesota
- Township
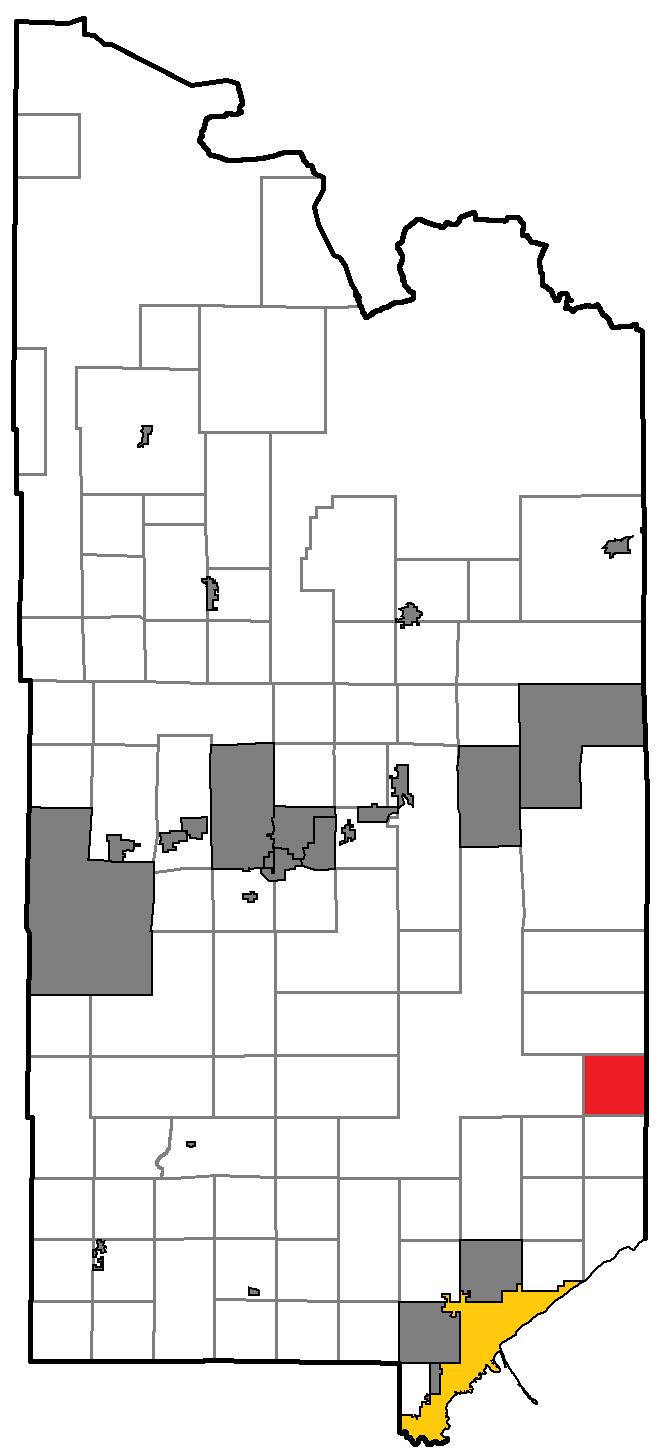
- Location of Pequaywan Township within St. Louis County, Minnesota
- Coordinates: 47°10′47″N 91°53′4″W
- Country: United States
- State: Minnesota
- County: Saint Louis

Area
  - Total: 36.1 sq mi (93.6 km^{2})
  - Land: 33.9 sq mi (87.9 km^{2})
  - Water: 2.2 sq mi (5.7 km^{2})
- Elevation: 1,572 ft (479 m)

Population (2020)
  - Total: 139
  - Density: 4.10/sq mi (1.58/km^{2})
- Time zone: UTC-6 (Central (CST))
  - Summer (DST): UTC-5 (CDT)
- ZIP codes: 55803
- Area code: 218
- FIPS code: 27-50389
- GNIS feature ID: 0665280
- Website: https://pequaywantownship.gov/

Pequaywan Township is a township in Saint Louis County, Minnesota, United States. The population was 139 at the 2020 census.

Pequaywan Lake Road (Saint Louis County Road 44) serves as a main route in the township.

In his book Minnesota Place Names, Warren Upham cites the word pequaywan as "an Ojibwe name of undetermined meaning".

== Geography ==
According to the United States Census Bureau, the township has a total area of 36.1 square miles (93 km^{2}); 33.9 square miles (88 km^{2}) is land and 2.2 square miles (5.7 km^{2}), or 6.06%, is water.

Pequaywan Township is located within the Cloquet Valley State Forest.

=== Adjacent townships ===
The following are adjacent to Pequaywan Township :

- Alden Township (south)
- North Star Township (southwest)
- Ault Township (north)
- Marion Lake Unorganized Territory (west)
- Lake No. 2 Unorganized Territory of Lake County (east)

== Demographics ==
As of the census of 2000, there were 133 people, 62 households, and 38 families living in the township. The population density was 3.9 people per square mile (1.5/km^{2}). There were 202 housing units at an average density of 6.0/sq mi (2.3/km^{2}). The racial makeup of the township was 100.00% White. Hispanic or Latino of any race were 0.75% of the population.

There were 62 households, out of which 22.6% had children under the age of 18 living with them, 53.2% were married couples living together, 3.2% had a female householder with no husband present, and 38.7% were non-families. 35.5% of all households were made up of individuals, and 12.9% had someone living alone who was 65 years of age or older. The average household size was 2.15 and the average family size was 2.74.

In the township the population was spread out, with 19.5% under the age of 18, 4.5% from 18 to 24, 24.1% from 25 to 44, 36.8% from 45 to 64, and 15.0% who were 65 years of age or older. The median age was 46 years. For every 100 females, there were 125.4 males. For every 100 females age 18 and over, there were 118.4 males.

The median income for a household in the township was $36,250, and the median income for a family was $53,750. Males had a median income of $44,375 versus $26,667 for females. The per capita income for the township was $20,869. There were 5.6% of families and 14.2% of the population living below the poverty line, including 31.3% of under eighteens and none of those over 64.

== Forest access ==
Presently the township is part of a conflict regarding state and county plans to establish a "managed" designation for the Cloquet Valley State Forest. Many private citizens, property owners and local and regional groups oppose the "open unless posted closed" policy the county advocates. These groups include the Izaak Walton League of Duluth, Friends of the Cloquet Valley State Forest, the American Association of Foresters, Minnesota Chapter, Fish and Wildlife Alliance, Minnesotans for Responsible Recreation, the Sierra Club, the Audubon Society and many others. Feedback to the DNR was overwhelmingly in favor of "closed unless posted open", but the DNR has chosen to take the most liberal interpretation of the law and push the "open unless posted closed" rule.

The DNR's plan can be found here and contains reference on page

Additionally, a destination trail was opposed by some local residents and the Duluth-based organization Minnesotans for Responsible Recreation. The plan for the 70-mile (110 km) destination trail was revealed by the Duluth News Tribune, and some local residents were alarmed by the prospect of unfettered access in much of the forest coupled with intense advertising that would accompany the trail.
