= Little Knife River (Lake County, Minnesota) =

Coordinates: 47.0296558°N 91.7365649°W

Little Knife River (East)

Location
- Country: United States

Physical characteristics
- Source
  - location: Minnesota

The Little Knife River (East) is a 5.7-mile-long (9.2 km) river in Lake County, Minnesota, United States. It is a tributary of the Knife River, located northwest of the city of Two Harbors. A second Little Knife River flows into the Knife River from the west, through St. Louis County.

== See also ==
- List of rivers of Minnesota
