= Lester River Bridge =

- Lester River Bridge–Bridge No. 5772
- U.S. National Register of Historic Places
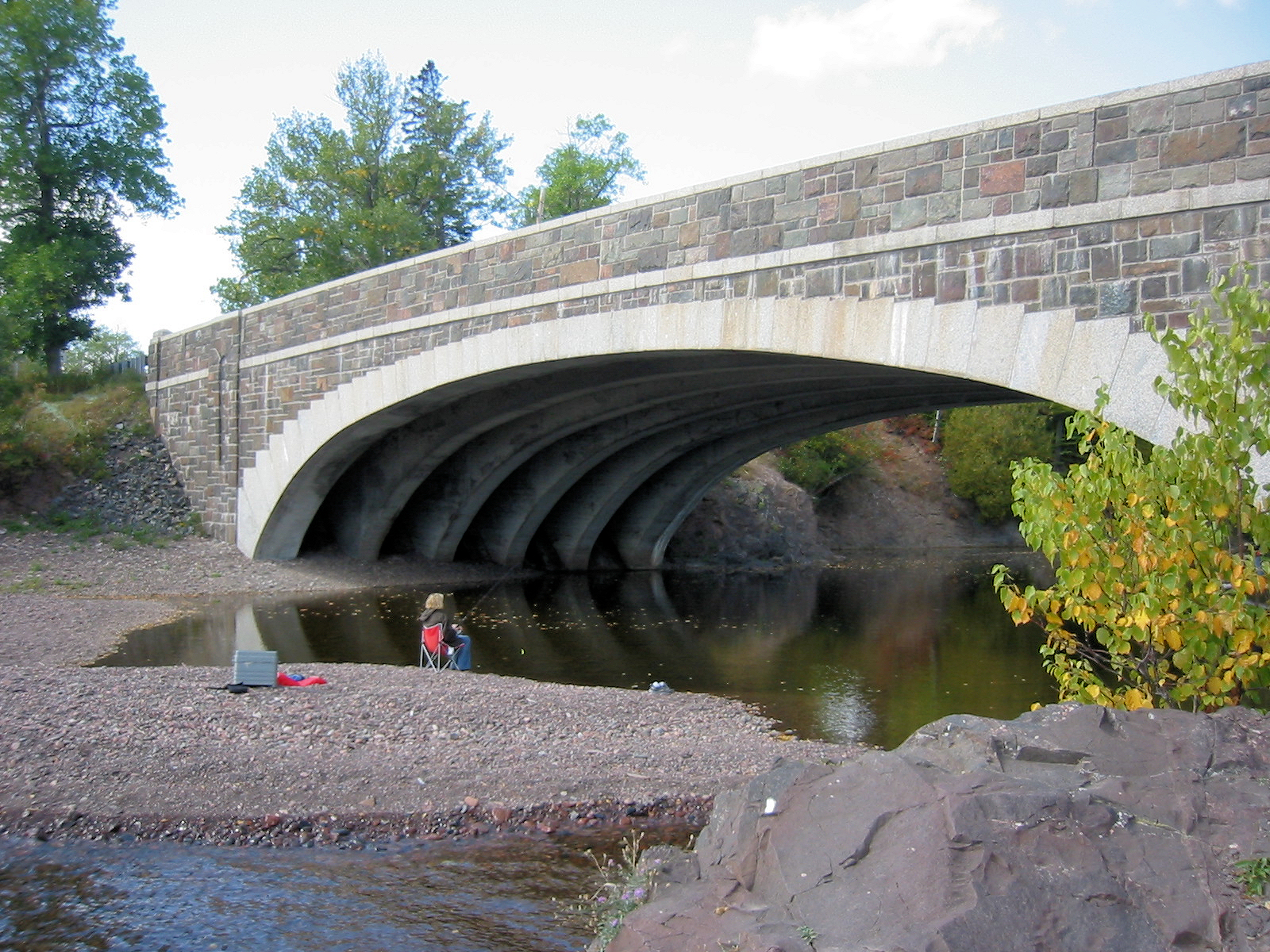
- The Lester River Bridge viewed from the southeast

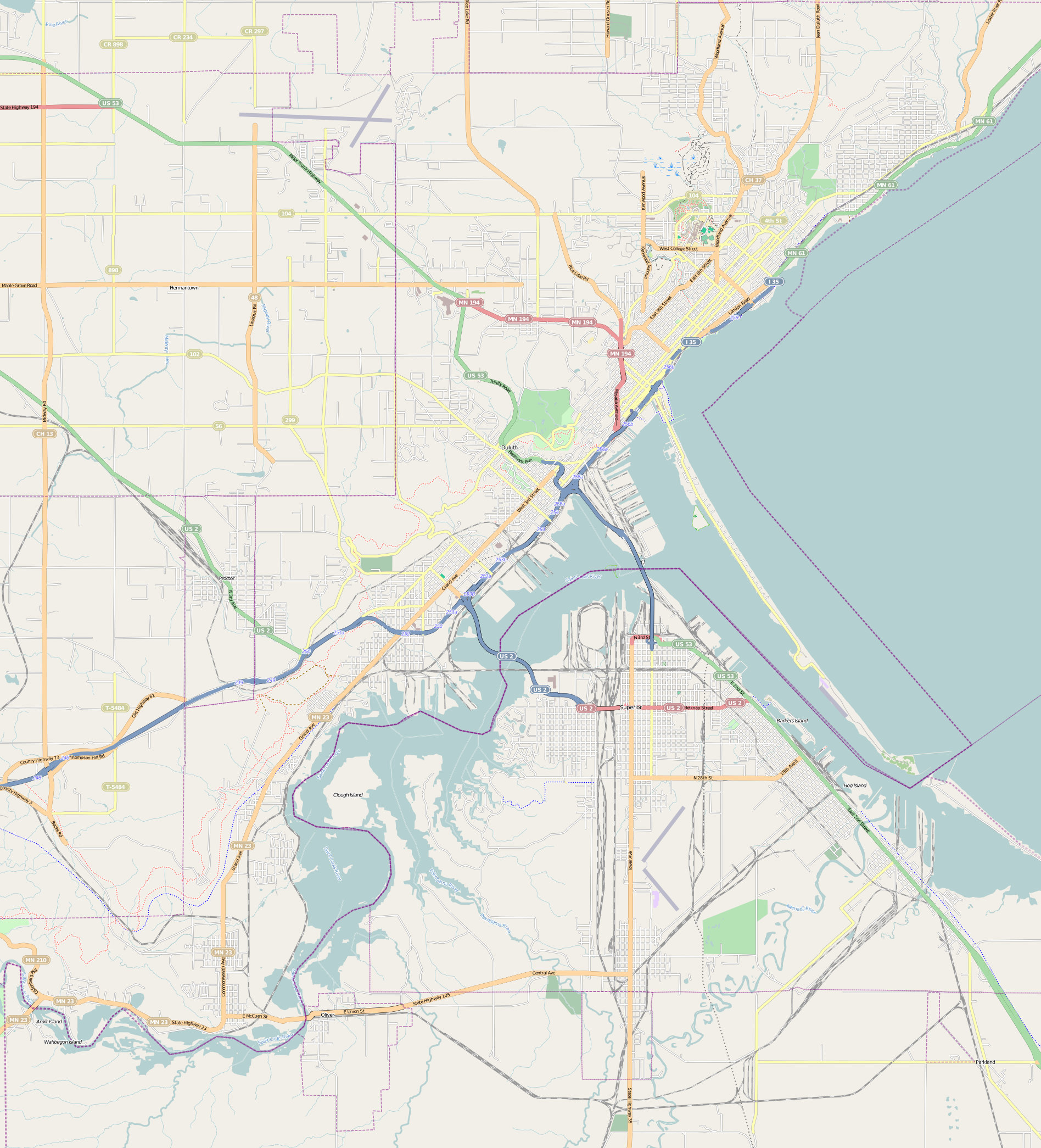
- Location within Duluth Location within Minnesota Location within the United States
- Location: London Road over the Lester River, Duluth, Minnesota
- Coordinates: 46°50′12″N 92°0′22″W
- Area: Less than one acre
- Built: 1924–25
- Built by: Charles Russell McLean
- Architect: Anthony Morell & Arthur R. Nichols (landscape architects), William H. Cruikshank (engineer)
- Architectural style: Filled-spandrel concrete arch
- MPS: Reinforced-Concrete Highway Bridges in Minnesota MPS
- NRHP reference No.: 02000934
- Added to NRHP: September 6, 2002

The Lester River Bridge (Bridge 5772) is a historic road bridge carrying Minnesota State Highway 61 (London Road) over the Lester River in Duluth, Minnesota, United States. Structurally it is a reinforced concrete arch bridge with decorative stone facing. It was built from 1924 to 1925. In 2002 the bridge was listed as Lester River Bridge–Bridge No. 5772 on the National Register of Historic Places for its state-level significance in the themes of architecture, engineering, and transportation. It was nominated for its Neoclassical architecture, impressive 103.5-foot (31.5 m) span, and association with the opening of the highway along the scenic North Shore of Lake Superior.

== See also ==
- List of bridges on the National Register of Historic Places in Minnesota
- National Register of Historic Places listings in St. Louis County, Minnesota
