= French River (Minnesota) =

Coordinates: 46.8991032°N 91.8921277°W

Location
- Country: United States

Physical characteristics
- Source
  - location: Minnesota

The French River is a 13-mile-long (21 km) river in Saint Louis County, Minnesota, United States, flowing into Lake Superior at the unincorporated community of French River in Duluth Township. The river also flows through Normanna and Lakewood townships.

== See also ==
- List of rivers of Minnesota
