= Larsmont, Minnesota =

Unincorporated community in Minnesota, United States

- Unincorporated community
- Location within Minnesota Location within the United States
- Coordinates: 46°58′45″N 91°44′45″W
- Country: United States
- State: Minnesota
- County: Lake
- Elevation: 666 ft (203 m)

Population
  - Total: 110
- Time zone: UTC-6 (Central (CST))
  - Summer (DST): UTC-5 (CDT)
- ZIP code: 55616
- Area code: 218
- GNIS feature ID: 656953

Larsmont is an unincorporated community in Lake County, Minnesota, United States, on the North Shore of Lake Superior. It is five miles southwest of Two Harbors on the North Shore Scenic Drive (County 61).

Larsmont is within Lake No. 2 Unorganized Territory of Lake County.

== History ==
Larsmont was first settled in 1888 at Milepost 22 on the Duluth and Iron Range Railroad. It was founded by Finland-Swedish immigrants from Larsmo, Ostrobothnia. They originally requested to name the town Larsmo, but officials did not approve and instead chose the name Larsmont. Later residents came from Munsala in Nykarleby, Finland.

On October 12, 1918, part of the great 1918 Cloquet Fire burned down the hillside as far as the railroad tracks. People who lived on the hillside took refuge in homes along the lakeshore. Six cars of Home Guards came from Two Harbors to help fight the fire.

A post office was established in 1916. In 1963, Larsmont was assigned ZIP code 55610. The ZIP code was retired on November 1, 1978, and the post office closed. Larsmont is now covered by ZIP code 55616, based in Two Harbors.
