= Little Knife River (St. Louis County, Minnesota) =

Coordinates: 46.9452135°N 91.8090685°W

Little Knife River (West)

Location
- Country: United States

Physical characteristics
- Source
  - location: Minnesota

The Little Knife River (West) is a 7.4-mile-long (11.9 km) river in St. Louis County, Minnesota, United States. It is a tributary of the Knife River. A second Little Knife River flows into the Knife River from the east, in Lake County.

== See also ==
- List of rivers of Minnesota
