= Lester River Fish Hatchery =

- Alternative names: Limnological Research Station
- US Fisheries Station, Duluth
- U.S. National Register of Historic Places
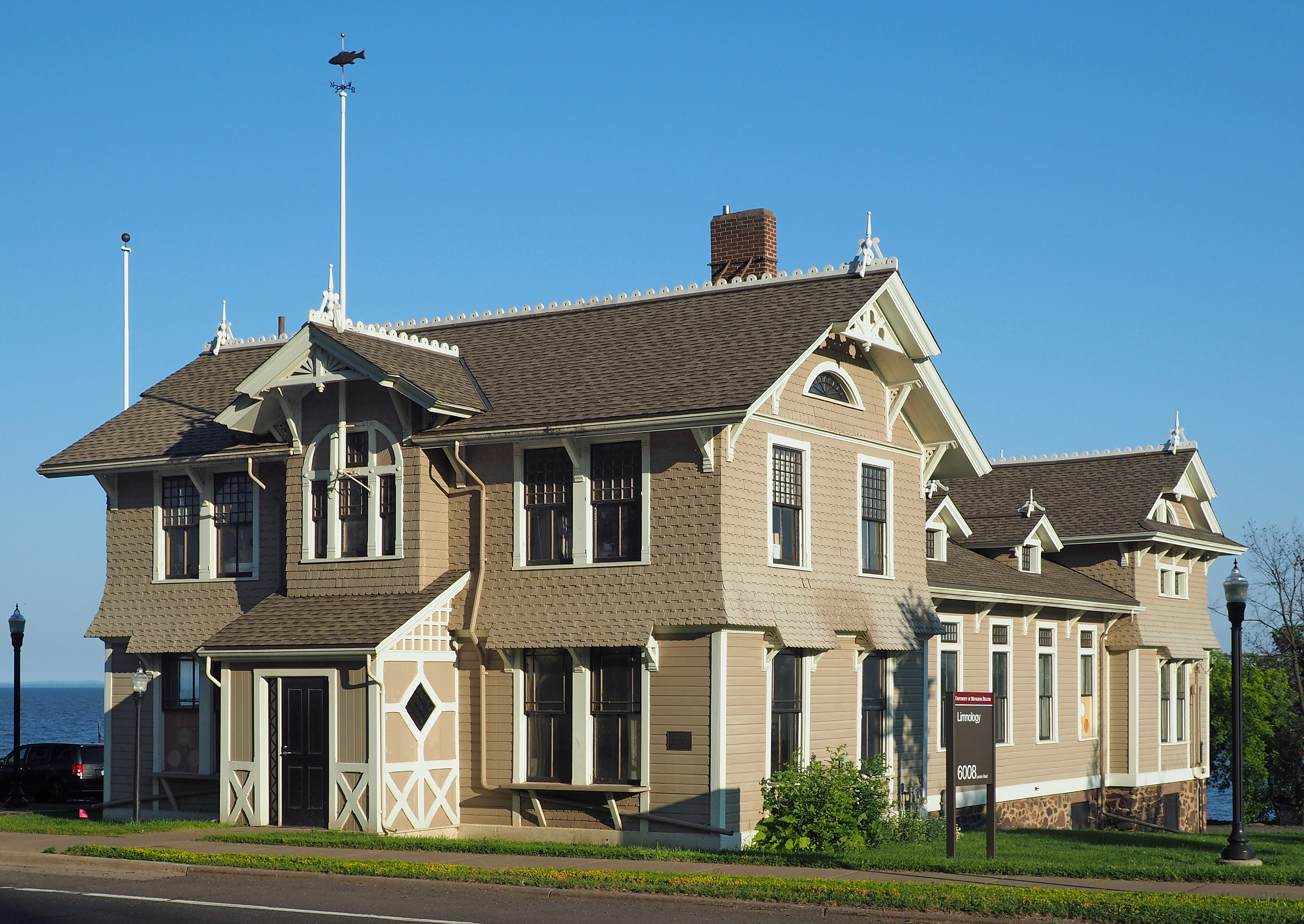
- The lab building at the Lester River Fish Hatchery

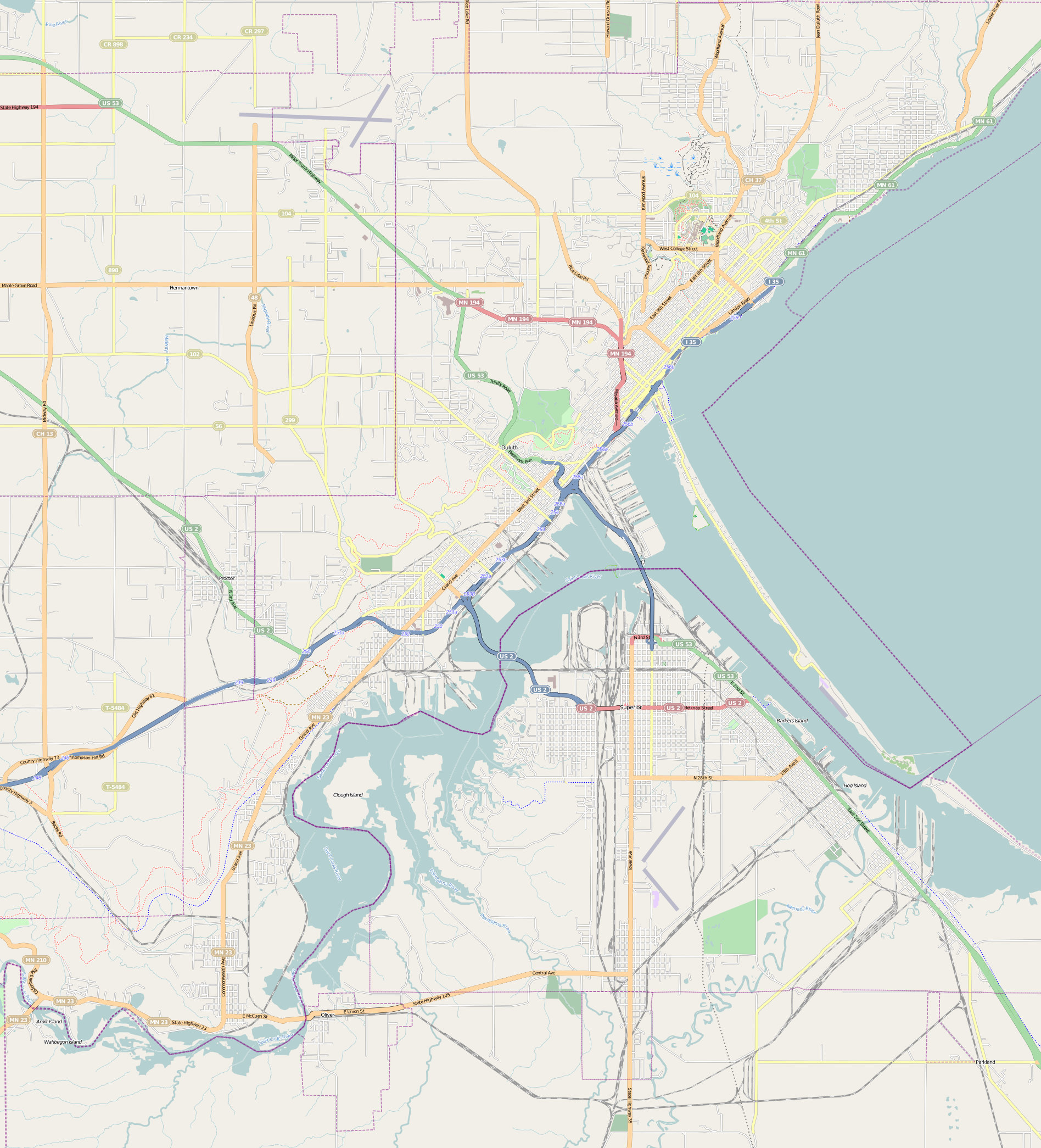
- Location within Duluth Location within Minnesota Location within the United States
- Location: 6008 London Road, Duluth, Minnesota
- Coordinates: 46°50′10″N 92°0′26″W
- Area: Less than 3 acres (1.2 ha)
- Built: 1888
- Architect: Robert Ormsby Sweeney
- Architectural style: Stick/Shingle Style
- NRHP reference No.: 78003126
- Added to NRHP: November 28, 1978

The Lester River Fish Hatchery is a former federal fish hatchery in Duluth, Minnesota, United States. It was built at the mouth of the Lester River in the 1880s to propagate fish for the Lake Superior commercial fishery. The hatchery closed in 1946 and the facility was sold to the University of Minnesota Duluth, which used it as its Limnological Research Station. The surviving four buildings are noted for their Stick and Shingle Style architecture, forming a distinctive landmark to local residents as well as tourists heading to Superior's North Shore.

In 1978 the hatchery complex was listed on the National Register of Historic Places under the name US Fisheries Station, Duluth, for its state-level significance in the themes of architecture and education. It was nominated for exemplifying the Stick and Shingle styles popular in Minnesota during the 1880s and for its long association with studies conducted on Lake Superior.

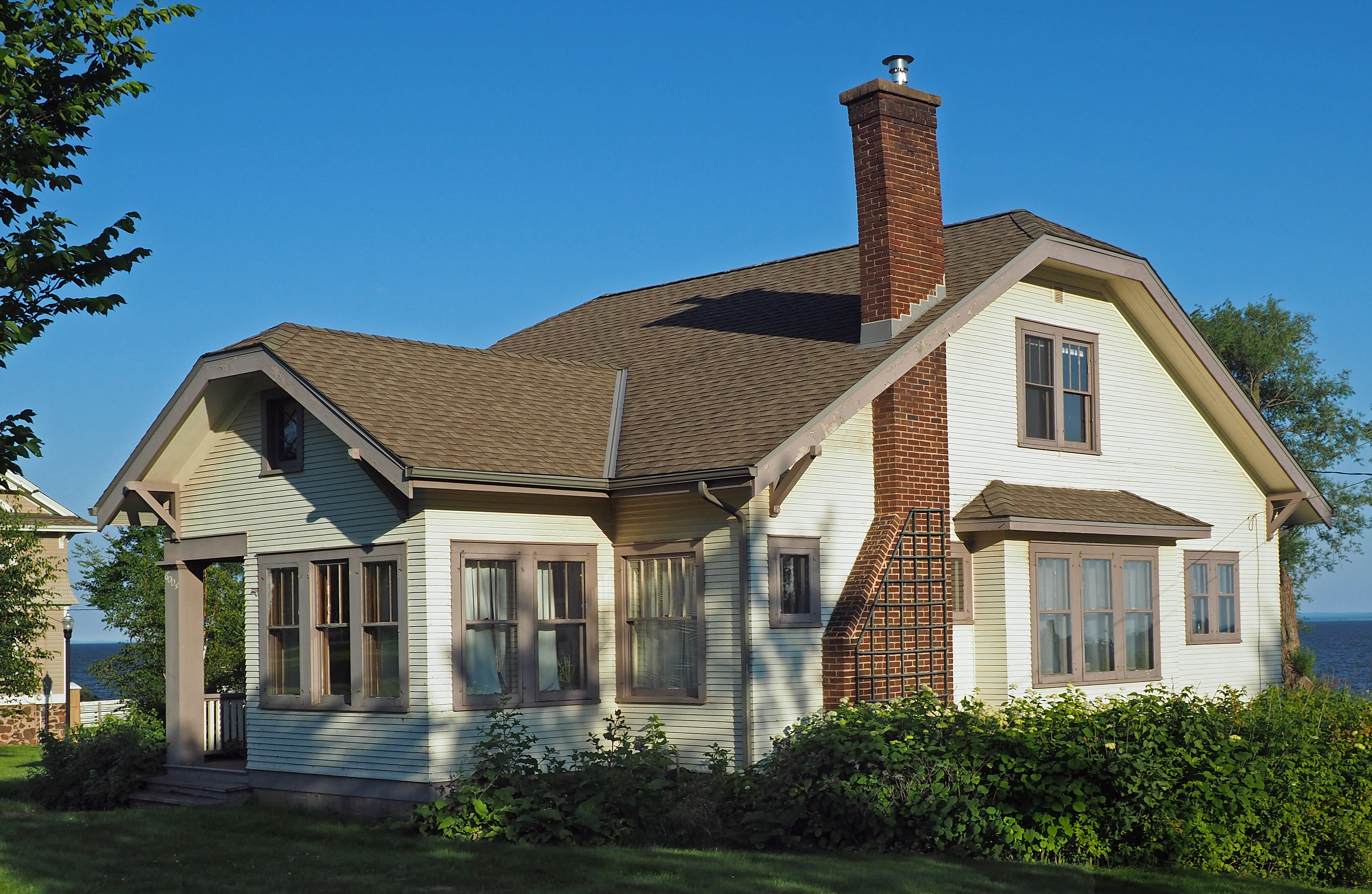
The cottage

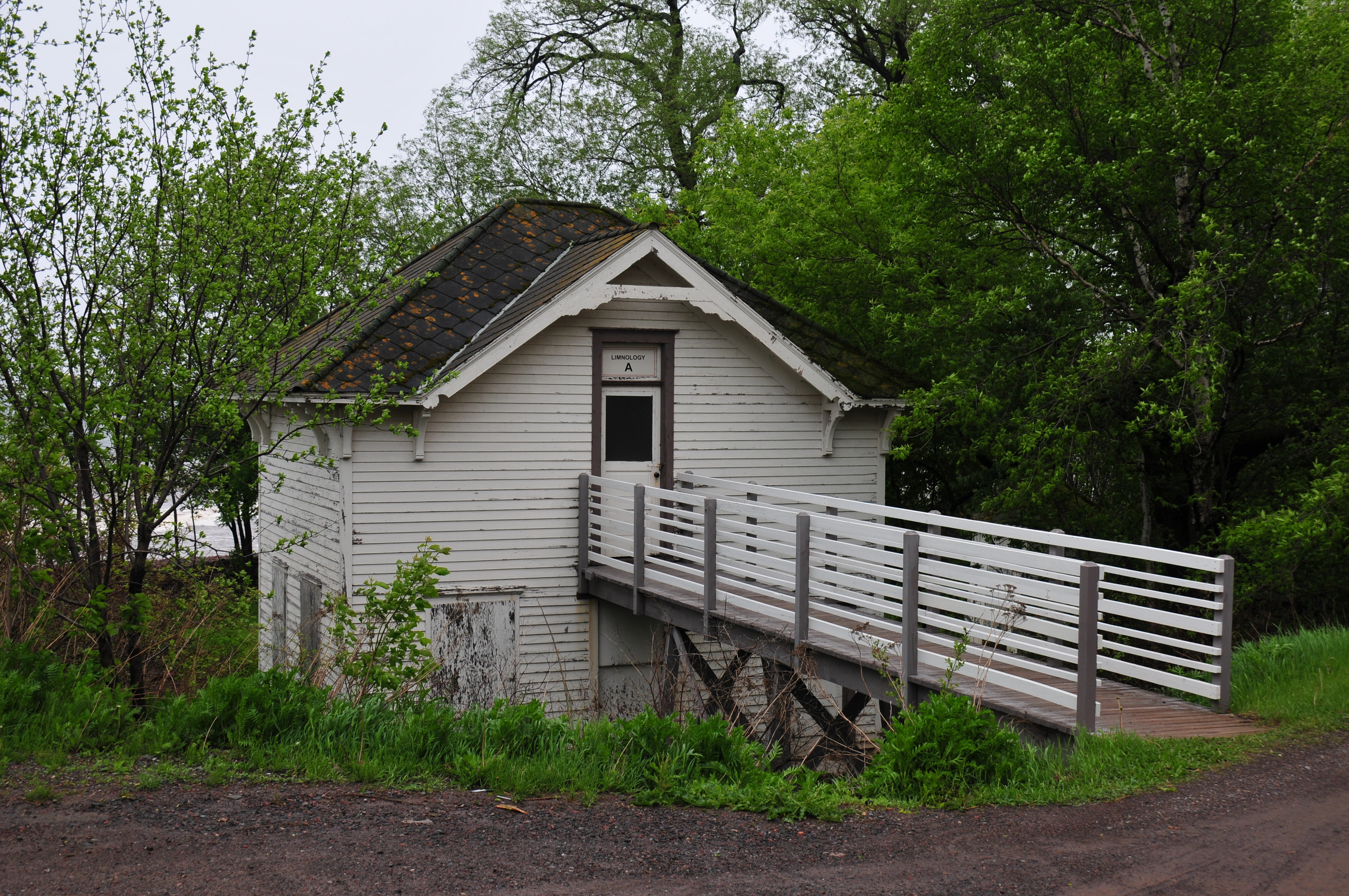
The carriage barn

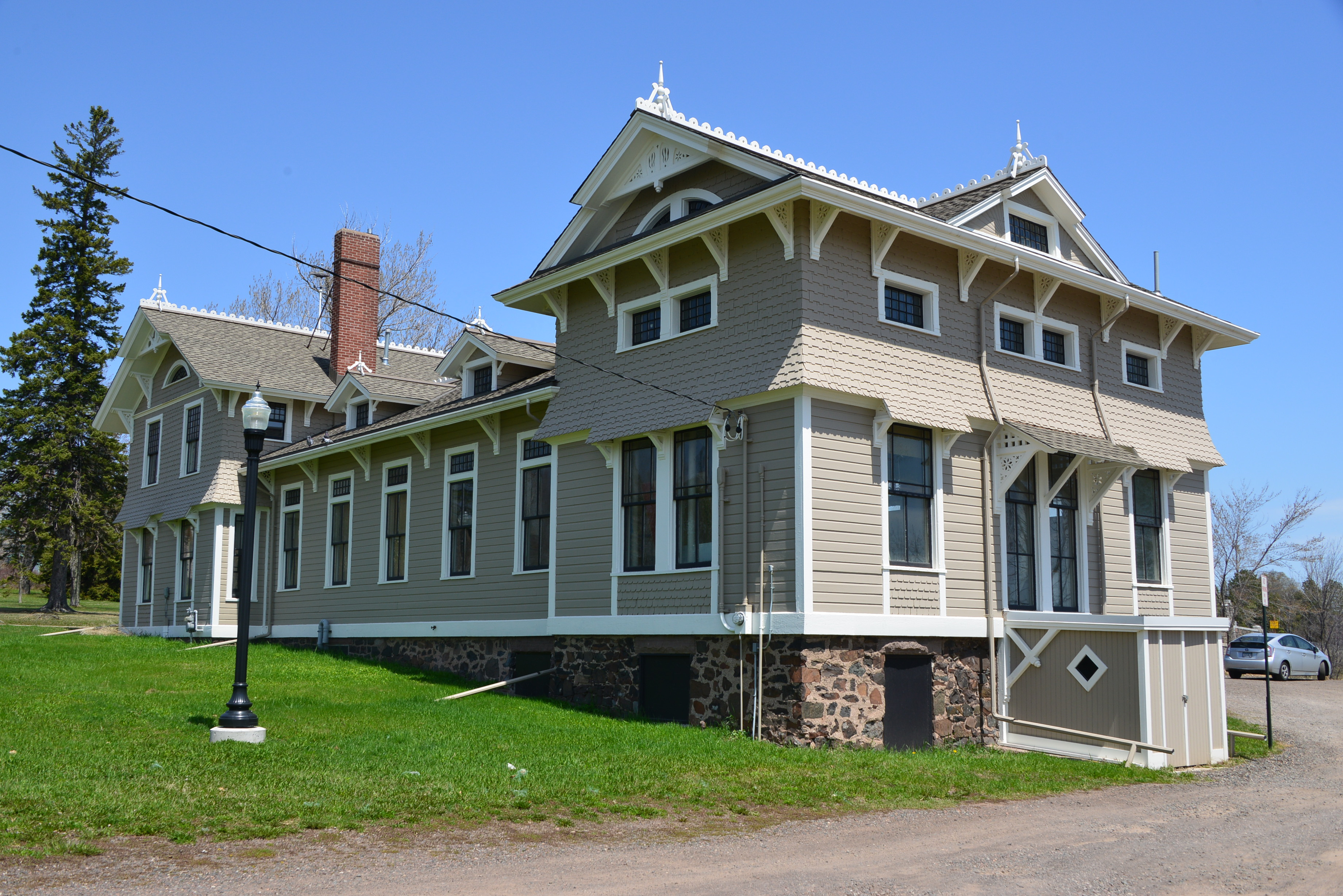
The rear of the laboratory

== See also ==
- National Register of Historic Places listings in St. Louis County, Minnesota
