= French River, Minnesota =

French River
- Unincorporated community
- Location within Minnesota
- Coordinates: 46°53′53″N 91°53′50″W
- Country: United States
- State: Minnesota
- County: Saint Louis
- Township: Duluth Township
- Elevation: 650 ft (200 m)

Population
  - Total: 110
- Time zone: UTC-6 (Central (CST))
  - Summer (DST): UTC-5 (CDT)
- ZIP code: 55804
- Area code: 218
- GNIS feature ID: 661327

French River is an unincorporated community in Duluth Township, Saint Louis County, Minnesota, United States; located on the North Shore of Lake Superior.

The community is located 13 miles northeast of the city of Duluth, at the junction of North Shore Scenic Drive (County 61) and Ryan Road (County Road 50).

== History ==
French River had also been known by the name Clifton during the early settlement years. Clifton, the first townsite surveyed in the United States section of the North Shore, was platted west of the mouth of the French River in 1855. The river was known to early explorers as Riviere des Français and to the Ojibwe as Angwassago zibi, meaning 'Floodwood River'. Rumors of nearby copper deposits resulted in widespread prospecting and townsite planning in the 1850s. Like many of the projected towns, Clifton never developed. From 1864 to 1866, the French River Mining Company and the North Shore Mining Company dug several exploratory shafts, but failed to locate profitable copper deposits. Extensive lumbering operations were carried on in the vicinity during the 1880s.
