= Marion Lake, Minnesota =

Unorganized territory of St. Louis County, Minnesota, United States

Coordinates: 47.156°N 91.989°W

Marion Lake is an unorganized territory in Saint Louis County, Minnesota, United States. The population was 376 at the 2020 census.

Pequaywan Lake Road (Saint Louis County Road 44) serves as a main route in the area.

Nearby places include North Star Township and Pequaywan Township.

== Geography ==
According to the United States Census Bureau, the unorganized territory has a total area of about 1.9 square miles (4.92km^{2})

== Demographics ==
At the 2020 census, there were 376 people and 109 housing units. The population density was 202 people per square mile. Of the 109 households. 89% were married couples living together, 0% had a female householder with no husband present or a male householder with no female present, and 11% were non-families. The average household size and the average family size was 3.5 people. 82% of the population is White, 4% are Asian, and 14% are 2+ races.

The age distribution was 43% under the age of 18, 38% from 18 to 64, and 19% 65 or older. The median age was 33.4 years. The territory's population is 53% male to 37% female.

The median household income was $111,750 and the per capita income was $25,227. There was also 0% of the population living below the poverty line.

The educational attainment of the territory was that 92.8% of people had graduated from high school with 37.1% going on to get a Bachelor's degree or higher. 100% of children aged 5–17 and 93% of adults over the age of 18 spoke English only at home and 7% spoke an Asian or Islander language at home.
