= Palmers, Minnesota =

Palmers
- Unincorporated community
- Location within Minnesota Location within the United States
- Coordinates: 46°55′29″N 91°51′03″W
- Country: United States
- State: Minnesota
- County: Saint Louis
- Township: Duluth Township
- Elevation: 659 ft (201 m)

Population
  - Total: 20
- Time zone: UTC-6 (Central (CST))
  - Summer (DST): UTC-5 (CDT)
- ZIP code: 55804
- Area code: 218
- GNIS feature ID: 662128

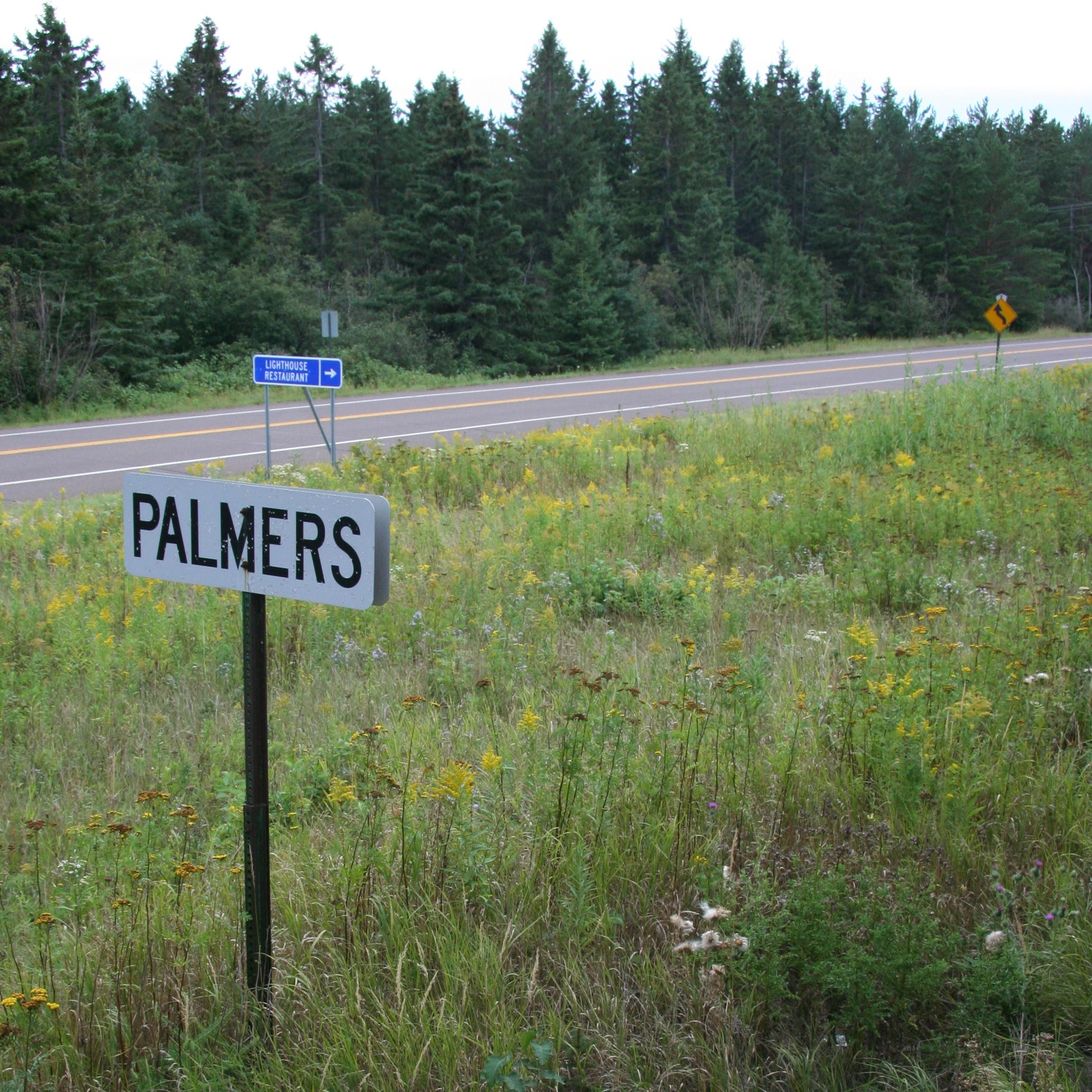
Palmers railroad sign

Palmers is an unincorporated community in Duluth Township, Saint Louis County, Minnesota, United States; located on the North Shore of Lake Superior.

The community is located 16 miles (26 km) northeast of the city of Duluth, at the junction of North Shore Scenic Drive (County 61) and Homestead Road (County Road 42). Stoney Point is in the area.

The boundary line between Saint Louis and Lake counties is nearby.
