= Talmadge River =

Coordinates: 46°53′01″N 91°54′53″W

Location
- Country: United States

Physical characteristics
- Source
  - location: Minnesota

The Talmadge River is a 6.0-mile-long (9.7 km) river in southern St. Louis County, Minnesota. It flows through Lakewood Township into Lake Superior, just north of the city of Duluth.

Talmadge River is named after Josiah Talmadge, a pioneer who settled near the river in 1856.

== See also ==
- List of rivers of Minnesota
