= Hawk Ridge, Duluth =

Hawk watching sanctuary in Minnesota

Hawk Ridge
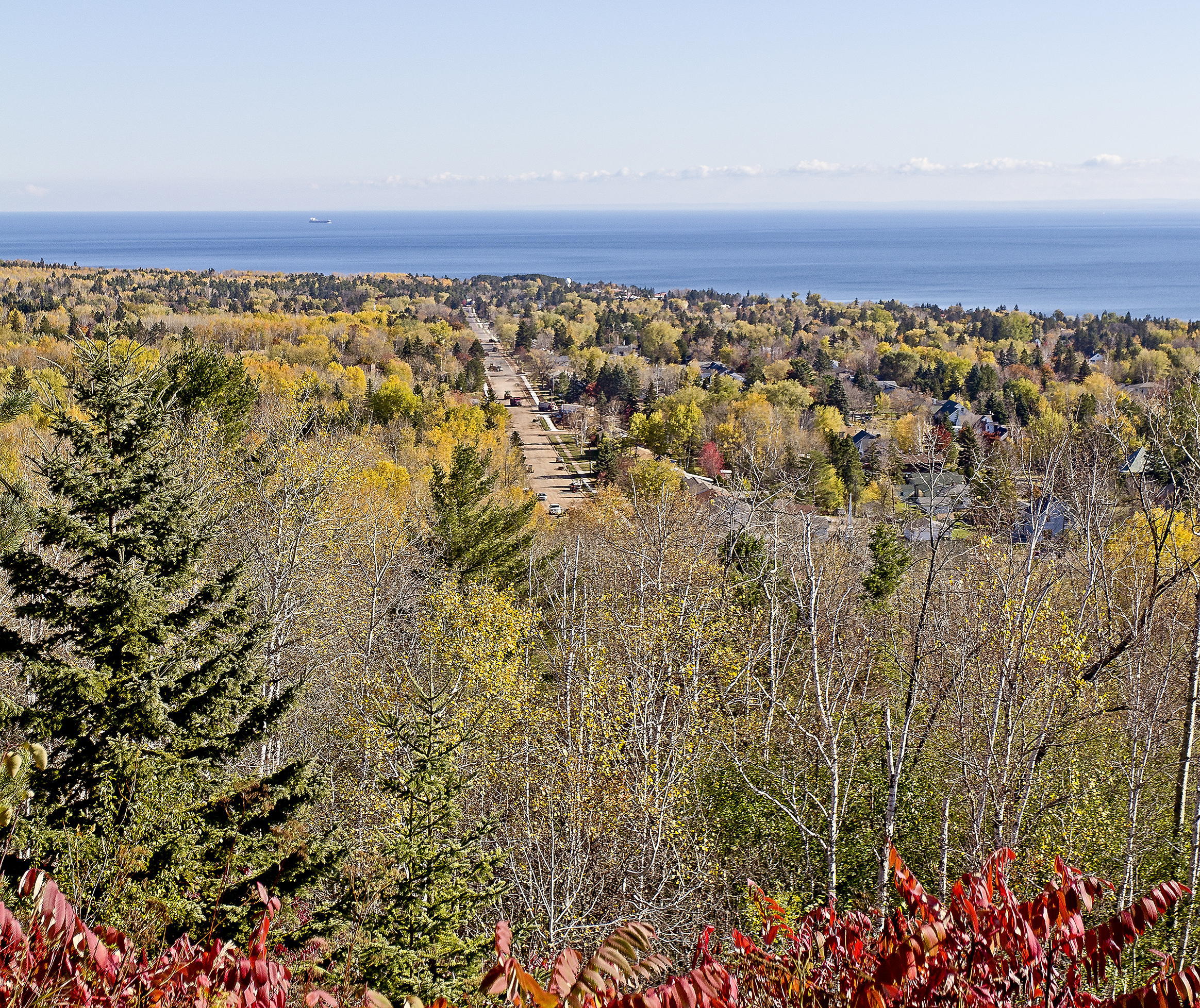
- View from Hawk Ridge
- Interactive map of Hawk Ridge
- Nearest city: Duluth
- Coordinates: 46°50′51″N 92°01′52″W
- Created: 1972
- Owner: City of Duluth
- Administrator: Hawk Ridge Bird Observatory

Hawk Ridge is a nature reserve and bird observatory renowned for its autumnal raptor migrations. The Audubon Society describes Hawk Ridge as "one of the premier sites in North America". P. B. Hofslund, one of the first ornithologists to conduct research there, pronounced it "one of the great hawk flyways of the world". Twenty-thousand birdwatchers visit Hawk Ridge each year to view the migration. It is an important site for ornithological research.

== History ==
The area was originally frequented by hunters. "Hawk hill", as it was known, was a favorite location for shooting birds of prey. However, because the site was within the city limits of Duluth, the Duluth Bird Club (which later became the Duluth chapter of the Audubon Society) succeeded in having an ordinance enforced there prohibiting the discharge of firearms within city limits.

Hofslund and the Duluth Bird Club helped to popularize the location as a site for bird watching. In 1972 the Duluth Audubon Society received a loan from the Nature Conservancy to purchase land at the location. The Duluth Audubon Society then donated the funds to the city of Duluth's parks and recreation department which purchased 135 acres at the highest part of the ridge. This land and an additional 200 acres became the Hawk Ridge Nature Reserve. Duluth Audubon and the city of Duluth created a nonprofit trust to manage the reserve, the Hawk Ridge Bird Observatory.

== Geography ==
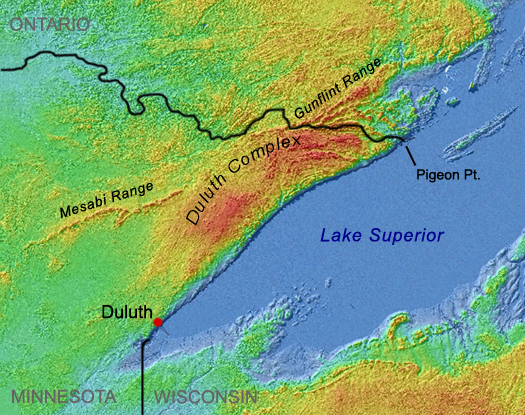
The Duluth Complex and Lake Superior. Hawk Ridge's location at the southwestern end of both create the unique conditions for raptor spotting.

Lake Superior is a natural barrier for migratory birds of prey coming south from Canada. Rather than cross the lake, birds of prey follow the coast south. Between the bluffs of the Duluth Complex on one side and the coastline on the other, the raptors are funneled south until close to Duluth. Here, at Hawk Ridge, the concentration of migratory birds crosses the ridge and continue their migration.

== Ornithological research ==
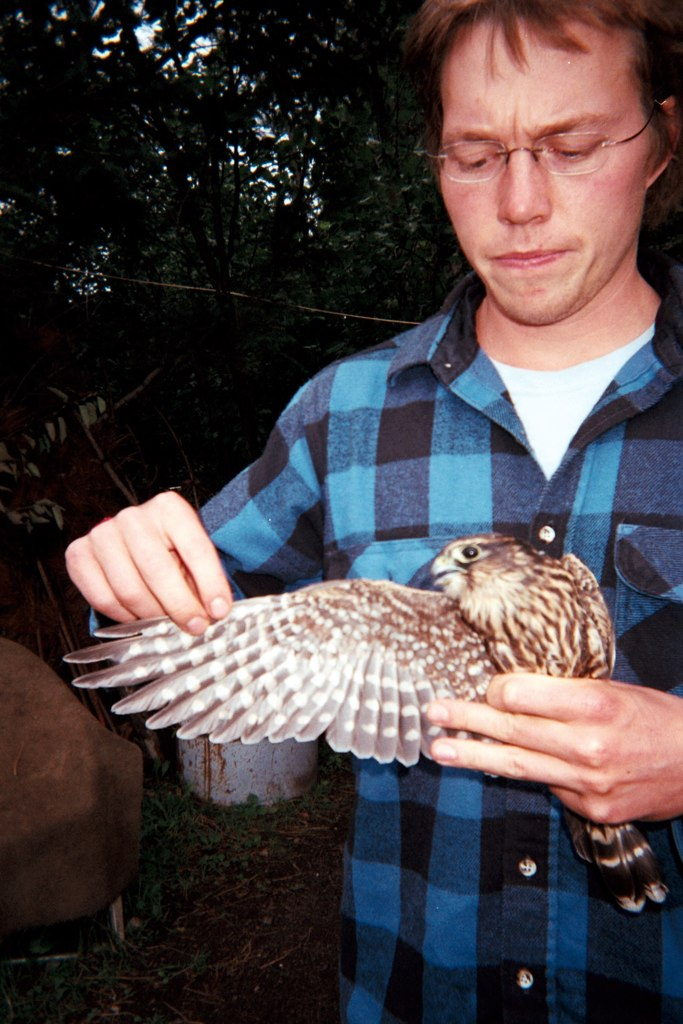
A merlin at Hawk Ridge

The concentration of migratory raptors makes Hawk Ridge a valuable site for conducting ornithological research. Hofslund and the Duluth Bird Club began annual bird counts in 1951. Banding started in 1972 and has taken place every year since. From 1972 to 2009, researchers and volunteers banded 99,505 raptors; the most numerous raptors banded are sharp-shinned hawks and saw-whet owls. According to ornithologists, the data provided from decades of counts and banding as well as the numbers of birds banded and the variety of species make Hawk Ridge an unrivaled location for the field study of raptors.

== See also ==
- Flyway
