= Lester River =

Coordinates: 46°50′12″N 92°00′22″W

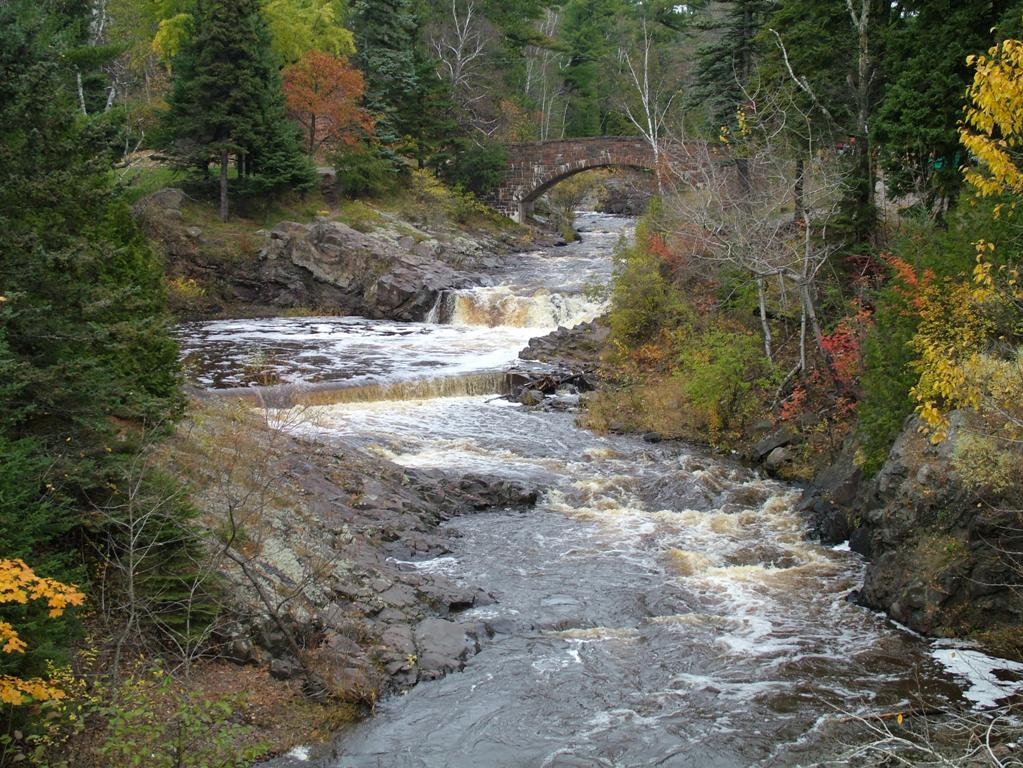
- Native name: Basaabikaa-ziibi (Ojibwe)

Physical characteristics
- Mouth: Lake Superior
- Length: 19.3 m (63 ft)
- Basin size: 58 sq mi (150 sq km)

The Lester River, is a 19.3-mile-long (31.1 km) tributary of Lake Superior, in northeastern Minnesota in the United States. It drains an area of 58 square miles (150 km^{2}).

== Course ==
The Lester River flows for its entire length in southern Saint Louis County. It rises in Gnesen Township and flows generally southeastwardly through the city of Rice Lake and Lakewood Township, turning southward as it nears Lake Superior. It flows into the lake in eastern Duluth.

Lester River is known as Basaabikaa-ziibi in Ojibwe, meaning 'Rocky Canyon River', though Joseph Gilfillan translated its name as 'River that comes through a worn hollow place in the rock', as the river passes through a canyon between Lester Park, where Amity Creek joins the Lester River, and the mouth of the river.

== History ==
Lester River bears the name of an early settler.

=== Historical structures ===
Along the Lester River are two properties listed on the National Register of Historic Places. They are:

- Lester River Bridge (Bridge No. 5772)
- US Fisheries Station, Duluth. Built in 1882, the complex is located at the mouth of the Lester River. It is owned by the University of Minnesota Duluth and temporarily housed the Great Lakes Aquarium administrative offices at the beginning of the aquarium's operations. The complex consists of the Hatchery/Bunk-room Building, Boat House, Pump House, Supervisor's Cabin on the south side of Congdon Boulevard, and a Superintendent's House on the north side of Congdon Boulevard. Between 2011 and 2013, it was given an extensive renovation.

== Gallery ==
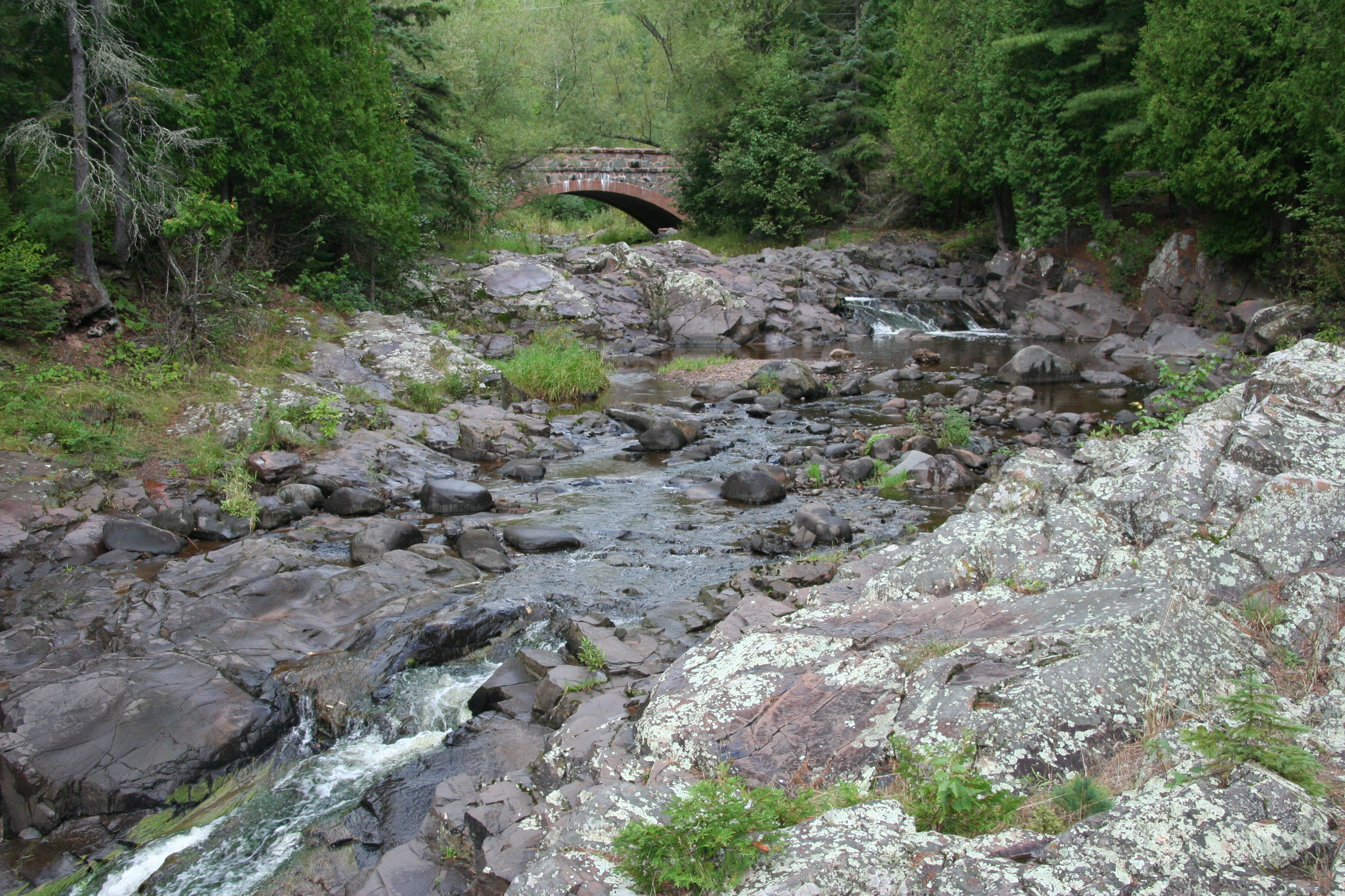
A stream flowing into the Lester River in Duluth

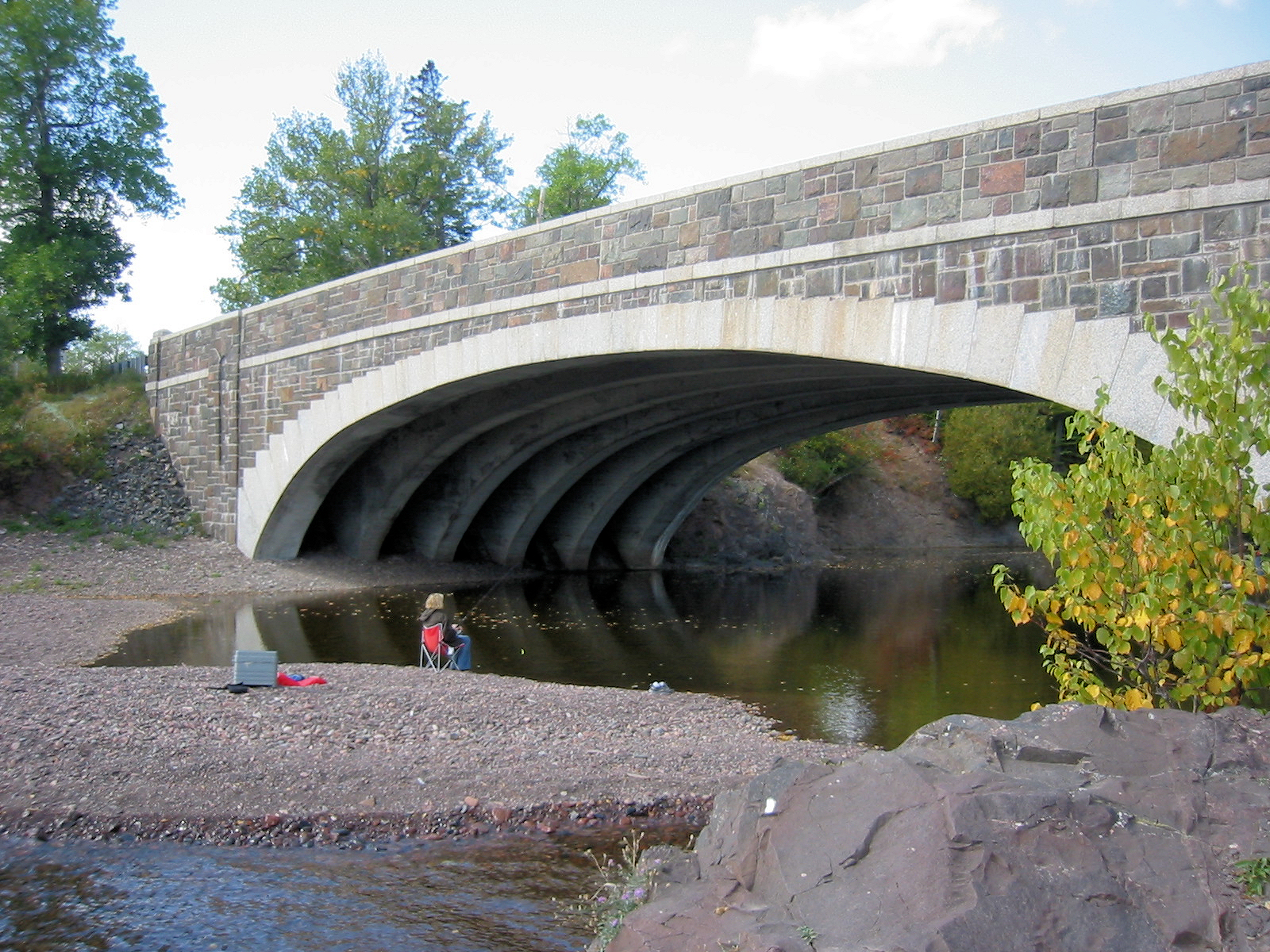
Lester River Bridge near Lake Superior

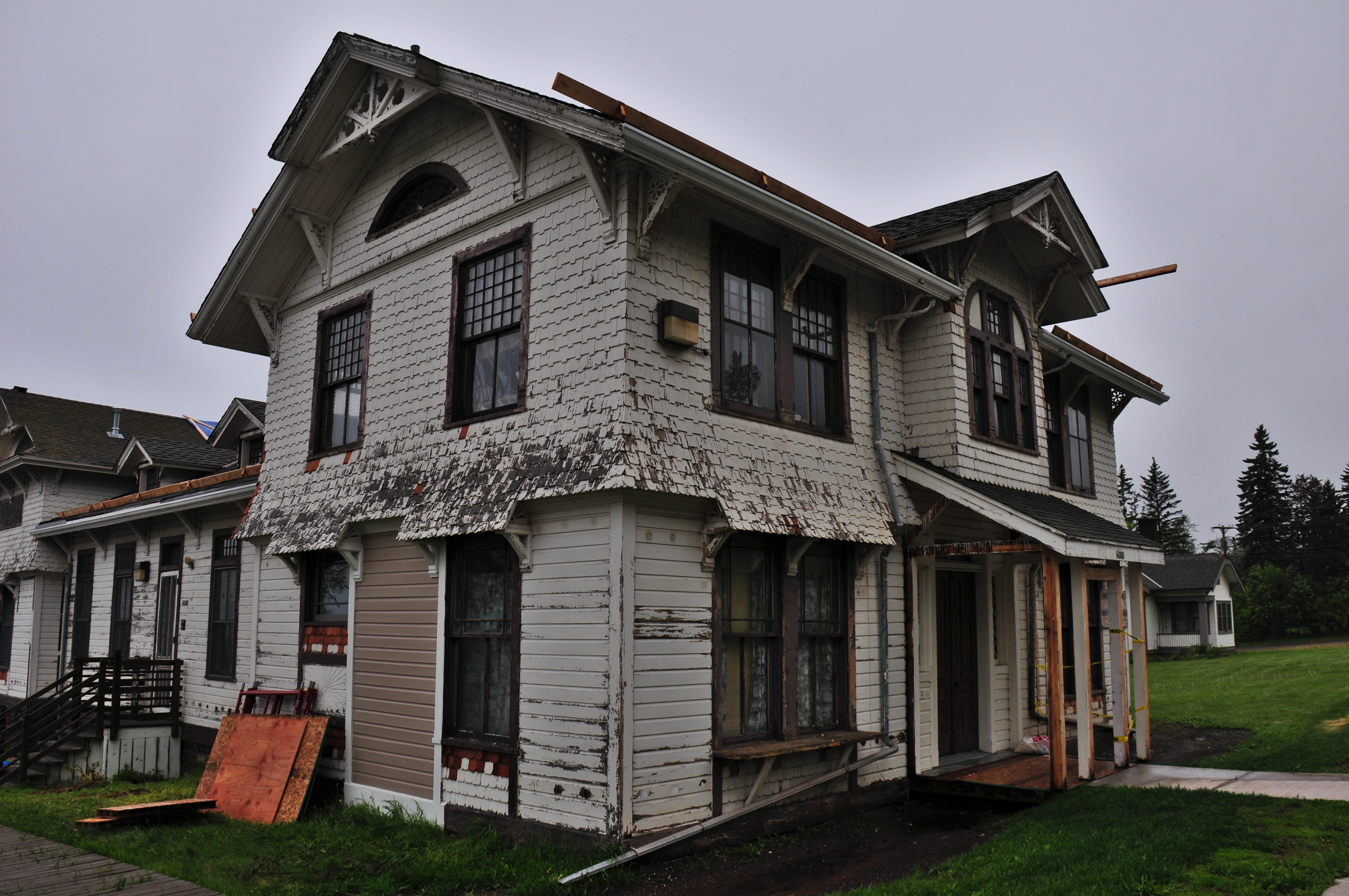
U.S. Fisheries station during renovation in 2012

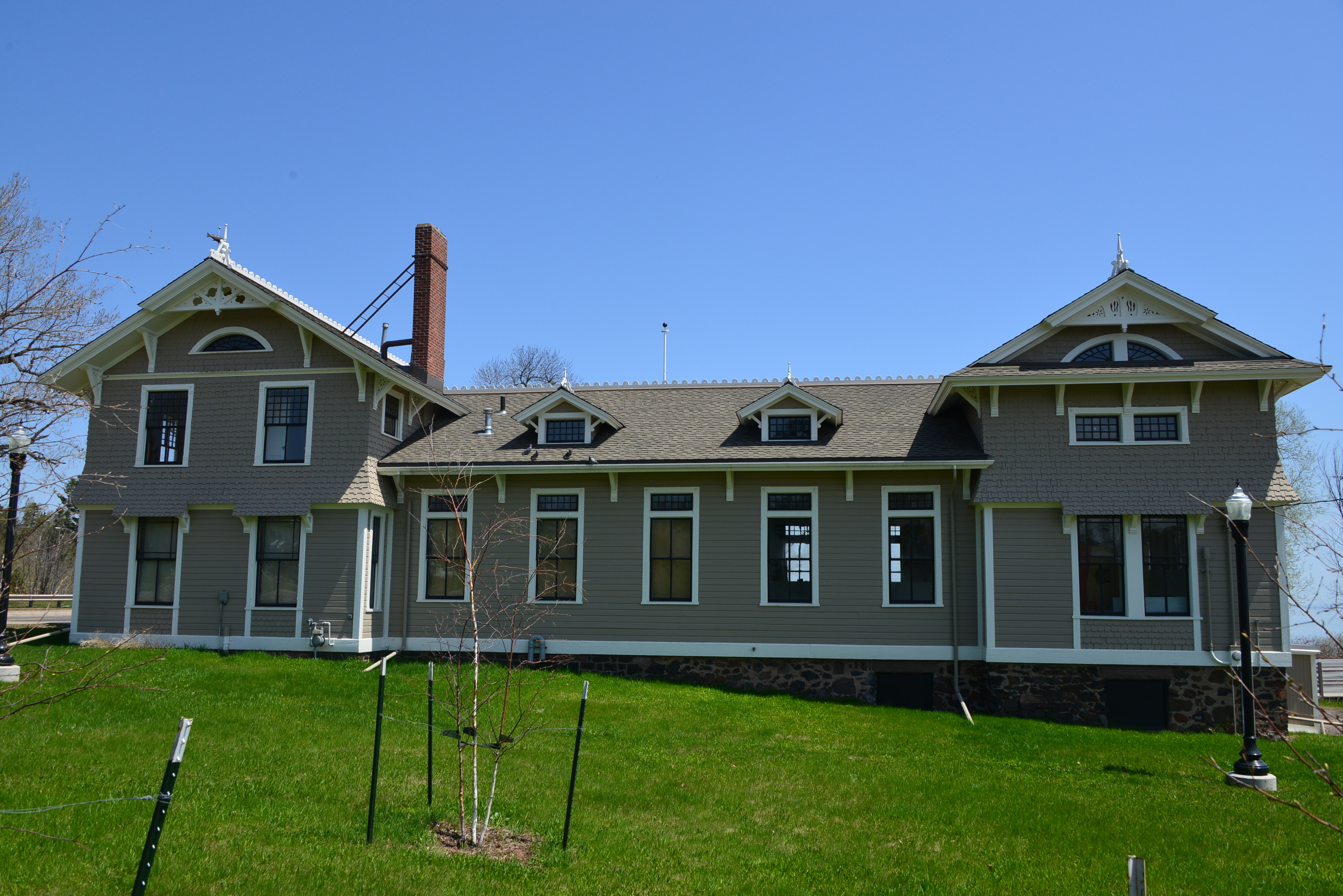
U.S. Fisheries station after renovation

== See also ==
- List of rivers of Minnesota
