= Alden Township, Freeborn County, Minnesota =

Township in Minnesota, United States

Alden Township
- Township
- Location within the state of Minnesota Alden Township (the United States)
- Coordinates: 43°38′5″N 93°34′43″W
- Country: United States
- State: Minnesota
- County: Freeborn

Area
  - Total: 35.4 sq mi (91.6 km^{2})
  - Land: 35.4 sq mi (91.6 km^{2})
  - Water: 0 sq mi (0.0 km^{2})
- Elevation: 1,260 ft (384 m)

Population (2000)
  - Total: 338
  - Density: 9.6/sq mi (3.7/km^{2})
- Time zone: UTC-6 (Central (CST))
  - Summer (DST): UTC-5 (CDT)
- ZIP code: 56009
- Area code: 507
- FIPS code: 27-00856
- GNIS feature ID: 0663408

Alden Township (/ˈɔːldən/ AWL-dən) is a township in Freeborn County, Minnesota, United States. The population was 338 at the 2000 census.

Alden Township was organized in 1866.

== Geography ==
According to the United States Census Bureau, the township has a total area of 35.3 square miles (91 km^{2}), all land.

== Demographics ==
As of the census of 2000, there were 338 people, 125 households, and 106 families residing in the township. The population density was 9.6 people per square mile (3.7/km^{2}). There were 132 housing units at an average density of 3.7/sq mi (1.4/km^{2}). The racial makeup of the township was 98.22% White, 1.78% from other races. Hispanic or Latino of any race were 1.78% of the population.

There were 125 households, out of which 30.4% had children under the age of 18 living with them, 77.6% were married couples living together, 1.6% had a female householder with no husband present, and 15.2% were non-families. 13.6% of all households were made up of individuals, and 3.2% had someone living alone who was 65 years of age or older. The average household size was 2.70 and the average family size was 2.94.

In the township the population was spread out, with 23.1% under the age of 18, 8.6% from 18 to 24, 28.1% from 25 to 44, 27.5% from 45 to 64, and 12.7% who were 65 years of age or older. The median age was 40 years. For every 100 females, there were 119.5 males. For every 100 females age 18 and over, there were 111.4 males.

The median income for a household in the township was $45,417, and the median income for a family was $46,458. Males had a median income of $30,446 versus $19,167 for females. The per capita income for the township was $17,800. None of the families and 1.6% of the population were living below the poverty line, including no under eighteens and none of those over 64.
