= Alden Township, St. Louis County, Minnesota =

Alden Township, Minnesota
- Township
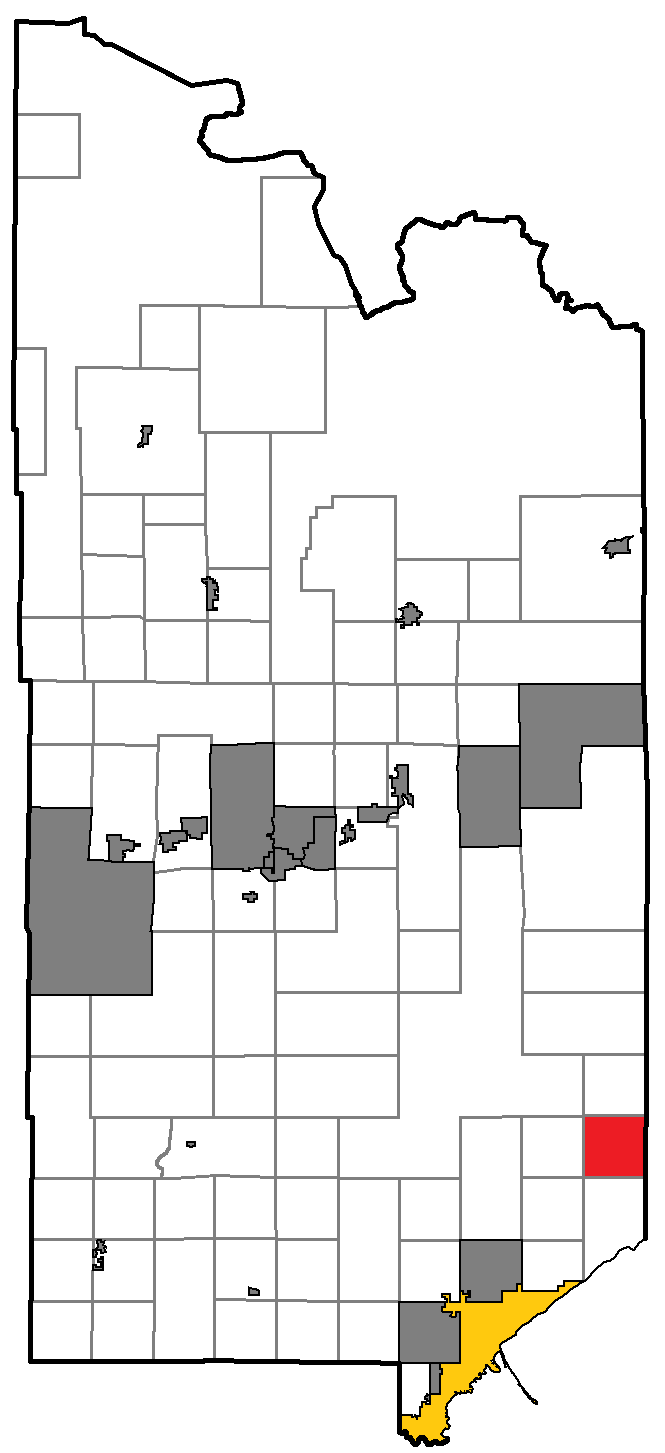
- Location of Alden Township within St. Louis County, Minnesota
- Coordinates: 47°2′9″N 91°50′26″W
- Country: United States
- State: Minnesota
- County: Saint Louis

Area
  - Total: 35.8 sq mi (92.6 km^{2})
  - Land: 35.6 sq mi (92.3 km^{2})
  - Water: 0.12 sq mi (0.3 km^{2})
- Elevation: 1,342 ft (409 m)

Population (2020)
  - Total: 196
  - Density: 5.50/sq mi (2.12/km^{2})
- Time zone: UTC-6 (Central (CST))
  - Summer (DST): UTC-5 (CDT)
- FIPS code: 27-00874
- GNIS feature ID: 0663409

Alden Township (/ˈɔːldən/ AWL-dən) is a township in Saint Louis County, Minnesota, United States. The population was 196 at the 2020 census.

Saint Louis County Road 266 (Fox Farm Road), Laine Road, Rossini Road, and Two Harbors Road pass through the township.

== Geography ==
According to the United States Census Bureau, the township has a total area of 35.8 square miles (93 km^{2}); 35.7 square miles (92 km^{2}) is land and 0.1 square miles (0.26 km^{2}), or 0.28%, is water.

The West Branch of the Knife River and Brophy Creek both flow through Alden Township.

=== Adjacent townships ===
The following are adjacent to Alden Township :

- Duluth Township (south)
- North Star Township (west)
- Pequaywan Township (north)
- Normanna Township (southwest)
- Lake No. 2 Unorganized Territory of Lake County (east)

The northern portion of Alden Township is located within the Cloquet Valley State Forest.

== Demographics ==
At the 2000 census there were 198 people, 71 households, and 58 families living in the township. The population density was 5.6 people per square mile (2.1/km^{2}). There were 92 housing units at an average density of 2.6/sq mi (1.0/km^{2}). The racial makeup of the township was 96.97% White, 2.53% Native American, and 0.51% from two or more races. Hispanic or Latino of any race were 0.51%.

Of the 71 households 46.5% had children under the age of 18 living with them, 73.2% were married couples living together, 4.2% had a female householder with no husband present, and 18.3% were non-families. 16.9% of households were one person and 4.2% were one person aged 65 or older. The average household size was 2.79 and the average family size was 3.12.

The age distribution was 30.3% under the age of 18, 3.5% from 18 to 24, 34.8% from 25 to 44, 23.2% from 45 to 64, and 8.1% 65 or older. The median age was 38 years. For every 100 females, there were 110.6 males. For every 100 females age 18 and over, there were 115.6 males.

The median household income was $48,750 and the median family income was $49,375. Males had a median income of $41,250 versus $28,750 for females. The per capita income for the township was $17,897. About 10.7% of families and 7.5% of the population were below the poverty line, including 3.0% of those under the age of eighteen and none of those sixty five or over.
