= Big Sucker Creek =

Coordinates: 46.9216027°N 91.8479592°W

Location
- Country: United States

Physical characteristics
- Source
  - location: Minnesota

Big Sucker Creek is an 18.2-mile-long (29.3 km) river in St. Louis County, Minnesota, United States. It flows into Lake Superior.

== See also ==
- List of rivers of Minnesota
