= Knife River (Lake Superior) =

- Knife River

Location
- Country: United States
- State: Minnesota
- County: St. Louis, Lake County

Physical characteristics
- Source
  - coordinates: 47.15217°N 91.76090°W
- Mouth
  - location: Knife River, Minnesota, Lake Superior
  - coordinates: 46.9496578°N 91.7787897°W
- Length: 23.9-mile-long (38.5 km)
- Discharge
  - average: 90.3 cu ft/s (2.56 m^{3}/s)

The Knife River is a 23.9-mile-long (38.5 km) river of northern Minnesota which drains a portion of Lake and Saint Louis counties into Lake Superior between Duluth and Two Harbors.

== Name ==
The Knife River's name is an accurate preservation of its native Ojibwe name, Mookomani-Ziibi. Its original name was probably given on account of the long, sharp stones near the mouth of the river.

== Geography ==
The main branch of the Knife River flows 23.9 miles (38.5 km) from source to mouth, flowing parallel to the shoreline from the direction of Two Harbors. It has four or five major tributaries. Its watershed is 84.3 square miles (218 km^{2}), and contains 181.1 miles (291.5 km) of streams. Since data began being collected in 1974, its mean annual daily water discharge has been calculated as 90.3 cubic feet per second (2.56 m^{3}/s). There is concern over the river's water quality due to suspended sediment, and it was placed on the state's impaired waters list in 1998. A 2008 study found that about sixty percent of the sediment came from erosion of the streambanks, and about thirty from erosion of the river's bluffs.

The Knife River's watershed is undeveloped, with 72% forest, 16% wetland, and 6% grassland. 5% is used for agricultural purposes, and the remaining 1% is the unincorporated community of Knife River, Minnesota, located at the river's mouth.

== See also ==
- List of rivers of Minnesota
