= Cedar Valley Township, St. Louis County, Minnesota =

Cedar Valley Township, Minnesota
- Township
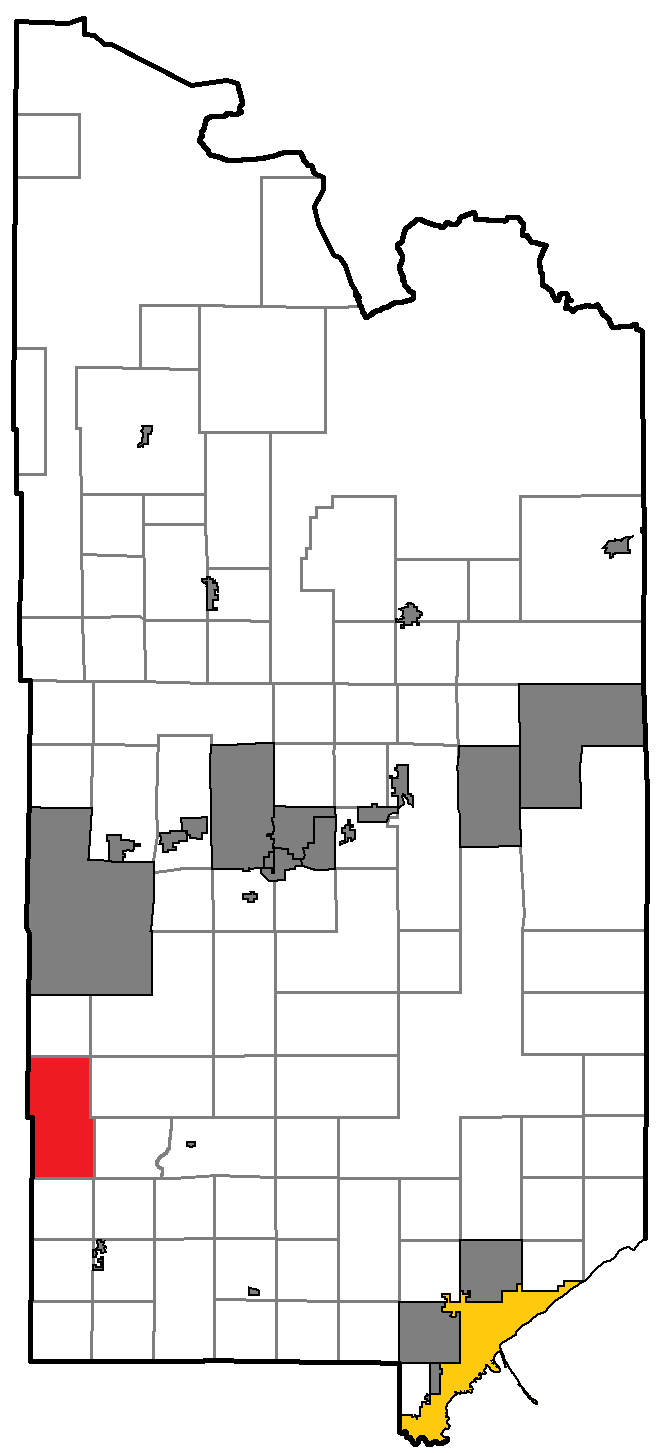
- Location of Cedar Valley Township within St. Louis County, Minnesota
- Coordinates: 47°6′22″N 93°0′8″W
- Country: United States
- State: Minnesota
- County: Saint Louis

Area
  - Total: 69.4 sq mi (179.7 km^{2})
  - Land: 68.5 sq mi (177.5 km^{2})
  - Water: 0.85 sq mi (2.2 km^{2})
- Elevation: 1,273 ft (388 m)

Population (2020)
  - Total: 187
  - Density: 2.73/sq mi (1.05/km^{2})
- Time zone: UTC-6 (Central (CST))
  - Summer (DST): UTC-5 (CDT)
- FIPS code: 27-10540
- GNIS feature ID: 0663770

Cedar Valley Township is a township in Saint Louis County, Minnesota, United States. Cedar Valley Township was named for the white cedar in the valley of the Floodwood River. The population was 187 at the 2020 census.

State Highway 73 (MN 73) serves as a main route in the township.

== Geography ==
According to the United States Census Bureau, the township has a total area of 69.4 square miles (180 km^{2}); 68.5 square miles (177 km^{2}) is land and 0.9 square miles (2.3 km^{2}), or 1.24%, is water.

The Floodwood River flows through Cedar Valley Township. Floodwood Lake is located within the township.

Vaara Creek flows through the east–central portion of the township. Joula Creek briefly enters the southeast part of the township.

=== Adjacent townships and communities ===
The following are adjacent to Cedar Valley Township :

- Van Buren Township (southeast)
- Elmer Township (east)
- Toivola Township (east)
- Lavell Township (northeast)
- Janette Lake Unorganized Territory of Saint Louis County (north)
- The unincorporated community of Silica (north)
- Goodland Township of Itasca County (west and northwest)
- Wawina Township of Itasca County (west)
- Northeast Aitkin Unorganized Territory of Aitkin County (southwest)
- Potshot Lake Unorganized Territory of Saint Louis County (south)

Nearby places include Floodwood, Meadowlands, Silica, Hibbing, Goodland, Swan River, and Wawina.

Highway 73 runs north–south through the middle of Cedar Valley Township. The highway runs south to Floodwood, and north to Silica and Hibbing.

Saint Louis County Highway 133 (CR 133) runs east–west through the southeast part of the township; the roadway continues east to Meadowlands.

CR 133 also runs through the southwest portion of the township on a separate segment of CR 133 known as Wawina Road. CR 133 becomes Itasca County Road 25 at the Saint Louis–Itasca county line, and continues west to Wawina.

County Road 18 and County Road 184 (Floodwood River Road) both pass through the northwest part of Cedar Valley Township. County 18 continues west to the Saint Louis–Itasca county line, becomes Itasca County Road 20, the roadway continues west to Goodland.

The boundary line between Saint Louis, Itasca, and Aitkin counties is located at the southwest corner of Cedar Valley Township.

== Demographics ==
As of the census of 2000, there were 232 people, 79 households, and 68 families residing in the township. The population density was 3.4 inhabitants per square mile (1.3/km^{2}). There were 107 housing units at an average density of 1.6 per square mile (0.62/km^{2}). The racial makeup of the township was 97.84% White, 0.86% Native American, 0.43% Asian, and 0.86% from two or more races. Hispanic or Latino of any race were 0.43% of the population.

There were 79 households, out of which 39.2% had children under the age of 18 living with them, 81.0% were married couples living together, 3.8% had a female householder with no husband present, and 12.7% were non-families. 10.1% of all households were made up of individuals, and 3.8% had someone living alone who was 65 years of age or older. The average household size was 2.91 and the average family size was 3.14.

In the township the population was spread out, with 30.6% under the age of 18, 3.0% from 18 to 24, 28.0% from 25 to 44, 25.4% from 45 to 64, and 12.9% who were 65 years of age or older. The median age was 40 years. For every 100 females, there were 112.8 males. For every 100 females age 18 and over, there were 111.8 males.

The median income for a household in the township was $42,143, and the median income for a family was $42,321. Males had a median income of $43,750 versus $26,250 for females. The per capita income for the township was $16,569. About 5.2% of families and 10.1% of the population were below the poverty line, including 20.9% of those under the age of eighteen and 3.3% of those 65 or over.
