= Cotton Township, St. Louis County, Minnesota =

Cotton Township, Minnesota
- Township
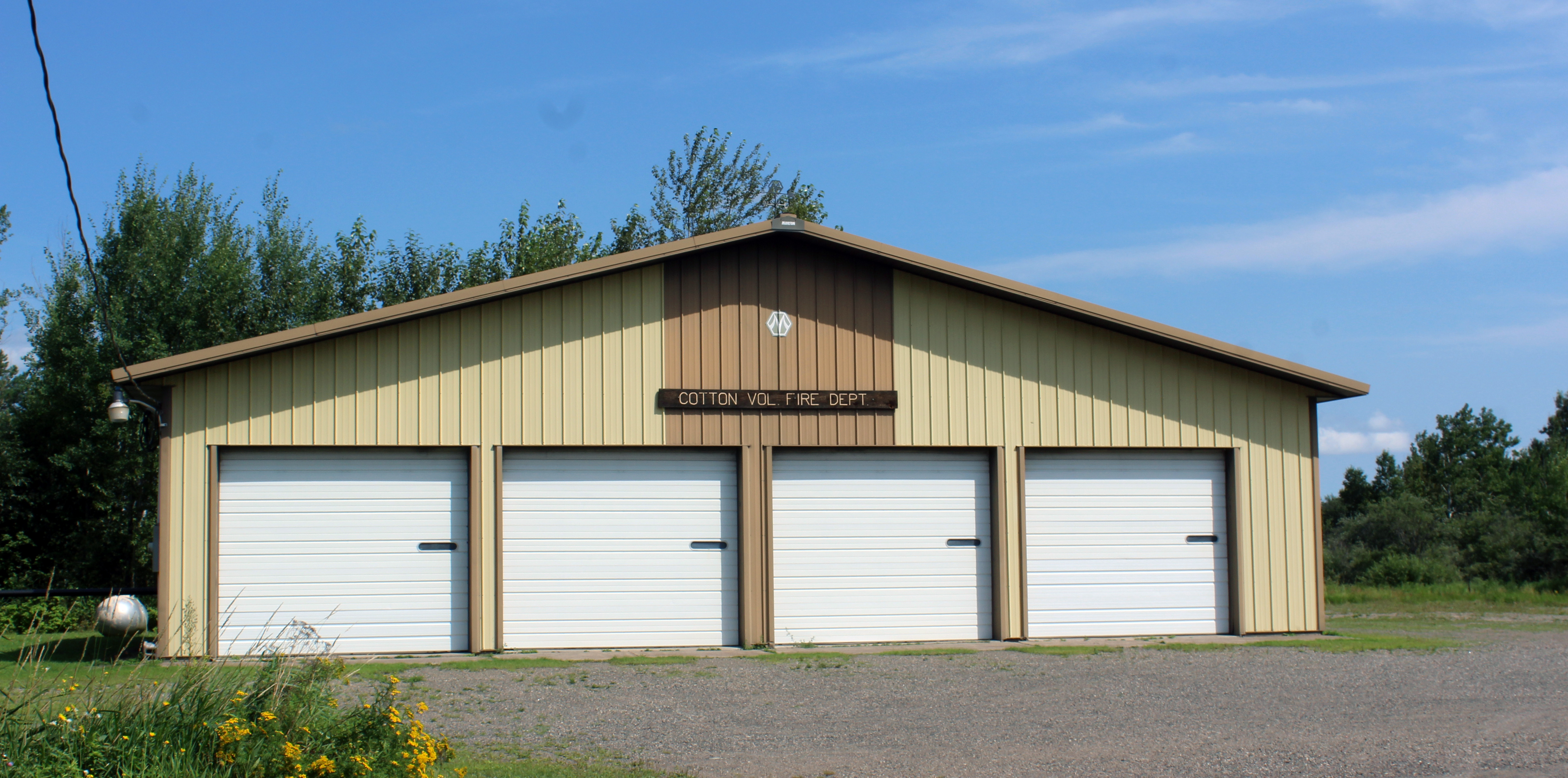
- Cotton Volunteer Fire Department

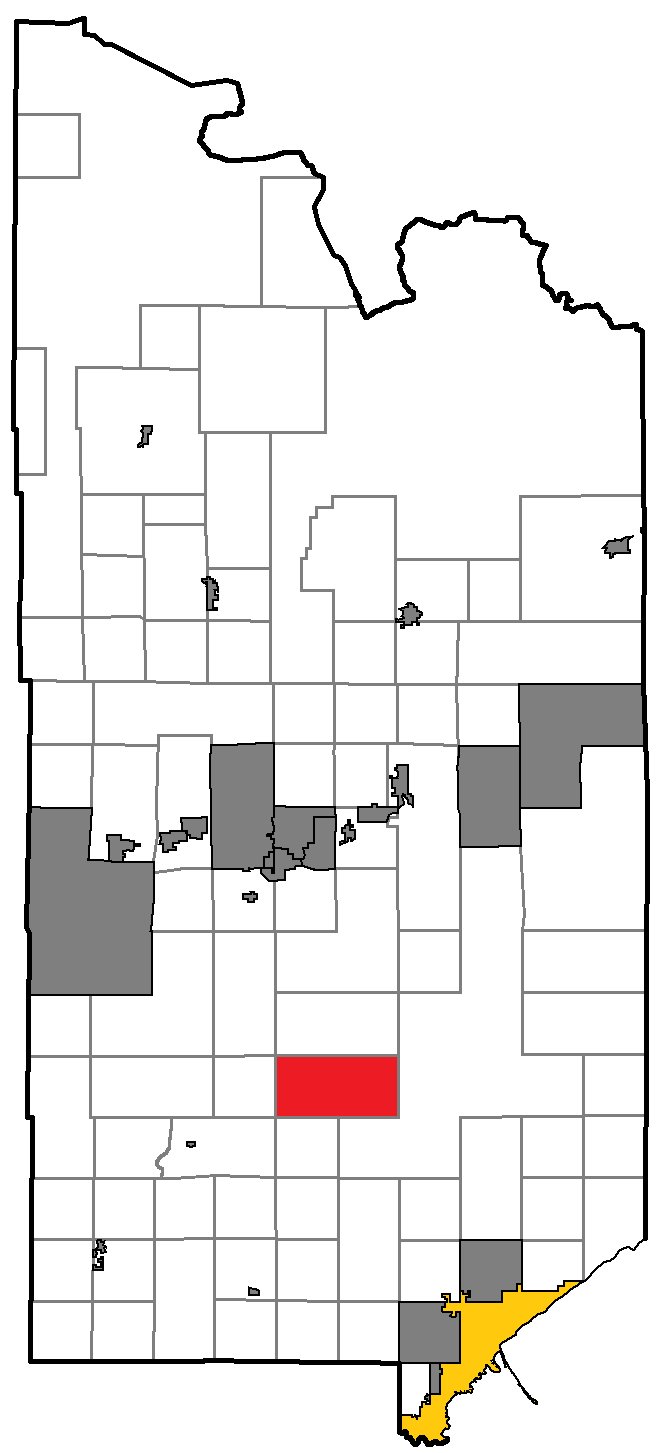
- Location of Cotton Township within St. Louis County, Minnesota
- Coordinates: 47°9′46″N 92°23′58″W
- Country: United States
- State: Minnesota
- County: Saint Louis

Area
  - Total: 72.1 sq mi (186.7 km^{2})
  - Land: 69.3 sq mi (179.6 km^{2})
  - Water: 2.7 sq mi (7.1 km^{2})
- Elevation: 1,342 ft (409 m)

Population (2020)
  - Total: 460
  - Density: 6.6/sq mi (2.6/km^{2})
- Time zone: UTC-6 (Central (CST))
  - Summer (DST): UTC-5 (CDT)
- ZIP codes: 55724
- Area code: 218
- FIPS code: 27-13528
- GNIS feature ID: 0663880
- Website: https://www.cottontownship.net/

Cotton Township is a township in Saint Louis County, Minnesota, United States. The population was 460 at the 2020 census.

U.S. Highway 53 serves as a main route in the township.

The unincorporated community of Cotton is located within Cotton Township.

The community of Cotton is located 36 miles north of the city of Duluth at the junction of U.S. Highway 53 and Saint Louis County Road 52. Cotton is located 27 miles south of the city of Virginia.

== History ==
Cotton Township was named for Joseph Bell Cotton, a state legislator.

== Geography ==
According to the United States Census Bureau, the township has a total area of 72.1 square miles (187 km^{2}); 69.3 square miles (179 km^{2}) is land and 2.7 square miles (7.0 km^{2}), or 3.79%, is water.

The Whiteface River flows through the township.

=== Adjacent townships ===
The following are adjacent to Cotton Township :

- Northland Township (south)
- Ellsburg Township (north)
- Kelsey Township (west)
- Meadowlands Township (southwest)
- McDavitt Township (northwest)
- Whiteface Reservoir Unorganized Territory (east)

=== Unincorporated communities ===
- Cotton
- Shaw
- Whiteface

The eastern portion of Cotton Township is located within the Cloquet Valley State Forest of Saint Louis County.

== Demographics ==
As of the census of 2000, there were 506 people, 192 households, and 142 families residing in the township. The population density was 7.3 inhabitants per square mile (2.8/km^{2}). There were 384 housing units at an average density of 5.5 per square mile (2.1/km^{2}). The racial makeup of the township was 99.21% White, 0.59% Native American, and 0.20% from two or more races. Hispanic or Latino of any race were 0.20% of the population.

There were 192 households, out of which 28.1% had children under the age of 18 living with them, 67.2% were married couples living together, 3.1% had a female householder with no husband present, and 26.0% were non-families. 20.3% of all households were made up of individuals, and 5.7% had someone living alone who was 65 years of age or older. The average household size was 2.58 and the average family size was 2.92.

In the township the population was spread out, with 21.3% under the age of 18, 7.7% from 18 to 24, 23.3% from 25 to 44, 31.6% from 45 to 64, and 16.0% who were 65 years of age or older. The median age was 44 years. For every 100 females, there were 96.9 males. For every 100 females age 18 and over, there were 98.0 males.

The median income for a household in the township was $40,313, and the median income for a family was $46,042. Males had a median income of $37,059 versus $21,500 for females. The per capita income for the township was $16,216. About 0.7% of families and 5.6% of the population were below the poverty line, including 4.3% of those under age 18 and 9.1% of those age 65 or over.

== See also ==
- U.S. Highway 53
- Saint Louis County Road 52 – Arkola Road – Comstock Lake Road
