= Van Buren Township, St. Louis County, Minnesota =

Van Buren Township, Minnesota
- Township
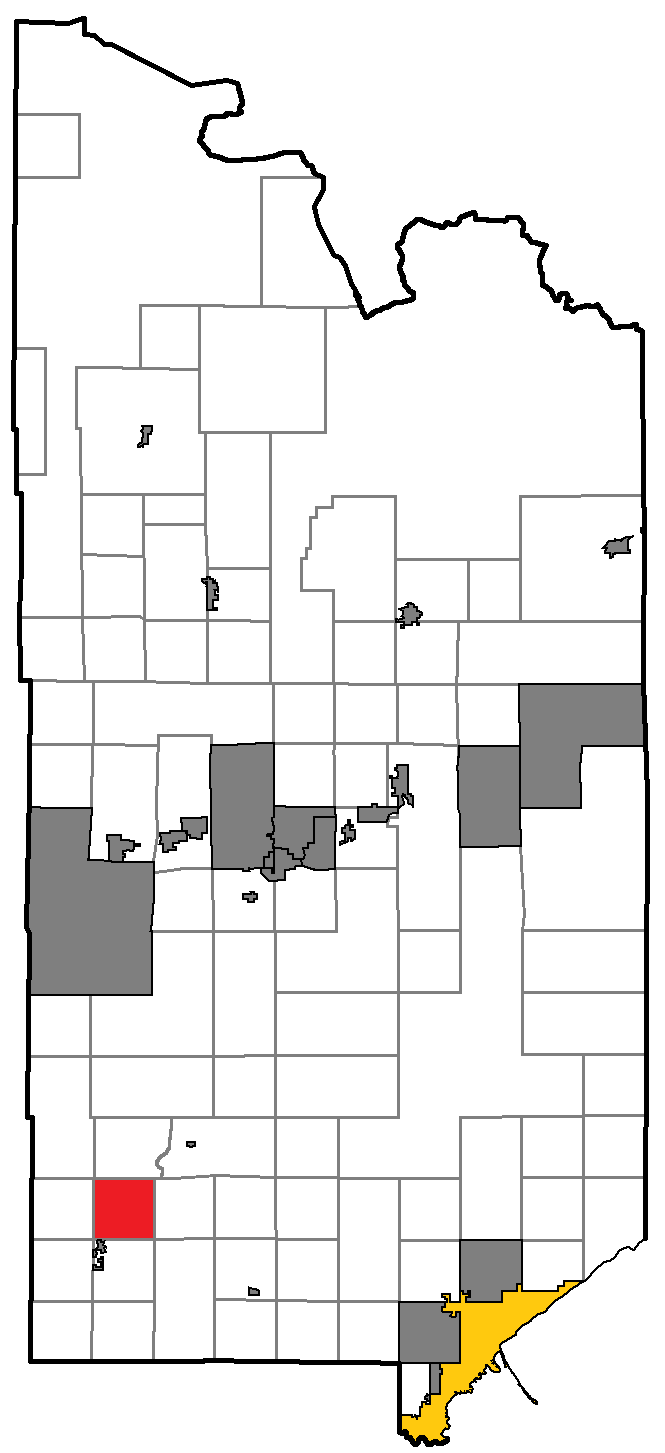
- Location of Van Buren Township within St. Louis County, Minnesota
- Coordinates: 46°58′32″N 92°50′31″W
- Country: United States
- State: Minnesota
- County: Saint Louis

Area
  - Total: 35.6 sq mi (92.2 km^{2})
  - Land: 35.3 sq mi (91.4 km^{2})
  - Water: 0.31 sq mi (0.8 km^{2})
- Elevation: 1,257 ft (383 m)

Population (2020)
  - Total: 164
  - Density: 4.65/sq mi (1.79/km^{2})
- Time zone: UTC-6 (Central (CST))
  - Summer (DST): UTC-5 (CDT)
- FIPS code: 27-66586
- GNIS feature ID: 0665851

Van Buren Township is a township in Saint Louis County, Minnesota, United States. It was named for Martin Van Buren, the eighth President of the United States. The population was 164 at the 2020 census.

State Highway 73 (MN 73) and Saint Louis County Road 29 (CR 29) are two of the main routes in the township. Floodwood is nearby.

== Geography ==
According to the United States Census Bureau, the township has a total area of 35.6 square miles (92 km^{2}); 35.3 square miles (91 km^{2}) is land and 0.3 square miles (0.78 km^{2}), or 0.87%, is water.

The Saint Louis River flows through the southern and east–central portions of Van Buren Township.

The Whiteface River briefly enters the east–central part of the township.

The Floodwood River flows through the western portion of Van Buren Township.

=== Adjacent townships, cities, and communities ===
The following are adjacent to Van Buren Township :

- The city of Floodwood (south-southwest)
- Floodwood Township (south)
- Arrowhead Township (southeast)
- Ness Township (east)
- Meadowlands Township (northeast)
- The city of Meadowlands (northeast)
- Elmer Township (north)
- Cedar Valley Township (northwest)
- Potshot Lake Unorganized Territory (west)
- Halden Township (southwest)

== Demographics ==
At the 2000 census there were 175 people, 66 households, and 48 families living in the township. The population density was 5.0 people per square mile (1.9/km^{2}). There were 89 housing units at an average density of 2.5/sq mi (1.0/km^{2}). The racial makeup of the township was 98.86% White, 0.57% Native American and 0.57% Asian. Of the 66 households 33.3% had children under the age of 18 living with them, 69.7% were married couples living together, and 25.8% were non-families. 21.2% of households were one person and 7.6% were one person aged 65 or older. The average household size was 2.65 and the average family size was 3.08.

The age distribution was 25.7% under the age of 18, 6.9% from 18 to 24, 26.9% from 25 to 44, 28.0% from 45 to 64, and 12.6% 65 or older. The median age was 40 years. For every 100 females, there were 127.3 males. For every 100 females age 18 and over, there were 120.3 males.

The median household income was $33,250 and the median family income was $39,063. Males had a median income of $36,250 versus $36,875 for females. The per capita income for the township was $16,509. About 11.1% of families and 16.8% of the population were below the poverty line, including 17.5% of those under the age of eighteen and 46.7% of those sixty five or over.
