= Whiteface =

Whiteface may refer to:

== Makeup ==
- The whiteface clown, a form of clown makeup
- Whiteface (performance)

== Places in the United States ==
- Whiteface, Texas, a town
  - Whiteface Consolidated Independent School District, a public school district based in Whiteface, Texas
- Whiteface, Minnesota
- Whiteface Mountain, the fifth-highest mountain in New York state
- Whiteface Mountain, the highest mountain in Simi Valley, California
- Mount Whiteface, in the White Mountains of New Hampshire
- Whiteface Reservoir, Minnesota, an unorganized territory
- Whiteface River (Minnesota)
- Whiteface River (New Hampshire)

== Other ==
- Whiteface (band), a band from Atlanta in the 1970s
- Whiteface Dartmoor, a breed of sheep
- Whiteface cattle, vernacular name, especially in the United States, for Hereford cattle
- Three species of birds in the genus Aphelocephala
- Dragonflies in the genus Leucorrhinia

== See also ==
- Blackface (disambiguation)
