= Kelsey, Minnesota =

Kelsey
- Unincorporated community
- Location within Minnesota Location within the United States
- Coordinates: 47°09′14″N 92°35′58″W
- Country: United States
- State: Minnesota
- County: Saint Louis
- Township: Kelsey Township
- Elevation: 1,302 ft (397 m)

Population
  - Total: 20
- Time zone: UTC-6 (Central (CST))
  - Summer (DST): UTC-5 (CDT)
- ZIP code: 55724
- Area code: 218
- GNIS feature ID: 661627

Kelsey is an unincorporated community in Kelsey Township, Saint Louis County, Minnesota, United States.

The community is located seven miles west of Cotton, near the intersection of Saint Louis County Highway 7 and County Road 52 (Arkola Road).

The Whiteface River flows through the community.

== History ==
A post office called Kelsey was established in 1897, and remained in operation until 1988. The community was named for Kelsey D. Chase, a railroad official.
