= Shaw, Minnesota =

Shaw
- Unincorporated community
- Location within Minnesota Location within the United States
- Coordinates: 47°06′48″N 92°21′11″W
- Country: United States
- State: Minnesota
- County: Saint Louis
- Township: Cotton Township
- Elevation: 1,381 ft (421 m)

Population
  - Total: 10
- Time zone: UTC-6 (Central (CST))
  - Summer (DST): UTC-5 (CDT)
- ZIP codes: 55717 or 55724
- Area code: 218
- GNIS feature ID: 662421

Shaw is an unincorporated community in Saint Louis County, Minnesota, United States; located on Saint Louis County Road 15 (Munger Shaw Road), near Saint Louis County Road 49 (Three Lakes Road).

The community is located in the southeast corner of Cotton Township, near the boundary line; and is within the Cloquet Valley State Forest of Saint Louis County.

Bug Creek flows through the community.

The town was threatened, but ultimately spared, by the Munger-Shaw wildfire in May 2025.
