= Little Whiteface River =

Little Whiteface River may refer to:

- Little Whiteface River (North)
- Little Whiteface River (South)

== See also ==
- Whiteface (disambiguation)
