= Ness Township, St. Louis County, Minnesota =

Ness Township, Minnesota
- Township
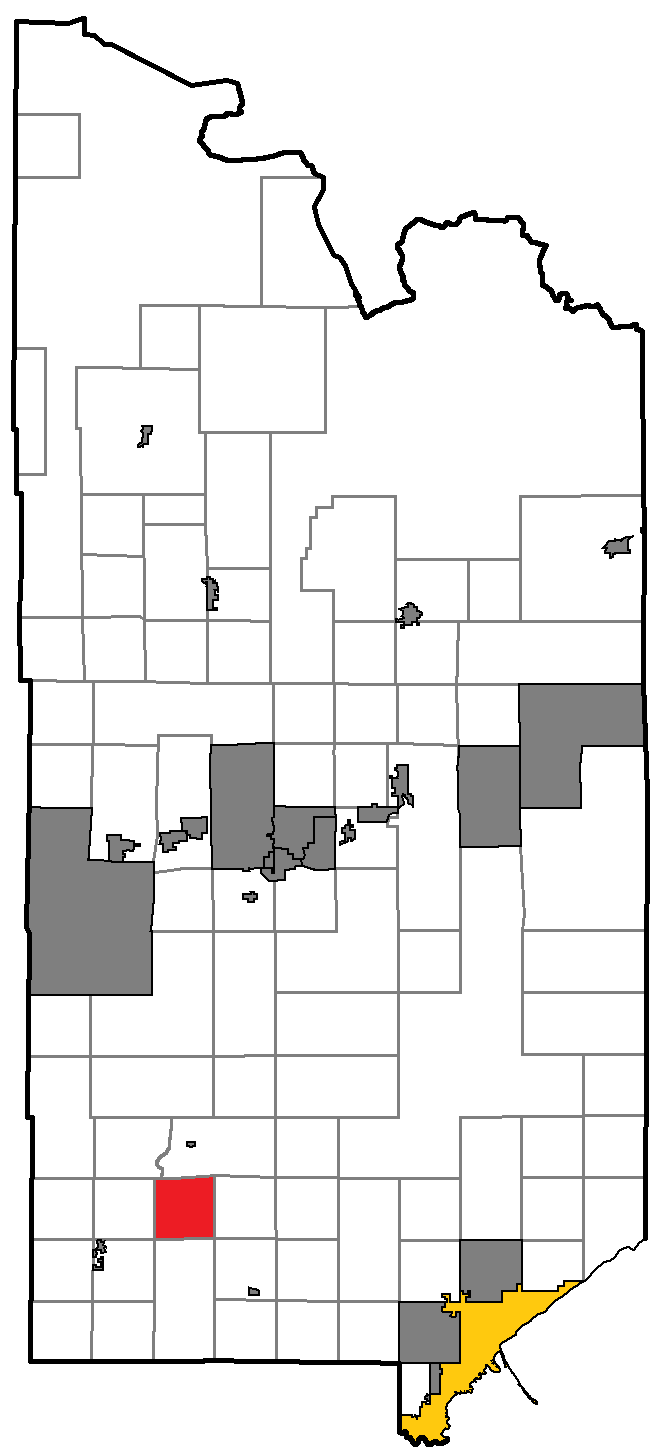
- Location of Ness Township within St. Louis County, Minnesota
- Coordinates: 46°59′44″N 92°45′11″W
- Country: United States
- State: Minnesota
- County: Saint Louis

Area
  - Total: 35.2 sq mi (91.2 km^{2})
  - Land: 34.9 sq mi (90.3 km^{2})
  - Water: 0.35 sq mi (0.9 km^{2})
- Elevation: 1,270 ft (387 m)

Population (2020)
  - Total: 68
  - Density: 2.0/sq mi (0.75/km^{2})
- Time zone: UTC-6 (Central (CST))
  - Summer (DST): UTC-5 (CDT)
- FIPS code: 27-45232
- GNIS feature ID: 0665080

Ness Township is a township in Saint Louis County, Minnesota, United States. The population was 68 at the 2020 census.

Saint Louis County Road 29 (CR 29) passes through the northwest corner of Ness Township. County Road 5 (CR 5) runs north–south through the middle of the township.

== Geography ==
According to the United States Census Bureau, the township has a total area of 35.2 square miles (91 km^{2}); 34.9 square miles (90 km^{2}) is land and 0.3 square miles (0.78 km^{2}), or 0.97%, is water.

The Saint Louis River flows through the extreme northwest corner of the township. The Whiteface River flows through the northwest portion of Ness Township.

=== Adjacent townships ===
The following are adjacent to Ness Township :

- Meadowlands Township (north)
- Alborn Township (east)
- Culver Township (southeast)
- Arrowhead Township (south)
- Floodwood Township (southwest)
- Van Buren Township (west)
- Elmer Township (northwest)

== Demographics ==
At the 2000 census there were 60 people, 27 households, and 16 families living in the township. The population density was 1.7 people per square mile (0.7/km^{2}). There were 57 housing units at an average density of 1.6/sq mi (0.6/km^{2}). The racial makeup of the township was 100.00% White. Hispanic or Latino of any race were 3.33%.

Of the 27 households 18.5% had children under the age of 18 living with them, 48.1% were married couples living together, 7.4% had a female householder with no husband present, and 40.7% were non-families. 37.0% of households were one person and 7.4% were one person aged 65 or older. The average household size was 2.22 and the average family size was 2.88.

The age distribution was 20.0% under the age of 18, 1.7% from 18 to 24, 31.7% from 25 to 44, 26.7% from 45 to 64, and 20.0% 65 or older. The median age was 44 years. For every 100 females, there were 106.9 males. For every 100 females age 18 and over, there were 152.6 males.

The median household income was $39,167 and the median family income was $43,750. Males had a median income of $36,250 versus $24,583 for females. The per capita income for the township was $15,934. There were no families and 13.3% of the population living below the poverty line, including no under eighteens and 37.5% of those over 64.
