= Whiteface, Minnesota =

Whiteface
- Unincorporated community
- Location within Minnesota Location within the United States
- Coordinates: 47°11′12″N 92°21′59″W
- Country: United States
- State: Minnesota
- County: Saint Louis
- Township: Cotton Township
- Elevation: 1,371 ft (418 m)

Population
  - Total: 10
- Time zone: UTC-6 (Central (CST))
  - Summer (DST): UTC-5 (CDT)
- ZIP code: 55724
- Area code: 218
- GNIS feature ID: 662792

Whiteface is an unincorporated community in Cotton Township, Saint Louis County, Minnesota, United States.

The community is located 6 miles east of Cotton at the intersection of Saint Louis County Road 52 (Comstock Lake Road) and County Road 224 (Mink Road).

Whiteface is located within the Cloquet Valley State Forest of Saint Louis County.

The Whiteface River flows through the community.
