= Kelsey Township, St. Louis County, Minnesota =

Kelsey Township, Minnesota
- Township
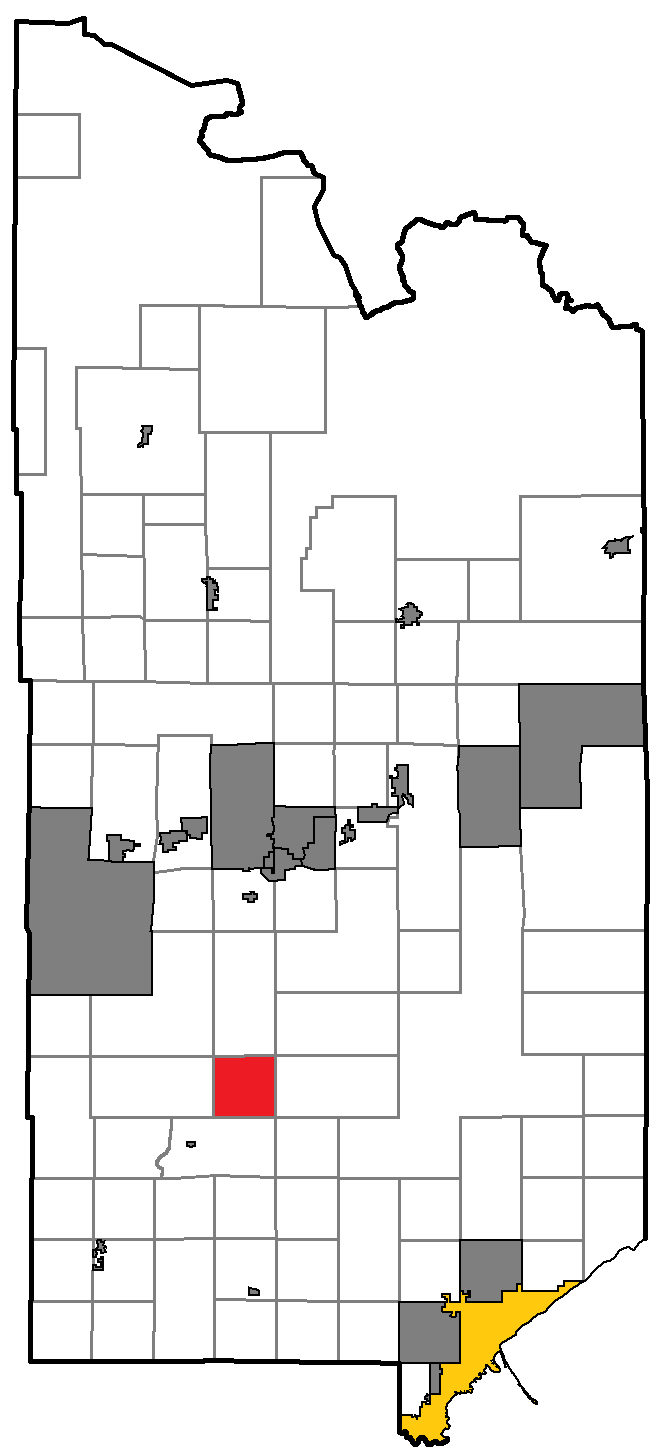
- Location of Kelsey Township within St. Louis County, Minnesota

- Location within the state of Minnesota Kelsey Township, Minnesota (the United States)
- Coordinates: 47°9′11″N 92°36′28″W
- Country: United States
- State: Minnesota
- County: Saint Louis

Area
  - Total: 35.6 sq mi (92.3 km^{2})
  - Land: 35.3 sq mi (91.3 km^{2})
  - Water: 0.39 sq mi (1.0 km^{2})
- Elevation: 1,280 ft (390 m)

Population (2020)
  - Total: 152
  - Density: 4.31/sq mi (1.66/km^{2})
- Time zone: UTC-6 (Central (CST))
  - Summer (DST): UTC-5 (CDT)
- FIPS code: 27-32696
- GNIS feature ID: 0664610

Kelsey Township is a township in Saint Louis County, Minnesota, United States. The population was 152 at the 2020 census.

Saint Louis County Highway 7 serves as a main route in the township. County Road 52 (Arkola Road) also passes through the township.

The unincorporated community of Kelsey is located within Kelsey Township.

== History ==
Kelsey Township was named for Kelsey D. Chase, a railroad official.

== Geography ==
According to the United States Census Bureau, the township has a total area of 35.6 square miles (92 km^{2}); 35.2 square miles (91 km^{2}) is land and 0.4 square miles (1.0 km^{2}), or 1.07%, is water.

The Whiteface River flows through the township.

=== Adjacent townships ===
The following are adjacent to Kelsey Township :

- Cotton Township (east)
- Toivola Township (west)
- Meadowlands Township (south)
- Northland Township (southeast)
- McDavitt Township (north)
- Ellsburg Township (northeast)
- Lavell Township (northwest)

=== Unincorporated communities ===
- Kelsey

== Demographics ==
At the 2000 census there were 141 people, 59 households, and 44 families living in the township. The population density was 4.0 people per square mile (1.5/km^{2}). There were 84 housing units at an average density of 2.4/sq mi (0.9/km^{2}). The racial makeup of the township was 97.87% White, 0.71% Native American, and 1.42% from two or more races. Hispanic or Latino of any race were 0.71%.

Of the 59 households 20.3% had children under the age of 18 living with them, 64.4% were married couples living together, 5.1% had a female householder with no husband present, and 25.4% were non-families. 23.7% of households were one person and 6.8% were one person aged 65 or older. The average household size was 2.39 and the average family size was 2.80.

The age distribution was 19.1% under the age of 18, 9.9% from 18 to 24, 22.7% from 25 to 44, 34.8% from 45 to 64, and 13.5% 65 or older. The median age was 44 years. For every 100 females, there were 107.4 males. For every 100 females age 18 and over, there were 119.2 males.

The median household income was $39,583 and the median family income was $42,188. Males had a median income of $35,000 versus $11,429 for females. The per capita income for the township was $15,419. There were 22.4% of families and 30.9% of the population living below the poverty line, including 46.2% of under eighteens and 12.5% of those over 64.
