= Taft, Minnesota =

Taft
- Unincorporated community
- Location within Minnesota Location within the United States
- Coordinates: 46°59′40″N 92°19′58″W
- Country: United States
- State: Minnesota
- County: Saint Louis
- Township: Grand Lake Township
- Elevation: 1,339 ft (408 m)

Population
  - Total: 20
- Time zone: UTC-6 (Central (CST))
  - Summer (DST): UTC-5 (CDT)
- ZIP codes: 55803
- Area code: 218
- GNIS feature ID: 662618

Taft is an unincorporated community in Grand Lake Township, Saint Louis County, Minnesota, United States.

The community is located 24 miles northwest of the city of Duluth at the junction of Saint Louis County Road 15 (Munger Shaw Road) and Saint Louis County Road 48 (Taft Road).

Taft is located within the Cloquet Valley State Forest in Saint Louis County. Fredenberg Township is also in the area.

== History ==
The community of Taft is named after former President William Howard Taft, who held the office from 1909 to 1913.

Taft was once a water stop for trains traveling along the former Northeastern Railway in Saint Louis County.

Although buildings such as the Depot, old schoolhouse, and railroad crew section house are no longer in existence; their imprints can still be seen.

Just opposite of the Ush-kab-wan River from Taft, was the community of Crysler, which no longer exists.
