= Lavell Township, St. Louis County, Minnesota =

Lavell Township, Minnesota
- Township
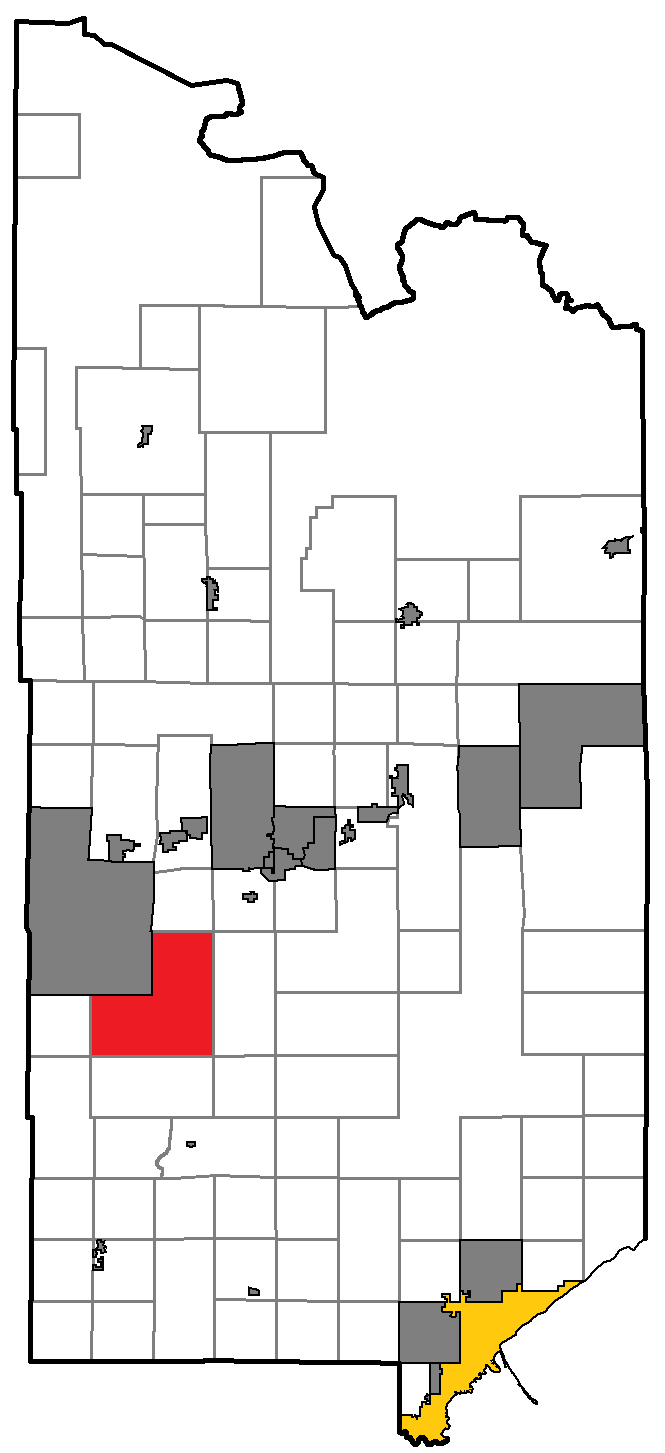
- Location of Lavell Township within St. Louis County, Minnesota
- Coordinates: 47°15′54″N 92°45′47″W
- Country: United States
- State: Minnesota
- County: Saint Louis

Area
  - Total: 108.3 sq mi (280.5 km^{2})
  - Land: 107.8 sq mi (279.1 km^{2})
  - Water: 0.50 sq mi (1.3 km^{2})
- Elevation: 1,289 ft (393 m)

Population (2020)
  - Total: 285
  - Density: 2.64/sq mi (1.02/km^{2})
- Time zone: UTC-6 (Central (CST))
  - Summer (DST): UTC-5 (CDT)
- FIPS code: 27-35774
- GNIS feature ID: 0664734

Lavell Township is a township in Saint Louis County, Minnesota, United States. The population was 285 at the 2020 census.

Saint Louis County Highways 5, 16, 25, and 27 are four of the main routes in Lavell Township.

Lavell Township bears the name of a French settler.

== Geography ==
According to the United States Census Bureau, the township has a total area of 108.3 square miles (280 km^{2}); 107.8 square miles (279 km^{2}) is land and 0.5 square miles (1.3 km^{2}), or 0.48%, is water.

The West Swan River and the East Swan River both flow through the western portion of Lavell Township.

The West Two River flows through the northeast corner of the township.

The Saint Louis River flows through the southeast portion of Lavell Township.

=== Adjacent townships, cities, and communities ===
The following are adjacent to Lavell Township :

- McDavitt Township (east)
- The unincorporated community of Zim (east)
- Kelsey Township (southeast)
- Toivola Township (south)
- Cedar Valley Township (southwest)
- Janette Lake Unorganized Territory (west)
- The unincorporated community of Silica (west)
- The city of Hibbing (west and northwest)
- Cherry Township (north)
- Clinton Township (northeast)
- The unincorporated community of Forbes (northeast)

Saint Louis County Highway 5 (CR 5) runs north–south along Lavell Township's western boundary line with adjacent city of Hibbing in the northwest portion of the township. Highway 5 also runs north–south through the southern middle of the township.

County Highway 16 (CR 16) runs east–west along Lavell Township's northern boundary line with adjacent Cherry Township.

County Highway 25 (CR 25) runs north–south through the northeast portion of Lavell Township.

County Highway 27 (CR 27) runs east–west through the middle of Lavell Township.

== Demographics ==
As of the census of 2000, there were 363 people, 131 households, and 105 families living in the township. The population density was 3.4 inhabitants per square mile (1.3/km^{2}). There were 159 housing units at an average density of 1.5 per square mile (0.58/km^{2}). The racial makeup of the township was 92.29% White, 0.83% African American, 1.65% Native American, 0.28% Asian, 2.48% from other races, and 2.48% from two or more races. Hispanic or Latino of any race were 3.58% of the population.

There were 131 households, out of which 32.1% had children under the age of 18 living with them, 66.4% were married couples living together, 9.2% had a female householder with no husband present, and 19.8% were non-families. 15.3% of all households were made up of individuals, and 2.3% had someone living alone who was 65 years of age or older. The average household size was 2.77 and the average family size was 3.04.

In the township the population was spread out, with 27.5% under the age of 18, 6.6% from 18 to 24, 28.7% from 25 to 44, 29.2% from 45 to 64, and 8.0% who were 65 years of age or older. The median age was 39 years. For every 100 females, there were 108.6 males. For every 100 females age 18 and over, there were 107.1 males.

The median income for a household in the township was $43,056, and the median income for a family was $44,643. Males had a median income of $40,938 versus $23,750 for females. The per capita income for the township was $16,538. About 7.5% of families and 7.3% of the population were below the poverty line, including 6.0% of those under age 18 and 22.7% of those age 65 or over.
