= Fish Lake Reservoir =

Reservoir in Minnesota, United States

Coordinates: 46°57′24″N 92°16′43″W

- Fish Lake Flowage
- Location within Minnesota Location within the United States
- Location: Saint Louis County, Minnesota
- Type: artificial
- Primary inflows: Beaver River
- Primary outflows: Beaver River
- Basin countries: United States
- Surface area: 3,526 acres (1,427 ha)

Fish Lake Reservoir, sometimes called Fish Lake Flowage, is a 3,526-acre (14.27 km^{2}) impoundment of the Beaver River, part of the Cloquet and Saint Louis River system, located 20 miles northwest of the city of Duluth, Minnesota. The Fish Lake Dam has been the site of archaeological excavations since 2000.

Fish Lake Reservoir, known locally as simply Fish Lake, spans the townships of Fredenberg Township, Canosia Township, and Grand Lake Township, in southern Saint Louis County, Minnesota.

Fish Lake Reservoir is a 3,071 acre lake located northwest of Duluth, with 75% (2,303 acres) littoral area and a maximum depth of 36 feet. Minnesota Power owns and operates a public access on the north side of the lake located at the end of Township Road 285. The Minnesota DNR also operates a public access located on the far west section of the lake, near Saint Louis County Road 15.

In March 2022, the Minnesota DNR approved fishing limits on five species of fish in Fish Lake Reservoir in order to increase the number and size of fish such as bluegill and crappies.
