= Rice Lake Township =

Rice Lake Township may refer to the following townships in the United States:

- Rice Lake Township, St. Louis County, Minnesota
- Rice Lake Township, North Dakota in Ward County
