= Fredenberg Township, St. Louis County, Minnesota =

Fredenberg Township, Minnesota
- Township
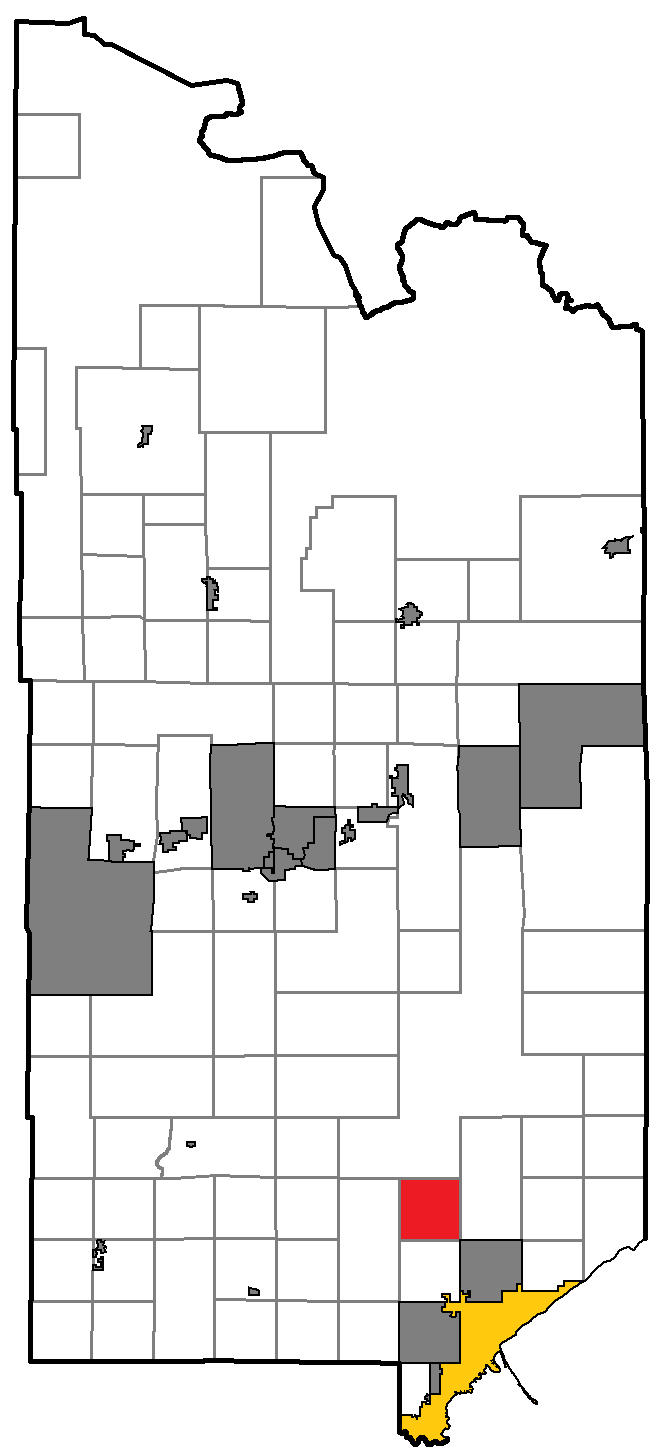
- Location of Fredenberg Township within St. Louis County
- Coordinates: 46°58′58″N 92°13′57″W
- Country: United States
- State: Minnesota
- County: Saint Louis

Area
  - Total: 35.9 sq mi (93.0 km^{2})
  - Land: 25.4 sq mi (65.8 km^{2})
  - Water: 10.5 sq mi (27.2 km^{2})
- Elevation: 1,348 ft (411 m)

Population (2020)
  - Total: 1,431
  - Density: 56.3/sq mi (21.7/km^{2})
- Time zone: UTC-6 (Central (CST))
  - Summer (DST): UTC-5 (CDT)
- ZIP codes: 55803
- Area code: 218
- FIPS code: 27-22508
- GNIS feature ID: 0664222
- Website: https://fredenberg.org/

Fredenberg Township is a township in Saint Louis County, Minnesota, United States. The population was 1,431 at the 2020 census.

Lavaque Road (County Road 48) serves as a main route in the township. Other routes include Fish Lake Road, Beaver River Road, and Taft Road.

== History ==
Fredenberg Township was named for Jacob Fredenberg, an early settler.

== Geography ==
According to the United States Census Bureau, the township has a total area of 35.9 square miles (93 km^{2}); 25.4 square miles (66 km^{2}) is land and 10.5 square miles (27 km^{2}), or 29.21%, is water.

The Cloquet River flows through the central portion of Fredenberg Township, and flows from Island Lake.

The Beaver River flows through the southwest part of the township.

Fish Lake and Island Lake Flowages are both partially located within Fredenberg Township. Both lakes are reservoirs originally designed for hydroelectric generation by Minnesota Power and Light.

=== Adjacent townships and communities ===
The following are adjacent to Fredenberg Township :

- Canosia Township (south)
- Gnesen Township (east)
- The city of Rice Lake (southeast)
- Grand Lake Township (west)
- The unincorporated community of Taft (west)
- Whiteface Reservoir Unorganized Territory (north)

The Cloquet Valley State Forest is to the immediate north of Fredenberg Township.

== Demographics ==
As of the census of 2000, there were 1,156 people, 439 households, and 352 families residing in the township. The population density was 32.2 inhabitants per square mile (12.4/km^{2}). There were 583 housing units at an average density of 22.9 per square mile (8.8/km^{2}). The racial makeup of the township was 98.70% White, 0.35% Native American, 0.17% Asian, 0.17% from other races, and 0.61% from two or more races. Hispanic or Latino of any race were 0.52% of the population.

There were 439 households, out of which 32.6% had children under the age of 18 living with them, 74.5% were married couples living together, 3.0% had a female householder with no husband present, and 19.8% were non-families. 13.9% of all households were made up of individuals, and 4.1% had someone living alone who was 65 years of age or older. The average household size was 2.63 and the average family size was 2.90.

In the township the population was spread out, with 23.0% under the age of 18, 5.8% from 18 to 24, 29.4% from 25 to 44, 33.4% from 45 to 64, and 8.4% who were 65 years of age or older. The median age was 41 years. For every 100 females, there were 108.7 males. For every 100 females age 18 and over, there were 112.4 males.

The median income for a household in the township was $58,750, and the median income for a family was $67,656. Males had a median income of $42,383 versus $28,611 for females. The per capita income for the township was $25,536. About 0.8% of families and 3.2% of the population were below the poverty line, including 2.6% of those under age 18 and 2.0% of those age 65 or over.
