= Island Lake, St. Louis County, Minnesota =

Island Lake
- Unincorporated community
- Location within Minnesota Location within the United States
- Coordinates: 47°00′45″N 92°11′56″W
- Country: United States
- State: Minnesota
- County: Saint Louis
- Township: Gnesen Township and Fredenberg Township
- Elevation: 1,371 ft (418 m)

Population
  - Total: 40
- Time zone: UTC-6 (Central (CST))
  - Summer (DST): UTC-5 (CDT)
- ZIP code: 55803
- Area code: 218

Island Lake is an unincorporated community in Saint Louis County, Minnesota, United States.

The community is located 18 miles north of the city of Duluth on Saint Louis County Road 4 (Rice Lake Road).

Island Lake is located within Gnesen Township and Fredenberg Township. Boulder Lake is also in the vicinity.

== Climate ==
Climate data for Island Lake 4E, Minnesota, 1991–2020 normals: 1410ft (430m)
Month	Jan	Feb	Mar	Apr	May	Jun	Jul	Aug	Sep	Oct	Nov	Dec	Year
Record high °F (°C)	46 (8)	58 (14)	74 (23)	77 (25)	90 (32)	88 (31)	91 (33)	91 (33)	86 (30)	83 (28)	69 (21)	45 (7)	91 (33)
Mean maximum °F (°C)	37.5 (3.1)	43.1 (6.2)	57.7 (14.3)	70.3 (21.3)	82.5 (28.1)	84.4 (29.1)	86.5 (30.3)	85.5 (29.7)	80.8 (27.1)	71.6 (22.0)	51.5 (10.8)	38.8 (3.8)	85.0 (29.4)
Mean daily maximum °F (°C)	17.1 (−8.3)	23.4 (−4.8)	35.9 (2.2)	48.3 (9.1)	62.9 (17.2)	71.6 (22.0)	76.5 (24.7)	74.9 (23.8)	66.1 (18.9)	51.2 (10.7)	35.1 (1.7)	22.6 (−5.2)	48.8 (9.3)
Daily mean °F (°C)	7.3 (−13.7)	12.0 (−11.1)	25.3 (−3.7)	38.2 (3.4)	51.2 (10.7)	60.9 (16.1)	65.9 (18.8)	64.5 (18.1)	56.2 (13.4)	42.7 (5.9)	28.1 (−2.2)	14.8 (−9.6)	38.9 (3.8)
Mean daily minimum °F (°C)	−2.5 (−19.2)	0.6 (−17.4)	14.7 (−9.6)	28.0 (−2.2)	39.5 (4.2)	50.1 (10.1)	55.2 (12.9)	54.0 (12.2)	46.2 (7.9)	34.2 (1.2)	21.0 (−6.1)	7.0 (−13.9)	29.0 (−1.7)
Mean minimum °F (°C)	−27.4 (−33.0)	−22.5 (−30.3)	−13.1 (−25.1)	10.5 (−11.9)	26.9 (−2.8)	35.7 (2.1)	45.7 (7.6)	42.9 (6.1)	31.5 (−0.3)	22.1 (−5.5)	−0.2 (−17.9)	−16.2 (−26.8)	−26.9 (−32.7)
Record low °F (°C)	−36 (−38)	−37 (−38)	−28 (−33)	−4 (−20)	23 (−5)	31 (−1)	42 (6)	36 (2)	28 (−2)	17 (−8)	−11 (−24)	−27 (−33)	−37 (−38)
Average precipitation inches (mm)	1.00 (25)	0.98 (25)	1.41 (36)	2.36 (60)	3.40 (86)	4.40 (112)	4.08 (104)	3.46 (88)	3.49 (89)	2.91 (74)	1.76 (45)	1.42 (36)	30.67 (780)
Average snowfall inches (cm)	11.8 (30)	20.8 (53)	10.7 (27)	15.3 (39)	1.7 (4.3)	0.0 (0.0)	0.0 (0.0)	0.0 (0.0)	trace	2.0 (5.1)	10.3 (26)	22.5 (57)	95.1 (241.4)
Source 1: NOAA
Source 2: XMACIS (2010-2020 snowfall, temp records & monthly max/mins)
