= Canosia Township, St. Louis County, Minnesota =

Canosia Township, Minnesota
- Township
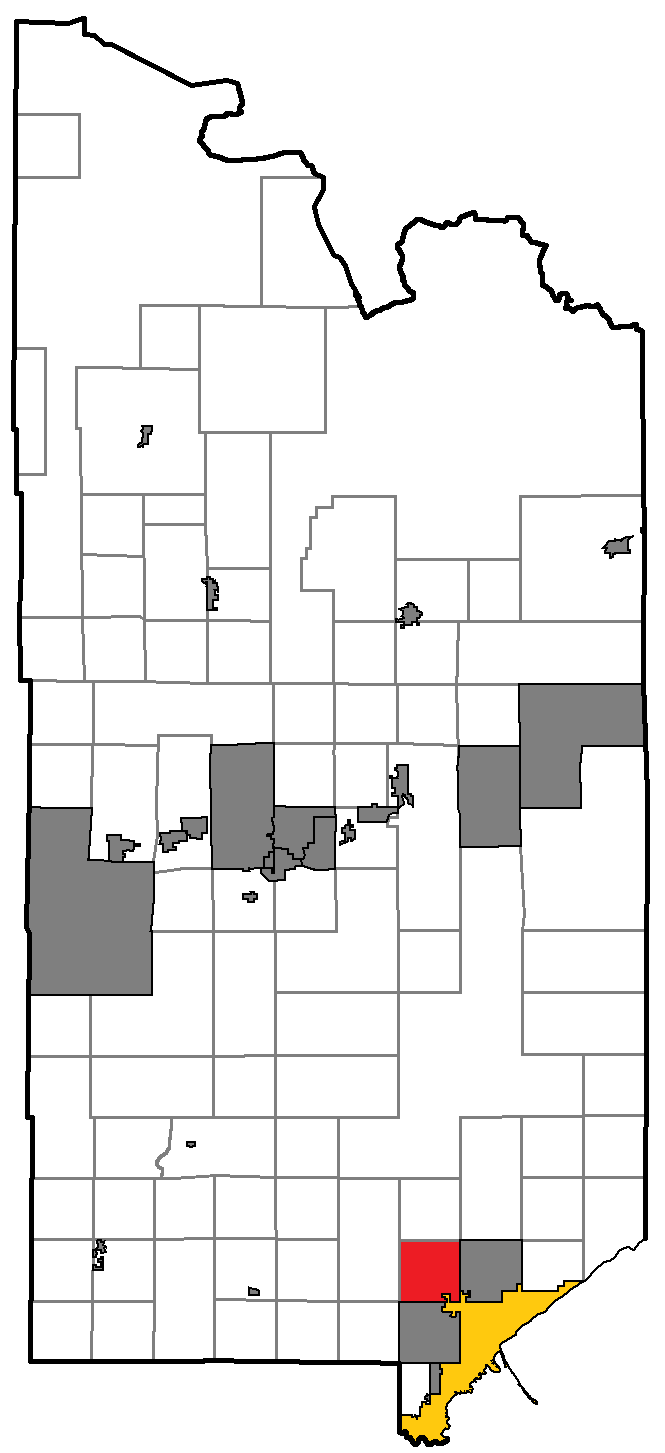
- Location of Canosia Township within St. Louis County, Minnesota
- Coordinates: 46°53′43″N 92°15′34″W
- Country: United States
- State: Minnesota
- County: Saint Louis

Area
  - Total: 35.7 sq mi (92.5 km^{2})
  - Land: 30.1 sq mi (78.0 km^{2})
  - Water: 5.6 sq mi (14.4 km^{2})
- Elevation: 1,430 ft (436 m)

Population (2020)
  - Total: 2,206
  - Density: 73.3/sq mi (28.3/km^{2})
- Time zone: UTC-6 (Central (CST))
  - Summer (DST): UTC-5 (CDT)
- ZIP code: 55811
- Area code: 218
- FIPS code: 27-09784
- GNIS feature ID: 0663745
- Website: https://townofcanosiamn.gov/

Canosia Township is an urban township in Saint Louis County, Minnesota, United States. Canosia is a name derived from the Ojibwe word ginoozhe, meaning "northern pike". The population was 2,206 at the 2020 census.

Midway Road (County Road 13) and Martin Road (County Road 9) are two of the main routes in the township. Other routes include Lavaque Road (County Road 48), Lavaque Bypass Road, and Old Miller Trunk Highway.

U.S. Highway 53 passes briefly through the southwest corner of Canosia Township. The Pike Lake business district is located within the township. The town hall and fire hall are located at the corner of Midway Rd. and Martin Rd. (4896 Midway Rd, Duluth MN 55811)

Canosia Township is administered by a three-person town board that meets monthly. The town board oversees township road maintenance, the Canosia Volunteer Fire Department, the township cemetery, recreation area and recycling shed.

== Geography ==
According to the United States Census Bureau, the township has a total area of 35.7 square miles (92 km^{2}); 30.1 square miles (78 km^{2}) is land and 5.6 square miles (15 km^{2}), or 15.60%, is water.

Pike Lake, Caribou Lake, Fish Lake, and Wild Rice Lake are all partially located within Canosia Township.

Canosia State Wildlife Management Area is located within the north–central part of the township. The wildlife area is a diverse deciduous and coniferous forest, wetland and bog complex, with upland openings and waterfowl impoundments with wild rice.

=== Adjacent townships and cities ===
The following are adjacent to Canosia Township :

- Fredenberg Township (north)
- Gnesen Township (northeast)
- The city of Rice Lake (east)
- Solway Township (southwest)
- Grand Lake Township (west)
- The city of Hermantown (south)

The Duluth International Airport is to the immediate southeast of Canosia Township.

=== Unincorporated communities ===
- Four Corners – Pike Lake business district

Seville Road runs east–west along Canosia Township's southern boundary line with adjacent city of Hermantown.

Solway Road runs north–south along Canosia Township's western boundary line with adjacent Grand Lake Township.

Lismore Road runs east–west along Canosia Township's northern boundary line with adjacent Fredenberg Township.

Town Line Road briefly runs north–south along Canosia Township's eastern boundary line with adjacent city of Rice Lake.

=== Cemeteries ===
The township contains one cemetery located on the corner of Midway Rd. and Seville Rd.

== Demographics ==
As of the census of 2000, there were 1,998 people, 751 households, and 573 families residing in the township. The population density was 66.3 inhabitants per square mile (25.6/km^{2}). There were 815 housing units at an average density of 27.1 per square mile (10.5/km^{2}). The racial makeup of the township was 97.80% White, 0.10% African American, 0.45% Native American, 0.30% Asian, 0.20% Pacific Islander, and 1.15% from two or more races. Hispanic or Latino of any race were 0.25% of the population.

There were 751 households, out of which 35.2% had children under the age of 18 living with them, 67.6% were married couples living together, 5.9% had a female householder with no husband present, and 23.7% were non-families. 20.1% of all households were made up of individuals, and 6.4% had someone living alone who was 65 years of age or older. The average household size was 2.66 and the average family size was 3.05.

In the township the population was spread out, with 27.0% under the age of 18, 5.9% from 18 to 24, 30.3% from 25 to 44, 28.3% from 45 to 64, and 8.6% who were 65 years of age or older. The median age was 38 years. For every 100 females, there were 97.8 males. For every 100 females age 18 and over, there were 101.0 males.

The median income for a household in the township was $52,813, and the median income for a family was $56,741. Males had a median income of $40,236 versus $28,155 for females. The per capita income for the township was $21,986. About 2.4% of families and 3.9% of the population were below the poverty line, including 4.0% of those under age 18 and 7.5% of those age 65 or over.

== See also ==
- U.S. Highway 53
- Saint Louis County Road 9 – Martin Road
- Saint Louis County Road 13 – Midway Road
- Saint Louis County Road 48 – Lavaque Road
