= Beaver River (Cloquet River tributary) =

Coordinates: 46.9582720°N 92.3204667°W

- Mouth of the Beaver River

Location
- Country: United States

Physical characteristics
- Source
  - location: Minnesota

The Beaver River is a 13.6-mile-long (21.9 km) tributary of the Cloquet River of Minnesota, located in southern Saint Louis County.

The Beaver River flows through Grand Lake Township and Fredenberg Township, northwest of Duluth.

== See also ==
- List of rivers of Minnesota
