= Rice Lake, Minnesota =

City in Minnesota, United States

Rice Lake
- City
- Location of the city of Rice Lake within Saint Louis County, Minnesota
- Coordinates: 46°52′45″N 92°7′12″W
- Country: United States
- State: Minnesota
- County: Saint Louis
- Founded: 1870
- Incorporated: October 22, 2015

Government
  - Mayor: Jayme Heim
  - Council: Darrel Johnson; Bob Quade; Mike Hendrickson; Mike Jeka

Area
  - Total: 33.15 sq mi (85.85 km^{2})
  - Land: 32.10 sq mi (83.15 km^{2})
  - Water: 1.04 sq mi (2.70 km^{2})
- Elevation: 1,380 ft (420 m)

Population (2020)
  - Total: 4,112
  - Estimate (2021): 4,101
  - Density: 128.1/sq mi (49.45/km^{2})
- Time zone: UTC-6 (CST)
  - Summer (DST): UTC-5 (CDT)
- ZIP codes: 55803
- Area code: 218
- FIPS code: 27-54060
- GNIS feature ID: 0000000
- Website: ricelakecitymn.com

Rice Lake is a city in Saint Louis County, Minnesota, United States. The population was 4,112 at the 2020 census.

Main routes include Rice Lake Road (County Road 4) and Martin Road (County Road 9).

Rice Lake Road runs north–south, and Martin Road runs east–west. Other routes include Howard Gnesen Road, Arnold Road, Calvary Road, West Tischer Road, and West Beyer Road.

== History ==
Rice Lake was founded as a township in 1870.

After portions of the township had been annexed by the city of Duluth, the residents began the process to be recognized as a city. On August 20, 2015, Administrative Law Judge Barbara J. Case signed an Order of Incorporation which allowed the township of Rice Lake to convert into the city of Rice Lake.

In an election held on October 13, 2015, Rice Lake residents elected a mayor and members of the city council. The results of the election were certified. The township was formally organized as a city on October 22, 2015.

== Geography ==
According to the United States Census Bureau, the township has a total area of 33.5 square miles (87 km^{2}); 32.3 square miles (84 km^{2}) is land and 1.1 square miles (2.8 km^{2}), or 3.43%, is water.

Wild Rice Lake is partially located within the city of Rice Lake, giving it its name.

Amity Creek and the East Branch of Amity Creek both flow through the city.

The Lester River rises in nearby Gnesen Township and flows generally southeastwardly through the city of Rice Lake and Lakewood Township, turning southward as it nears Lake Superior. The river flows into Lake Superior in eastern Duluth.

=== Adjacent townships, cities, and communities ===
The following are adjacent to Rice Lake:

- Canosia Township (west)
- Lakewood Township (east)
- Gnesen Township (north)
- Fredenberg Township (northwest)
- Normanna Township (northeast)
- The city of Duluth (south)
- The neighborhood of Duluth Heights (south)
- The neighborhood of Kenwood (south)
- The neighborhood of Woodland (southeast)

The Duluth International Airport is to the immediate southwest of the city of Rice Lake.

Ridgeview Road runs east–west along Rice Lake's southern boundary line with adjacent city of Duluth.

Lismore Road runs east–west along Rice Lake's northern boundary line with adjacent Gnesen Township.

Jean Duluth Road (County Road 37) runs north–south along Rice Lake's eastern boundary line with adjacent Lakewood Township; except for the southeast corner of Rice Lake where both Arnold Road and Martin Road together serve as the boundary line with adjacent city of Duluth.

Town Line Road briefly runs north–south along Rice Lake's western boundary line with adjacent Canosia Township.

== Demographics ==
Historical population
Census	Pop.	Note	%±
1880	63		—
1890	169		168.3%
1900	231		36.7%
1910	580		151.1%
1920	916		57.9%
1930	1,573		71.7%
1940	2,300		46.2%
1950	2,838		23.4%
1960	3,615		27.4%
1970	3,359		−7.1%
1980	3,861		14.9%
1990	3,883		0.6%
2000	4,139		6.6%
2010	4,099		−1.0%
2020	4,112		0.3%
2021 (est.)	4,101	▼	−0.3%
U.S. Decennial Census; 2020 Census

=== 2020 census ===
As of the 2020 census, Rice Lake had a population of 4,112. The median age was 44.6 years. 19.7% of residents were under the age of 18 and 18.3% of residents were 65 years of age or older. For every 100 females there were 105.6 males, and for every 100 females age 18 and over there were 105.9 males age 18 and over.

22.9% of residents lived in urban areas, while 77.1% lived in rural areas.

There were 1,670 households in Rice Lake, of which 24.9% had children under the age of 18 living in them. Of all households, 58.1% were married-couple households, 17.7% were households with a male householder and no spouse or partner present, and 15.7% were households with a female householder and no spouse or partner present. About 23.2% of all households were made up of individuals and 10.2% had someone living alone who was 65 years of age or older.

There were 1,743 housing units, of which 4.2% were vacant. The homeowner vacancy rate was 0.1% and the rental vacancy rate was 6.2%.

Racial composition as of the 2020 census
Race	Number	Percent
White	3,810	92.7%
Black or African American	20	0.5%
American Indian and Alaska Native	20	0.5%
Asian	14	0.3%
Native Hawaiian and Other Pacific Islander	0	0.0%
Some other race	21	0.5%
Two or more races	227	5.5%
Hispanic or Latino (of any race)	44	1.1%

=== 2000 census ===
As of the census of 2000, there were 4,139 people, 1,494 households, and 1,177 families residing in the township. The population density was 127.9 inhabitants per square mile (49.4/km^{2}). There were 1,518 housing units at an average density of 46.9 per square mile (18.1/km^{2}). The racial makeup of the township was 97.83% White, 0.29% African American, 0.58% Native American, 0.24% Asian, 0.10% Pacific Islander, 0.10% from other races, and 0.87% from two or more races. Hispanic or Latino of any race were 0.41% of the population.

There were 1,494 households, out of which 37.3% had children under the age of 18 living with them, 68.8% were married couples living together, 6.2% had a female householder with no husband present, and 21.2% were non-families. 16.8% of all households were made up of individuals, and 5.3% had someone living alone who was 65 years of age or older. The average household size was 2.77 and the average family size was 3.10.

In the township the population was spread out, with 27.5% under the age of 18, 7.2% from 18 to 24, 31.0% from 25 to 44, 24.9% from 45 to 64, and 9.4% who were 65 years of age or older. The median age was 38 years. For every 100 females, there were 103.1 males. For every 100 females age 18 and over, there were 104.9 males.

The median income for a household in the township was $51,341, and the median income for a family was $55,357. Males had a median income of $39,894 versus $28,095 for females. The per capita income for the township was $18,857. About 4.7% of families and 5.5% of the population were below the poverty line, including 4.9% of those under age 18 and 6.5% of those age 65 or over.

== Politics ==
2000-2020 precinct results
Year	Republican	Democratic	Third parties
2020	47.0% 1,290	51.0% 1,401	2.0% 55
2016	44.5% 1,090	47.6% 1,167	7.9% 194
2012	36.5% 894	61.4% 1,503	2.1% 51
2008	36.0% 892	61.9% 1,536	2.1% 53
2004	37.1% 912	62.2% 1,528	0.7% 16
2000	33.9% 727	59.2% 1,269	6.9% 148

== Education ==
The majority of Rice Lake is in the Duluth Public Schools school district. A small piece is in the Hermantown Public School District. Much of Duluth PS Rice Lake is zoned to Homecroft Elementary School in Rice Lake, while pieces in the east are zoned to Lakewood Elementary School. All of it is zoned to Ordean East Middle School and East High School.
