= Cloquet Valley State Forest =

State forest in Minnesota, United States

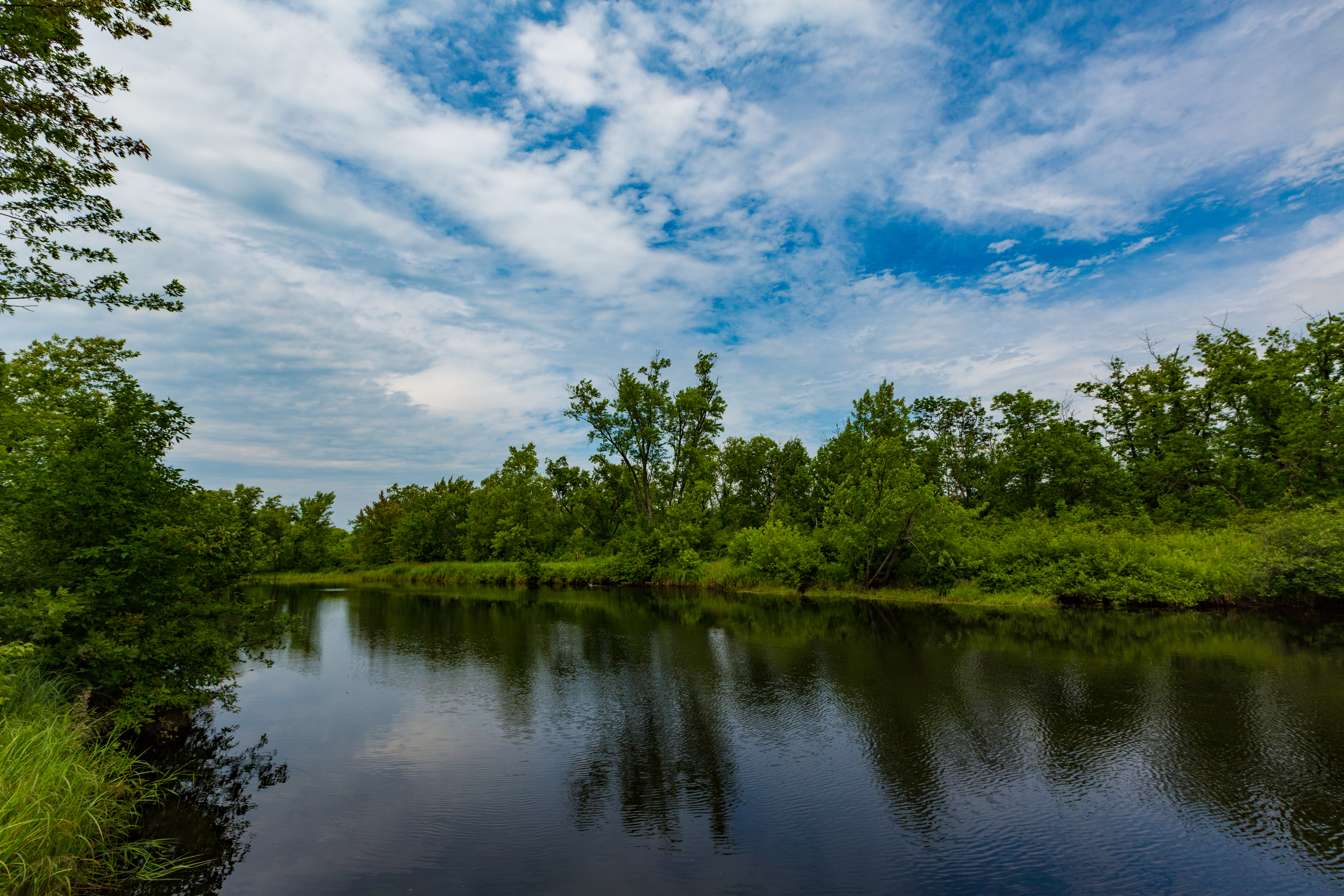
- Cloquet River - Cloquet Valley State Forest

- Location within Minnesota
- Interactive map of Cloquet Valley State Forest

Geography
- Location: Saint Louis County, Minnesota, United States
- Coordinates: 47°06′47″N 92°02′07″W
- Area: 327,098 acres (132,372 ha)

Administration
- Status: State-owned
- Authority: Minnesota Department of Natural Resources
- Website: www.dnr.state.mn.us/state_forests/sft00013/index.html

Ecology
- WWF Classification: Western Great Lakes forests

The Cloquet Valley State Forest encompasses 327,098 acres (1,323.7 km^{2}); 48,384 acres (195.8 km^{2}) of which (or 15%) are Minnesota Department of Natural Resources forestry administered lands.

Located in southeast Saint Louis County, the Cloquet Valley State Forest is located about 20 miles (32 km) north of Duluth and 25 miles (40 km) southeast of Virginia, in Minnesota's Arrowhead region. It spreads out over east–central Saint Louis County, generally in areas just north of the city of Duluth, but extending into the valleys of the Ush-kab-wan River, Whiteface River, and Cloquet River, for which it is named. The city of Cloquet is located in adjacent Carlton County.

Recreational activities offered at the Indian Lake campground within the forest include camping, fishing, and a canoe route on the Cloquet River.

The Superior National Forest is located immediately north of the Cloquet Valley State Forest.

Saint Louis County Road 4 and County Road 44 are two of the main routes in the Cloquet Valley State Forest area. County Road 4 runs north–south through the middle of the forest between Island Lake and the community of Markham. County Road 44 runs north–south through the eastern portion of the forest, passing through the community of Brimson at the northeast corner of the forest.

County Road 52 runs east–west through the northwest part of the forest, east of Cotton, passing through the community of Whiteface.

County Road 49 runs east–west through the western portion of the forest. The majority of CR 49 is unpaved gravel surface.

Harris Road runs east–west through the southwest part of the forest. The entire route of Harris Road is unpaved gravel surface.

County Road 547 / UT Road 9230 runs generally east–west through the northern portion of the forest in two separate segments. The first section of the route runs between Whiteface towards Markham. The second section of the route runs from near Markham to Brimson. The entire route of CR 547 / UT 9230 is unpaved gravel surface.

Fauna

The Cloquet Valley State Forest is home to many different animals. Among the animals that live in the forest there are: Pine Marten, Beaver, Otter, Wolves, Bear, White Tail Deer, Fox, Moose, and Lynx. Numerous species of birds can be found in the Cloquet Valley State Forest as well including: Bald Eagles, Great Horned Owls, and Common Loons. Fish found in the waters of the state forest include: Walleye, Musky, Northern Pike, Large/Small Mouth Bass, Yellow Perch, Sunfish and Crappie.

Biome

The Cloquet Valley State Forest sits within the Coniferous forest biome of northeastern Minnesota. Large stands of red and white pine can be found in this forest along with other coniferous trees such as Spruce, Fir, and Tamarack. Mixed in with these conifers are large portions of forest made up of Aspen and Birch.

== See also ==
- List of Minnesota state forests

== Sources ==
- "Cloquet Valley State Forest", Minnesota Department of Natural Resources, Retrieved April 29, 2008
