= Hermantown, Minnesota =

City in Minnesota, United States

Hermantown
- City
- Motto: The City of Quality Living
- Location of the city of Hermantown within St. Louis County, Minnesota
- Coordinates: 46°48′5″N 92°13′21″W
- Country: United States
- State: Minnesota
- County: Saint Louis
- Incorporated: December 31, 1975

Government
  - Mayor: Wayne Boucher

Area
  - Total: 34.38 sq mi (89.05 km^{2})
  - Land: 34.36 sq mi (89.00 km^{2})
  - Water: 0.023 sq mi (0.06 km^{2})
- Elevation: 1,365 ft (416 m)

Population (2020)
  - Total: 10,221
  - Estimate (2022): 10,126
  - Density: 297.5/sq mi (114.85/km^{2})
- Time zone: UTC-6 (Central)
  - Summer (DST): UTC-5 (CDT)
- ZIP codes: 55811, 55810
- Area code: 218
- FIPS code: 27-28682
- GNIS feature ID: 0660490
- Website: hermantownmn.com

Hermantown is a city in St. Louis County, Minnesota, United States. The population was 10,221 at the 2020 census. A suburb of Duluth, it was at one point the county's only city to grow in population, as much of the area's residential and commercial expansion occurred there. Hermantown is near the tip of Lake Superior.

The eastern part of Hermantown has an appearance typical of a lower-density bedroom community, with large, leafy lots and occasional subdivisions. The car-oriented "Miller Hill area", or Miller Trunk Corridor of Duluth, has sprawled well past the city boundary line into this part of Hermantown. The western part of Hermantown is more rural, reminiscent of the city's past agricultural focus. Hermantown's motto is "The City of Quality Living".

== History ==
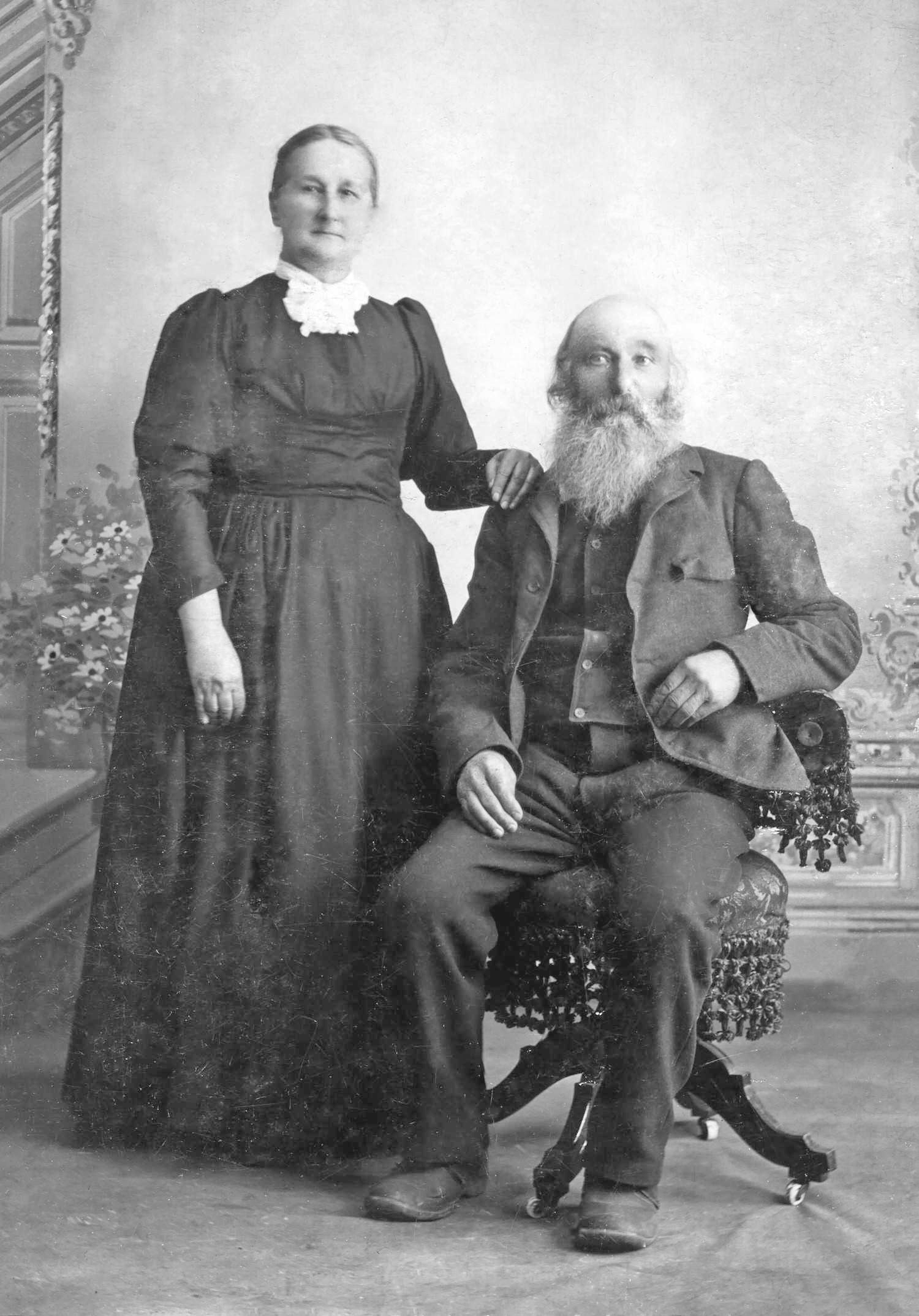
Lambert "Pat" Acker and his wife, Emelie Louisa Wilke

In 1867, August Kohlts and his friend Lambert "Pat" Acker filed for homesteads in Section 18, Township 50 North, Range 15 West. Both families had emigrated from Prussia. Acker arrived at about age five with his parents and siblings around 1835 and settled in Erie County, New York. He married Emelie Louisa Wilke on January 12, 1850. Kohlts and his wife, Emilie, immigrated in 1860. The Kohltses and Ackers resided in the town of Tonawanda on the Niagara River for some years with many other German settlers in the area. Citizenship was granted to Kohlts on March 20, 1868. Soon afterward, the Kohlts and Acker families set out from Buffalo, New York, heading west via the Great Lakes for the Hancock, Michigan, area of the Keweenaw Peninsula and its copper mines.

Perhaps lured by the availability of free land under the Homestead Act, the Kohlts family left for Minnesota. The federal census of June 1, 1870, records their presence in the Second Ward of the newly formed city of Duluth, while the Ackers arrived in Duluth in 1871. By January 1872, August Kohlts had established an 82-acre site in the wilderness outside Duluth. He and Acker were the first settlers in the area now known as Hermantown. The area was named for the Germanic chieftain known as Arminius or Herman.

Kohlts and Acker alternated between working in Duluth and clearing land at their rural homesteads on what is now Five Corners Road in Hermantown. They traveled between Duluth and their homesteads on a Native American trail that later became Piedmont Avenue and the Hermantown Road.

Hermantown's population got a boost from a new wave of homesteaders just before World War II. During the Great Depression, the federal government built nearly 100 "subsistence homestead" projects designed to move people trapped in poverty in the cities to new homes in rural or suburban locations. One of the two Minnesota projects was assigned to Hermantown.

The Jackson Project was completed in 1937. It is one of Hermantown's more interesting features, with a proliferation of "Jackson Homes" on certain roadways. These single-family dwellings were built during the Depression as subsistence homesteads. Many retain their original brick appearance, albeit with additions. Each of the 84 homesteads had a brick veneer farmhouse; half also had a garage-barn combination. Each had five or 10 acres (40,000 m^{2}) of land, and the family also received a pig, a cow, and 35 chickens. The idea was that the family would be able to raise its own food and use the profits from selling any surplus to work off its debt to the government. The units were sold to homesteaders on very liberal terms: the average price for the home and property was $2,687.40 plus interest.

The Jackson Project was one of the later projects built, which was a benefit because the quality of housing improved. Plumbing and electricity were now required in all homes. The homesteaders gave a new profile to what was then Herman Township. Now with 84 homes and families concentrated in one part of the community, the Project marked the start of Hermantown's transition from rural to suburban.

Hermantown was incorporated as a city on December 31, 1975.

The community of Adolph is in Hermantown's southwest corner.

== Geography ==
According to the United States Census Bureau, the city has an area of 34.37 square miles (89.02 km^{2}); 34.35 square miles (88.97 km^{2}) is land and 0.02 square miles (0.05 km^{2}) is water.

U.S. Highway 53, State Highway 194 (MN 194), and County Road 13 (Midway Road) are three of Hermantown's main routes. Others include Maple Grove Road, Haines Road, Arrowhead Road, Stebner Road, Morris Thomas Road, Ugstad Road, and Lavaque Road.

Miller Creek flows through Hermantown's northeast corner. Keene Creek flows through the southeast and east of the city. Kingsbury Creek briefly enters the south-central part of the city near Ugstad Road. Merritt Creek briefly enters Hermantown's southeast corner. Rocky Run flows through the northwest and west-central parts of the city.

The Midway River rises in Hermantown and flows generally southwest through the city's central and southwest portions before entering Midway Township. The Midway River flows into the Saint Louis River in Thomson Township near Cloquet.

Seville Road runs east–west along Hermantown's northern boundary with Canosia Township in northwest and north–central Hermantown. Solway Road runs north–south along Hermantown's western boundary line with Solway Township. Saint Louis River Road runs east–west along Hermantown's southern boundary line with Midway Township in southwest Hermantown. Haines Road runs north–south along Hermantown's eastern boundary line with Duluth.

Duluth International Airport is immediately northeast of Hermantown. The Pike Lake Business District of Canosia Township is immediately northwest of the city. The city of Proctor is immediately south of Hermantown. The Bayview Heights neighborhood of Duluth is immediately southeast of the city. The Piedmont Heights and Duluth Heights neighborhoods of Duluth are both immediately east of Hermantown.

== Demographics ==
Historical population
Census	Pop.	Note	%±
1980	6,759		—
1990	6,761		0.0%
2000	7,448		10.2%
2010	9,414		26.4%
2020	10,221		8.6%
2022 (est.)	10,126		−0.9%
U.S. Decennial Census; 2020 Census

=== 2020 census ===
As of the 2020 census, Hermantown had a population of 10,221. The median age was 41.0 years. 22.6% of residents were under the age of 18 and 19.2% of residents were 65 years of age or older. For every 100 females there were 104.7 males, and for every 100 females age 18 and over there were 106.0 males age 18 and over.

47.4% of residents lived in urban areas and 52.6% in rural areas.

There were 3,696 households in Hermantown, of which 30.8% had children under the age of 18 living in them. Of all households, 57.6% were married-couple households, 15.3% were households with a male householder and no spouse or partner present, and 21.4% were households with a female householder and no spouse or partner present. About 24.1% of all households were made up of individuals and 12.7% had someone living alone who was 65 years of age or older.

There were 3,867 housing units, of which 4.4% were vacant. The homeowner vacancy rate was 1.1% and the rental vacancy rate was 3.0%.

Racial composition as of the 2020 census
Race	Number	Percent
White	9,219	90.2%
Black or African American	191	1.9%
American Indian and Alaska Native	94	0.9%
Asian	156	1.5%
Native Hawaiian and Other Pacific Islander	2	0.0%
Some other race	65	0.6%
Two or more races	494	4.8%
Hispanic or Latino (of any race)	190	1.9%

=== 2010 census ===
As of the census of 2010, there were 9,414 people, 3,355 households, and 2,351 families living in the city. The population density was 274.1 inhabitants per square mile (105.8/km^{2}). There were 3,544 housing units at an average density of 103.2 per square mile (39.8/km^{2}). The racial makeup of the city was 93.1% White, 2.4% African American, 1.2% Native American, 1.2% Asian, 0.5% from other races, and 1.6% from two or more races. Hispanic or Latino of any race were 2.2% of the population.

There were 3,355 households, of which 33.1% had children under the age of 18 living with them, 58.4% were married couples living together, 7.5% had a female householder with no husband present, 4.2% had a male householder with no wife present, and 29.9% were non-families. 23.5% of all households were made up of individuals, and 12.5% had someone living alone who was 65 years of age or older. The average household size was 2.55 and the average family size was 3.01.

The median age in the city was 40.1 years. 22.6% of residents were under the age of 18; 8.2% were between the ages of 18 and 24; 26.5% were from 25 to 44; 28.9% were from 45 to 64; and 13.9% were 65 years of age or older. The gender makeup of the city was 54.0% male and 46.0% female.

=== 2000 census ===
As of the census of 2000, there were 7,448 people, 2,726 households, and 2,077 families living in the city. The population density was 216.9 inhabitants per square mile (83.7/km^{2}). There were 2,822 housing units at an average density of 82.2 per square mile (31.7/km^{2}). The racial makeup of the city was 97.27% White, 0.36% African American, 0.83% Native American, 0.47% Asian, 0.05% Pacific Islander, 0.11% from other races, and 0.90% from two or more races. Hispanic or Latino of any race were 0.63% of the population. 19.5% were of Norwegian, 15.9% German, 13.2% Swedish, 9.0% Finnish and 6.5% Irish ancestry.

There were 2,726 households, out of which 37.9% had children under the age of 18 living with them, 64.9% were married couples living together, 8.3% had a female householder with no husband present, and 23.8% were non-families. 19.8% of all households were made up of individuals, and 8.6% had someone living alone who was 65 years of age or older. The average household size was 2.67 and the average family size was 3.08.

In the city, the population was spread out, with 27.1% under the age of 18, 7.1% from 18 to 24, 28.4% from 25 to 44, 23.8% from 45 to 64, and 13.6% who were 65 years of age or older. The median age was 38 years. For every 100 females, there were 98.0 males. For every 100 females age 18 and over, there were 92.8 males.

The median income for a household in the city was $49,861, and the median income for a family was $55,632. Males had a median income of $41,152 versus $25,481 for females. The per capita income for the city was $20,993. About 2.2% of families and 4.1% of the population were below the poverty line, including 4.7% of those under age 18 and 5.0% of those age 65 or over.

== Politics ==
=== Presidential elections ===
Precinct Results
Year	Republican	Democratic	Third parties
2024	44.8% 2,727	53.2% 3,235	2.0% 122
2020	44.1% 2,623	54.1% 3,220	1.8% 106
2016	42.6% 2,266	49.5% 2,631	7.8% 417
2012	40.1% 2,083	58.2% 3,024	1.7% 93
2008	38.9% 1,903	59.6% 2,914	1.6% 74
2004	40.8% 1,878	58.3% 2,687	0.9% 40
2000	36.8% 1,442	58.3% 2,286	4.8% 191
1996	30.6% 1,006	57.5% 1,893	11.9% 392
1992	25.8% 834	51.1% 1,650	23.1% 745
1988	32.9% 974	67.1% 1,987	0.0% 0
1984	30.9% 935	69.1% 2,093	0.0% 0
1980	29.7% 899	60.6% 1,831	9.7% 293

== Transportation ==
=== Public Transit ===
- Arrowhead Transit

=== Major highways ===
- U.S. Highway 53
- Minnesota State Highway 194
- Saint Louis County Road 13 – Midway Road

== Notable person ==
- Pete Stauber, U.S. representative, former St. Louis County commissioner
