= Blackface (disambiguation) =

Blackface is a theatrical makeup to portray a stereotype of Black Africans.

Blackface may also refer to:

== Geographic places ==
- Black Face (valley), south wall of an east–west ridge in Arena Valley
- Blackface Mountain, a mountain in Alberta, Canada

== Music ==
- Blackface (album), by Shai
- Blackface Naija, or just Blackface, Nigerian dancehall, ragga and reggae singer and songwriter and former member of the Nigerian band Plantashun Boyz
- Black Face (band), an American hardcore punk band
- Fender Blackface Amplifiers

== Sheep ==
- Boreray Blackface, a breed of sheep
- Blackface Norfolk Horned, a breed of sheep
- Hebridean Blackface, a breed of sheep
- Scottish Blackface, a breed of sheep

== Other uses ==
- Ganguro, or Japanese Blackface, a Japanese fashion
- Kalamukhas sect of Kapalika
- The Black Face, a 1921 German silent film

== See also ==
- Blackwashing, the deliberate casting of black actors in non-black historical roles or contexts
