= Cotton, Minnesota =

Cotton
- Unincorporated community
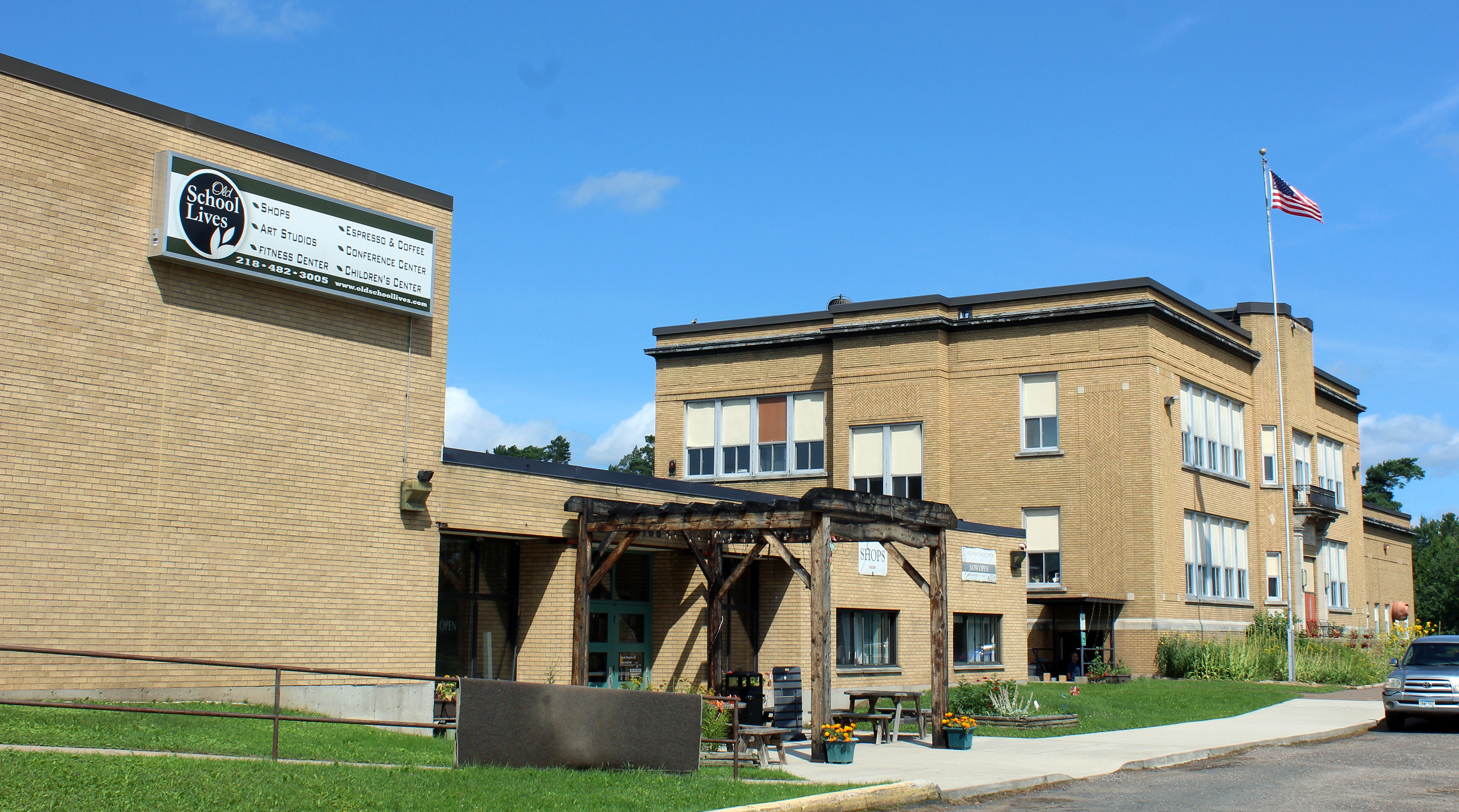
- Old School Lives, former Cotton School

- Location within Minnesota Location within the United States
- Coordinates: 47°10′10″N 92°28′35″W
- Country: United States
- State: Minnesota
- County: Saint Louis
- Township: Cotton Township
- Elevation: 1,329 ft (405 m)

Population
  - Total: 60
- Time zone: UTC-6 (Central (CST))
  - Summer (DST): UTC-5 (CDT)
- ZIP code: 55724
- Area code: 218
- GNIS feature ID: 661050

Cotton is an unincorporated community in Cotton Township, Saint Louis County, Minnesota, United States.

The community is located 36 miles (58 km) north of the city of Duluth at the junction of U.S. Highway 53 (U.S. 53) and Saint Louis County Road 52 (CR 52). Cotton is located 27 miles south of the city of Virginia.

Cotton is generally considered the half way point between the cities of Duluth and Virginia.

The Whiteface River flows through the community.

== Climate ==
The Köppen Climate Classification subtype for this climate is "Dfb" (Warm Summer Continental Climate). Cotton's weather is noteworthy for having the lowest recorded temperature in the lower 48 states in the last ten years, −56 °F (−48.9 °C), on January 31, 2019.

Climate data for Cotton, Minnesota, 1991–2020 normals, extremes 1962–present
Month	Jan	Feb	Mar	Apr	May	Jun	Jul	Aug	Sep	Oct	Nov	Dec	Year
Record high °F (°C)	52 (11)	59 (15)	72 (22)	87 (31)	93 (34)	96 (36)	100 (38)	100 (38)	97 (36)	85 (29)	72 (22)	59 (15)	100 (38)
Mean maximum °F (°C)	39.2 (4.0)	45.2 (7.3)	56.8 (13.8)	71.1 (21.7)	81.6 (27.6)	86.9 (30.5)	87.9 (31.1)	86.6 (30.3)	81.7 (27.6)	72.9 (22.7)	55.2 (12.9)	41.9 (5.5)	90.0 (32.2)
Mean daily maximum °F (°C)	18.2 (−7.7)	24.9 (−3.9)	36.9 (2.7)	50.4 (10.2)	63.7 (17.6)	73.0 (22.8)	77.8 (25.4)	75.5 (24.2)	67.2 (19.6)	52.2 (11.2)	36.5 (2.5)	24.2 (−4.3)	50.0 (10.0)
Daily mean °F (°C)	6.4 (−14.2)	10.5 (−11.9)	24.6 (−4.1)	37.5 (3.1)	50.8 (10.4)	60.6 (15.9)	64.9 (18.3)	62.8 (17.1)	55.3 (12.9)	41.9 (5.5)	27.2 (−2.7)	13.6 (−10.2)	38.0 (3.3)
Mean daily minimum °F (°C)	−5.5 (−20.8)	−3.9 (−19.9)	12.3 (−10.9)	24.6 (−4.1)	38.0 (3.3)	48.2 (9.0)	52.1 (11.2)	50.2 (10.1)	43.4 (6.3)	31.6 (−0.2)	17.9 (−7.8)	3.0 (−16.1)	26.0 (−3.3)
Mean minimum °F (°C)	−34.3 (−36.8)	−30.6 (−34.8)	−17.5 (−27.5)	7.7 (−13.5)	22.9 (−5.1)	30.8 (−0.7)	39.3 (4.1)	38.2 (3.4)	26.7 (−2.9)	15.3 (−9.3)	−5.9 (−21.1)	−27.1 (−32.8)	−37.3 (−38.5)
Record low °F (°C)	−56 (−49)	−56 (−49)	−40 (−40)	−14 (−26)	8 (−13)	24 (−4)	30 (−1)	23 (−5)	16 (−9)	−2 (−19)	−30 (−34)	−44 (−42)	−56 (−49)
Average precipitation inches (mm)	0.73 (19)	0.85 (22)	1.13 (29)	2.30 (58)	3.21 (82)	4.48 (114)	4.19 (106)	3.61 (92)	3.38 (86)	2.71 (69)	1.50 (38)	1.09 (28)	29.18 (743)
Average snowfall inches (cm)	7.9 (20)	6.3 (16)	5.4 (14)	2.8 (7.1)	0.0 (0.0)	0.0 (0.0)	0.0 (0.0)	0.0 (0.0)	0.0 (0.0)	1.4 (3.6)	10.6 (27)	8.8 (22)	43.2 (109.7)
Average extreme snow depth inches (cm)	14.5 (37)	17.2 (44)	14.3 (36)	5.4 (14)	0.1 (0.25)	0.0 (0.0)	0.0 (0.0)	0.0 (0.0)	0.0 (0.0)	0.4 (1.0)	5.8 (15)	8.9 (23)	18.3 (46)
Average precipitation days (≥ 0.01 in)	6.6	5.3	6.8	7.8	10.4	10.8	12.2	10.4	10.8	9.0	6.6	8.4	105.1
Average snowy days (≥ 0.1 in)	6.3	4.2	2.8	1.5	0.0	0.0	0.0	0.0	0.0	0.8	4.3	6.8	26.7
Source 1: NOAA
Source 2: National Weather Service

== See also ==
- Cotton School
