= List of county roads in St. Louis County, Minnesota =

- Standard county road markers

Highway names
- Interstates: Interstate X (I-X)
- US Highways: U.S. Highway X (US X)
- State: Trunk Highway X (MN X or TH X)
- County State-Aid Highways: County State-Aid Highway X (CSAH X)
- County Roads: County Road X (CR X)

System links
- County roads of Minnesota; St. Louis County

The following is a list of county routes in Saint Louis County, Minnesota, United States.

== CR 1–CR 20 ==
County Road 2 begins at the intersection of West Tischer Road with Rice Lake Road (CR 4), heads eastbound through the city of Rice Lake on West Tischer Road, and terminates at the intersection of West Tischer Road with Jean Duluth Road (CR 37). It is 5 miles (8 km) in length. County Road 2 is also known as West Tischer Road.

County Road 3 begins at the intersection of Becks Road and State Highway 23 (MN 23) in the city of Duluth and continues north and west in Midway Township, just past the intersection of Becks Road and Carlton County Road 61 where Becks Road becomes Stenman Road, and terminates at the Saint Louis / Carlton county line. It is 5 miles (8 km) in length.

County Road 3 is also known as Becks Road in the Duluth area and serves as a truck route. The axle weight limit on this route is 10 short tons (9 t).

County Road 4 (sometimes referred to as Highway 4 or County 4), begins at the intersection of Central Entrance (MN 194) and Rice Lake Road in Duluth and continues north to its northern terminus at Biwabik in the Iron Range region of Minnesota. The route is also known as Rice Lake Road in the city of Duluth, the city of Rice Lake, and Gnesen Township; and known as the historic Vermilion Trail from Island Lake to Biwabik. It is also officially designated Governor Rudy Perpich Memorial Drive.

County 4 is 60 miles (97 km) in length and passes through the communities of:

- Duluth
- Rice Lake
- Gnesen Township
- Markham
- Colvin Township
- White Township
- Biwabik Township
- Biwabik

County 4 serves as a north–south route between Duluth and Biwabik, and passes through the Cloquet Valley State Forest.

The southern terminus of County 4 is at the intersection of Rice Lake Road / Mesaba Avenue and Central Entrance (MN 194) in Duluth. The northern terminus of County 4 is at the intersection of Vermilion Trail and State Highway 135 (MN 135) in Biwabik.

County Road 5 (sometimes referred to as Highway 5 or County 5), begins at the intersection of County 5 and County 8 in Arrowhead Township and continues north to its northern terminus at the intersection of County 5 and West Olson Road (CR 114) near the St. Louis / Itasca county line (west of Cook). The section of County 5 in Ness Township, south of Meadowlands, is unpaved gravel surface.

County 5 passes through the communities of:

- Arrowhead Township
- Ness Township
- Meadowlands Township
- Meadowlands
- Elmer Township
- Toivola Township
- Toivola
- Lavell Township
- Hibbing
- Balkan Township (briefly)
- French Township
- Side Lake
- Morcom Township

McCarthy Beach State Park is located on the route. County 5 intersects U.S. Highway 169 at two different locations near Hibbing and Chisholm.

County Road 6 begins at the intersection of U.S. Highway 53 and Maple Grove Road in the city of Duluth and continues west to its western terminus in Brevator Township at the intersection of Maple Grove Road and State Highway 33 (MN 33). It is 13 miles (21 km) in length and passes through the communities of Duluth, Hermantown, Solway Township, and Brevator Township.

County Road 6 is also known as Maple Grove Road in the Duluth area.

Maple Grove Road serves as an east–west arterial route between U.S. Highway 53, Haines Road (CR 91), Lavaque Road (CR 48), Midway Road (CR 13), U.S. Highway 2, and State Highway 33 (MN 33).

County Road 7 (sometimes referred to as Highway 7 or County 7), begins at the intersection of U.S. Highway 53 and Industrial Road in Grand Lake Township and continues north to its northern terminus at the city of Mountain Iron in the Mesabi Range region. County 7 is also known as Industrial Road in Grand Lake Township and Industrial Township. The highway is officially designated the Bobby Aro Memorial Highway. Aro was an Iron Range radio personality and entertainer whose best known song is "Highway No. 7".

County 7 is 52 miles (84 km) in length and passes through the communities of:

- Grand Lake Township (Twig)
- Industrial Township
- Burnett
- Culver
- Alborn Township
- Meadowlands Township
- Payne
- Kelsey Township
- Sax
- Zim
- McDavitt Township
- Forbes
- Clinton Township
- Iron Junction
- Mountain Iron

County 7 serves as primarily a north–south route for most of its length. It changes direction to east–west as it approaches Industrial Township and continues as east–west to its terminus at Highway 53 in the community of Twig in Grand Lake Township. County 7 parallels Highway 53 for much of its route, and crosses the Saint Louis River near Forbes, the Whiteface River in Kelsey Township, and the Cloquet River in Industrial Township.

County Road 8 begins at the intersection of State Highway 73 (MN 73) and County 8 in Floodwood and continues east to its eastern terminus at the intersection of U.S. Highway 53 and County 8 in Grand Lake Township near Twig. County 8 serves as a direct route between Floodwood and U.S. Highway 53. County 8 also has an intersection with State Highway 33 (MN 33) in Industrial Township near Independence. The majority of the route is unpaved gravel surface.

County Road 9 begins at the intersection of Martin Road and Midway Road (CR 13) in Canosia Township (at Pike Lake) and continues east to the intersection of Calvary Road and Woodland Avenue in the Woodland business district in the city of Duluth.

County Road 9 is 11 miles (18 km) in length and passes through Canosia Township and the city of Rice Lake.

County Road 9 (concurrent with County Road 10) is also known as Martin Road in the Duluth area and serves as a truck route. Martin Road serves as an east–west arterial route between Midway Road and Jean Duluth Road (CR 37) on the northern edge of Duluth. The axle weight limit on this route is 9 short tons (8 t).

A non-arterial two mile extension of County Road 9 follows North Pike Lake Road, Helm Road, and Caribou Lake Road.

County Road 10 begins at the intersection of Arnold Road (CR 9 and CR 36) and Martin Road (CR 9) in the city of Rice Lake and continues the east–west arterial route served by County Road 9 eastbound to Jean Duluth Road (CR 37). This western segment of County Road 10 is 3.2 miles (5 km) in length. The eastern segment of County Road 10 begins at the intersection of Jean Duluth Road (CR 37) and West Tischer Road (CR 2), 1.2 miles (1.9 km) north of where the western segment of County Road 10 terminates. The eastern segment of County Road 10 heads eastbound on West Tischer Road in Lakewood Township for 2 miles (3.2 km), heads northbound on North Tischer Road for 0.5 miles (0.80 km), then heads eastbound on Strand Road for 1 mile (1.6 km), terminating at Lester River Road (CR 12).

County Road 11 is 3.4 miles (5.5 km) long. It begins at the intersection of Midway Road (CR 13) and Stark Road (CR 894) in Midway Township, heads eastbound on Stark Road, briefly heads southbound on Ugstad Road, heads eastbound through the city of Proctor on 4th Street, heads southbound on 5th Avenue North, then heads eastbound on 2nd Street, and terminates at Boundary Avenue (CR 14).

County Road 12 begins at the intersection of 60th Avenue East and East Superior Street in the Lakeside – Lester Park neighborhood of Duluth, heads eastbound on East Superior Street to 61st Avenue East, heads northbound on Lester River Road for 6.45 miles (10.38 km), heads eastbound on Roberg Road for 1 mile (1.6 km), heads northbound on Lakewood Road for 0.75 miles (1.21 km), and terminates at Lismore Road (CR 43) in Lakewood Township. The one block portion of County Road 12 following East Superior Street from 60th Avenue East to 61st Avenue East / Lester River Road is an unmarked county route within the city of Duluth.

County Road 13 begins at the intersection of Midway Road and Becks Road (CR 3) in Midway Township and continues north to its northern terminus in Canosia Township / Pike Lake at the intersection of Midway Road and Martin Road (CR 9).

County Road 13 is 11 miles (18 km) in length and passes through the communities of Midway Township, the city of Hermantown, and Canosia Township.

County Road 13 is also known as Midway Road in the Duluth area and serves as a truck route. Midway Road serves as a key north–south arterial route along Duluth's western outskirts. The axle weight limit on this route is 10 short tons (9 t). Midway Road carries approximately 9,000 vehicles per day as of 2011.

The southern terminus of County Road 13 is near its interchange with Interstate Highway 35 in Midway Township. Its northern terminus is near its intersection with U.S. Highway 53 in the Pike Lake district of Canosia Township.

County Road 14 begins at the intersection of Midway Road (CR 13) and Thompson Hill Road in Midway Township, heads northeast on Thompson Hill Road / Mountain Drive while paralleling on the south side of Interstate Highway 35, briefly turns onto Skyline Parkway, then heads northbound on Boundary Avenue that divides Duluth from Proctor, then heads westbound on 5th Street in Proctor, terminating at its intersection with U.S. Highway 2.

County Road 15 begins at the intersection of Munger Shaw Road and U.S. Highway 53 in Grand Lake Township. The southern segment of County Road 15 heads northbound on Munger Shaw Road and terminates at the intersection of Taft Road (CR 48) and Munger Shaw Road (CR 223), located immediately south of Taft. The northern segment of County Road 15 begins at the intersection of Munger Shaw Road (CR 223) with Three Lakes Road (CR 49), heads northbound into Shaw, and terminates at its intersection with Comstock Lake Road (CR 52 and CR 547) located immediately east of Whiteface.

County Road 16 (sometimes referred to as Highway 16 or County 16), begins at the county line with Itasca County near Bengal; immediately southwest of Hibbing and near State Highway 73 (MN 73); and continues east to its eastern terminus at the county line with Lake County near Fairbanks.

County Road 16 is 64 miles (103 km) in length and passes through the communities of Bengal, Forbes, Peary, Makinen, Fairbanks, and Bassett. It serves as an east–west route between Fairbanks and the Hibbing area, and is also known as Townline Road and Wilson Road at various points throughout its route.

County 16 parallels State Highway 37 (MN 37) for part of its route.

County Road 17 is a short service route to the Duluth International Airport and the Federal Prison Camp located next to the airport. The route begins at the intersection of Arrowhead Road (CR 32) and Airbase Road, heads northwest along Airbase Road, then heads southbound on Airport Approach Road and Stebner Road, and terminates at the intersection of U.S. Highway 53 and Stebner Road.

County Road 20 begins at its intersection with Vermilion Trail (CR 4), near Bass Lake west of Palo, the route heads west and then north into McKinley, and terminates at its intersection with Main Street in McKinley. County 20 is also known as Heritage Trail. The route is 7 miles in length. County 20 intersects State Highway 135 (MN 135) at McKinley, between Gilbert and Biwabik.

== CR 21–CR 40 ==
County Road 21 (sometimes referred to as Highway 21 or County 21), is a route in the northern portion of the county, serving Pike Township, Embarrass Township, Embarrass, Waasa Township, Babbitt, Morse Township, and Ely. The route begins at its intersection with State Highway 169 (MN 169), near where Highway 169 crosses the Pike River, heads east and north for 40 miles (64 km), enters Ely on Central Avenue, and terminates at its intersection with Sheridan Street (MN 169 / MN 1).

County Road 22 (sometimes referred to as Highway 22 or County 22), is a route in the northern portion of the county, serving Bear River, Morcom Township, Sturgeon Township, Alango Township, and Sherman Corner. The route begins in Bear River as Itasca County Road 22 becomes Saint Louis County Road 22, heads east for approximately 20 miles (32 km) and terminates in Sherman Corner at the county road's intersection with U.S. Highway 53 and State Highway 1 (MN 1). Until 1996, Itasca and Saint Louis County Roads 22 were Highway 1; and Highway 1 located 6 miles (9.7 km) north paralleling the county roads was the Itasca and Saint Louis County Roads 22.

County Road 23 is a route in the northern portion of the county, serving Nett Lake, the Nett Lake Indian Reservation, Orr, Leiding Township, Portage Township, and Buyck. The 35.7 miles (57.5 km) route begins on Nett Lake Road in Nett Lake, heads east out of the Indian Reservation to Glendale, heads concurrently north with U.S. Highway 53 (Johnson Parkway) into Orr, heads east on Orr–Buyck Road out of Orr, and terminates at its intersection with Crane Lake Road (CR 24) in Buyck. The portion of County Road 23 within the Nett Lake Indian Reservation was formerly designated as County Road 793.

County Road 24 is a route in the northern portion of the county, serving Cook, Owens Township, Beatty Township, Portage Township, Buyck, and Crane Lake. The 43.4 miles (69.8 km) route begins at the intersection on U.S. Highway 53 and 2nd Street Southeast in Cook, heads north on 2nd Street Southeast, briefly heads east on Vermilion Drive, then continues north on Vermilion Drive, heads out of Cook and generally continues to head north and east on Vermilion Road, heads east on Kallo Road, heads north on Crane Lake Road, and terminates along Gold Coast Road in Crane Lake. The central portion of the route is unpaved gravel surface from Buyck southbound towards Wakemup.

County Road 25 (sometimes referred to as Highway 25 or County 25), is a route in the western portion of the county, serving McDavitt Township, Lavell Township, Clinton Township, Cherry Township, Cherry, Great Scott Township, Kinney, Alango Township, Field Township, and Cook; it also serves portions of the Superior National Forest. The route begins at the intersection of Zim Road (CR 27) and Fraser Road near Zim, generally heads north for 47.3 miles (76.1 km) into Cook, and terminates on Vermilion Drive at its intersection with 2nd Street Southeast (CR 24). County 25 also passes near Buhl and Chisholm at its intersection with U.S. Highway 169 in Great Scott Township.

County Road 26 is a route in the northern portion of the county, serving Embarrass Township, Kugler Township, Wahlsten, and Vermilion Lake Township. The 11.6 miles (18.7 km) route begins at the intersection of County Road 21 and Wahlsten Road near Embarrass, generally heads north and west through Wahlsten, and terminates at its intersection with State Highway 169 (MN 169). County 26 is also known as Wahlsten Road.

County Road 27 is a route in the northern portion of the county, serving Hibbing, Lavell Township, McDavitt Township, and Zim. The 10 miles (16 km) route begins at the intersection of County Road 5 and Zim Road near the southeastern corner of Hibbing, generally heads east on Zim Road to Zim, and terminates at its intersection with County Road 7.

County Road 28 is a route in the southwestern portion of the county, serving Sax, McDavitt Township, and Lavell Township. The route begins at its intersection with County Road 7 in Sax, heads west 3.7 miles (6.0 km) on Sax Road, heads north 0.5 miles (0.80 km) on Dass Road, heads west 2 miles (3.2 km) and terminates at its intersection with Overton Road (CR 83).

County Road 29 is a route in the southwestern portion of the county, serving Van Buren Township, Ness Township, Meadowlands Township, Meadowlands, Toivola Township, and Kelsey Township. The 26 miles (42 km) route begins 1 mile (1.6 km) north of Floodwood at its intersection with State Highway 73 (MN 73), heads east and north through Meadowlands and terminates 0.5 miles (0.80 km) south of Kelsey at its intersection with County Road 7.

County Road 31 (sometimes referred to as Highway 31 or County 31) starts at the Carlton County line at County 9 and travels north as Twin Lakes Drive. At Stoney Brook Township, it slightly overlaps with U.S. Route 2 for 4/10 of a mile until it goes north through Brookston and curves east as Lamb Road. Lamb Road then becomes its own separate county road (CR 866) and CR 31 veers north again. It ends at County Road 8 in Culver Township. The route is about 12 miles in length.

County Road 32 begins at the intersection of U.S. Highway 53 and Arrowhead Road in Hermantown and continues east to its eastern terminus at the intersection of Arrowhead Road and Arlington Avenue (CR 90) in Duluth.

County Road 32 is 2.5 miles (4.0 km) in length and passes through the communities of Hermantown and Duluth.

County Road 32 is also known as Arrowhead Road in the Duluth area. Arrowhead Road serves as an east–west arterial route between Hermantown, the Miller Hill area of Duluth, and eastern Duluth. Arrowhead Road in Duluth and Hermantown is actually 9 miles (14 km) in length; however, only 2.5 miles is designated and signed as County Road 32.

County Road 37 begins at the intersection of Glenwood Street and Jean Duluth Road in the city of Duluth and continues north to its northern terminus at Normanna Road (CR 44) in Normanna Township.

County Road 37 is also known as Jean Duluth Road in the Duluth area and passes through the communities of Lakewood Township, Normanna Township, and the city of Duluth.

Jean Duluth Road serves as a north–south arterial route between Glenwood Street, Martin Road (CR 9/CR 10), and Normanna Road.

== CR 41–CR 60 ==

County Road 48 is more commonly known as Lavaque Road in the Duluth area and serves as a north–south arterial route. It is 15 miles (24 km) in length and passes through the communities of Proctor, Hermantown, Canosia Township, and Fredenberg Township.

The first section of County Road 48 runs from the intersection of Second Avenue (Lavaque Road) and U.S. Highway 2 in the city of Proctor and continues north to the intersection of Lavaque Road and U.S. Highway 53 in the city of Hermantown. The second section runs from the intersection of Lavaque Bypass Road and Highway 53 in the city of Hermantown and continues north to the intersection of Lavaque Road and Fish Lake Road in Fredenberg Township. The third section of County 48 is a non-arterial 4-mile (6.4 km) route following Fish Lake Road and Taft Road.

The southern terminus of County Road 48 is the intersection of Second Avenue and U.S. Highway 2 in the city of Proctor. The northern terminus is at the intersection of Taft Road and County Road 15 in the community of Taft in Grand Lake Township.

County Road 49 runs from the intersection of County 49 and U.S. Highway 53 in Northland Township (near Canyon) and continues east to its eastern terminus at the intersection of County Road 49 and County Road 4 (near Island Lake). County Road 49 passes through the Three Lakes Area and the community of Shaw. County 49 is also known as Three Lakes Road. The majority of the route is unpaved gravel surface.

County Road 52 runs from the intersection of County Road 52 and County Road 5 in Toivola and continues east to its eastern terminus at the intersection of County Road 52 / County Road 15 / County Road 547 near Whiteface and Shaw.

County Road 52 is known as Arkola Road between Toivola and its intersection with U.S. Highway 53 at Cotton. County Road 52 is also known as Comstock Lake Road between Cotton and its eastern terminus near Shaw. The route is 36 miles (57.93 km) in length.

County Road 56 runs from the intersection of Morris Thomas Road and Piedmont Avenue in the city of Duluth and continues west to its western terminus in Brevator Township at the intersection of Morris Thomas Road and State Highway 33 (MN 33).

County Road 56 is 14 miles (23 km) in length and passes through the communities of Duluth, Hermantown, Solway Township, and Brevator Township. This route is also known as Morris Thomas Road in the Duluth area.

Morris Thomas Road serves as an east–west arterial route between Piedmont Avenue, Haines Road (CR 91), Lavaque Road (CR 48), U.S. Highway 2, Midway Road (CR 13), and State Highway 33 (MN 33).

County Road 58 runs from State Highway 169 (MN 169) near Winton and continues southeasterly to the Saint Louis / Lake County Line. County 58 is also known as Kawishiwi Trail.

== CR 61–CR 80 ==

County Road 61 runs from the intersection of Congdon Boulevard and the Minnesota 61 Expressway near Brighton Beach in Duluth and follows the North Shore Scenic Drive to Two Harbors.

County Road 61 passes through the communities of Duluth Township (French River and Palmers) and the city of Duluth. It is more commonly known and signed as North Shore Scenic Drive between Duluth and Two Harbors. This stretch of County Road 61 is also known as Scenic 61.

Between Duluth and Two Harbors, what is now County Road 61 was commissioned as U.S. 61 in 1926, ready for use by 1929, and paved by 1940. Until the expressway between Duluth and Two Harbors was constructed inland in the 1960s, County Road 61 (then U.S. 61) had served as the principal route between Duluth and Two Harbors. The state turned over management of the road to Saint Louis and Lake Counties in the 1960s, and the two counties then designated this route County Road 61.

The course for Grandma's Marathon follows this road route annually in June.

== CR 81–CR 100 ==

County Road 90 runs from the intersection of U.S. Highway 53 and Arlington Avenue in Duluth and continues north to its northern terminus at the intersection of Arlington Avenue and Arrowhead Road (CR 32) in Duluth.

County Road 90 is 3 miles (4.8 km) in length and is an arterial route in the Duluth Heights neighborhood of Duluth. County 90 is also known as Arlington Avenue in Duluth.

County Road 91 runs from the intersection of 40th Avenue West and West 8th Street in Duluth and continues north to its northern terminus at the intersection of Haines Road and Airport Road in Duluth.

County Road 91 is 6 miles (9.7 km) in length and passes through the communities of Duluth and Hermantown. The road actually serves as a boundary line between the two cities for much of its length.

County Road 91 is more commonly known as Haines Road in the Duluth area and serves as an arterial route. A small section of County Road 91 is known as 40th Avenue West.

Haines Road serves as an arterial route between West Duluth, Hermantown, and the Miller Hill area of Duluth.

As of 2011, the section of Haines Road between Morris Thomas Road and Skyline Parkway carries approximately 7,000 vehicles per day, on average. A $12 million reconstruction project of this section of roadway began in September 2012 and was completed in October 2013. Crews added curb and gutter along a newly constructed roadway, which should help prevent the kind of washouts and mudslides that left sections of the roadway temporarily closed after the June 2012 Duluth flood. This section of Haines Road now has wide shoulders, two uphill lanes, a wider downhill lane, and a sidewalk. A 300-foot-long culvert along Merritt Creek was also installed.

During the 2012–2013 reconstruction project, the roadway's notorious hairpin "horseshoe bend" section, as locals call it, on the 40th Avenue West segment of County Road 91, was straightened some, but could not be eliminated because of the steep nature of the hill, and the lack of additional funding that would have been required for an expensive project of blasting rock on the hillside.

County Road 92 runs from the intersection of County 92 / U.S. 169 / MN 73 at the northeast side of Hibbing and continues east to its eastern terminus at the intersection of County 92 and County 25 in Cherry. The route is 8 miles (12.87 km) in length.

County Road 93 runs from the intersection of County 93 and U.S. Highway 53 at Central Lakes and continues east to its eastern terminus at the intersection of County 93 and County 16 in Makinen. The route is 6.7 miles (10.78 km) in length.

County 93 is sometimes used as a shortcut between U.S. 53 at Central Lakes and County 16 at Makinen to reach Palo and Aurora (via County 16 and County 100).

County Road 100 runs from the intersection of County 100 and County Road 4 near Makinen and Palo and continues north to its northern terminus at the intersection of County 100 and State Highway 135 (MN 135) in Aurora. County 100 passes through Palo. The route is 12 miles in length.

== CR 101 and up ==

County Road 102 is a route in Mountain Iron that runs from its southern terminus at County 7 to U.S. Highway 53, near the northern terminus of U.S. Highway 169.

County Road 110 runs from its western terminus at its intersection with County Road 100 in Aurora, and its eastern terminus is at its intersection with County Road 16 near Fairbanks. County 110 is 14 miles in length. The city of Hoyt Lakes is located along the route. County 110 also passes by Bird Lake Recreation Area and the community of Skibo.

County Road 133 (sometimes referred to as Highway 133 or County 133) runs from US Highway 53 in Northland Township and travels 28 miles west to the Itasca County line at Itasca County Road 25, passing through Meadowlands along the way. It overlaps with State Highway 73 (MN 73) for a small portion of its route.

County Road 303 runs from its southern terminus at its intersection with State Highway 169 (MN 169) and passes through the unincorporated area of Britt. It is a bypass route to Britt and a shortcut to Wuori Township. The L-shaped route of CR 303 follows Trillium Road, Rice River Road and Hill Road; and passes through Wuori Township, Sandy Township, and briefly enters Pike Township, where it meets again with Highway 169.
