= Meadowlands, Minnesota =

City in Minnesota, United States

Meadowlands
- City
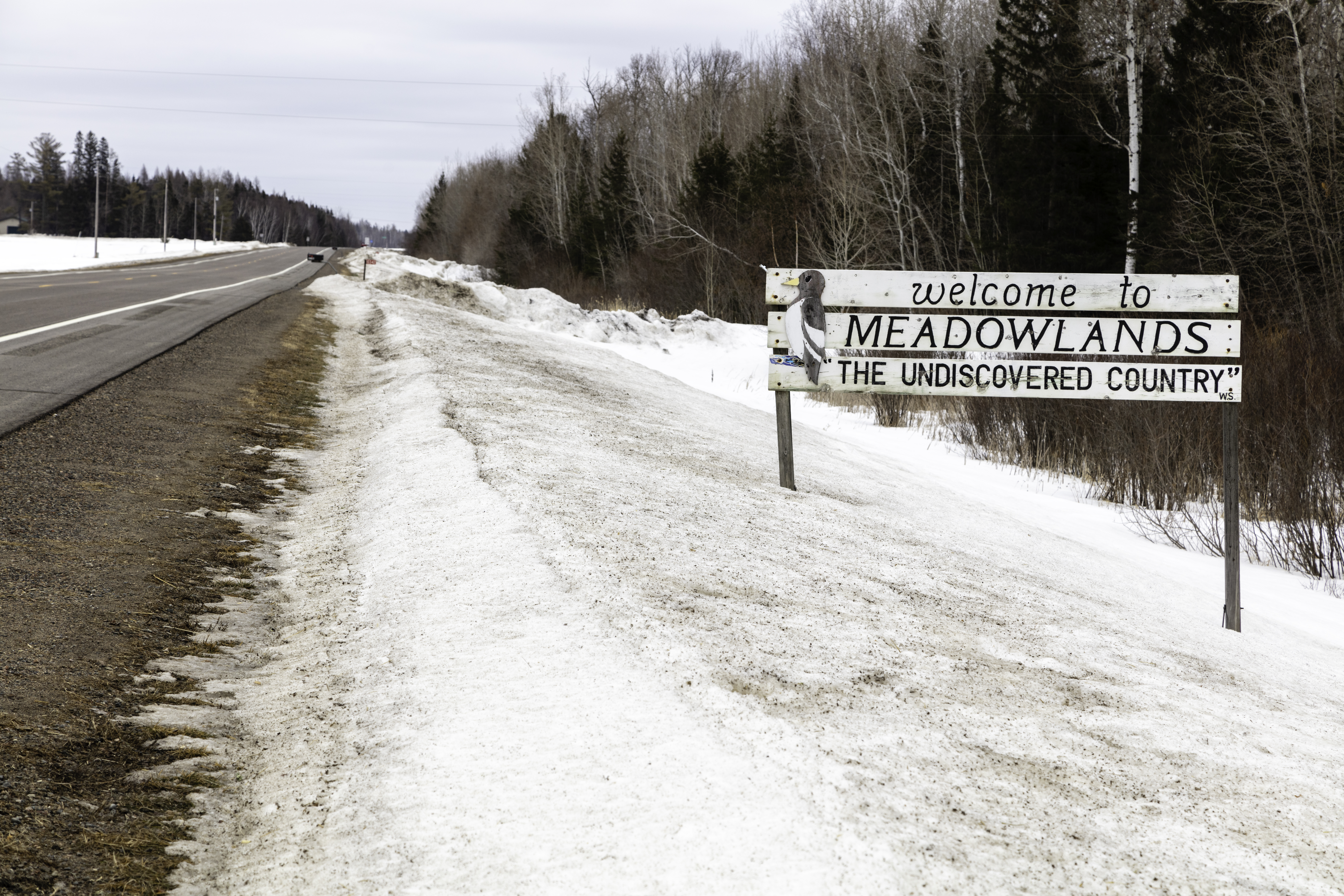
- Welcome to Meadowlands sign

- Location of the city of Meadowlands within Saint Louis County, Minnesota
- Coordinates: 47°4′22″N 92°43′54″W
- Country: United States
- State: Minnesota
- County: Saint Louis

Area
  - Total: 0.39 sq mi (1.00 km^{2})
  - Land: 0.39 sq mi (1.00 km^{2})
  - Water: 0 sq mi (0.00 km^{2})
- Elevation: 1,276 ft (389 m)

Population (2020)
  - Total: 134
  - Density: 347.2/sq mi (134.07/km^{2})
- Time zone: UTC-6 (Central (CST))
  - Summer (DST): UTC-5 (CDT)
- ZIP codes: 55765
- Area code: 218
- FIPS code: 27-41372
- GNIS feature ID: 0661897

Meadowlands is a city in Saint Louis County, Minnesota, United States. The population was 134 at the 2020 census.

Saint Louis County Highway 133 (CR 133), County 5 (CR 5), and County 29 (CR 29) are three of the main routes in Meadowlands.

== History ==
Meadowlands, as its name would suggest, is one of the few areas of arable land in Saint Louis County. While Meadowlands prospered and grew due to the support it provided to the region's farms, the steady decline in those same farms (and the large families they supported) during the mid-late 1980s and early 1990s heralded the beginning of the town's gradual decline.

During its heyday, Meadowlands was home to a number of businesses including a Ford dealership (which also carried New Holland farm machinery), a bank, a farmer's cooperative store, a grocery store, a commercial laundry, a cheese factory, various restaurants, a movie theater and the Toivola–Meadowlands School, a K–12 institution. However, the loss of the large farm families gradually reduced the student population until Independent School District 710 chose to close the school. An attempt was made to convert T–M into a "Charter School", but it ultimately proved unsuccessful. Before closing, the school sent its 9-man football team to the Minnesota State Finals twice in the 1980s.

Currently it possesses only a single bar/grill establishment, and four places of worship.

The retail and service related facilities have seen a slight increase in business due to the recent expansion of tourism related to bird-watching. The rivers, lakes, fields and arboreal bog areas around Meadowlands offer visitors the opportunity to view species ranging from small song birds, such as the waxwing, to Bald Eagles.

Also winter brings with it increased snowmobile traffic, as a former Duluth, Missabe and Iron Range Railroad line runs along the eastern edge of the town. Now converted to an ATV–snowmobile trail, this former rail line runs from Alborn in the south, north to Pengilly on the Iron Range.

== Geography ==
According to the United States Census Bureau, the city has a total area of 0.39 square miles (1.01 km^{2}), all land.

== Demographics ==
Historical population
Census	Pop.	Note	%±
1930	121		—
1940	142		17.4%
1950	134		−5.6%
1960	176		31.3%
1970	128		−27.3%
1980	135		5.5%
1990	92		−31.9%
2000	111		20.7%
2010	134		20.7%
2020	134		0.0%
U.S. Decennial Census

=== 2010 census ===
As of the census of 2010, there were 134 people, 67 households, and 33 families living in the city. The population density was 343.6 inhabitants per square mile (132.7/km^{2}). There were 78 housing units at an average density of 200.0 per square mile (77.2/km^{2}). The racial makeup of the city was 94.0% White, 3.7% African American, 0.7% Native American, and 1.5% from two or more races.

There were 67 households, of which 23.9% had children under the age of 18 living with them, 29.9% were married couples living together, 16.4% had a female householder with no husband present, 3.0% had a male householder with no wife present, and 50.7% were non-families. 50.7% of all households were made up of individuals, and 32.9% had someone living alone who was 65 years of age or older. The average household size was 2.00 and the average family size was 2.82.

The median age in the city was 47 years. 23.9% of residents were under the age of 18; 9% were between the ages of 18 and 24; 14.9% were from 25 to 44; 25.4% were from 45 to 64; and 26.9% were 65 years of age or older. The gender makeup of the city was 43.3% male and 56.7% female.

=== 2000 census ===
As of the census of 2000, there were 111 people, 53 households, and 28 families living in the city. The population density was 291.1 inhabitants per square mile (112.4/km^{2}). There were 61 housing units at an average density of 159.9 per square mile (61.7/km^{2}). The racial makeup of the city was 97.30% White and 2.70% Native American. 24.7% were of German, 9.6% Finnish, 9.6% Norwegian, 8.2% Czech, 6.8% Slovak and 5.5% Italian ancestry.

There were 53 households, out of which 22.6% had children under the age of 18 living with them, 41.5% were married couples living together, 11.3% had a female householder with no husband present, and 45.3% were non-families. 37.7% of all households were made up of individuals, and 34.0% had someone living alone who was 65 years of age or older. The average household size was 2.09 and the average family size was 2.72.

In the city, the population was spread out, with 23.4% under the age of 18, 1.8% from 18 to 24, 32.4% from 25 to 44, 10.8% from 45 to 64, and 31.5% who were 65 years of age or older. The median age was 42 years. For every 100 females, there were 82.0 males. For every 100 females age 18 and over, there were 77.1 males.

The median income for a household in the city was $20,625, and the median income for a family was $23,750. Males had a median income of $35,000 versus $23,750 for females. The per capita income for the city was $11,682. There were 3.7% of families and 14.0% of the population living below the poverty line, including 16.0% of under eighteens and 26.9% of those over 64.

== Arts and culture ==
Meadowlands is near "Sax–Zim Bog" which is home to some of the world's best winter birdwatching, including resident Great Gray Owls. It was named for the two nearby communities of Sax and Zim. Birders visit this region from around the United States. The Friends of Sax-Zim Bog has a Welcome Center which is open from early December to March, and then again in early summer for the period of warbler nesting.
