= Potshot Lake, Minnesota =

Unorganized territory in Saint Louis County, Minnesota, United States

Coordinates: 46°58′37″N 92°59′44″W

- Unorganized territory
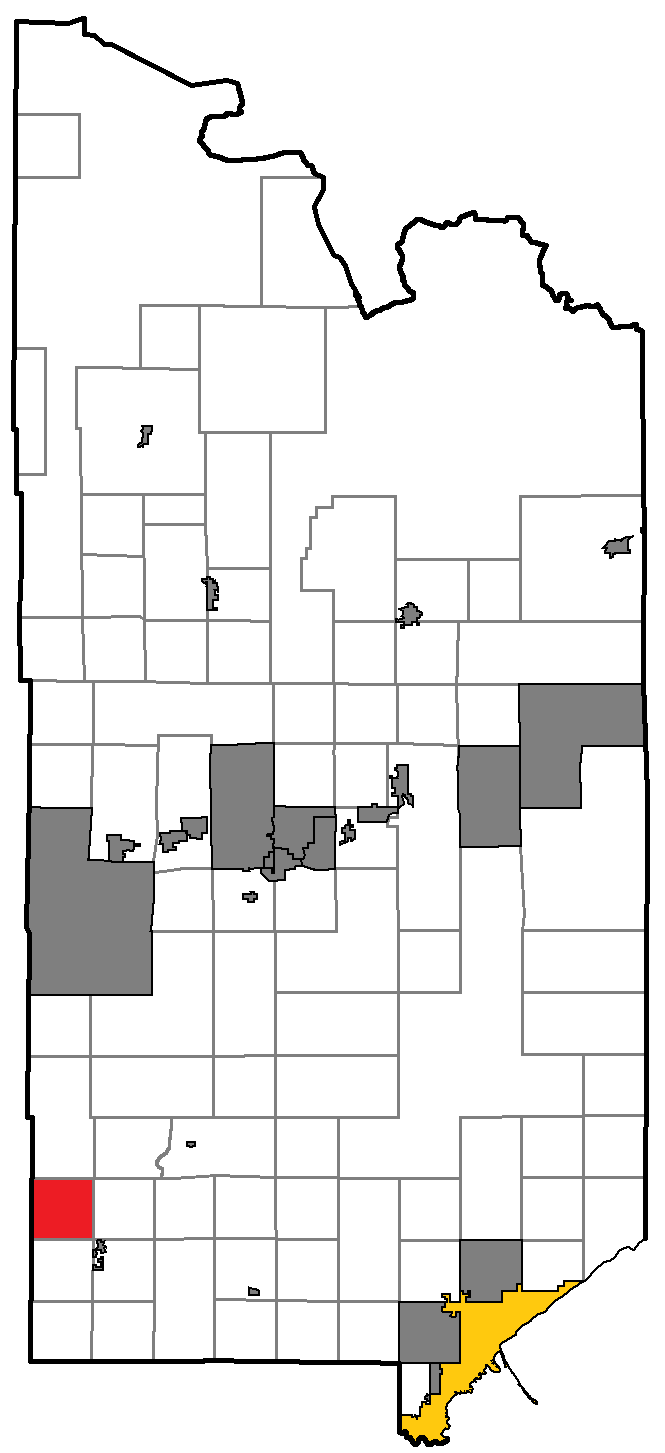
- Location of Potshot Lake within St. Louis County, Minnesota
- Country: United States
- State: Minnesota
- County: St. Louis

Area
  - Total: 35.55 sq mi (92.1 km^{2})
  - Land: 35.50 sq mi (91.9 km^{2})
  - Water: 0.05 sq mi (0.13 km^{2})

Population (2020)
  - Total: 65
  - Density: 1.8/sq mi (0.71/km^{2})
- Time zone: UTC-6 (Central (CST))
  - Summer (DST): UTC-5 (CDT)
- Area code: 218

Potshot Lake is an unorganized territory in Saint Louis County, Minnesota, United States, located near Floodwood. The population was 65 at the 2020 census.

== Geography ==
According to the United States Census Bureau, the unorganized territory has a total area of 35.6 square miles (92.1 km^{2}); 35.5 square miles (92.0 km^{2}) is land and 0.1 square mile (0.1 km^{2}) (0.14%) is water.

== Demographics ==
At the 2000 United States census there were 73 people, 25 households, and 17 families living in the unorganized territory. The population density was 2.1 inhabitants per square mile (0.81/km^{2}). There were 36 housing units at an average density of 1.0 per square mile (0.39/km^{2}). The racial makeup of the unorganized territory was 95.89% White, 1.37% Native American, 1.37% Asian, and 1.37% from two or more races. Hispanic or Latino of any race were 2.74%.

Of the 25 households 44.0% had children under the age of 18 living with them, 52.0% were married couples living together, 8.0% had a female householder with no husband present, and 32.0% were non-families. 24.0% of households were one person and 4.0% were one person aged 65 or older. The average household size was 2.92 and the average family size was 3.71.

The age distribution was 35.6% under the age of 18, 4.1% from 18 to 24, 23.3% from 25 to 44, 28.8% from 45 to 64, and 8.2% 65 or older. The median age was 36 years. For every 100 females, there were 87.2 males. For every 100 females age 18 and over, there were 95.8 males.

The median household income was $49,375 and the median family income was $53,750. Males had a median income of $44,583 versus $21,875 for females. The per capita income for the unorganized territory was $16,216. There were 4.5% of families and 4.3% of the population living below the poverty line, including 3.3% of under eighteens and 14.3% of those over 64.
