= Janette Lake, Minnesota =

Unorganized territory in St. Louis County, Minnesota, United States

Coordinates: 47°14′18″N 93°01′07″W

- Unorganized territory
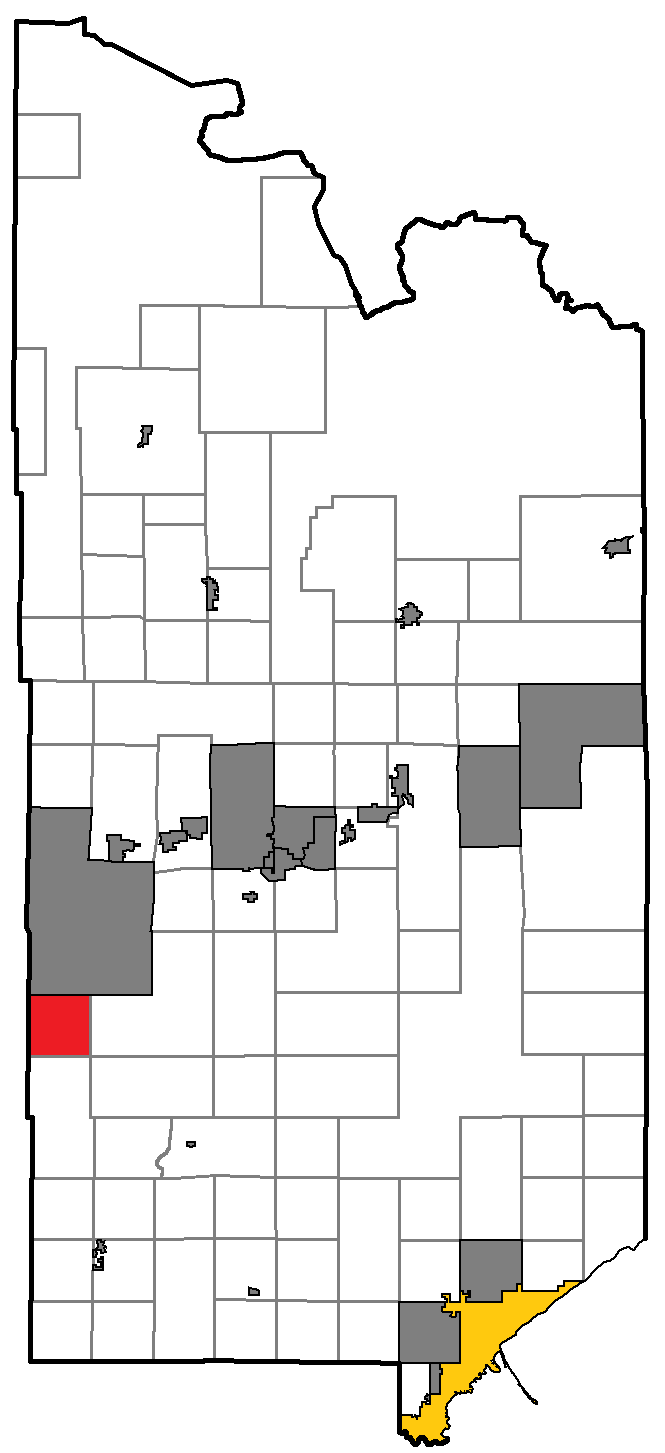
- Location of Janette Lake within St. Louis County, Minnesota
- Country: United States
- State: Minnesota
- County: St. Louis

Area
  - Total: 36.13 sq mi (93.6 km^{2})
  - Land: 34.68 sq mi (89.8 km^{2})
  - Water: 1.45 sq mi (3.8 km^{2})

Population (2020)
  - Total: 294
  - Density: 8.48/sq mi (3.27/km^{2})
- Time zone: UTC-6 (Central (CST))
  - Summer (DST): UTC-5 (CDT)
- Area code: 218

Janette Lake is an unorganized territory in Saint Louis County, Minnesota, United States. The population was 294 at the 2020 census.

State Highway 73 (MN 73) serves as a main route in the area.

The unincorporated communities of Silica and Bengal are located within Janette Lake Unorganized Territory.

Janet Lake Wayside Park is located in the area.

== Geography ==
According to the United States Census Bureau, the unorganized territory has a total area of 36.2 square miles (93.7 km^{2}), of which 34.7 square miles (89.8 km^{2}) is land and 1.5 square miles (3.9 km^{2}) (4.12%) is water. The lake itself is approximately 612 acres in size and about 15 feet deep at its deepest point.

== Demographics ==
At the 2000 census there were 249 people, 105 households, and 84 families living in the unorganized territory. The population density was 7.2 inhabitants per square mile (2.8/km^{2}). There were 136 housing units at an average density of 3.9 per square mile (1.5/km^{2}). The racial makeup of the unorganized territory was 98.39% White, 0.40% Native American, and 1.20% from two or more races. Of the 105 households 20.0% had children under the age of 18 living with them, 72.4% were married couples living together, 3.8% had a female householder with no husband present, and 20.0% were non-families. 13.3% of households were one person and 2.9% were one person aged 65 or older. The average household size was 2.37 and the average family size was 2.58.

The age distribution was 16.5% under the age of 18, 4.4% from 18 to 24, 19.3% from 25 to 44, 44.6% from 45 to 64, and 15.3% 65 or older. The median age was 48 years. For every 100 females, there were 104.1 males. For every 100 females age 18 and over, there were 98.1 males.

The median household income was $43,304 and the median family income was $44,464. Males had a median income of $45,469 versus $30,313 for females. The per capita income for the unorganized territory was $19,521. About 6.5% of families and 13.3% of the population were below the poverty line, including 21.3% of those under the age of eighteen and none of those sixty five or over.
