= Whiteface River (Minnesota) =

- Mouth of the Whiteface River

Location
- Country: United States
- State: Minnesota
- County: St. Louis County

Physical characteristics
- Source
  - location: Whiteface Reservoir
  - coordinates: 47.2813186°N 92.187682°W
- Mouth
  - coordinates: 46°58′45″N 92°48′41″W
- Length: 64.4 mi-long (103.6 km)

Basin features
- Progression: Whiteface River→ St. Louis River→ Lake Superior
- River system: Saint Louis River

The Whiteface River is a 64.4-mile-long (103.6 km) tributary of the Saint Louis River in Saint Louis County, Minnesota, United States.

It begins at the outlet of Whiteface Reservoir near Markham and flows southwest, joining the Saint Louis River northeast of the city of Floodwood.

The river is used for recreational paddling. Users should be aware there are no formal bathroom facilities along the river.

== See also ==
- List of rivers of Minnesota
- List of longest streams of Minnesota
