= Bengal, Minnesota =

Unincorporated community in Minnesota, United States

Bengal
- Unincorporated community
- Location within Minnesota Location within the United States
- Coordinates: 47°16′06″N 93°03′55″W
- Country: United States
- State: Minnesota
- County: Saint Louis
- Elevation: 1,352 ft (412 m)

Population
  - Total: 10
- Time zone: UTC-6 (Central (CST))
  - Summer (DST): UTC-5 (CDT)
- ZIP code: 55746
- Area code: 218
- GNIS feature ID: 654598

Bengal was an unincorporated community on the boundary of Itasca County and Saint Louis County, Minnesota, United States, located about three hours north of Minneapolis. Bengal was also previously known as Powers.

Founded on a line of the Great Northern Railway adjacent to Lake Bengal, Bengal was platted in 1914 and was a farming and mining community.

== Geography ==
The community was located immediately southwest of the city of Hibbing boundary line, and south of the city of Keewatin, near the intersection of Stuart Road and County Road 944. County Road 16 (CR 16) and State Highway 73 (MN 73) are both nearby.

The site of Bengal is approximately 100 miles (160 km) from Duluth.

The boundary line between Saint Louis and Itasca counties is in the vicinity. The community of Silica is also nearby.

== History ==
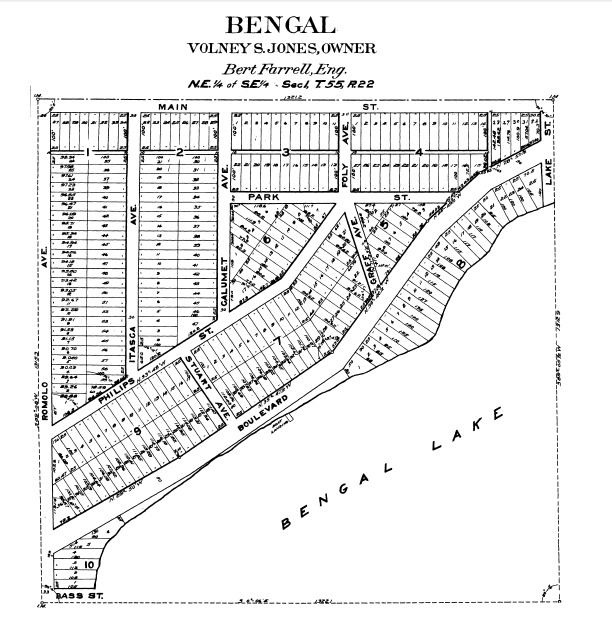
Bengal, Minnesota plat map, 1914

The area was originally a rail site known as Powers.

In 1914, Bengal was platted by Volney S. Jones and Carrie Jones, husband and wife residents of Duluth, Minnesota. The community was situated in Section 1 of Township 55, Range 22 of Itasca County, adjacent to St. Louis County. The filing occurred on July 10, 1914 and was approved by the St. Louis County commissioner on July 13. The land was surveyed by engineer and surveyor Burt Farrell.

Bengal was founded on the north side of Bengal Lake, with the townsite being divided into ten blocks. Bengal was connected to the Great Northern Railway, on the line connecting Swan River and Virginia, between Acropolis and Lynwood. By 1915, the Hartland Herald newspaper was calling Bengal a "town on the Great Northern Railway".

Bengal's founding was also announced in The Mining and Engineering Journal, where the town's prospects as a mining community were discussed: "New town of Bengal has just been platted in Sec. 1, 55-22, on line between St. Louis and Itasca Counties, 6 1/2 miles from Nashwauk. There are some iron prospects in [the] vicinity." The area was noted for both mining and farming, with the Minnesota Geological Survey stating in 1917, "There are also farming districts south of Grand Rapids, and a few farms are developed along the Great Northern Railway lines in the southeastern part of the county in the vicinity of Swan River, Goodland, Acropolis, and Bengal [...] vegetables form the principal crops, and amount to about 30 percent of the [crop] value."

Circa 1918, the Bengal School was one of 82 schools in the Itasca School District 1. Later, Bengal was moved to School District 9.

In March 1919, portions of west central St. Louis County were hit hard by influenza. Among the communities which were hardest hit were Lynwood and Bengal. According to the Glenville Progress, most of the victims of the disease were schoolchildren, a number of whom were seriously ill.

Bengal's population was 5 in 1920, and was 35 in 1940.

According to the Minnesota Department of Transportation, Bengal's population is estimated at 10.

== See also ==
- Costin Village, Minnesota
