= Pengilly =

Pengilly is a surname. Notable people with the surname include:

- Adam Pengilly (born 1977), British skeleton racer
- April Rose Pengilly (born 1988), actress and model
- Jessie Pengilly (1918–1945), Australian cyclist
- Kirk Pengilly (born 1958), Australian musician
- Michael Pengilly (born 1950), Australian politician

== See also ==
- Pengilly, Minnesota, unincorporated community in Minnesota
