= Goodland, Minnesota =

Unincorporated community in Minnesota, United States

Goodland
- Unincorporated community
- Location within Minnesota Location within the United States
- Coordinates: 47°09′43″N 93°08′09″W
- Country: United States
- State: Minnesota
- County: Itasca
- Township: Goodland Township

Area
  - Total: 0.12 sq mi (0.30 km^{2})
  - Land: 0.12 sq mi (0.30 km^{2})
  - Water: 0 sq mi (0.00 km^{2})
- Elevation: 1,417 ft (432 m)

Population (2020)
  - Total: 51
  - Density: 435.3/sq mi (168.08/km^{2})
- Time zone: UTC-6 (Central (CST))
  - Summer (DST): UTC-5 (CDT)
- ZIP code: 55742
- Area code: 218
- GNIS feature ID: 644221

Goodland is an unincorporated community in Goodland Township, Itasca County, Minnesota, United States. As of the 2020 census, Goodland had a population of 51.

The community is located east-southeast of Grand Rapids at the junction of Itasca County Roads 16 and 20; and State Highway 65 (MN 65). The boundary line between Itasca and Saint Louis counties is nearby.

Nearby places include Pengilly, Swan River, Warba, Wawina, and Silica. Goodland is located six miles north of Swan River and 12 miles south of Pengilly. Goodland is 19 miles east-southeast of Grand Rapids; and 22 miles southwest of Hibbing.

The community of Goodland is located within Goodland Township. Floodwood Lake is nearby. Goodland is 24 miles northwest of Floodwood and 25 miles west-northwest of Meadowlands.

Goodland ZIP code 55742.

== Demographics ==
Historical population
Census	Pop.	Note	%±
2020	51		—
U.S. Decennial Census

== See also ==
- Goodland Township
