= Swan River, Itasca County, Minnesota =

Unincorporated community in Minnesota, United States

Swan River
- Unincorporated community
- Location within Minnesota Location within the United States
- Coordinates: 47°05′12″N 93°11′42″W
- Country: United States
- State: Minnesota
- County: Itasca
- Elevation: 1,289 ft (393 m)
- Time zone: UTC-6 (Central (CST))
  - Summer (DST): UTC-5 (CDT)
- ZIP code: 55784
- Area code: 218
- GNIS feature ID: 652908

Swan River is an unincorporated community in southeast Itasca County, Minnesota, United States.

The community is located between Grand Rapids and Floodwood at the junction of U.S. Highway 2 (U.S. 2) and State Highway 65 (MN 65).

== History ==
A post office called Swan River was established in 1890 and remained in operation until 1995. The community took its name from the nearby Swan River.

== Geography ==
Bruce Creek flows through the community. Swan River is located along the boundary line between Sago Township and Wawina Township. The BNSF Railway passes through the community.

Nearby places include Warba, Wawina, Jacobson and Goodland. The boundary line between Itasca, Saint Louis and Aitkin counties is near Swan River.

Swan River is located 19 miles southeast of Grand Rapids, 17 miles northwest of Floodwood and 57 miles northwest of Duluth.

ZIP codes 55784 (Swan River), 55793 (Warba), and 55736 (Floodwood) all meet near Swan River.
