= Goodland Township =

Goodland Township is a name shared by two townships in the United States:

- Goodland Township, Michigan
- Goodland Township, Itasca County, Minnesota
