= Wawina, Minnesota =

Unincorporated community in Minnesota, United States

Wawina
- Unincorporated community
- Location within Minnesota Location within the United States
- Coordinates: 47°03′11″N 93°07′09″W
- Country: United States
- State: Minnesota
- County: Itasca
- Township: Wawina Township
- Elevation: 1,266 ft (386 m)

Population
  - Total: 10
- Time zone: UTC-6 (Central (CST))
  - Summer (DST): UTC-5 (CDT)
- ZIP code: 55736 or 55784
- Area code: 218
- GNIS feature ID: 653862

Wawina is an unincorporated community in Wawina Township, Itasca County, Minnesota, United States.

The community is located between Grand Rapids and Floodwood at the junction of U.S. Highway 2 and Itasca County Road 25.

Nearby places include Floodwood, Swan River, Warba, Jacobson, and Goodland.

Wawina is located 13 miles northwest of Floodwood. Wawina is also located 23 miles southeast of Grand Rapids; and 53 miles northwest of Duluth. The boundary line between Itasca, Saint Louis, and Aitkin counties is nearby.

The community of Wawina is located within Wawina Township (population 77).

ZIP Codes 55736 (Floodwood) and 55784 (Swan River) meet at Wawina.

== History ==
A post office called Wawina was established in 1912, and remained in operation until 1993. Wawina is a name derived from the Ojibwe language waawiinaa meaning "I mention him often" from wiinzh meaning "mention him/her".

== Culture ==
Wawina has the distinction of having America's smallest telephone company. Northern Telephone Company of Minnesota (Area Code 218–488) serves fewer than 40 subscribers.

It gained brief fame as the last place in the continental United States to use a trunking system (inter-office circuits) that was called "N2 Carrier", an analog system that utilized Multi-Frequency (MF) tones and the infamous 2600 Hz control tone for answer supervision and idle trunk condition. This system was much loved by phone phreaks as it was the same system which the now infamous John Draper made famous. The era ended in June 2006, when the privately owned exchange switched to a digital trunk. Phone hacking attempts from across the nation had placed a large burden on the extremely small telephone company serving Wawina Township.
