= Staples, Minnesota =

City in Minnesota, United States

City of Staples
- City
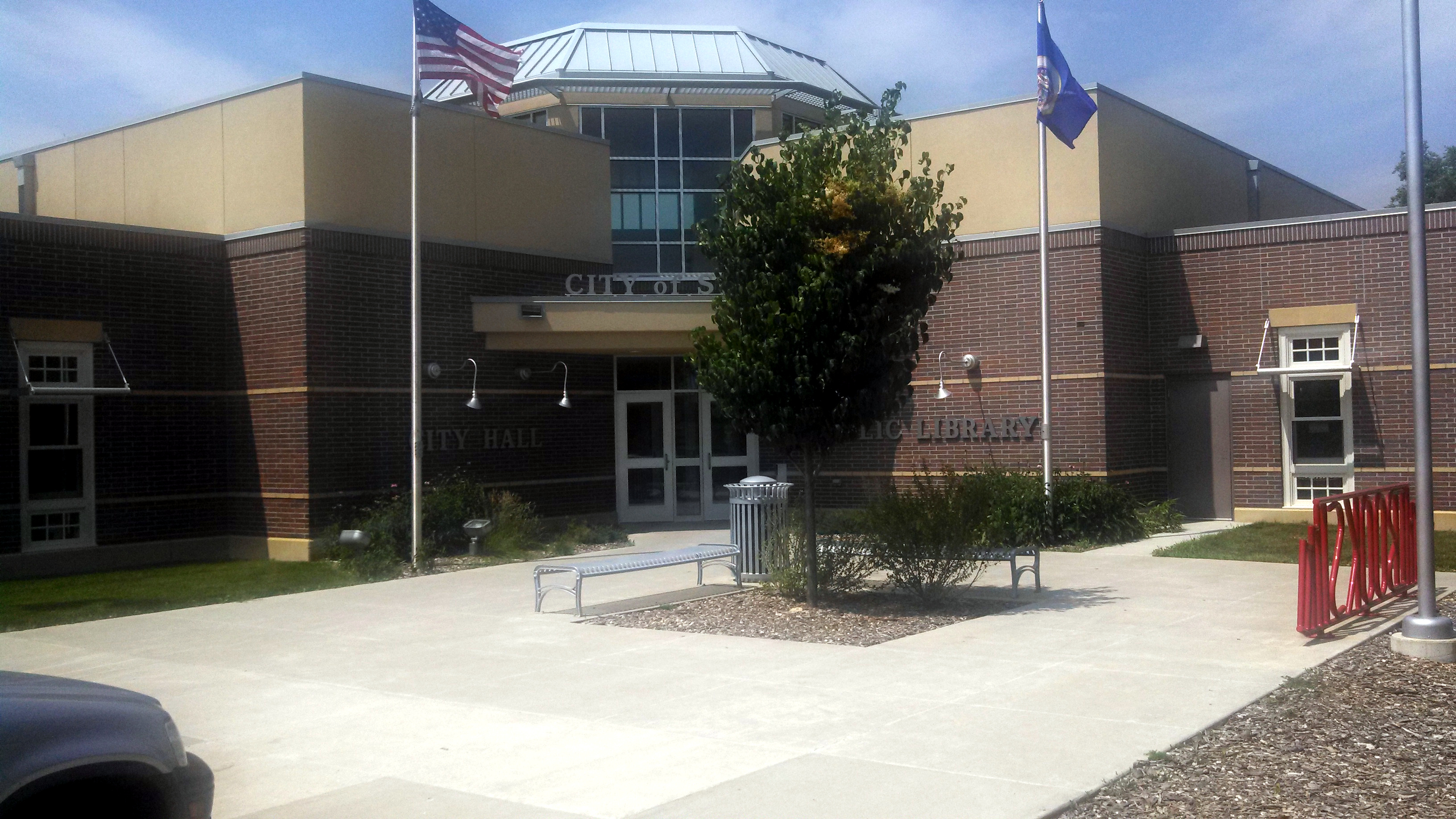
- Combined city hall and public library

- Location of Staples, Minnesota
- Coordinates: 46°22′09″N 94°48′07″W
- Country: United States
- State: Minnesota
- Counties: Todd, Wadena

Area
  - Total: 4.76 sq mi (12.34 km^{2})
  - Land: 4.76 sq mi (12.33 km^{2})
  - Water: 0.0039 sq mi (0.01 km^{2})
- Elevation: 1,273 ft (388 m)

Population (2020)
  - Total: 2,989
  - Estimate (2024): 3,075
  - Density: 627.8/sq mi (242.39/km^{2})
- Time zone: UTC-6 (CST)
  - Summer (DST): UTC-5 (CDT)
- ZIP code: 56479
- Area code: 218
- FIPS code: 27-62446
- GNIS feature ID: 2395955
- Website: staples.govoffice.com

Staples is a city in Todd and Wadena counties in the U.S. state of Minnesota. The population was 2,989 at the 2020 census.

== History ==
Staples developed around a sawmill. The settlement was originally called Staples Mill, and under the latter name was platted in 1889, and named for Samuel and Isaac Staples, businessmen in the lumber industry.

== Geography ==
According to the United States Census Bureau, the city has a total area of 4.68 square miles (12.12 km^{2}); 4.67 square miles (12.10 km^{2}) is land and 0.01 square miles (0.03 km^{2}) is water.

U.S. Route 10 and Minnesota State Highway 210 are two of the main routes in the city. The Empire Builder, an Amtrak route connecting Chicago with Seattle and Portland, Oregon, stops at the train station in Staples.

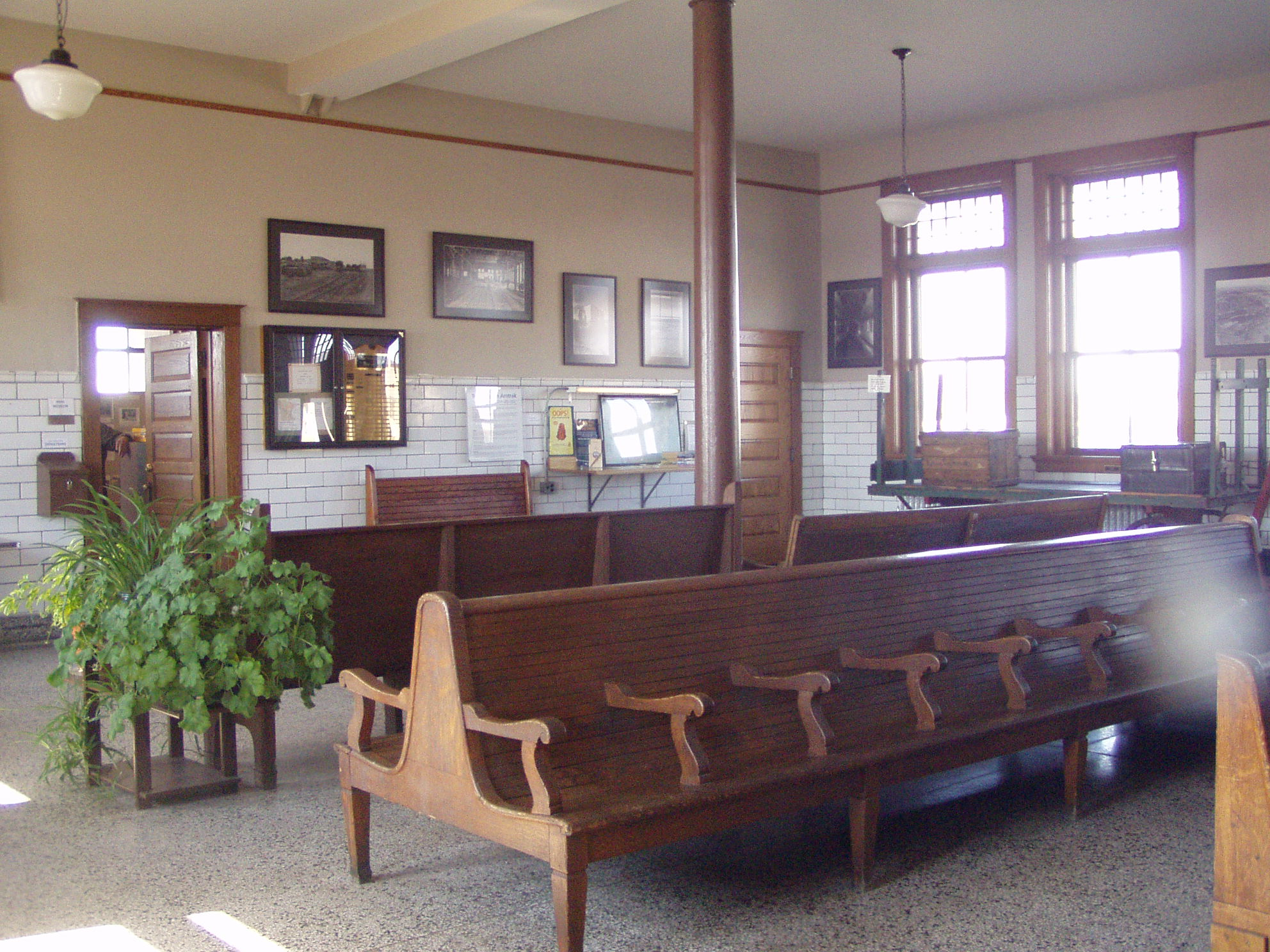
Interior of Staples Amtrak train depot.

== Demographics ==
Historical population
Census	Pop.	Note	%±
1890	585		—
1900	1,504		157.1%
1910	2,558		70.1%
1920	2,570		0.5%
1930	2,667		3.8%
1940	2,952		10.7%
1950	2,782		−5.8%
1960	2,706		−2.7%
1970	2,755		1.8%
1980	2,887		4.8%
1990	2,754		−4.6%
2000	3,104		12.7%
2010	2,981		−4.0%
2020	2,989		0.3%
2024 (est.)	3,075		2.9%
U.S. Decennial Census; 2020 Census

=== 2020 census ===
As of the 2020 census, Staples had a population of 2,989. The median age was 39.5 years. 23.4% of residents were under the age of 18 and 21.7% of residents were 65 years of age or older. For every 100 females there were 93.1 males, and for every 100 females age 18 and over there were 88.9 males age 18 and over.

0.0% of residents lived in urban areas, while 100.0% lived in rural areas.

There were 1,310 households in Staples, of which 27.0% had children under the age of 18 living in them. Of all households, 37.2% were married-couple households, 21.8% were households with a male householder and no spouse or partner present, and 32.5% were households with a female householder and no spouse or partner present. About 39.0% of all households were made up of individuals and 17.3% had someone living alone who was 65 years of age or older.

There were 1,502 housing units, of which 12.8% were vacant. The homeowner vacancy rate was 2.4% and the rental vacancy rate was 13.3%.

Racial composition as of the 2020 census
Race	Number	Percent
White	2,768	92.6%
Black or African American	20	0.7%
American Indian and Alaska Native	28	0.9%
Asian	11	0.4%
Native Hawaiian and Other Pacific Islander	1	0.0%
Some other race	36	1.2%
Two or more races	125	4.2%
Hispanic or Latino (of any race)	80	2.7%

=== 2010 census ===
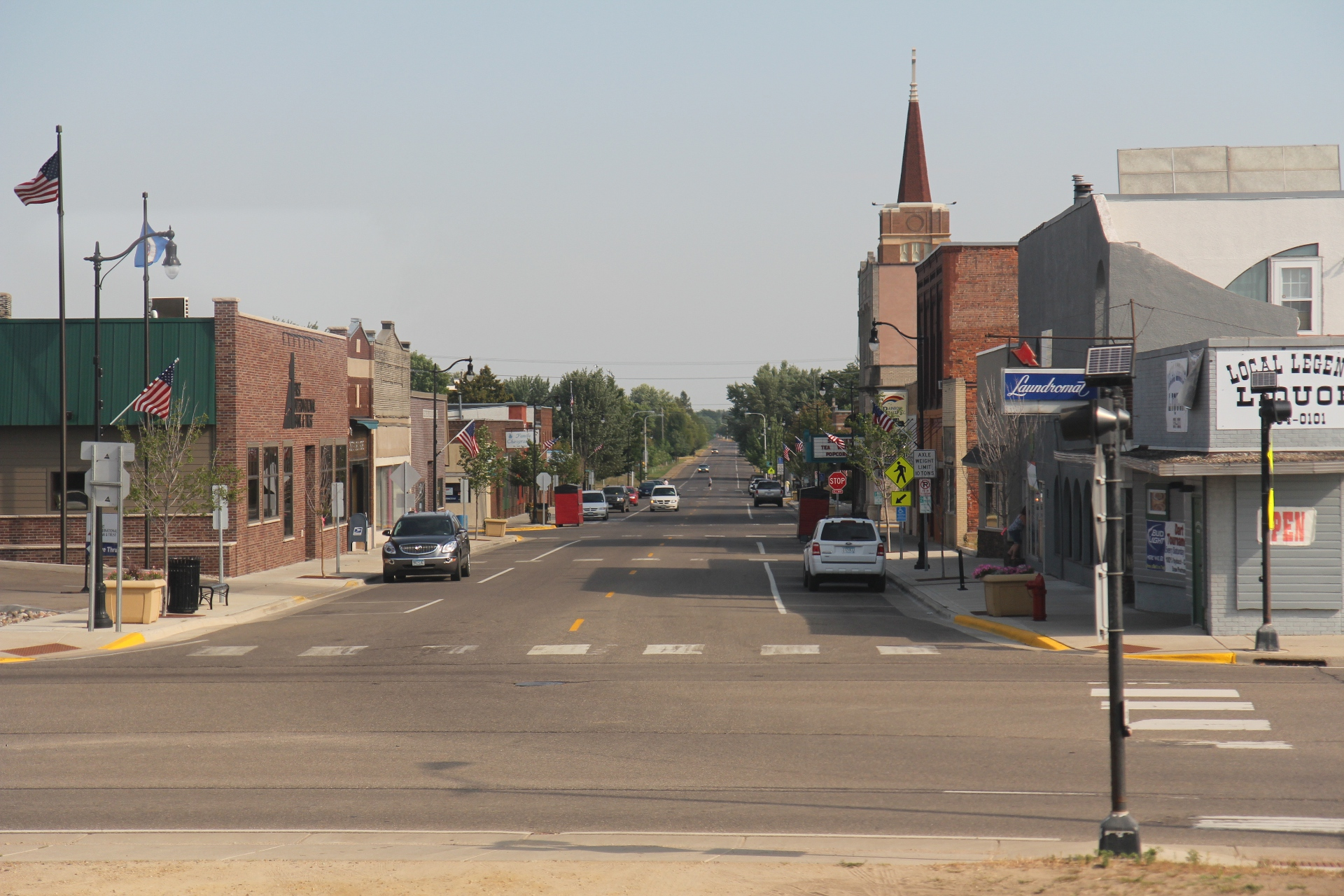
Downtown Staples

As of the census of 2010, there were 2,981 people, 1,222 households, and 696 families living in the city. The population density was 638.3 inhabitants per square mile (246.4/km^{2}). There were 1,469 housing units at an average density of 314.6 per square mile (121.5/km^{2}). The racial makeup of the city was 95.9% White, 0.5% African American, 0.9% Native American, 0.7% Asian, 0.3% from other races, and 1.6% from two or more races. Hispanic or Latino of any race were 1.5% of the population.

There were 1,222 households, of which 30.5% had children under the age of 18 living with them, 39.0% were married couples living together, 12.7% had a female householder with no husband present, 5.3% had a male householder with no wife present, and 43.0% were non-families. 37.0% of all households were made up of individuals, and 16.8% had someone living alone who was 65 years of age or older. The average household size was 2.26 and the average family size was 2.94.

The median age in the city was 38.8 years. 24.1% of residents were under the age of 18; 10% were between the ages of 18 and 24; 21.8% were from 25 to 44; 22.5% were from 45 to 64; and 21.6% were 65 years of age or older. The gender makeup of the city was 47.6% male and 52.4% female.

=== 2000 census ===
As of the census of 2000, there were 3,104 people, 1,278 households, and 732 families living in the city. The population density was 684.5 inhabitants per square mile (264.3/km^{2}). There were 1,436 housing units at an average density of 316.7 per square mile (122.3/km^{2}). The racial makeup of the city was 97.49% White, 0.26% African American, 0.81% Native American, 0.35% Asian, 0.23% from other races, and 0.87% from two or more races. Hispanic or Latino of any race were 1.48% of the population. 33.5% were of German, 12.5% Norwegian, 6.4% American, 6.0% Irish and 5.9% Swedish ancestry.

There were 1,278 households, out of which 30.5% had children under the age of 18 living with them, 41.8% were married couples living together, 12.1% had a female householder with no husband present, and 42.7% were non-families. 35.8% of all households were made up of individuals, and 19.2% had someone living alone who was 65 years of age or older. The average household size was 2.36 and the average family size was 3.09.

In the city, the population was spread out, with 27.2% under the age of 18, 11.4% from 18 to 24, 24.0% from 25 to 44, 18.6% from 45 to 64, and 18.8% who were 65 years of age or older. The median age was 36 years. For every 100 females, there were 92.4 males. For every 100 females age 18 and over, there were 91.6 males.

The median income for a household in the city was $25,208, and the median income for a family was $33,472. Males had a median income of $26,481 versus $18,407 for females. The per capita income for the city was $14,244. About 15.4% of families and 20.3% of the population were below the poverty line, including 23.9% of those under age 18 and 9.4% of those age 65 or over.

== Notable people ==
- Norbert P. Arnold, Minnesota State Senator
- Loren Bain, pitcher for the San Francisco Giants of Major League Baseball
- Dick Bremer, TV broadcaster for the Minnesota Twins
- Kathryn Edin, William Church Osborn Professor of Sociology and Public Affairs, at Princeton University
- Richard Nelson Gardner (1881–1953), Minnesota state senator and lawyer
- Jon Hassler (1933 – 2008), American writer known for his novels about small-town life in Minnesota
- Dave Joerger, professional basketball coach with the Milwaukee Bucks (NBA)
- Bruce G. Nelsen, Minnesota legislator
- Alfred E. Perlman, President of the New York Central Railroad and Western Pacific Railroad
- Dallas Sams, Minnesota legislator
- Gil Skeate, fullback for the Green Bay Packers of the NFL
- LaVyrle Spencer, best-selling author of romance novels, attended high school in Staples
- Frankie Thorn, actress

== Transportation ==
The Amtrak station sees more than 5,000 riders a year get on or off the daily Empire Builder service. The west bound train from Chicago and St Paul arrives an hour or two after midnight, heading toward Fargo and Seattle/Portland. East bound Empire Builders from Fargo arrive about 4 a.m. heading toward a daylight arrival in St Paul and an afternoon arrival in Chicago.

The city of Staples has the junction of the BNSF Railway between their Staples Subdivision and the Brainerd Subdivision.

== Media ==
The official weekly newspaper of Staples is the Staples World, with a circulation of 2,400.

== Education ==
The Staples-Motley High School is located in the city.
