= Swan River (northern Minnesota) =

Coordinates: 47°00′33″N 93°15′50″W

The Swan River is a tributary of the Mississippi River, approximately 60 mi (97 km) long, in northeastern Minnesota in the United States.

It rises in Swan Lake, in southeast Itasca County, near Pengilly, approximately 13 mi (21 km) southwest of Hibbing. It flows southwest, east of Trout Lake, then SSE past Warba. It joins the Mississippi in northern Aitkin County at Jacobson, approximately 20 mi (32 km) southeast of Grand Rapids. At Warba, the river measures approximately 130 cubic feet per second.

Swan River is an English translation of the native Ojibwe-language name.

== See also ==
- List of Minnesota rivers
