= Norbert P. Arnold =

American politician

Norbert P. Arnold, Jr.
- Born: October 3, 1920; Staples, Minnesota, United States
- Died: December 13, 2014 (aged 94)
- Education: University of Minnesota
- Occupations: Mechanical Engineer; Businessman; Politician
- Known for: Inventing the Arnold Ranger V (Arnold Ferret Tracker), Serving in the Minnesota State Senate
- Political party: Democrat

Norbert P. Arnold, Jr. (October 3, 1920, – December 13, 2014) was an American mechanical engineer, businessman, and politician.

Born in Staples, Minnesota, Arnold served in the United States Navy during World War II. He received his bachelor's degree in mechanical engineering from the University of Minnesota. He owned a manufacturing company in Pengilly, Minnesota and had invented the Arnold Ranger V (later renamed Arnold Ferret Tracker), a twin-tracked, no-ski season vehicle. From 1967 to 1977, Arnold served in the Minnesota State Senate and was a Democrat. In 1983, Arnold retired and moved to Inver Grove Heights, Minnesota.
