= Mike Peluso (ice hockey, born 1965) =

American ice hockey player

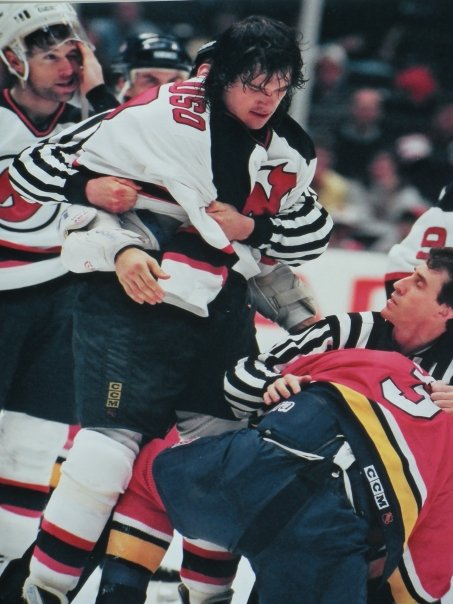
- Born: November 8, 1965 (age 60) Pengilly, Minnesota, U.S.
- Height: 6 ft 4 in (193 cm)
- Weight: 225 lb (102 kg; 16 st 1 lb)
- Position: Left wing
- Shot: Left
- Played for: Chicago Blackhawks; Ottawa Senators; New Jersey Devils; St. Louis Blues; Calgary Flames
- NHL draft: 190th overall, 1984; New Jersey Devils
- Playing career: 1990–1997

Michael David Peluso (born November 8, 1965), is an American former professional ice hockey player. Peluso was known primarily as an enforcer throughout his National Hockey League (NHL) career. Peluso played in the NHL from 1990 until 1998 with the Chicago Blackhawks, Ottawa Senators, New Jersey Devils, St. Louis Blues, and Calgary Flames. He won the Stanley Cup in 1995 with New Jersey as part of the "Crash Line". He also won the 1990 Turner Cup with the Indianapolis Ice of the International Hockey League. He is one of three players in NHL history to have over 400 penalty minutes in one season.

== Early life ==
Peluso was born in Pengilly, Minnesota. His father was a steelworker and his mother a childcare worker. He had three older brothers. He liked sports, but was never great at them, he played hockey with his brothers, lining up as a defenseman when playing for his high school team, the Greenway Raiders. In his senior year, Peluso only played 12 games due to a teacher strike.

== Playing career ==
=== College career ===
Peluso was drafted by the New Jersey Devils of the National Hockey League (NHL) in the tenth round, 190th overall, in the 1984 NHL entry draft out of high school. The Devils selected him mainly for his size, but both Peluso and the team believed that he should return to school. Peluso earned a scholarship to the University of Alaska Anchorage where he studied sociology while playing for the Alaska Anchorage Seawolves, a National Collegiate Athletic Association (NCAA) Division I college ice hockey program beginning in the 1985–86 season. The NCAA did not allow fighting and Peluso became the Seawolves' all-time scoring leader at defense, and set records for assists and points in a season by a defenseman. Peluso was named captain of the team for three years and was twice named an All-Great West Conference selection. The Seawolves won the Jeep/Nissan Classic tournament in December 1988. He remained at Alaska Anchorage until 1989.

=== Chicago Blackhawks ===
The Devils never attempted to sign Peluso and he became a free agent at the end of his college tenure. He first enquired with the Minnesota North Stars, but they declined. Peluso then signed as a free agent with the Chicago Blackhawks in 1989. Upon joining the Hawks, he was switched to forward and encouraged to fight in order to stay in the lineup by coach Mike Keenan. He was assigned to Chicago's affiliate, the Indianapolis Ice of the International Hockey League (IHL), where under coach Darryl Sutter, he was taught how to be a role player. Peluso was recalled by Chicago early in the 1989–90 season but never saw game time. He was returned to Indianapolis where he missed time with a broken cheekbone suffered in a fight. He was recalled again to replace the suspended Dave Manson in December 1989 and played in his first NHL game on December 28. He fought Basil McRae of the Minnesota North Stars in his first NHL game, during which McRae attempted to knee Peluso and was ejected from the game for it. On the ensuing power play, the Blackhawks' Denis Savard tied the game at 1–1, which ended up being the final score. Peluso played one more NHL game, before being returned to Indianapolis on January 1, 1990, when Steve Thomas returned from injury. Peluso won the 1990 Turner Cup with Indianapolis after they swept the Muskegon Lumberjacks in the final.

Peluso made the Blackhawks out of training camp for the 1990–91 season. He scored his first NHL goal on October 16 on Tim Cheveldae, putting in a rebound off a shot from Troy Murray in a 3–2 loss to the Detroit Red Wings. On November 8, in a game versus the Edmonton Oilers, Peluso was on the receiving end of a shot that hit his cheek. He missed eleven games before being sent to the IHL on December 6. He returned to Chicago on December 28 On March 17, 1991, in a violent game versus the St. Louis Blues, Peluso was one of three Blackhawk goalscorers to take a 4–2 lead. However, in the third period five players were ejected for fighting, among them Peluso. Peluso and Kelly Chase of the Blues were suspended for ten games and received a $10,000 fine for leaving the bench for fighting. Peluso was eligible to return in game four of the opening round of the 1991 Stanley Cup playoffs. He returned to the lineup and played in his first NHL playoff game in game four of the first round series versus the Minnesota North Stars on April 10. However, the Blackhawks were eliminated by the North Stars in seven games.

Now an established enforcer, he began the season with Chicago, but was sent to Indianapolis on October 15. He was recalled on November 3 after appearing in four games, registering one point. Peluso registered 408 penalty minutes (PIM) in 63 games during the 1991–92 NHL season, becoming one of only three players in NHL history, and the most recent, to have accumulated 400 PIM or more in a single season and the third highest total in NHL history. On May 16, 1992, in the third round series of the 1992 playoffs versus the Edmonton Oilers, he scored his first playoff goal on Bill Ranford in an 8–2 Chicago victory. Peluso played a key role in the Blackhawks' run to the 1992 Stanley Cup Final that playoffs where they lost to the Pittsburgh Penguins.

=== Ottawa Senators ===
With the rules around fighting changing in the NHL, the Blackhawks chose to keep Stu Grimson over Peluso and Peluso was left exposed for the 1992 NHL expansion draft. He was selected by the Ottawa Senators as the second forward chosen by the team. He made his Senators debut in the team's inaugural game on October 8, 1992, a 5–2 victory over the Montreal Canadiens. He scored his first goal as a Senator in the next game on October 10, beating Ron Hextall of the Quebec Nordiques in an 8–2 loss. Peluso helped the Senators end a 21-game winless streak when he had the first multi-goal game of his career on November 25. He scored two goals on Chris Terreri in a 3–1 victory over the New Jersey Devils. During his only season in Ottawa, he set the club record for most penalty minutes in a single season (318), but was allowed to play a more offensive role, scoring 15 goals along with 25 points, good for fifth on the team. A popular player with fans, he fell out with management over his role on the team, believing he was more than just an enforcer. On June 24, 1993, he was traded to the New Jersey Devils to complete an earlier transaction that sent Craig Billington and Troy Mallette to Ottawa for Peter Sidorkiewicz, Ottawa's fourth-round choice in the 1993 entry draft, and future considerations.

=== New Jersey Devils ===
As in Ottawa, Peluso's gritty, hard-nosed and intimidating style made him something of a popular player in New Jersey. He made his debut with the Devils on opening night, October 6, 1993, in a 2–1 victory over the Tampa Bay Lightning. He registered his first point for the Devils in the following game on October 8, assisting on Scott Stevens' opening goal in the first period of a 6–3 win over the Washington Capitals. Peluso scored his first goal for New Jersey on October 30 in a 5–3 win over the Philadelphia Flyers. During the lockout-shortened 1994–95 NHL season he was an integral part of the infamous "Crash Line" with Randy McKay and Bobby Holík, a fourth-line combination whose energy and timely goal-scoring helped the Devils win their first Stanley Cup in 1995. Peluso returned to the Devils for the 1995–96 season and spent most of the season in the lineup. The "Crash Line" was broken up in early January after Peluso's skate accidentally struck McKay in the head, giving McKay a concussion and keeping him out of the lineup. At the end of February, Peluso hurt his left leg in a game versus the Florida Panthers and missed two games before returning on March 1 for a game versus the New York Islanders. Despite scoring to tie the game, Peluso reinjured his leg. Peluso missed 14 games due to the hit by Darius Kasparaitis of the Islanders on his already injured left leg, returning on April 2 versus the New York Rangers. However, Peluso became upset with his playing time and with coach Jacques Lemaire prior to the game on March 22 versus the Pittsburgh Penguins in Pittsburgh, and Peluso was sent back to New Jersey even as the team took the ice. Peluso and Lemaire later repaired their relationship. The Devils failed to make the playoffs and the emergence of Reid Simpson made Peluso expendable.

=== St. Louis Blues ===
Peluso returned to the Devils for the beginning of the 1996–97 season, with Denis Pederson replacing Holík on the fourth line. However, after twenty games and registering only two points, Peluso was acquired by his old coach, Mike Keenan, now general manager of the St. Louis Blues, on November 26 along with defenceman Ricard Persson for defenceman Ken Sutton and a 1999 second-round draft pick. He made his first appearance for the Blues on November 27 in a 3–2 victory over the Mighty Ducks of Anaheim, playing on a line with Geoff Courtnall and Peter Zezel. He registered his first point with the Blues in the game, assisting on Courtnall's game-tying goal in the second period. Peluso scored his first goal in a Blues' uniform on February 10, 1997, on Nikolai Khabibulin in a 4–2 loss to the Phoenix Coyotes. The Blues made the 1997 Stanley Cup playoffs but were eliminated by the Detroit Red Wings in the first round. At season's end, Peluso became an unrestricted free agent.

=== Calgary Flames ===
On June 21, 1997, Peluso was traded to the New York Rangers as compensation for St. Louis signing one of New York's executives, Larry Pleau, to be their new general manager. He signed a new contract with the Rangers in August. However, the Rangers chose to leave him unprotected in the waiver draft on September 28 and Peluso was selected by the Calgary Flames. He made his Flames debut in the team's season opener of the 1997–98 season, a 3–1 loss to the Detroit Red Wings. Peluso played in his final NHL game on November 23, 1997, in a 3–3 tie with the Carolina Hurricanes. Peluso began to miss time with a chronic neck injury and received a diagnosis of spinal stenosis. He announced his retirement on December 30, 1997.

== Career statistics ==
Bold indicates led league

			Regular season					Playoffs
Season	Team	League	GP	G	A	Pts	PIM	GP	G	A	Pts	PIM
1983–84	Greenway High School	HS-MN	12	5	15	20	30	—	—	—	—	—
1984–85	Stratford Cullitons	MWJHL	40	10	35	45	114	—	—	—	—	—
1985–86	University of Alaska Anchorage	GWHC	32	2	11	13	59	—	—	—	—	—
1986–87	University of Alaska Anchorage	GWHC	30	5	21	26	68	—	—	—	—	—
1987–88	University of Alaska Anchorage	GWHC	35	4	33	37	76	—	—	—	—	—
1988–89	University of Alaska Anchorage	NCAA	33	10	27	37	75	—	—	—	—	—
1989–90	Chicago Blackhawks	NHL	2	0	0	0	15	—	—	—	—	—
1989–90	Indianapolis Ice	IHL	75	7	10	17	279	14	0	1	1	58
1990–91	Chicago Blackhawks	NHL	53	6	1	7	320	3	0	0	0	2
1990–91	Indianapolis Ice	IHL	6	2	1	3	21	5	0	2	2	40
1991–92	Chicago Blackhawks	NHL	63	6	3	9	**408**	17	1	2	3	8
1991–92	Indianapolis Ice	IHL	4	0	1	1	15	—	—	—	—	—
1992–93	Ottawa Senators	NHL	81	15	10	25	318	—	—	—	—	—
1993–94	New Jersey Devils	NHL	69	4	16	20	238	17	1	0	1	64
1994–95	New Jersey Devils	NHL	46	2	9	11	167	20	1	2	3	8
1995–96	New Jersey Devils	NHL	57	3	8	11	146	—	—	—	—	—
1996–97	New Jersey Devils	NHL	20	0	2	2	68	—	—	—	—	—
1996–97	St. Louis Blues	NHL	44	2	3	5	158	5	0	0	0	25
1997–98	Calgary Flames	NHL	23	0	0	0	113	—	—	—	—	—
NHL totals			458	38	52	90	1951	62	3	4	7	107

== Personal life ==
After retiring, Peluso and his wife, Heather, live in Edina, Minnesota. He was named to the Seawolves' hall of fame in 2002. He was employed as a scout by the Edmonton Oilers.

=== Injury and lawsuit ===
On December 18, 1993, while playing for the New Jersey Devils in a game against the Quebec Nordiques, Peluso was injured in a fight against Tony Twist. He was diagnosed with a concussion and sat out the next two games before returning to action five days later. Despite his continuing to play Peluso suffered a seizure and Dr. Marvin Ruderman allegedly wrote in January 1994 that Peluso:

"...should not sustain any further trauma to his head or he will suffer additional seizures and long-lasting brain damage...."

Because his role with the team was as an enforcer Peluso was expected to both sustain and dole out punishment, or as his lawsuit states:

"...he was on the ice to fight."

Peluso remained on the roster and continued to play for the Devils for much of the next three years, including winning the 1995 Stanley Cup, but recalls overhearing then-trainer Teddy Schuch wonder as to Peluso's health only to be overruled by team doctor Barry Fisher. Peluso was later traded to the St. Louis Blues during the 1996–97 NHL season before finishing his professional career with the Calgary Flames the following year.

In 2012, after years of suffering from seizures, dementia, memory loss, anxiety and depression, Peluso filed for workers' compensation in California, naming the last four teams he had played for in his NHL career (he suited up for the Ottawa Senators prior to sustaining the concussion) as defendants. In the filing Peluso alleged that he spent tens of thousands of dollars on medical procedures and medication to alleviate his ailments. After several years of litigation Peluso was offered a $325,000 settlement but rejected the offer in August 2017.

Several months passed with no resolution in the matter and in January 2019 Peluso sued the New Jersey Devils, former general manager Lou Lamoriello and doctors Marvin Ruderman, Len Jaffe and Barry Fisher. The suit alleged that Peluso's medical issues resulted from the injury he sustained in 1993, that team owners knew about the damage and hid the severity of the injury from him and the two teams that signed him subsequently. The case was dismissed in August 2019.
