= Northern Lights Community School =

Coordinates: 47.1284°N 93.2703°W

- Warba, Minnesota; United States

Information
- Type: charter school
- Established: 2005
- Website: www.nlcschool.org

The Northern Lights Community School is a charter school in Warba, Minnesota, United States. The Northern Lights Community School (NLCS), 6−12, uses project-based learning. The school also focuses on community service, by communicating with members and organizations of the community and by requiring 40 hours of community service each year.

== Academia ==
The Northern Lights Community School requires one session of math each day, along with one reading session and two seminars which changes each quarter. Seminars include intensive academics in the areas of Language Arts, Social Studies, Science, art, music, and elective courses. Students take the Hope Study Survey Test at the beginning and end of the year to monitor progress in the subject areas of autonomy, belongingness, goal orientation, engagement, and hope. The test was created by EdVisions Schools to assess "emotional and psychological growth" in students.

== Student population ==
The Northern Lights Community School currently is educating around 100 students. There are 7 advisory sections, each with approximately twenty students, one advisor, and one project manager.

== Grants and affiliations ==
The Northern Lights Community School (NLCS) is a member of the Green Charter School Network and has received a $1,000 grant from the Network. NLCS is an EdVisions School, an organization supported by the Gates Foundation. NLCS received a Federal Charter School start-up grant that helped them design the school and purchase furniture, supplies, sports equipment, and enough computers to have one computer per every two students. NLCS also has recently received a $500,000 grant for remodeling from the Minnesota Department of Education.
