= Gil Skeate =

American football player (1901–1952)

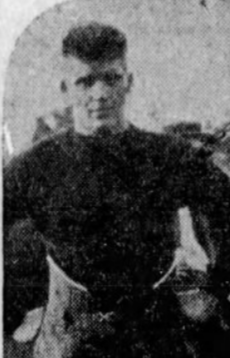
- Skeate, c. 1922

Profile
- Position: Fullback

Personal information
- Born: May 19, 1901; Staples, Minnesota, U.S.
- Died: January 30, 1952 (aged 50); Spokane, Washington, U.S.
- Listed height: 5 ft 10 in (1.78 m)
- Listed weight: 190 lb (86 kg)

Career information
- High school: Aberdeen (WA)
- College: Gonzaga (1921–1924)

Career history
- Tacoma Athletic Club (1925–1926); Green Bay Packers (1927); Aberdeen American Legion (1927–c. 1930)

Career statistics
- Games played: 2
- Stats at Pro Football Reference

Gilbert T. Skeate (May 19, 1901 – January 30, 1952) was an American professional football fullback. He played college football for the Gonzaga Bulldogs and later one season in the National Football League (NFL) for the Green Bay Packers. He also played semi-professionally for a team in Tacoma, Washington, and for an American Legion team in Aberdeen, Washington.

== Early life ==
Skeate was born on May 19, 1901, in Staples, Minnesota. He attended Aberdeen High School in Washington where he began playing football by 1917 and was team captain in 1920. He was starting fullback for Aberdeen and helped them become one of the best teams in the state in his senior year, 1920. In between his years at Aberdeen, he served in World War I for the United States Marine Corps. After high school, Skeate began attending Gonzaga University and played for their football team in 1921. The Spokane Chronicle described him as "fast ... [with] a fine eye for the line openings," and he saw some action as a starter for Gonzaga that year. He was also used as their punter, although he missed some time due to injury.

Skeate continued playing fullback for Gonzaga in 1922. He acquired a skin disease in the summer of 1923 that prevented him from playing in the start of the 1923 football season. He recovered in October and returned to the football team. Soon after, he made had his "big moment" and was a key part of Gonzaga's win over Washington State. He continued playing for Gonzaga in 1924 and helped them defeat Washington State again. According to the Green Bay Press-Gazette, he was named all-northwest in his last two years at Gonzaga.

At Gonzaga, Skeate was nicknamed "Gib". He weighed between 195 pounds (88 kg) and 200 pounds (91 kg) there and was considered "a big man for a back in those days." One of his teammates, Ray Flaherty, later said that Skeate "played fullback and quarterback and was extremely active for such a big man."

== Professional career ==
After Skeate graduated from Gonzaga, he played semi-professional football for the Tacoma Athletic Club in Tacoma, Washington, from 1925 to 1926. Outside of football, he worked in the lumber business. In 1927, former Gonzaga teammate Tiny Cahoon suggested signing Skeate to Green Bay Packers head coach Curly Lambeau, with Cahoon praising Skeate's ability as a "line plunger". The Packers had difficulty contacting Skeate, who was then working at a lumber camp outside of Aberdeen, but he eventually wired on September 20, "Leaving for Green Bay tonight." He arrived at Green Bay eight days later, and made his NFL debut on October 2, 1927, against the Chicago Bears, appearing as a substitute for Rex Enright. He then was the team's starter one week later against the Duluth Eskimos, but afterwards was released for unknown reasons and never played in the NFL again.

After his stint with the Packers, Skeate returned to the Northwest, describing his experiences in pro football in The Oregonian. He said that "Playing on a college team is like fooling around compared to the pro game. When you play pro ball you play: if you don't you won't be there long." In December 1927, he joined the Aberdeen American Legion football team. He was still with the American Legion team by 1930, with the Associated Press noting that "Fourteen years of football have only made Gilbert Skeate ... play better than ever." He was also the only member of the American Legion team that served in a war.

== Later life and death ==
After his football career, Skeate worked as a deputy fish inspector in Washington. He was a member of the Elks Lodge. He was married to Esther Skeate and had two daughters with her. He lived his last years in Republic, Washington, and died in Spokane on January 30, 1952, at the age of 50.
