= Wawina Township, Itasca County, Minnesota =

Wawina Township, Minnesota
- Township
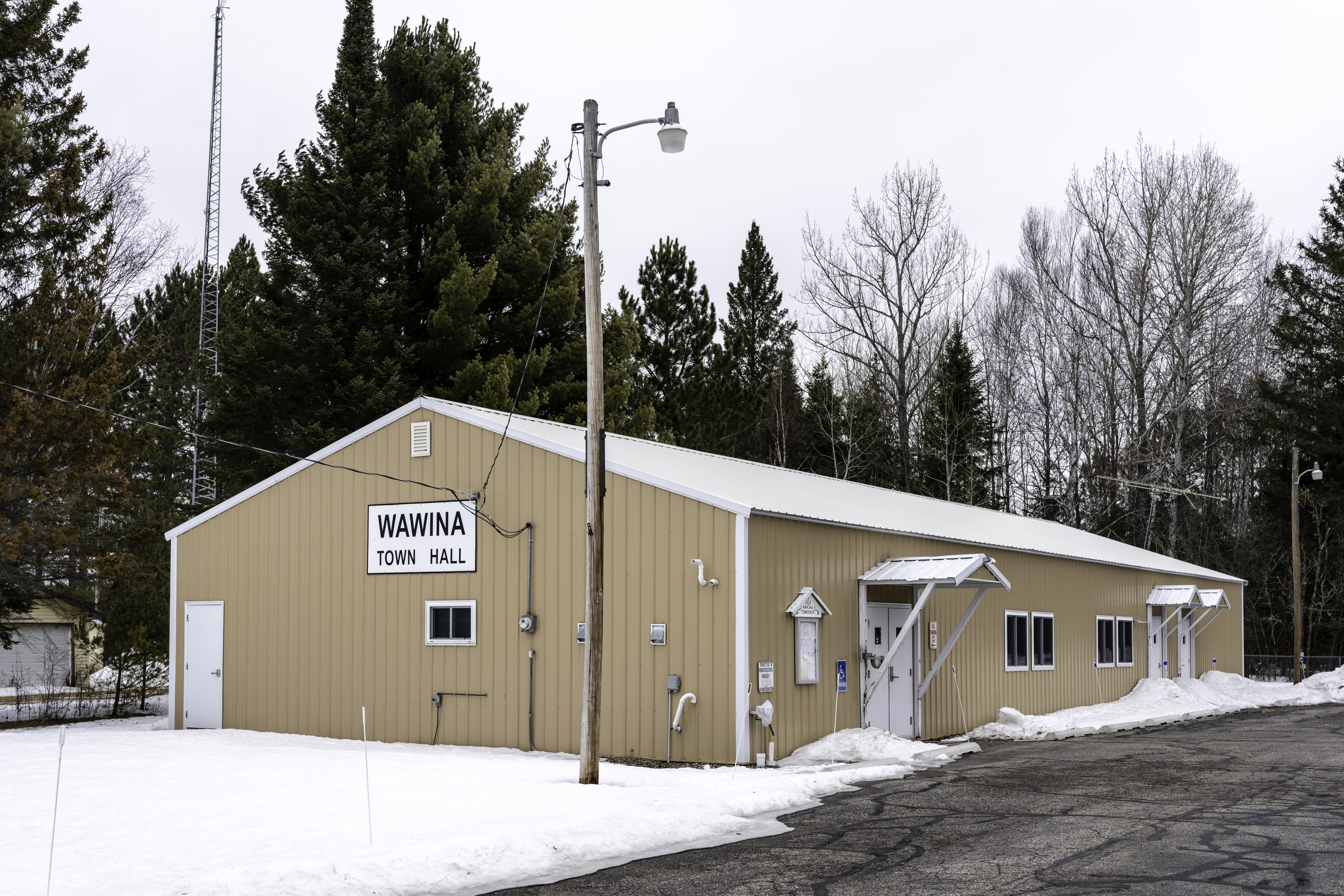
- Wawina Town Hall

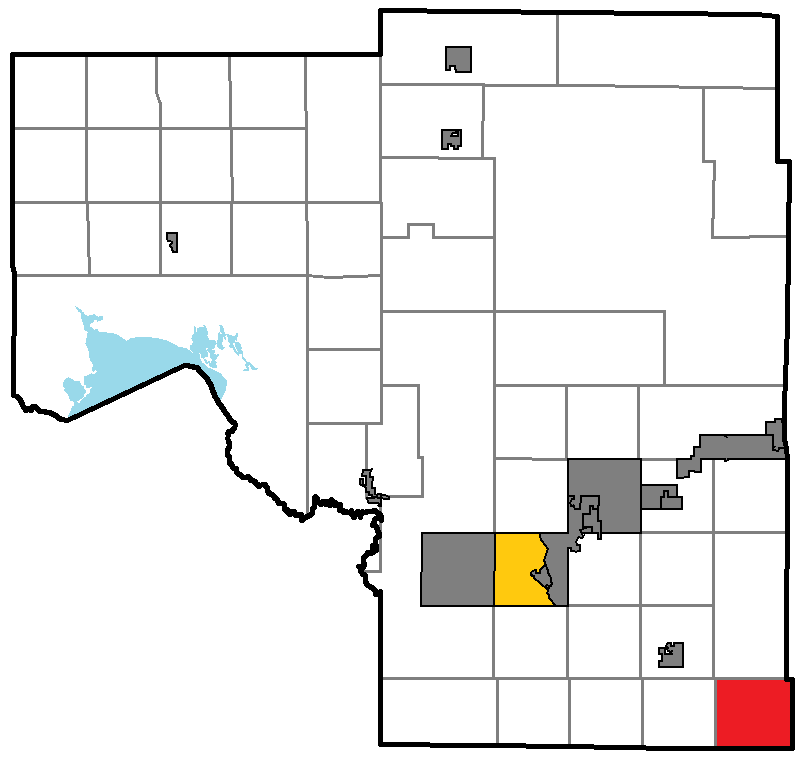
- Location of Wawina Township, within Itasca County
- Coordinates: 47°3′58″N 93°6′51″W
- Country: United States
- State: Minnesota
- County: Itasca

Area
  - Total: 36.6 sq mi (94.7 km^{2})
  - Land: 36.5 sq mi (94.6 km^{2})
  - Water: 0 sq mi (0.0 km^{2})
- Elevation: 1,270 ft (387 m)

Population (2020)
  - Total: 85
  - Density: 2.3/sq mi (0.90/km^{2})
- Time zone: UTC-6 (Central (CST))
  - Summer (DST): UTC-5 (CDT)
- FIPS code: 27-68800
- GNIS feature ID: 0665942

Wawina Township is a township in Itasca County, Minnesota, United States. The population was 85 at the 2020 census.

This township took its name from Wawina, Minnesota.

== Geography ==
According to the United States Census Bureau, the township has a total area of 36.5 square miles (94.7 km^{2}), of which 36.5 square miles (94.6 km^{2}) is land and 0.03% is water.

== Demographics ==
As of the census of 2000, there were 110 people, 40 households, and 26 families residing in the township. The population density was 3.0 people per square mile (1.2/km^{2}). There were 76 housing units at an average density of 2.1/sq mi (0.8/km^{2}). The racial makeup of the township was 99.09% White, and 0.91% from two or more races.

There were 40 households, out of which 37.5% had children under the age of 18 living with them, 55.0% were married couples living together, 10.0% had a female householder with no husband present, and 35.0% were non-families. 35.0% of all households were made up of individuals, and 17.5% had someone living alone who was 65 years of age or older. The average household size was 2.75 and the average family size was 3.62.

In the township the population was spread out, with 35.5% under the age of 18, 5.5% from 18 to 24, 23.6% from 25 to 44, 21.8% from 45 to 64, and 13.6% who were 65 years of age or older. The median age was 36 years. For every 100 females, there were 139.1 males. For every 100 females age 18 and over, there were 115.2 males.

The median income for a household in the township was $19,167, and the median income for a family was $24,583. Males had a median income of $45,625 versus $15,750 for females. The per capita income for the township was $10,860. There were 9.5% of families and 7.4% of the population living below the poverty line, including 7.1% of under eighteens and none of those over 64.

== Culture ==
Wawina has the distinction of having America's smallest telephone company. Northern Telephone Company of Minnesota (Area Code 218-488) serves fewer than 40 subscribers.

It gained brief fame as the last place in the continental United States to use a trunking system (inter-office circuits) that was called "N2 Carrier", an analog system that utilized Multi-Frequency (MF) tones and the notorious 2600 Hz control tone for answer supervision and idle trunk condition. This system was much loved by phone phreaks as it was the same system which the now infamous John Draper made famous. The era ended in June 2006, when the privately owned exchange switched to a digital trunk. Phone hacking attempts from across the nation had placed a large burden on the extremely small telephone company serving the township.
