= Jessie Pengilly =

Australian racing cyclist

Jessie Eunice Pengilly (14 August 1918 – 29 May 1945) was an Australian world-record-holding cyclist from Kellerberrin, Western Australia.

At the time of her death in a road traffic accident, aged 26, she held 43 women's cycling records including three world, 17 Australian and 23 Western Australian records.

== Early life ==
Born in Subiaco, Pengilly grew up on the family's Fair View Farm, near Kellerberrin. As an 11-year-old her short stories were published in the Western Australian Sunday Times newspaper. She went on to become an outstanding woman athlete, hockey player, yachtswoman and cyclist. She worked as a clerk at Bushells Coffee in Fremantle and lived in Cottesloe.

== Cycling career ==
Jessie Pengilly joined the women's section of the 'City of Perth Cycling Club' in 1937, and by 1938 she was successful in unpaced road racing.

By July 1940 she held the Northam-to-Perth, Perth-to-Northam, York-to-Perth, the 26- and 50-mile, and the 1-, 2- and 3-hour cycling records. She then cut 29.5 minutes off Joan Randall's Perth-York record despite riding into wind and rain, plus suffering a puncture. She rode a Bluebird standard bicycle fitted with Osgear Derailleur gears designed by Oscar Egg.

== Death ==
Pengilly died from multiple injuries on 27 May 1945, when the small sports car in which she was a passenger skidded on tram lines on a wet road and collided with a Pioneer bus near the Swan Brewery in Mounts Bay Road, Perth. The driver of the car, Joseph Kenneth Willis, was killed three months later in a road incident nearby, at the corner of Hay Street and Victoria Avenue, on 15 August 1945.

== Records ==
=== World (road) ===
- 50-mile straightaway - 2 h 50 s;
- 75 mile straightaway - 3 h 7 min 33 s;
- 100 mile straightaway - 4 h 13 min 50 s.

These records were approved on 13 September 1940 and also carried Australian and WA records.

=== Australia and Western Australia (road) ===
- 25 miles straightaway - 58 min 15 s on 13 September 1940;
- 25 miles out and home - l h 9 min 29 s on 14 November 1940.
- 1 hour straightaway - 25.7 miles
- 2 hours straightaway - 49.8 miles
- 3 hours straightaway - 72.0 miles
- 4 hours straightaway - 95.1 miles on 28 September 1940.

=== Road distances (Western Australia) ===
- Northam to Perth (61.1 miles) - 2 h 52 min on 11 March 1938;
- Perth to Northam - 3 h 14 min on 11 September 1939
- York to Perth (60 miles) - 2 h 46 min 30 s on 24 October 1939
- Perth to York - 2 h 55 mln 45 s in August 1940;
- Bunbury to Perth (115.4 miles) - 5 h 38 min 35 s on 18 October 1940
- Perth to Bunbury - 5 h 25 min 45 s on 21 August 1940.

=== Unpaced on Collie track ===
- Five miles - 14 min 13 s
- 10 miles - 28 min 58 s
- 20 miles - 58 min 33 s
- 25 miles - 1 h 13 min 33 s
- One hour - 20 miles 1,291 yards on 23 August 1941

These figures carry Australian and WA records.

=== Roller records ===
- One hour - 34.3 miles;
- 25 miles - 34 min;
- 50 miles - 1 h 21 min.

These figures were made in Perth in 1941 and carry Australian and WA record titles
