= Goodland Township, Itasca County, Minnesota =

Goodland Township, Minnesota
- Township
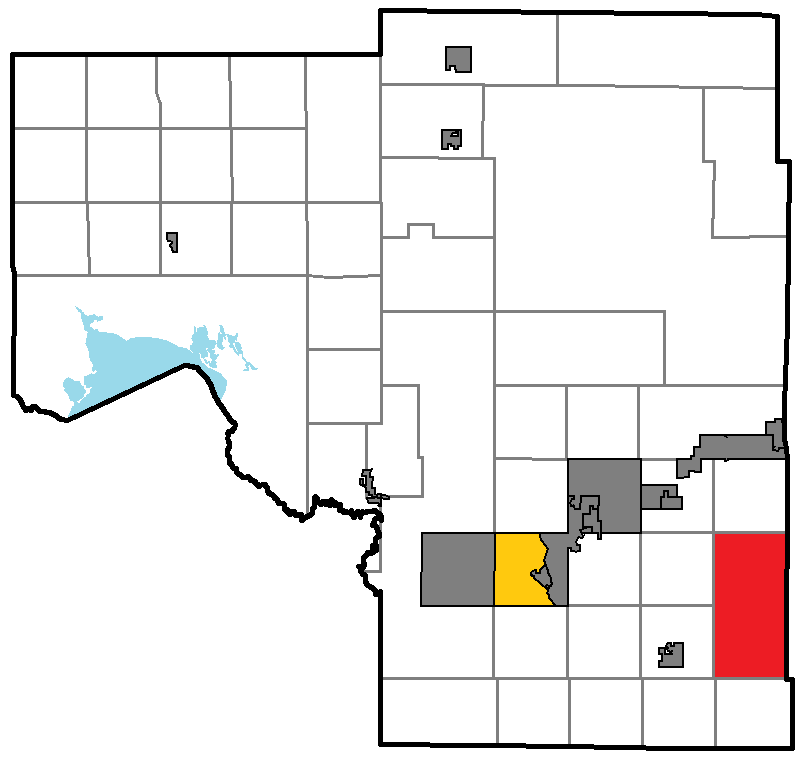
- Location of Goodland Township, within Itasca County, Minnesota
- Coordinates: 47°12′47″N 93°8′43″W
- Country: United States
- State: Minnesota
- County: Itasca

Area
  - Total: 72.3 sq mi (187.2 km^{2})
  - Land: 69.2 sq mi (179.1 km^{2})
  - Water: 3.1 sq mi (8.1 km^{2})
- Elevation: 1,414 ft (431 m)

Population (2020)
  - Total: 473
  - Density: 6.84/sq mi (2.64/km^{2})
- Time zone: UTC-6 (Central (CST))
  - Summer (DST): UTC-5 (CDT)
- ZIP code: 55742
- Area code: 218
- FIPS code: 27-24452
- GNIS feature ID: 0664293

Goodland Township is a township in Itasca County, Minnesota, United States. The population was 473 at the 2020 census. It contains the census-designated place of Goodland.

== Geography ==
According to the United States Census Bureau, the township has a total area of 72.3 square miles (187 km^{2}), of which 69.2 square miles (179 km^{2}) is land and 3.1 square miles (8.0 km^{2}), or 4.33%, is water.

== Demographics ==
As of the census of 2000, there were 496 people, 210 households, and 153 families living in the township. The population density was 7.2 inhabitants per square mile (2.8/km^{2}). There were 348 housing units at an average density of 5.0 per square mile (1.9/km^{2}). The racial makeup of the township was 97.18% White, 0.20% Native American, 0.20% Asian, 0.60% from other races, and 1.81% from two or more races. Hispanic or Latino of any race were 0.60% of the population.

There were 210 households, out of which 21.4% had children under the age of 18 living with them, 66.2% were married couples living together, 2.9% had a female householder with no husband present, and 26.7% were non-families. 24.3% of all households were made up of individuals, and 8.6% had someone living alone who was 65 years of age or older. The average household size was 2.36 and the average family size was 2.77.

In the township the population was spread out, with 18.5% under the age of 18, 7.7% from 18 to 24, 24.8% from 25 to 44, 33.7% from 45 to 64, and 15.3% who were 65 years of age or older. The median age was 45 years. For every 100 females, there were 118.5 males. For every 100 females age 18 and over, there were 117.2 males.

The median income for a household in the township was $39,375, and the median income for a family was $42,500. Males had a median income of $37,159 versus $21,250 for females. The per capita income for the township was $19,694. About 2.1% of families and 6.8% of the population were below the poverty line, including 6.5% of those under age 18 and 4.8% of those age 65 or over.
