= Pengilly, Minnesota =

Unincorporated community in Minnesota, United States

Pengilly
- Unincorporated community
- Location within Minnesota Location within the United States
- Coordinates: 47°19′58″N 93°11′50″W
- Country: United States
- State: Minnesota
- County: Itasca
- Elevation: 1,368 ft (417 m)

Population
  - Total: 270
- Time zone: UTC-6 (Central (CST))
  - Summer (DST): UTC-5 (CDT)
- ZIP code: 55775
- Area code: 218
- GNIS feature ID: 649259

Pengilly is an unincorporated community in eastern Itasca County, Minnesota, United States.

Located in the northern part of the state, the community lies in the Iron Range region at the northern end of Swan Lake. Pengilly is located between Grand Rapids and Hibbing at the junction of U.S. Highway 169 and Minnesota State Highway 65. The expressway section of U.S. 169 that travels between the cities of Virginia and Hibbing currently ends in the community of Pengilly.

== Geography ==
Pengilly is located along the boundary line between Greenway Township and Lone Pine Township.

The community is located along the northern end of Swan Lake.

Nearby places include Nashwauk, Keewatin, Calumet, Marble, and Goodland.

Pengilly is located 19 miles northeast of Grand Rapids. Pengilly is also located 15 miles west-southwest of Hibbing; and 18 miles north of Swan River.

== History ==
Pengilly gets its name from the community physician, John Pengilly.

From 1970 to 1989, the Youth Leadership Camp (YLC) for deaf high school students was held at Swan Lake Lodge in Pengilly.

Pengilly celebrated its centennial August 29–31, 2008.

== Notable people ==
- Norbert P. Arnold, Minnesota State Senator, businessman, and inventor, lived in Pengilly.
- Lois Hall, actress, grew up in Pengilly
- Mike Peluso, former NHL player
