= Costin Village, Minnesota =

Former Town in Minnesota, United States

Costin Village
- Former Town
- Location within Minnesota
- Coordinates: 47°31′57″N 92°37′25″W
- Country: United States
- State: Minnesota
- County: Saint Louis
- Time zone: UTC-6 (Central (CST))
  - Summer (DST): UTC-5 (CDT)
- Area code: 218
- GNIS feature ID: 661972

Costin Village is a former townsite at the location of what is now the city of Mountain Iron, Minnesota. Costin Village was founded by John Costin. Its population in the year 1907 was 1,000 people.
