= Silica, Minnesota =

Silica
- Unincorporated community
- Location within Minnesota Location within the United States
- Coordinates: 47°15′53″N 93°01′15″W
- Country: United States
- State: Minnesota
- County: Saint Louis
- Elevation: 1,335 ft (407 m)

Population
  - Total: 50
- Time zone: UTC-6 (Central (CST))
  - Summer (DST): UTC-5 (CDT)
- ZIP codes: 55746
- Area code: 218
- GNIS feature ID: 662447

Silica is an unincorporated community in Saint Louis County, Minnesota, United States.

The community is located immediately south of the city of Hibbing at the intersection of State Highway 73 (MN 73) and Saint Louis County Road 440 (Mattson Road). The West Swan River flows through the community.

The boundary line between Itasca and Saint Louis counties is nearby.
