= Warba, Minnesota =

City in Minnesota, United States

Warba
- City
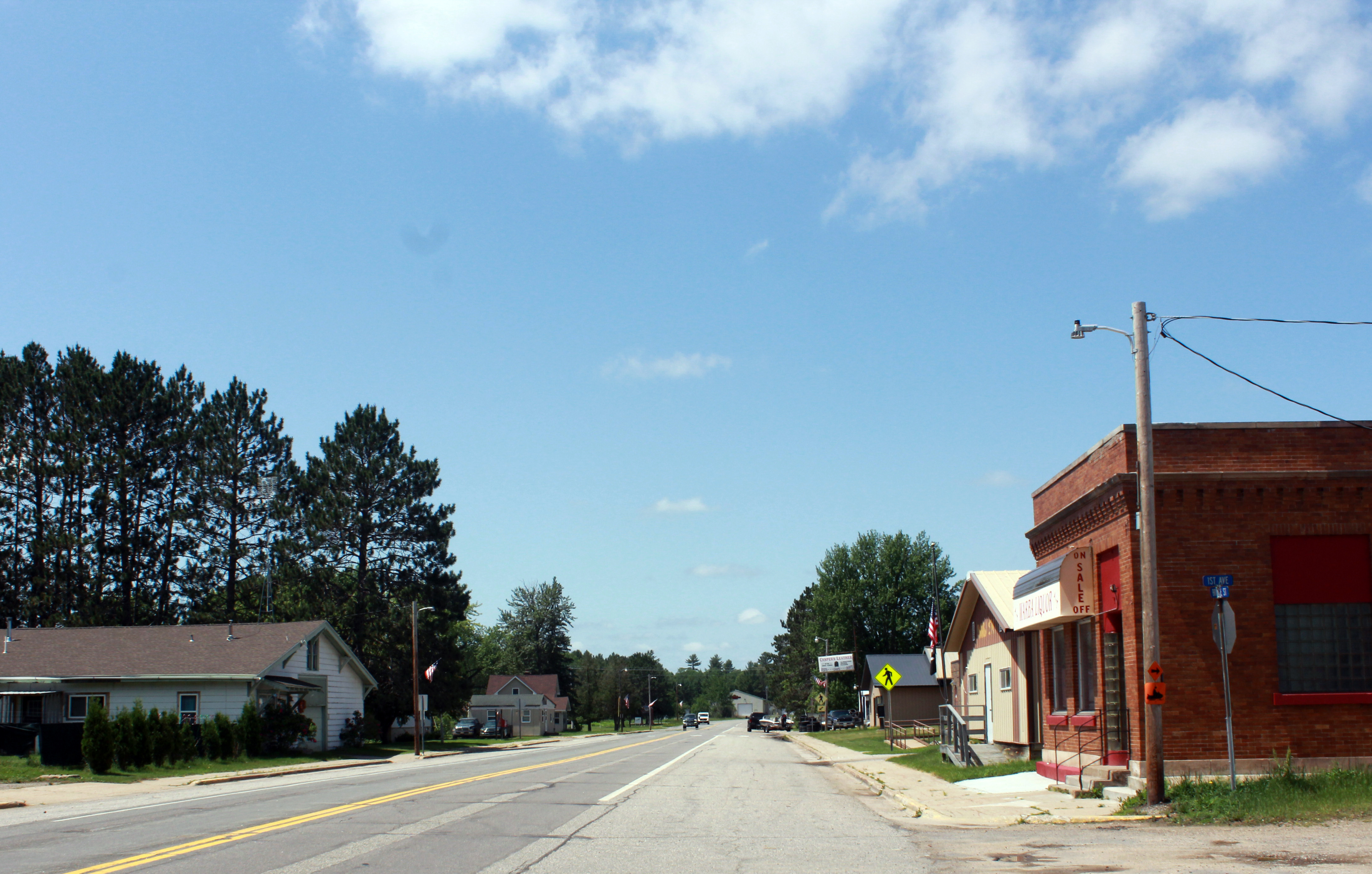
- Bridge Street

- Location of the city of Warba within Itasca County, Minnesota
- Coordinates: 47°7′50″N 93°16′8″W
- Country: United States
- State: Minnesota
- County: Itasca

Area
  - Total: 3.28 sq mi (8.49 km^{2})
  - Land: 3.22 sq mi (8.35 km^{2})
  - Water: 0.050 sq mi (0.13 km^{2})
- Elevation: 1,283 ft (391 m)

Population (2020)
  - Total: 168
  - Density: 52.1/sq mi (20.11/km^{2})
- Time zone: UTC-6 (Central (CST))
  - Summer (DST): UTC-5 (CDT)
- ZIP code: 55793
- Area code: 218
- FIPS code: 27-68080
- GNIS feature ID: 0658896

Warba is a city in Itasca County, Minnesota, United States. The population was 168 at the 2020 census.

U.S. Highway 2 serves as a main route in the community.

== History ==
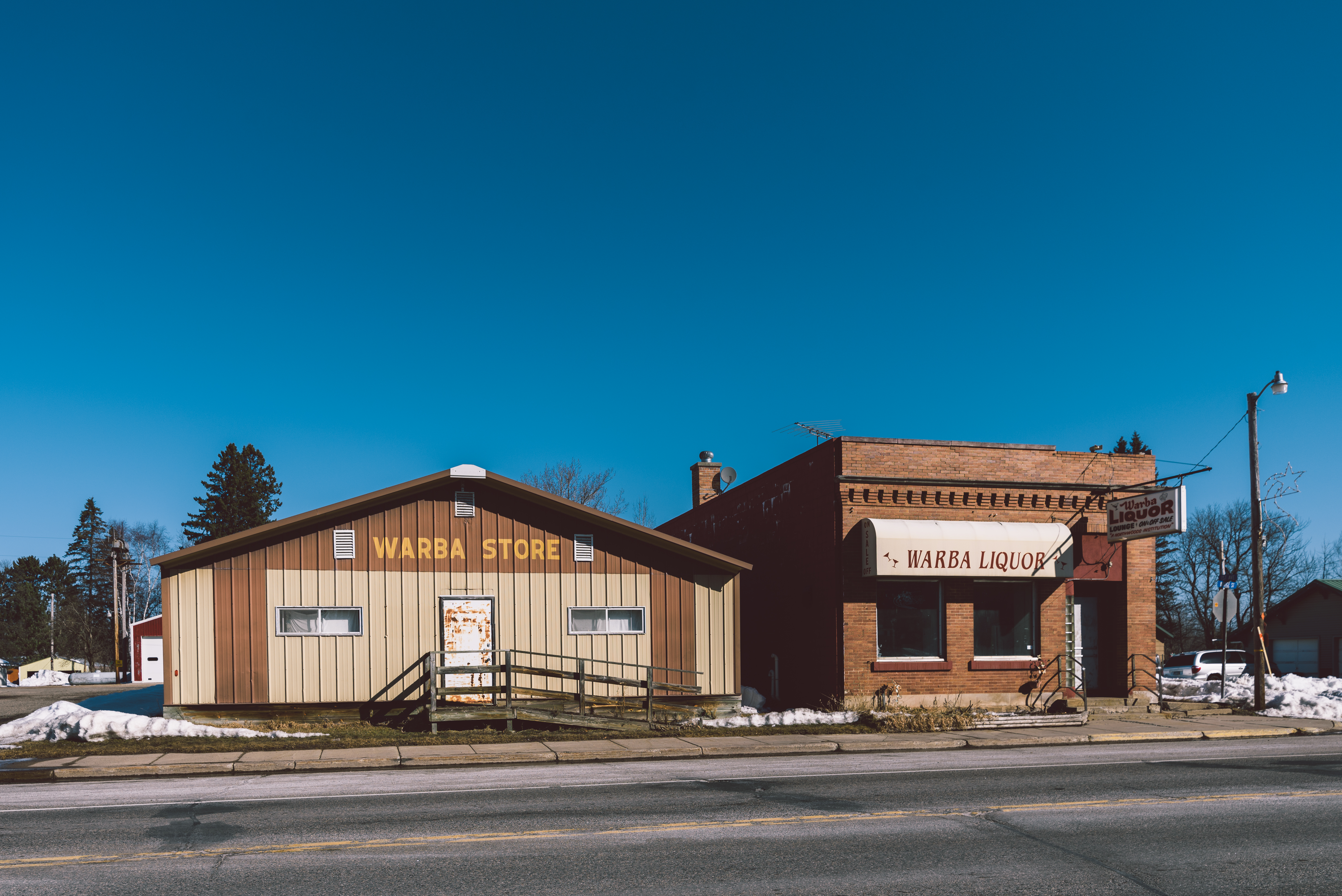
A store on U.S. Highway 2, Bridge Street, in Warba

A post office called Warba has been in operation since 1910. Warba is a name derived from the Ojibwe language meaning "soon".

== Geography ==
According to the United States Census Bureau, the city has a total area of 3.27 square miles (8.47 km^{2}), of which 3.21 square miles (8.31 km^{2}) is land and 0.06 square miles (0.16 km^{2}) is water.

Warba is along the Swan River. It is 14 miles east-southeast of Grand Rapids.

== Demographics ==
Historical population
Census	Pop.	Note	%±
1930	154		—
1940	124		−19.5%
1950	125		0.8%
1960	162		29.6%
1970	148		−8.6%
1980	150		1.4%
1990	137		−8.7%
2000	183		33.6%
2010	181		−1.1%
2020	168		−7.2%
U.S. Decennial Census

=== 2010 census ===
As of the census of 2010, there were 181 people, 77 households, and 47 families living in the city. The population density was 56.4 inhabitants per square mile (21.8/km^{2}). There were 90 housing units at an average density of 28.0 per square mile (10.8/km^{2}). The racial makeup of the city was 97.2% White and 2.8% Native American.

There were 77 households, of which 29.9% had children under the age of 18 living with them, 44.2% were married couples living together, 10.4% had a female householder with no husband present, 6.5% had a male householder with no wife present, and 39.0% were non-families. 31.2% of all households were made up of individuals, and 9.1% had someone living alone who was 65 years of age or older. The average household size was 2.35 and the average family size was 2.83.

The median age in the city was 37.8 years. 23.8% of residents were under the age of 18; 7.1% were between the ages of 18 and 24; 23.3% were from 25 to 44; 34.7% were from 45 to 64; and 11% were 65 years of age or older. The gender makeup of the city was 49.2% male and 50.8% female.

=== 2000 census ===
As of the census of 2000, there were 183 people, 79 households, and 57 families living in the city. The population density was 57.3 inhabitants per square mile (22.1/km^{2}). There were 86 housing units at an average density of 26.9 per square mile (10.4/km^{2}). The racial makeup of the city was 98.36% White, and 1.64% from two or more races. Hispanic or Latino of any race were 1.64% of the population.

There were 79 households, out of which 31.6% had children under the age of 18 living with them, 59.5% were married couples living together, 11.4% had a female householder with no husband present, and 26.6% were non-families. 22.8% of all households were made up of individuals, and 8.9% had someone living alone who was 65 years of age or older. The average household size was 2.32 and the average family size was 2.69.

In the city, the population was spread out, with 23.5% under the age of 18, 9.3% from 18 to 24, 31.7% from 25 to 44, 19.1% from 45 to 64, and 16.4% who were 65 years of age or older. The median age was 38 years. For every 100 females, there were 105.6 males. For every 100 females age 18 and over, there were 102.9 males.

The median income for a household in the city was $27,500, and the median income for a family was $31,250. Males had a median income of $21,429 versus $16,250 for females. The per capita income for the city was $11,772. About 14.3% of families and 19.6% of the population were below the poverty line, including 26.2% of those under the age of eighteen and none of those 65 or over.

== See also ==
- Northern Lights Community School

== Gallery ==
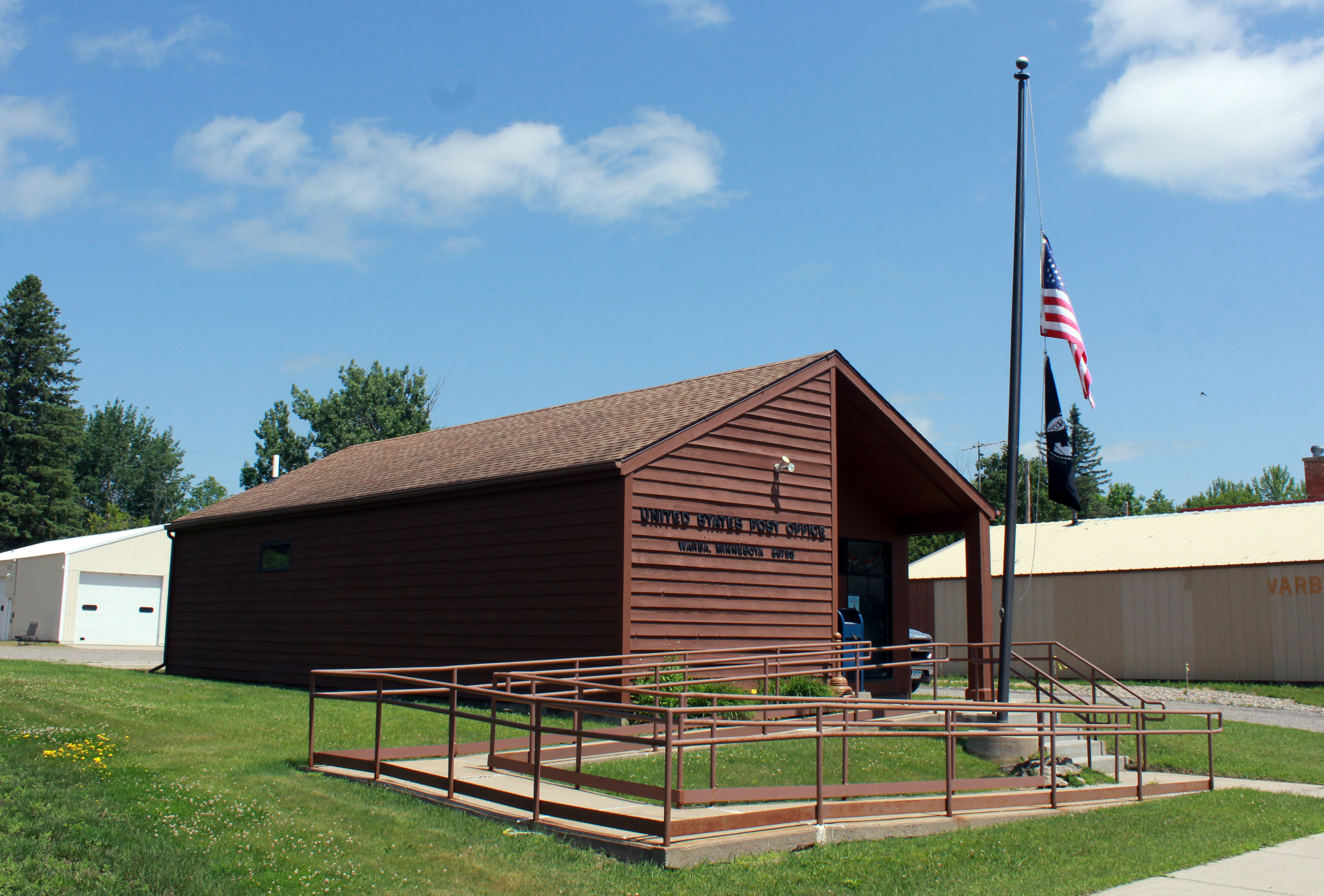
Post Office

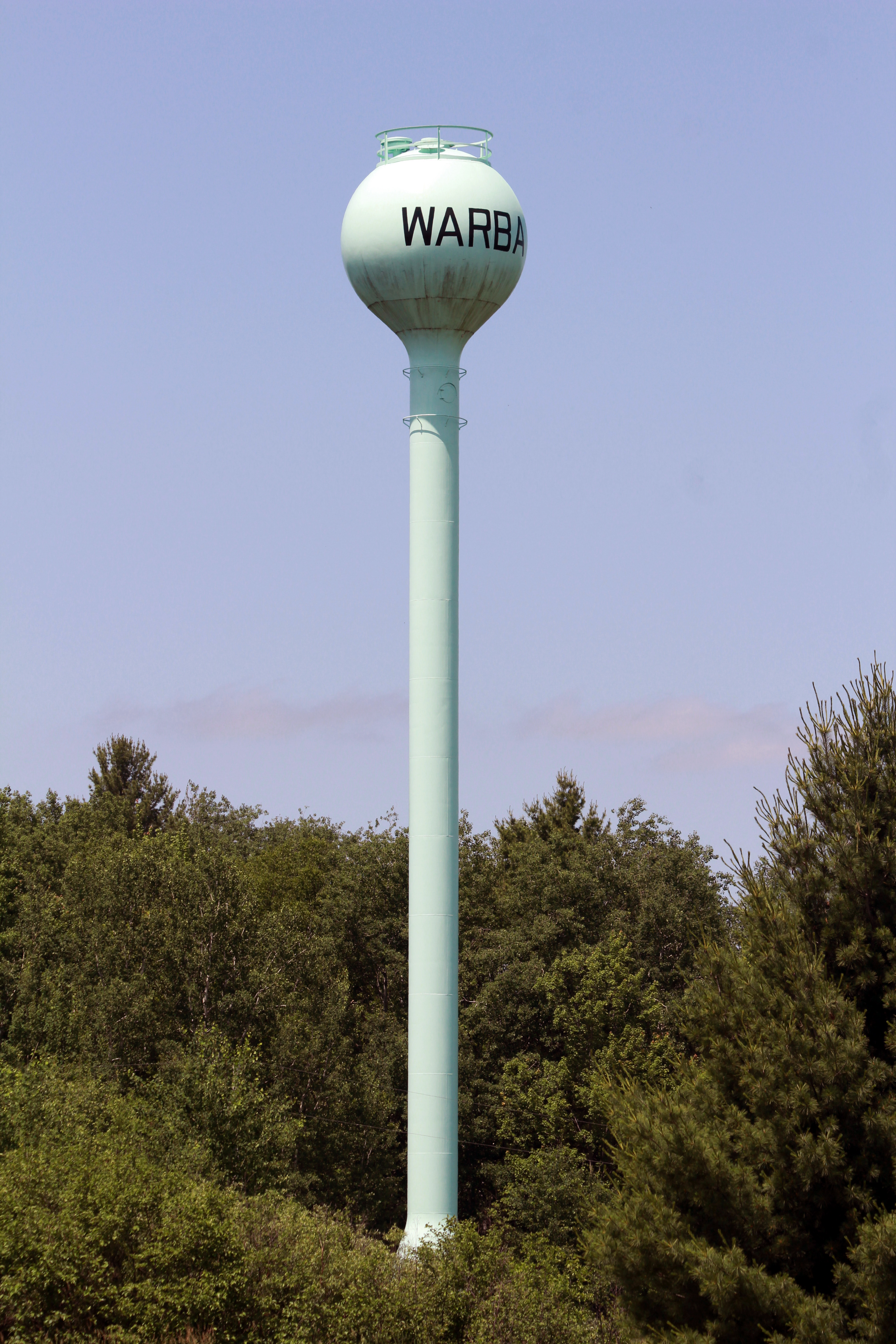
Water tower

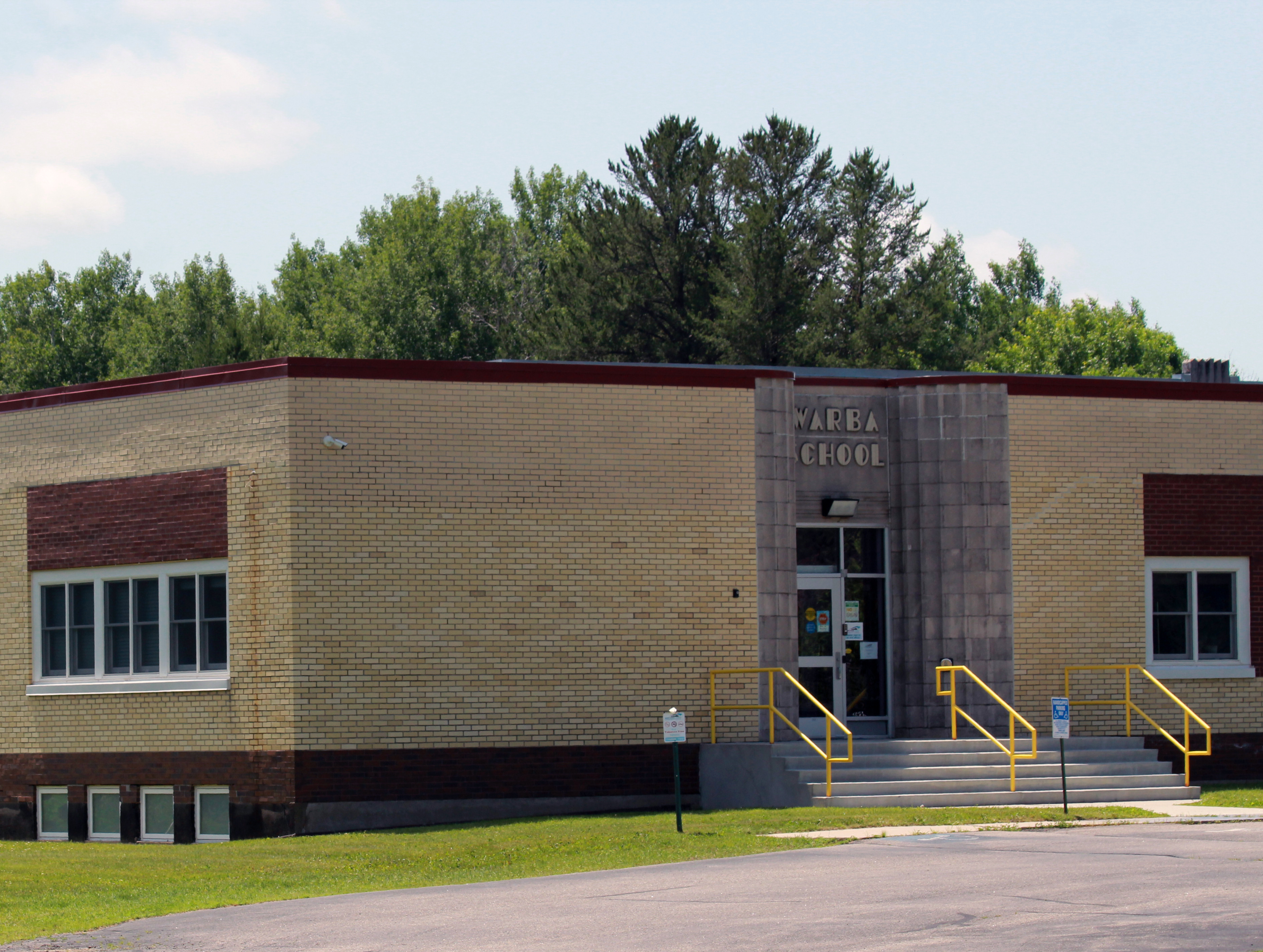
Warba School, now Northern Lights Community School
